= List of people with given name James =

This is a list of notable people named James.

== People ==
- James I (disambiguation)
- James II (disambiguation)
- James III (disambiguation)
- James IV (1473–1513), King of Scotland
- James IV of Majorca (c. 1336–1375), unsuccessful claimant of the thrones of the Kingdom of Majorca and the Principality of Achaea

=== A ===
- James Adams (disambiguation)
- James Adomian (born 1980), American stand-up comedian, actor, and impressionist
- James Akinjo (born 2000), American basketball player
- Jim Aldred (born 1963), Canadian ice hockey coach and player
- James Anderson (disambiguation)
- James Aneke, Nigerian politician
- James Arthur (disambiguation)
- James E. Avant (1963−2018), American jockey
- James Avery (disambiguation)

=== B ===
- James Baldwin, American writer and civil rights activist
- James F. Bandrowski, author and global keynote speaker
- James E. Banta, American health scientist
- James Murray Beck (1914–2011), Canadian historian
- James F. Blake (1912–2002), American bus driver
- James Blanco (born 1981), Filipino actor, model, singer, and songwriter
- James Bliska, American molecular biologist
- James Blunt (born 1974), English musician
- James Bockelman (born 1934), American politician from Florida
- James B. Bolger (1935–2025), 35th prime minister of New Zealand
- James Boness, American finance academic
- James Boyd (1920–2006), American racing driver
- James Dean Bradfield (born 1969), Welsh singer-songwriter, musician, and record producer
- James B. Brandt (1909–1983), American politician
- James R. Brashears (1858–1917), American lawyer, politician, state senator, and judge
- James D. Brenton, clinician scientist
- James Broach, American biochemist and molecular biologist
- James Brockermeyer (born 2002), American football player
- James L. Brooks (born 1940), American director, producer, and screenwriter
- James Blount (disambiguation)
- James Braithwaite (1838–1919), English obstetric physician
- James Brown (disambiguation)
- James Buchanan (disambiguation)
- James Butler, 1st Duke of Ormond (1610–1688), Anglo-Irish viceroy
- James Butler, 2nd Earl of Ormond (1331–1382), Irish peer and Lord Justice of Ireland
- James Butler, 3rd Earl of Ormond (1359–1405), Noble in the Peerage of Ireland
- James Butler, 4th Earl of Ormond (1393–1452), Irish earl
- James Butler, 5th Earl of Ormond (1420–1461), Anglo-Irish nobleman
- James Butler, 9th Earl of Ormond (1496–1546), Irish nobleman (died 1546)
- James Butler, 1st Marquess of Ormonde (1777–1838), Irish politician
- James Butler, 2nd Duke of Ormonde (1665–1745), Irish statesman and army officer
- James Byrd Jr. (1949–1998), American murder victim

=== C ===
- James Caan (disambiguation)
- James M. Cain, American crime fiction writer
- James Cameron (disambiguation)
- James Carter (1924–2024), 39th U.S. President
- James Carrey (born 1962), Canadian-American actor and comedian
- James Chadwick (1891–1974), English physicist
- James Cheverud, American biologist
- James Coburn (disambiguation)
- James Connolly (disambiguation)
- James Connor (disambiguation)
- James Cook (disambiguation)
- James Fenimore Cooper, American novelist
- James Corden (born 1978), English actor, comedian, singer, writer, producer, and former television host
- James Craggs the Younger (1686–1721), English Whig politician
- James Craik (disambiguation)
- James T. Crossland (1829–1863), Confederate lieutenant colonel in the Civil War

=== D ===
- James Davant (1915–2009), chief executive of Paine Webber
- James Dean (disambiguation)
- James Derriman (1922–2007), British writer
- James Dobson (1936–2025), American evangelical Christian psychologist
- James Donaldson (born 1998), American Youtuber, also known as MrBeast
- James Dorsa, composer and harpsichordist
- James W. Douglass, American author, activist, Christian theologian, and investigative journalist
- James Duncan (disambiguation)

=== E ===
- James Elliott (disambiguation), including people named James Elliot
- James Ellroy, American crime fiction writer and essayist
- James S. Ettema, American academic

=== F ===
- James Fanstone (1890–1987), British Christian medical missionary
- James Files, American murderer
- James Flawn (1837–1917), English restaurateur and tent revivalist
- James Franco (born 1978), American actor and filmmaker
- James Freeman (disambiguation)

=== G ===
- James Gandolfini (1961–2013), American actor
- James Garfield (disambiguation)
- James H. Geer, American psychologist
- James Gillespie (disambiguation)
- James Glerum (died 2020), Central Intelligence Agency Paramilitary Case Officer
- James Graham (disambiguation)
- James Grant (disambiguation)
- James Grazioplene (born 1949), former United States Army major general and convicted sex offender
- James Green (disambiguation)
- James Gunn (disambiguation)
- James Griswold (1828–1892), American politician, member of the Connecticut General Assembly

=== H ===
- James Haffey (1857–1910), American politician
- James M. Halsey (1825–1899), American farmer, merchant, and politician
- James Hanning, English footballer
- James Harden, American basketball player
- James Morgan Hart (1839–1916), American academic, philologist, and translator
- James Heath (disambiguation)
- James Hemsley (born 1941), British digital heritage consultant
- James Hetfield (born 1963), American singer
- James William Hindle, British singer-songwriter
- James Holshouser (1934–2013), American lawyer and politician, 68th governor of North Carolina
- James Holstein, American sociologist
- James Holzhauer (born 1984), American game show contestant and professional sports gambler
- James Honeyben, English rugby union coach and former professional rugby player
- James Honeycutt (born 1958), American academic
- James Horner (1953–2015), American film composer and conductor
- James P. Hosty, FBI agent who investigated Lee Harvey Oswald
- James Howard (disambiguation)
- James Hoyle (born 1985), England rugby union player
- James H. Hurley, American university professor

=== I ===
- James Ibori (born 1959), Nigerian politician
- James Ida (born 1940), American mobster
- James Wani Igga (born 1949), South Sudanese politician
- James Monroe Iglehart (born 1974), American actor and singer
- James T. Igoe (1883–1971), American politician
- James Iha (born 1968), American rock musician
- James Ihedigbo (born 1983), American football player
- James Ijames (born 1980), American playwright
- James Lorimer Ilsley (1894–1967), Canadian politician
- James H. Imlay (1764–1823), American politician
- James Ince (born 1970), American NASCAR crew chief
- James Ingram (1952–2019), American singer, songwriter, and record producer
- James Ingram (academic) (1774–1850), English academic
- James Dickson Innes (1887–1914), British painter
- James Rose Innes (1855–1942), South African Chief Justice from 1914 to 1927
- James C. Inzer (1887–1967), American politician and lawyer
- James Iredell Jr. (1788–1853), American politician
- James Iredell (1751–1799), US Supreme Court justice from 1790 to 1799
- James Irvin (politician) (1800–1862), American politician
- James Irvin (fighter) (born 1978), American mixed martial arts fighter
- James Irvine (chemist) (1877–1952), British organic chemist
- James Irvine (Pennsylvania politician) (1735–1819), American politician
- James K. Irving (1928–2024), Canadian businessman
- James Irwin (1930–1991), American astronaut and lunar explorer
- James Isaac (1960–2012), American film director
- James Isaminger (1880–1946), American sportswriter
- James Isbister (1833–1915), Canadian politician
- James Ivory (mathematician) (1765–1842), Scottish mathematician
- James Ivory (born 1928), American film director and screenwriter

=== J ===
- James Johnson (born 1972), American politician, Speaker of the United States House of Representatives
- James Jordan (disambiguation)
- James Joyce, Irish novelist, poet and literary critic

=== K ===
- James Kellett (born 1998), British racing driver
- James Kirkaldy (1885–1911), British footballer
- James Kluegel (born 1947), American sociologist
- James Kutsch, American computer scientist
- James Kynvyn, English craftsman

=== L ===
- James Lankford (born 1968), American politician, U.S. senator from Oklahoma
- James W. Le Duc, American virologist and epidemiologist
- James Lewis (disambiguation)
- James Lichtenstein (born 1994), American high diver
- James Lockhart (disambiguation)
- James Lontayao, American actor, comedian and former VJ of MyxTV
- James Lowther, 1st Viscount Ullswater (1855–1949), British politician
- James H. Lubowitz (born 1962), American orthopedic surgeon
- James Luckcock (1761–1835), English jeweller
- James Lutgen, American murderer

=== M ===
- James Mackay, 1st Earl of Inchcape (1852–1932), British businessman and colonial administrator
- James Madison (disambiguation)
- James Mandler (1922–2007), American basketball player
- James M. Mannas (born 1941), African-American film director and cinematographer
- James Marriott (disambiguation)
- James Martin (disambiguation)
- James May (born 1963), British television presenter
- James McAvoy (born 1979), Scottish actor
- James McCartney (born 1942) English musician, songwriter, and former member of bands The Beatles and Wings
- James MacCash (1834–1922), founder of the Order of Scottish Clans
- James McEvoy (disambiguation)
- James Miller (disambiguation)
- James D. Mockler (1939–2014), American politician
- James Monroe (disambiguation)
- James Monteith (1831–1890), American author
- James Marsden (born 1973), American actor and singer
- James Mosley (1935–2025), British librarian and book historian
- James Mueller (disambiguation)

=== N ===
- James Neff, American journalist and writer
- James Nevels, American business executive and entrepreneur
- James P. M. Ntozi, Ugandan academic
- James Nuckolls (1938–1987), American lighting designer, author, and educator

=== O ===
- James O'Barr (born 1960), American graphic and comics artist
- James O'Brien (died 1771), Irish nobleman and politician
- James O'Brien (broadcaster) (born 1972), British journalist
- James O'Brien (hurler) (born 1983), Irish hurler
- James O'Brien (New Zealand politician) (1874–1947), New Zealand politician
- James H. O'Brien (1860–1924), American politician
- James Joseph O'Brien (1930–2007), British clergyman and auxiliary bishop
- James M. O'Brien (1890–1958), American politician
- James O'Connor (footballer, born 1979), Irish footballer
- James O'Connor (footballer, born 1984), English footballer
- James O'Connor (Louisiana politician) (1870–1941), American politician
- James O'Connor (bishop) (1823–1890), Irish-born American Catholic prelate
- James O'Connor (Cork politician) (born 1997), Irish politician
- James O'Connor (Irish judge) (1872–1931), Irish solicitor, barrister and judge
- James O'Connor (rugby union) (born 1990), Australia international rugby union player
- James F. O'Connor (1878–1945), American politician
- James L. O'Connor (1859–1931), American politician
- James O'Donnell (organist) (born 1961), British organist
- James O'Donnell (politician) (1840–1915), American politician
- James P. O'Donnell (1917–1990), American author and journalist
- James O'Donoghue (born 1990), Kerry Gaelic footballer
- James A. O'Gorman (1860–1943), American politician
- James Myles O'Gorman (1804–1874), Irish-born prelate of the Catholic Church in the U.S.
- James M. E. O'Grady (1863–1928), American politician
- James G. O'Hara (1925–1989), American politician
- James O'Keefe (born 1984), American political activist
- James O'Keeffe (died 1986), Irish politician
- James O'Kelly (1735–1826), American Methodist
- James A. O'Leary (1889–1944), American politician
- James O'Loghlin (politician) (1852–1925), Australian politician
- James O'Meara (1919–1974), British flying ace
- James O'Neill (actor, born 1847) (1847–1920), American actor
- James O'Neill (baseball), American baseball player
- James P. O'Neill (born 1958), American police officer
- James O'Reilly (bishop) (1855–1934), Irish-born prelate
- James O'Reilly (judge) (born 1955), Canadian judge
- James Edwin O'Reilly (1833–1907), Canadian mayor of Hamilton
- James O'Shaughnessy (American football) (born 1992), American football player
- James O'Shaughnessy, Baron O'Shaughnessy (born 1976), British politician
- James L. Oakes (1924–2007), American judge
- James Oberg (born 1944), Space flight expert
- James Peter Obeyesekere III (1915–2007), Sri Lankan politician and aviator
- James Obiorah (born 1978), Nigerian footballer
- James Obst (born 1990), Australian poker player
- James Oddo (born 1966), Republican politician from Staten Island
- James R. Oestreich (born 1943), American music critic
- James Ogden (1868–1932), Australian politician
- James Douglas Ogilby (1853–1925), Australian ichthyologist and herpetologist
- James Ogilvy (born 1964), British landscape designer and publisher
- James Oglethorpe (1696–1785), British army officer, politician and colonial administrator
- James Ohrenschall (born 1972), American politician
- James Olayinka (born 2000), English footballer
- James Oldshue (1925–2007), chemical engineer
- James Olson (actor) (1930–2022), American actor
- James S. Olson (born 1946), American historian and author
- James Oram (born 1993), New Zealand bicycle racer
- James Orange (1942–2008), American pastor and activist
- James Orbinski (born 1960), Canadian physician, humanitarian activist, author and leading scholar in global health
- James Orengo (born 1951), Kenyan lawyer and human rights activist
- James Bradley Orman (1849–1919), American politician
- James Lawrence Orr (1822–1873), American politician
- James R. Osgood (1836–1892), American publisher
- James Otis Jr. (1725–1783), American lawyer and activist
- James Otis (mayor) (1826–1875), 15th Mayor of San Francisco from 1873 to 1875
- James C. Otis (1912–1993), American judge
- James Otto (born 1973), American country music artist
- James Outman (born 1997), American baseball player
- James A. Owen (born 1969), American novelist
- James Owens (American football, born 1955) (born 1955), American football player and hurdler
- James B. Owens (1920–2009), American engineer and company executive
- James W. Owens (congressman) (1837–1900), American politician

=== P ===
- James Parker (disambiguation)
- James E. Paschall (1923–2024), United States Air Force major general
- James Pendleton (disambiguation)
- James Pernotto (born 1950), American contemporary artist
- James Petras (1937–2026), American sociologist and political writer
- James Plummer (disambiguation)
- James Polk (disambiguation)
- James Powell (disambiguation)
- James T. Prokopanko, former president and chief executive officer of The Mosaic Company
- James Purdy (1914–2009), American writer, poet and playwright
- James H. Purkins (1814–?), American politician

=== Q ===
- James Edward Quigley (1854–1915), Canadian-born American Catholic prelate
- James M. Quigley (1918–2011), American politician
- James Quin (1693–1766), 18th-century Anglo-Irish actor
- James Quinn (athlete) (1906–2004), American sprinter
- James Quinn (bishop) (1819–1881), Irish-Australian prelate of the Catholic Church
- James H. Quinn (1857–1930), American judge
- James L. Quinn (politician) (1875–1960), American politician

=== R ===
- James Ransone (1979–2025), American actor
- James Earl Ray, American assassin of Martin Luther King Jr.
- James Reid (disambiguation)
- James Riady (born 1957), Indonesian businessman
- James Ricardo, American film director, producer, and screenwriter
- James Rodríguez (disambiguation)
- Jimmy Rolder (born 2004), American football player
- James Roosevelt I (1828–1900), American businessman
- James Rosette (1938–2019), American boxer
- James Rymer (1750–1829), Scottish naval surgeon and medical writer

=== S ===
- James Saito, Japanese-American actor
- James Sallis (1944–2026), American writer
- James Salter (1925–2015), American writer
- James Stanley Scott (1889–1975), Canadian general
- James Shortle, American economist
- James Simpson (disambiguation)
- James Smith (disambiguation)
- James Sodetz, American biologist
- James Sorrie (1885–1955), Scottish first-class cricketer
- James Specht, American agronomist
- James Spotila, American biologist
- James Staiano, executive chef of the Madison Room and Bar at the New York Palace Hotel
- James Stanford, American contemporary artist
- James Stone (disambiguation)
- James "The Rev" Sullivan (1981–2009), American drummer

=== T ===
- James Tague (1936–2014), a notable witness to the assassination of US President John F. Kennedy
- James Talarico (born 1989), American politician
- James Taylor (disambiguation)
- James Teng (born 1998), Filipino actor
- James Tepper, American neuroscientist
- James G. Thimmes (1896–1955), American labor unionist
- James P. Trevelyan (born 1948), Australian engineer and researcher
- James Troupe (1909–1994), American politician
- James Trousdale (1736–1818), captain in the American Revolution
- James Tuttiett (born 1963), British businessman

=== U ===
- John James Akpan Udo-Edehe (born 1960), Nigerian politician
- James Blood Ulmer (1940–2026), American jazz and blues guitarist and singer
- James Unaipon (c. 1835–1907), Australian indigenous preacher
- James Boyle Uniacke (1799–1858), Canadian politician
- James Urban (born 1973), American football player and coach
- James Urbaniak (born 1963), American actor
- James II of Urgell (1388–1433), Count of Urgell
- James Ussher (1581–1656), 17th-century Anglican Archbishop of Armagh
- James B. Utt (1899–1970), American politician

=== V ===
- James Van Der Beek (1977–2026), American actor

=== W ===
- James Wannerton, English IT professional, artist, and writer
- James Warnock (engineer), American electrical engineer
- James Warnock (murderer) (born 1959), British murderer
- Jimmy Warnock (1912–1987), Northern Ireland boxer
- James Watson (1928–2025), American molecular biologist, geneticist, and zoologist
- James Leonard Waldrop (1955–1986), American actor and model
- James Watt (disambiguation)
- James Wharton, Baron Wharton of Yarm (born 1984), British politician
- James Wharton (author) (born 1987), author and LGBT activist
- James Wharton (boxer) (1813–1856), English boxer
- James Wharton (cricketer) (born 2001), English cricketer
- James Wharton (racing driver), Australian racing driver
- James Edward Wharton (1894–1944), United States Army officer
- J. Ernest Wharton (1899–1990), U.S. Representative from New York
- James White (disambiguation)
- James Whitfield (disambiguation)
- James H. Wolff (1847–1913) American lawyer, war veteran, and civil rights activist

=== Y ===
- James Yap (disambiguation)
- James Yates (minister) (1789–1871), English unitarian minister
- James J. Yeager (1908–1971), American football player and coach
- James Yems (1812–1868), New Zealand politician and auctioneer
- James Lucas Yeo (1782–1818), Royal Navy officer
- James Yorke (bishop) (1730–1808), British bishop
- James Yorkston (born 1971), Scottish folk musician
- James Yoshimura (born 1941), American writer and producer
- James Young (chemist) (1811–1883), Scottish chemist
- James Young (American musician) (born 1949), American musician
- James Young (director) (1872–1948), American film director
- James Young (basketball) (born 1995), American basketball player
- James Henry Young (1834–1908), Australian politician
- James R. Young (Pennsylvania politician) (1847–1924), American politician
- James Whitney Young (born 1941), American astronomer
- James Younghusband (born 1986), Filipino footballer
- James Yurichuk (born 1986), Canadian football player

=== Z ===
- James Zachery (1958–1994), American football player
- James Zagel (1941–2023), American judge
- James E. Van Zandt (1898–1986), American politician
- James R. Zazzali (born 1937), American judge
- James David Zellerbach (1892–1963), American diplomat
- James X. Zhan, British United Nations official and economist
- James D. Zirin (born 1940), New York lawyer, author
- James Zogby (born 1945), Founder of the Arab American Institute
- James Zwerg (born 1939), American civil rights activist

== Fictional characters ==
- James the Red Engine from The Railway Series/Thomas & Friends
- James Bond, from a series of films of the same name
- James Buchanan "Bucky" Barnes, from Marvel Comics
- James Diamond, one of the main members of Big Time Rush
- James Garrett, in season 4 of Zoey 101
- Commissioner James "Jim" Gordon, DC Comics and frequent ally of Batman
- James Hook, the captain from the Peter Pan franchise
- James Howlett (aka Logan), better known as Wolverine from Marvel Comics
- James Jones a character from Fireman Sam
- James T. Kirk, starship commander in the Star Trek television and motion picture franchise
- James MacDonald, a character in the animated series Arthur
- James "Jimmy" McGill, a character from Breaking Bad and protagonist in Better Call Saul
- Professor James Moriarty, antagonist of Sherlock Holmes
- James "Jimmy" McNulty, a character from The Wire
- James Issac ''Jimmy'' Neutron, title character of the Jimmy Neutron franchise
- James Possible, father of the title character in Kim Possible
- James Potter, father of Harry Potter in the series of the same name
- James Stinson, a recurring character in the American sitcom How I Met Your Mother
- James P. Sullivan, known as "Sulley", co-protagonist of the Pixar animated franchise Monsters, Inc.
- James Sunderland, the main character of the video game Silent Hill 2
- James Henry Trotter, main titular protagonist of James and the Giant Peach
- James Wilson, a character and M.D in the medical drama House

== See also ==
- Admiral James (disambiguation)
- General James (disambiguation)
- Judge James (disambiguation)
- Justice James (disambiguation)
- Senator James (disambiguation)
