= Lutgen =

Lutgen or Lütgen is a Low German, Danish, Wallonian and Luxembourgish surname. It is derived from a diminutive of a Germanic personal name formed either with the first element liut "people" or hlod/hlut "famous" (e. g. Ludger, Ludolf, Ludwig, Luitpold, Luther) and may refer to:

- Benoît Lutgen (born 1970), Belgian politician
- James Lutgen, American convicted of manslaughter
- Guy Lutgen (1936–2020), Belgian politician
- Balthazar Lütgen, a composer
