= Davant =

Davant is a surname. Notable people with the surname include:

- James Davant (1915–2009), American businessman
- Sophie Davant (born 1963), French journalist, television presenter and comedian
