= James H. Geer =

American psychologist

James H. Geer is an American psychologist. His area of research is sexuality.

== Career ==
Geer has researched sexuality for over 30 years. He explores the psychophysiology of sexual arousal and cognitive variables in sexuality. He worked on the faculty at University at Buffalo, University of Pennsylvania, and Stony Brook University. He retired from his position at Louisiana State University and moved to the Lancaster area to work as a visiting scholar at Franklin & Marshall College.

== Selected works ==
=== Books ===
- O'Donohue, William; Geer, James H. (2013). The Sexual Abuse of Children: Volume I: Theory and Research. Hoboken: Taylor and Francis. ISBN 9781317785033. OCLC 869092469.
- Geer, James H.; O'Donohue, William (2014). Theories of Human Sexuality. Springer Publishing. ISBN 9781475702019.
