= James E. Avant =

American jockey

James Eugene Avant (December 7, 1963, in LaGrange, Georgia – October 30, 2018) was an American jockey in Thoroughbred horse racing. Riding almost exclusively in Louisiana, during his career he has won more than 2,500 races. At Evangeline Downs, he shares the record with Curt Bourque of having ridden six winners on a single racecard, in 1988 & 1995.

James Avant has been the leading rider five times at Evangeline Downs and holds the record for most riding titles at Delta Downs with seven.
