= James T. Crossland =

James T. Crossland III (1829–1863) was a lieutenant colonel in the Confederate Army of Tennessee, serving under the commands of Major General Lafayette McLaws and Major General Walthall. He was killed during Braxton Bragg's defense of Lookout Mountain during the Chattanooga campaign. Crossland, who was Bragg's cousin, reportedly called the defense a "selfish and overconfident move by a General who cared little for the welfare of the men under his command."

== Early life and education ==
Crossland was born in 1829 in Kentucky to James T. Crossland Jr. and Mary Davis Crossland. His father was a lawyer in Louisville and was the brother of Margaret Crossland Bragg, the mother of Major General Braxton Bragg. In 1835, his family moved to Warrenton, North Carolina in order to be closer to their family. He attended Warrenton Male Academy where he excelled in English and was an excellent writer. He was later accepted to Yale University and began studying literature in 1847. After two years at Yale, Crossland accepted an appointment to the Virginia Military Institute in Lexington, Virginia. He was later commissioned as a second lieutenant in the 5th U.S. Artillery in 1851.

== Civil War ==
In 1860, Crossland was serving as a first lieutenant in the Virginia militia. At the outbreak of the Civil War, Crossland resigned his commission and was promoted to the rank of captain in the Army of Northern Virginia under the command of Major General Lafayette McLaws. Captain Crossland served as a company commander in the 10th Georgia Infantry Regiment. At the Battle of Fredericksburg, he successfully led his company in the defense of Marye's Heights. Due to his gallantry while defending Marye's Heights, Crossland was promoted to major.

=== Gettysburg ===
Major Crossland led his company at the Battles of Wheatfield and Peach Orchard during the Gettysburg campaign. His company suffered tremendous losses during its failed attempt to dislodge the Union position at Cemetery Ridge. He was promoted to Lieutenant Colonel and was transferred to the 24th Mississippi. He served as the executive officer of the 24th Mississippi under the command of Colonel William F. Dowd, which was a part of Major General Walthall's Brigade. This was the first time during the war that Crossland was placed under the command of his cousin, Braxton Bragg.

=== Battle of Chattanooga and death ===
During the Battle of Chattanooga, General Bragg ordered Walthall's Brigade, which included the 24th Mississippi to the Bench of Lookout Mountain. The 24th Mississippi was placed in the center with 27th and the 29th Mississippi to the left and right flank respectively. The generals under Bragg's command felt that the defensive position on the bench of Lookout Mountain was a poorly chosen area to mount an effective defense due to the multiple directions from which an enemy could attack. As the battle commenced, General Hooker's Union army outmaneuvered the Confederate lines. Crossland was shot and killed by a Union sharpshooter while attempting to rally his troops.

== Legacy ==
There are very few remaining memoirs or writings from Crossland. After his death, his writings were transferred to the Bragg estate where they were never seen again. The only history of Crossland's exploits are reports and memoirs from Confederate Generals on his performance and a letter from General Bragg that mentions his cousin. It is thought that Crossland was critical of his cousin, General Braxton Bragg, and wrote about his misgivings within his lost memoirs. Some historians believe that Bragg himself destroyed Crossland's memoir in order to protect the General's legacy.
