= Ludger (name) =

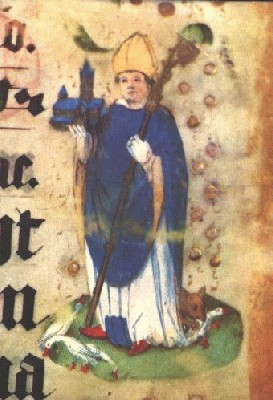
- Saint Liudger
- Pronunciation: German: [lʊdɡər]
- Gender: Male
- Name day: 26 March

Origin
- Origin: Germanic
- Region of origin: Utrecht

Other names
- Related names: Ludgeri, Ludgerus, Lutz, Liudger, Luidger, Luitger, Lüder, Lüer, Lüers, Lüür, Lui

Ludger is a masculine given name. Notable persons with the name include:

- Saint Ludger, bishop of Münster
- Liudger of Utrecht, bishop of Utrecht
- Ludger Alscher (1916–1985), German archaeologist
- Ludger Beerbaum (born 1963), German equestrian
- Ludger Desmarais, Canadian professional ice hockey player
- Ludger Dionne (1888–1962), Canadian businessman and politician
- Ludger Duvernay (1799–1852), Canadian publisher
- Ludger Fischer (born 1957), German historian
- Ludger Gerdes (1954–2008), German artist
- Ludger Kühnhardt (born 1958), German political scientist
- Ludger Lemieux (1872–1953), Canadian architect
- Ludger Lohmann (born 1954), German organist
- Ludger Mees (born 1957), German historian
- Ludger Pistor (born 1959), German actor
- Ludger Rémy (1949–2017), German harpsichordist, conductor and musicologist
- Ludger Stühlmeyer (born 1961), German cantor, composer, and musicologist
- Ludger Sylbaris (1870s–1929), Martiniquais circus artist

== Characters ==
- Ludger Will Kresnik, the main protagonist in the video game Tales of Xillia 2
- Ludger, a reaper in the manga Black Butler by Yana Toboso
