= William O'Donohue =

American psychologist (born 1957)

William T. "Bill" O'Donohue (born August 18, 1957) is an American psychologist who focuses on human sexuality, especially child sexual abuse. In 2009 O'Donohue was appointed as advisor to the DSM-V Work Group on Sexual and Gender Identity Disorders of the American Psychiatric Association.

== Life and career ==
O'Donohue earned a bachelor's degree in psychology at University of Illinois Urbana-Champaign. He went on to study clinical psychology at SUNY at Stony Brook earning a master's degree in 1982 and a Ph.D. in 1986. He then earned a master's degree in philosophy in 1988 from Indiana University Bloomington.

He was an assistant professor of psychology at the University of Maine from 1987 to 1991. In Harrington v. Almy the United States Court of Appeals for the First Circuit found that a penile plethysmograph test ordered to be administered by O'Donohue as a precondition of employment was a violation of a Maine police officer's rights under the Fourteenth Amendment to the United States Constitution. In 1996, he was appointed Director of Sexual Assault Prevention and Counseling Services at University of Nevada, Reno. O'Donohue founded CareIntegra with colleagues in 1999 and is its CEO.

O'Donohue has been critical of the use of forensic evaluations administered to litigants in child custody disputes. He told the New York Times, "Psychologists don't have the knowledge to do what they attempt to do when they do custody evaluations," adding that custody decisions are more about competing values than scientific findings when determining a child's best interest.

== Selected publications ==
=== Books ===
- Geer JH, O'Donohue WT (eds.) (1987). Theories of human sexuality. Plenum Press, ISBN 978-0-306-42459-5
- O'Donohue WT, Geer JH (eds.) (1992). The sexual abuse of children: Volume 1: Theory and research. Routledge, ISBN 978-0-8058-0340-2
- O'Donohue WT, Geer JH (eds.) (1992). The sexual abuse of children: Volume 2: Clinical Issues. Lawrence Erlbaum, ISBN 978-0-8058-0955-8
- O'Donohue WT, Geer JH (eds.) (1993). Handbook of sexual dysfunctions: assessment and treatment. Allyn & Bacon, ISBN 978-0-205-14787-8
- O'Donohue WT, Krasner L (eds.) (1994). Handbook of psychological skills training. Allyn & Bacon, ISBN 978-0-205-15261-2
- O'Donohue WT, Krasner L (eds.) (1995). Theories in behavior therapy. American Psychological Association Books. ISBN 978-1-55798-265-0
- O'Donohue WT, Kitchener, R (eds.) (1997). Philosophy of psychology. Sage, ISBN 978-0-7619-5305-0
- O'Donohue WT (ed.) (1997). Sexual harassment: Theory, research and treatment. Allyn & Bacon, ISBN 978-0-205-16412-7
- O'Donohue WT (ed.) (1997). Learning and behavior therapy. Allyn & Bacon, ISBN 978-0-205-18609-9
- Laws DR, O'Donohue WT (eds.) (1997). Sexual deviance: Theory, assessment and treatment. Guilford Press, ISBN 978-1-59385-605-2
- O'Donohue WT, Kitchener R (eds.) (1998). Handbook of behaviorism. Academic Press, ISBN 978-0-12-524190-8
- O'Donohue WT, Fisher JE (eds.) (1999). Management and administrative skills for the mental health professional. Academic Press, ISBN 978-0-12-524195-3
- Cummings NA, O'Donohue WT, Hayes S, Follette V (eds.) (2001). The history of the behavioral therapies: Founders Personal Histories. Context Press, ISBN 978-1-878978-40-0
- O'Donohue WT, Ferguson K (2001). The psychology of B.F. Skinner. Academic Press, ISBN 978-0-7619-1759-5
- Thomas L, Cummings JA, O'Donohue WT (in press). The entrepreneur in psychology: collected papers of Nicolas A. Cummings. Zeig Tucker & Theisen Publishers, ISBN 978-1-891944-92-5
- O'Donohue WT, & Levensky E (eds.) (2002) Handbook of forensic psychology. Basic Books, ISBN 978-0-12-524196-0
- Brunswig K, O'Donohue WT (in press) Relapse prevention therapy for sexual harassers. Sage, ISBN 978-0-306-47259-6
- O'Donohue WT, Henderson DA, Byrd M, Cummings NA (eds.) (2002). Behavioral integrative care: treatments that work in the primary care setting. Allyn & Bacon, ISBN 978-0-415-94946-0
- O'Donohue WT, Ferguson K (eds.) (2003). Handbook of professional ethics. Academic Press, ISBN 978-0-7619-1189-0
- Cumming, NA, O'Donohue WT, Ferguson K (eds.) (2002). The impact of medical cost offset on practice and research: making it work for you. Context Press, ISBN 978-1-878978-41-7
- O'Donohue WT, Fowler KA, Lilienfeld SO (eds.) (2007). Personality disorders: toward the DSM-V. SAGE, ISBN 978-1-4129-0422-3
- O'Donohue WT, Graybat SR (2008). Handbook of contemporary psychotherapy: toward an improved understanding of effective psychotherapy. SAGE, ISBN 978-1-4129-6820-1
- O'Donohue WT, Fisher JE (eds.) (2009). General Principles and Empirically Supported Techniques of Cognitive Behavior Therapy. John Wiley and Sons, ISBN 978-0-470-22777-0
- Cummings N, O'Donohue WT, Cummings J (eds.) (2009). Psychology's War on Religion. Zeig Tucker & Theisen Inc, ISBN 978-1-934442-26-5

=== Journal articles ===
- O'Donohue, William (2003). "Psychological skills training: Issues and controversies". The Behavior Analyst Today. 4 (3). J.D. Cautilli: 331–335. doi:10.1037/h0100021. Pdf.
