= James E. Banta =

American health scientist

James E. Banta is an American health scientist and the first to cultivate dengue virus in tissue culture and to demonstrate cytopathogenic effect. He was also the Dean, School of Public Health and Tropical Medicine from Tulane University subsequently after being elected as Fellow at the American Association for the Advancement of Science in 1959.
