= James Pendleton =

James or Jim Pendleton may refer to:

- James Madison Pendleton (1811–1891), Baptist preacher, educator and theologian
- James M. Pendleton (1822–1889), U.S. Representative from Rhode Island
- Jim Pendleton (1924–1996), American baseball player
