= James W. Le Duc =

James W. Le Duc (a.k.a. James W. LeDuc) is an American virologist and epidemiologist. He is an adjunct professor in the Department of Microbiology & Immunology at the University of Texas Medical Branch (UTMB), and the former director of the Galveston National Laboratory, one of the largest active biocontainment facilities in the United States.

== Education and career ==
Le Duc has a 1967 bachelor's degree in zoology from California State University, Long Beach. After a master's degree in infectious and tropical diseases from the University of California, Los Angeles (UCLA), received in 1972, he continued at UCLA for a Ph.D. in epidemiology, completed in 1977.

Le Duc worked as a researcher for the United States Army Medical Research and Development Command and for the Centers for Disease Control and Prevention, before becoming a full professor at UTMB, where he held the John Sealy Distinguished University Chair in Tropical and Emerging Virology. He was also director of the Galveston National Laboratory. He retired from his professorship and directorship to become an adjunct professor in 2021.

== Recognition ==
Le Duc was a 1974 recipient of the Paul A. Siple Award of the US Army Science Conference.

He is a Fellow of the Infectious Diseases Society of America.
