= James X. Zhan =

International trade and economics specialist

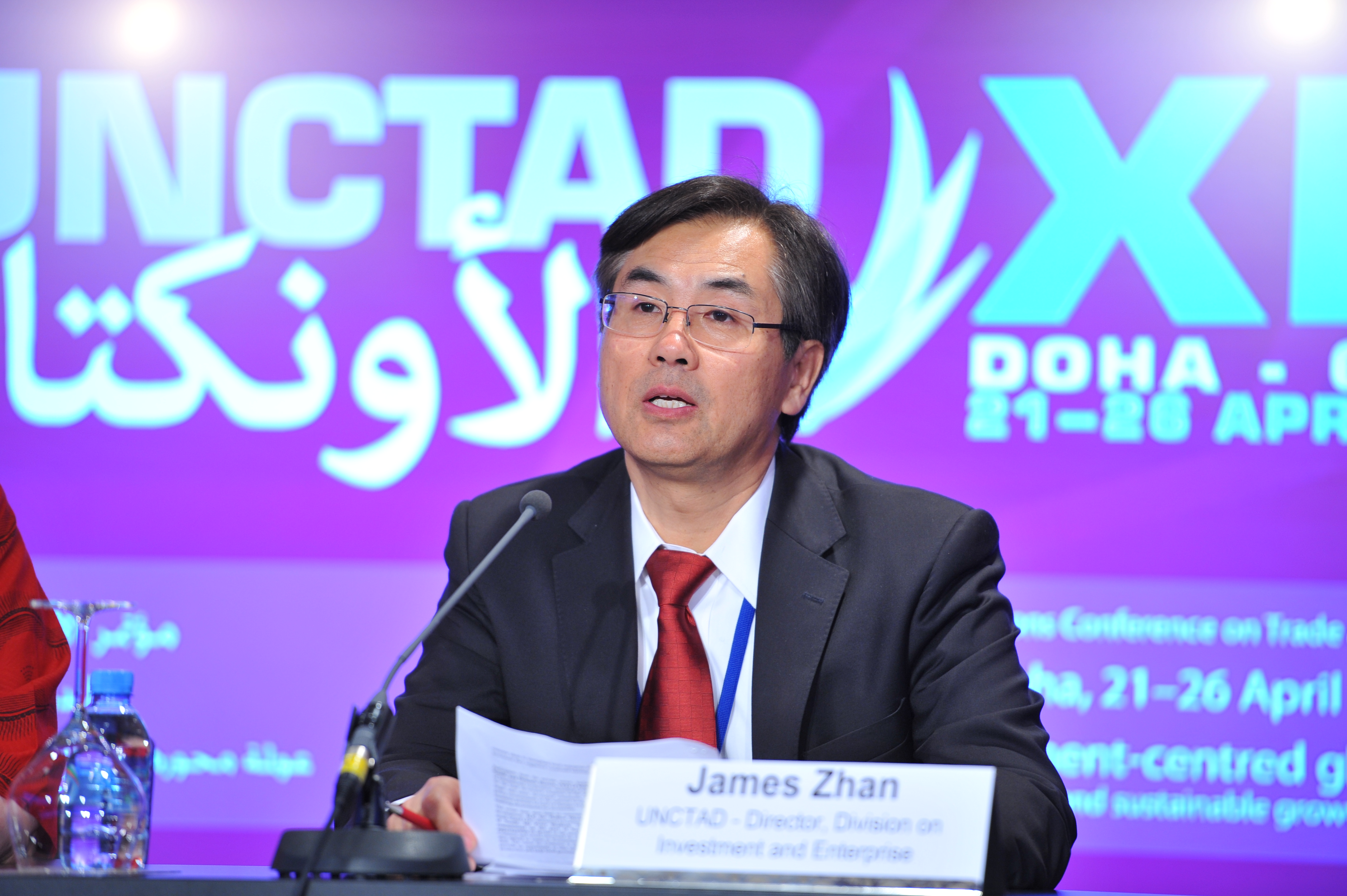

Academic work
- Discipline: Investment, trade, technology, entrepreneurship, corporate governance, business facilitation
- Institutions: United Nations (UNCTAD)

James X. Zhan has been Director of Investment and Enterprise at the United Nations Conference on Trade and Development (UNCTAD) since 2009. He also leads the preparation of the annual World Investment Report.

Zhan has expertise in trade, investment and development strategies. He has directed extensive research and analysis on key emerging issues; facilitated the formulation of outcomes at various summits (e.g. UN, G20, ACP, APEC, ASEAN, BRICS, Commonwealth); and provided technical assistance to governments and institutions (including cabinets) in over 160 countries.

He led the formulation of global guidelines for investment policies, which have been used by over 100 countries, including the Investment Policy Framework for Sustainable Development, Reform Package for the International Investment Regime, Global Investment Facilitation Action Menu, Guiding Principles for Global Investment Policymaking, and Entrepreneurship Policy Framework. He initiated the establishment of the UNCTAD World Investment Forum in 2008.

He chairs the Governing Board of the UN Sustainable Stock Exchanges Initiative (with all major stock exchanges worldwide as members). He is chief strategic advisor for the World Association of Investment Promotion Agencies.

He is also editor-in-chief of the journal Transnational Corporations. He has held advisory positions with academic institutions, including Cambridge University, Columbia University, Cornell University, Geneva University, and was research fellow at Oxford University. He was also member of the Advanced Manufacturing Council, and the Trade and Investment Council of the World Economic Forum.

He has published extensively on trade and investment-related economic and legal issues. He is a regular speaker at high-level policy, academic and business forums, as well as parliaments. He appears frequently in international media outlets.
