= James Nevels =

American businessman and philanthropist

James E. Nevels
- Born: Greensboro, Alabama
- Occupations: Business executive; Entrepreneur
- Title: Chairman of The Swarthmore Group

James E. "Jim" Nevels is an American business executive, entrepreneur, and philanthropist. As a businessman, he is known as the founder of The Swarthmore Group. He is the former chairman of The Federal Reserve Bank of Philadelphia and former chairman of the board of The Hershey Company.

== Early life ==
Nevels was born in Alabama.

Nevels earned a scholarship to study at Bucknell University. and graduated with an AB degree He earned his MBA from Wharton School of the University of Pennsylvania and his Juris Doctor from the University of Pennsylvania in 1978.

== Business career ==
=== Wall Street ===
Nevels was recruited by a client of the law firm and moved to work on Wall Street.

=== The Swarthmore Group ===
Nevels started The Swarthmore Group in November 1991. His first client was the City of Birmingham, Alabama.

The Swarthmore Group closed in June 2022 and filed for Chapter 7 bankruptcy protection in August 2022.

=== Business Council For International Understanding (BCIU) ===
Nevels was appointed chair of the Business Council For International Understanding in June 2021.

== Board Roles ==
Nevels has been involved with following boards/organizations:

- Appointed by the President George W. Bush to the advisory committee to the Pension Benefit Guaranty Corporation, he was chairman from 2005 until 2007.
- Appointed by the Governor of Pennsylvania as chairman of the Philadelphia School Reform Commission, served through September 2007.
- Member of the board of The Federal Reserve Bank of Philadelphia from 2010 to 2015
- Deputy chairman of the board of The Federal Reserve Bank of Philadelphia from January 2012 through January 2014.
- Chair of the board of The Federal Reserve Bank of Philadelphia from January 2014 through December 2015.
- Board member, Renew Financial LLC "Board of Directors". Renew Financial LLC.
- Chairman, Business Council for International Understanding (BCIU) June 2021–present
- Board member, Alcoa Corporation from November 2016.
- Board member, Meadwestvaco June 2014–July 2015
- Board member, Westrock January 2015–present"Board of Directors". Westrock.
- Chairman, The Swarthmore Group November 1991 – 2022
- Board member, Pro Football Hall of Fame
- Board member, First Data Corp November 2014–July 2019
- Board member, XL Group October 2017–September/2018
- Lead independent director, The Hershey Company April 2015–May 2017
- Chairman, The Hershey Company February 2009–April 2015
- Board member, Hershey Trust Company January 2007–December 2009
- Chairman, Hershey Trust Company January 2009–December 2015
- Lead director, Hershey Trust Company January 2015–unknown
- Board member, Tasty Baking Company May 2005–May 2011
- Board member, Hershey Company November 2007–February 2009
- Chairman Pension Benefit Guaranty Company January 2005–December 2007
- Board member, Milton Hershey School Trust January 2007–unknown
- Board member, MMG Insurance Company January 2014–unknown
- Manor College Board of Trustees.
- Former board member, Marine Corps Heritage Foundation
- Former board member, The Barbara Bush Foundation for Family Literacy Inc

== Personal life ==
Nevels is married to Dr. Lourene Ann Dellinger Nevels. They have no children. Nevels is a licensed psychologist in private practice, director of a university counseling center, a college professor and published author of children's books and books on psychology.

== Philanthropy ==
=== Bucknell University ===
Nevels and his wife, both class of 1974, endowed the Robert Gross scholarship.

=== Manor College ===
Nevels and his wife, donated to the Manor College Veterinary Technology Program.
