= James Kutsch =

American computer scientist

James Kutsch is an American computer scientist who previously served as the President of The Seeing Eye (2006–2019). As a teenager, he lost his eyesight as the result of a "backyard chemistry experiment that went wrong". He studied at West Virginia University, gaining a BSc in psychology and an MSc in Computer Science, before attending the University of Illinois, where he was awarded a PhD in Computer Science. As part of his PhD he designed the first talking computer for the blind, and also developed one of the earliest screen readers. After graduation, he held a number of roles with AT&T. In 1996 Kutsch became Vice President of at Convergys Corporation, and was promoted to Vice President of Strategic Technology in 2003. From the 1990s onwards he served as a member of the board of trustees of The Seeing Eye, and in 2006 became its first blind President.

He retired from The Seeing Eye in 2019.
