= James M. O'Brien =

American politician

Mayor of Revere, Massachusetts
- In office 1935–1939
- Preceded by: Andrew A. Casassa
- Succeeded by: Laurence J. Gillis

Personal details
- Born: 1890 Cambridge, Massachusetts
- Died: March 4, 1958 (aged 68) Jamaica Plain
- Party: Democratic
- Occupation: Streetcar conductor

James M. O'Brien (1890–1958) was an American politician who served as mayor of Revere, Massachusetts.

== Early life ==
O'Brien was born in 1890 in Cambridge, Massachusetts. He served in the armed forces during World War I. Prior to entering politics he worked as a conductor the Bay State Street Railway and served as president and business agent of the railway's Carmen's Union.

== Politics ==
In 1920, O'Brien was named Revere's assistant commissioner of public works. He was fired by mayor John E. Walsh in November 1925. The following month the Revere city council granted him a permit to open a gas station.

In 1929, O'Brien was elected city treasurer. During his tenure, O'Brien, a Democrat, clashed with the city's Republican mayor Andrew A. Casassa. In 1934, O'Brien challenged Casassa in the city's first nonpartisan election. He topped the ticket in the four-way primary election which also included former state senator Conde Brodbine and state representative Thomas F. Carroll. Crime was the main issue during the campaign, specifically the unsolved murders of two well-known Revere men. In the general election, O'Brien defeated Casassa 7,564 votes to 5,552.

O'Brien was inaugurated on January 7, 1935. Immediately after taking office, O'Brien removed the entire board of health, fired most of the welfare department, and dismissed nine police officers who had recently been hired by the outgoing mayor. He also requested investigators from the state welfare department to look into everyone who was receiving public aid.

On July 15, 1935, O'Brien was beaten unconscious in his living room by former New England middleweight boxing champion Bob Jasse. Jasse had been fired from his job as a special officer at Suffolk Downs earlier that day and blamed O'Brien. O'Brien suffered a concussion, facial contusions, and a broken nose. Jasse claimed that O'Brien had struck him first after O'Brien accused him of spreading rumors that he had stole $12,000 while serving as city treasurer to use on his mayoral campaign. Jasse was found not guilty of assault and battery with intent to murder, but was convicted on the lesser charge of assault and battery. He was sentenced to 18 months in the Deer Island House of Correction.

== Investigations and conviction ==
On October 14, 1935, the Massachusetts Division of Accounts reported a cash shortage of $13,277.04 in the accounts of the city treasurer during the period O'Brien held that office. On January 27, 1936, O'Brien claimed that the shortage was only $107.63, as $12,401.51 in unaccounted money had been found sitting in a tin box in the treasurer's safe and another $749.90 was due to bad checks that the city was now trying to collect. He denied embezzling the money, but admitted to rarely balancing or auditing the accounts and relying on his personal secretary, who didn't have any bookkeeping experience. Nonetheless, O'Brien was reelected in 1936. On October 30, 1937, O'Brien appointed his personal secretary, Josephine M. Farrell, to the position of city auditor. She was the first woman to ever hold this position.

On November 23, 1937, gambler and racketeer Louis Gaeta was murdered. O'Brien controversially ordered that the flags on public buildings be lowered to half staff in honor of Gaeta. Following the murder, Governor Charles F. Hurley issued what The Boston Globe called "the most drastic order against crime ever issued by a Governor of Massachusetts" into illegal activities in Revere. A team of police officers hand-picked by Boston Police Department Captain James T. Sheehan were tasked with "cleaning up" the city over the heads of local police. They were permitted to arrest without question and allowed to investigate in neighboring Boston and Chelsea, if necessary. O'Brien promised full cooperation, to which Sheehan replied "Revere can take care of the drunks".

On January 12, 1938, Massachusetts Attorney General Paul A. Dever requested that the Massachusetts General Court grant the Massachusetts Supreme Judicial Court power to remove a mayor from office for cause, stating that "glaring misfeasance, malfeasance, and nonfeasance" made O'Brien's removal "absolutely necessary". The legislature decided against enacting such a law.

On May 27, 1938, a grand jury indicted O'Brien on charges of larceny and embezzlement of $15,635.43 from the city of Revere. O'Brien proclaimed his innocence and on June 12 announced his campaign for reelection. He was defeated in a landslide by city tax collector Laurence J. Gillis.

On May 4, 1939, O'Brien was found guilty of embezzling $13,277.04 from the city of Revere during his tenure as city treasurer. He was found not guilty of embezzlement and larceny for $2,368.29 in tax payments that O'Brien's successor as treasurer could not find records for. On June 23 he was sentenced to three to five years in Charlestown State Prison. O'Brien appealed his conviction and on March 13, 1940, the Massachusetts Supreme Judicial Court overturned the verdict, ruling that there was not enough evidence for a jury to convict O'Brien.

== Later life and death ==
In 1948, O'Brien returned to city government as a building inspector. He retired a few years later. O'Brien died on March 4, 1958, at the Veterans' Administration Hospital in Jamaica Plain.
