= James Staiano =

New Yorker chef

- Spouse: Marina Staiano
- Culinary career
- Cooking style: Contemporary American
- Rating(s): Michelin stars
- Current restaurant(s): The Madison Room & Bar, New York
- Previous restaurant(s): Istana, New York
- Website: newyorkpalace.com/dining/madisonroom.php

James Staiano is the executive chef of the Madison Room and Bar at the New York Palace Hotel in New York City, where he has worked for 24 years. Under Staiano's culinary leadership, the Madison Room has received two Michelin stars. In the late 1990s Staiano created the menu for Istana, a pan-Mediterranean restaurant in the same location. He has also worked at the Helmsley Palace.

== See also ==
- List of Michelin starred restaurants
