= James Kirkaldy =

Scottish footballer

Personal information
- Full name: James William Kirkaldy
- Date of birth: 8 November 1885
- Place of birth: Newcastle upon Tyne, Northumberland
- Date of death: 17 February 1911 (aged 25)
- Place of death: Newcastle upon Tyne, Northumberland
- Position: Wing half

Senior career*
Years	Team	Apps	(Gls)
1903–1904	Northern Temperance		
1905–1908	Newcastle United	11	(1)
1908–1909	Kilmarnock		
1909	Huddersfield Town		
Total		11	(1)
- * Club domestic league appearances and goals

James William Kirkaldy (8 November 1885 – 17 February 1911) was a British footballer who played in the Football League for Newcastle United.

He worked as a joiner. He died aged 25 in Newcastle.
