= James Spotila =

James Spotila is an American biologist, focusing on biology of sea turtles, crocodiles, salamanders and giant pandas and physiological ecology, biophysical ecology and conservation biology, currently the L. Drew Betz Chair at Drexel University and an Elected Fellow of the American Association for the Advancement of Science.
