= James Specht =

American agronomist (1945–2026)

James Eugene "Jim" Specht (1945 – February 13, 2026) was an American agronomist specializing in soybean genetics, genomics, physiology, and the agronomics of soybean response to water. He was Professor Emeritus and formerly the Francis & Dorothy Haskins and Charles E. Bessey Professor of Agronomy and Horticulture at the University of Nebraska–Lincoln (UNL). He was an elected Fellow of the American Association for the Advancement of Science, the American Society of Agronomy, and the Crop Science Society of America.

== Biography ==
Specht was born in 1945 in western Nebraska and grew up on a farm producing irrigated sugar beets and other crops. His interest in genetics was sparked in 1964 during an undergraduate genetics course at UNL taught by Professor David McGill. He received a B.S. in Agronomy from UNL in 1967, an M.S. in Agronomy from the University of Illinois in 1971, and a Ph.D. in Genetics from UNL in 1974. His M.S. studies were interrupted by military service during the Vietnam War, after which he returned to complete his degree before pursuing his doctorate.

Specht joined the UNL faculty in 1974 as a soybean physiologist and geneticist. He passed away peacefully at home on February 13, 2026, at the age of 80.

== Personal life ==
Specht married Pamela in 1969, and they remained together for 57 years. Together they traveled extensively, visiting more than 50 countries, and in earlier years camped and hiked through all national parks west of the Rocky Mountains. Specht was preceded in death by his parents Henry and Lydia, his brother Montgomery, and his sister Melanie. He is survived by his wife Pam, his brother Terry Specht, and numerous nieces and nephews. Following a service at Braman Mortuary in Omaha, he was interred at Omaha National Cemetery with full military honors.

== Research ==
Specht's research interests centered on plant genetics and genomics, plant physiology, crop production, and the interactions among these fields, with a career-long focus on soybean.

=== Soybean genomics ===
Specht was a member of the national research team that developed the first soybean genetic map of 20 linkage groups (Cregan et al., 1999), subsequently upgraded to 1,845 markers plus 150 classical markers (Song et al., 2004). He was also a member of the team that sequenced the soybean genome, a landmark achievement published in 2010 that made soybean one of the few major crop species with a fully sequenced genome. Later work included using genomics to identify genes governing soybean seed protein and oil content, and serving as a lead principal investigator in developing the national Nested Association Mapping (NAM) populations as a resource for the soybean genetics research community.

=== Soybean response to water ===
Specht discovered that soybean yield response to a gradient of water supply—from scarcity to abundance—was exceptionally linear, and that genotypes differed in that response in ways that made some better suited to drought-prone environments and others to irrigated or high-rainfall conditions. These findings, reported in two seminal papers (Specht et al., 1986 and 2001), established that soybean response to water is a genetically controlled trait.

=== Agronomic practice ===
Early in his career, Specht helped Nebraska soybean growers optimize irrigation for yield and profitability. He became a leading advocate for earlier soybean planting dates, and his research-based recommendations contributed to shifting the average planting date across Nebraska and the Midwest from mid-May to mid-April. He also organized the development of SoyWater, an online tool launched in 2010 to help producers implement just-in-time irrigation, which attracted more than 1,100 registered users across Nebraska and other Corn Belt states.

== Selected publications ==
Over a career spanning more than five decades, Specht authored or co-authored 155 refereed journal articles, achieving a Google Scholar h-index of 71 as of August 2025. Among his most cited works:

- Schmutz, J., Cannon, S.B., et al. (2010). Genome sequence of the paleopolyploid soybean (Glycine max (L.) Merr.). Nature 463:178–183. (4,946 citations)
- Salvagiotti, F., Cassman, K.G., Specht, J.E., et al. (2008). Nitrogen uptake, fixation, and response to fertilizer N in soybeans: A review. Field Crop Research 108:1–13. (1,520 citations)
- Cregan, P.B., Jarvik, T., et al. (1999). An integrated genetic linkage map of the soybean. Crop Science 39:1464–1490. (1,399 citations)
- Specht, J.E., Chase, K., et al. (2001). Soybean response to water: A QTL analysis of drought tolerance. Crop Science 41:493–509. (759 citations)

== Awards and honors ==
- Fellow, American Association for the Advancement of Science (1987)
- Fellow, American Society of Agronomy (1988)
- Fellow, Crop Science Society of America (1989)
- Agronomic Achievement Award, American Society of Agronomy (1994)
- Crop Science Research Award, Crop Science Society of America (1996)
- Louise Pound–George Howard Distinguished Career Service Award, University of Nebraska–Lincoln (2015)
- Outstanding Achievement Award, United Soybean Board (2016)
