= James Rosette =

American boxer

Personal information
- Born: July 9, 1938 Jennings, Louisiana, United States
- Died: May 26, 2019 (aged 80)

Sport
- Sport: Boxing

James Rosette (July 9, 1938 – May 26, 2019) was an American boxer. He competed in the men's middleweight event at the 1964 Summer Olympics. At the 1964 Summer Olympics, he lost to Joe Darkey of Ghana.
