= James Whitfield =

James Whitfield may refer to:

- James Whitfield (bishop) (1770–1834), Roman Catholic Bishop of Baltimore, 1828–1834
- James Whitfield (Mississippi politician) (1791–1875), Governor of Mississippi, 1858–1859
- James B. Whitfield (1860–1948), Florida lawyer and justice of the Florida Supreme Court
- James Monroe Whitfield (1822–1871), African American poet, abolitionist and political activist
- James Whitfield, principal of Colleyville Heritage High School

== See also ==
- Jimmy Whitfield (1919–1984), English footballer
