= James Tuttiett =

British businessman (born 1963)

James Edward Tuttiett (born October 1963) is a British businessman, who through his company, E&J Estates, owns the freehold of 40,000 residential properties in the UK.

== Early life ==
James Edward Tuttiett was born in October 1963.

== Career ==
Tuttiett founded E&J Estates in 1991.

According to data from Companies House, Tuttiett is a director of 85 companies, and often the only director, that own the freehold of numerous large developments in UK cities including Newcastle, Birmingham, Leeds, Coventry and London.

== Personal life ==
Tuttiett lives in a "listed property in an exclusive part of Hampshire near Winchester, surrounded by his own vineyard".

== See also ==
- Mike Greene, former business partner and Brexit Party candidate
