= James Marriott (disambiguation) =

James Marriott (born 1997) is an English musician.

James Marriott may also refer to:

- Sir James Marriott (judge) (1720–1813), British judge, politician and scholar
- James Henry Marriott (1790–1870), New Zealand theatre manager
- James Marriott (author) (1972–2012), English film critic and writer
