= James Shortle =

American economist

James Shortle is an American economist, currently Distinguished Professor at Pennsylvania State University.

== Bibliography ==
- John C. Bergstrom; Stephen J Goetz; James S. Shortle (May 13, 2013). Land Use Problems and Conflicts: Causes, Consequences and Solutions. Routledge. ISBN 9780415700283.
