= James MacCash =

James MacCash (1834–1922) was the founder of the Order of Scottish Clans and founded it while celebrating his birthday in St. Louis in 1878. Born in Springburn, Glasgow, Scotland, he emigrated to the United States of America in 1865. He died at St. Louis, Missouri, and is interred at Bellefontaine Cemetery.
