= James Derriman =

British writer and barrister (1922–2007)

James Parkyns Derriman (19 February 1922 – 28 July 2007) was a British writer on law and public relations. He lived in Morden, Surrey. During the Second World War, Derriman served in the Merchant Navy and was then a journalist at the Daily Herald, Reuters and the News Chronicle.

Derriman was born in London on 19 February 1922. He worked as a barrister-at-law at Lincoln's Inn from 1947. He has also worked in public relations: he was an associate director of the advertising agency J. Walter Thompson during 1961–1962 before moving to Charles Barker City Ltd, where he was their associate director during 1964–1965 and joint managing director from 1968 until 1973. Derriman was also president of the Institute of Public Relations from 1973 until 1974, and was awarded the President's Medallist of the IPR in 1978. He retired in 1982.

His first book, Pageantry of the Law (1955), explained the origins and history of the ceremonial customs of English law and the traditional costumes of various law officers. His 1969 work, Company–Investor Relations, detailed the correct procedures on dealing with the announcement of profit figures, takeover bids and shareholders' meetings. It was described as an excellent guide to the subject by Oliver Marriott in The Times.

Derriman died on 28 July 2007, at the age of 85.

== Works ==
- Pageantry of the Law (London: Eyre & Spottiswoode, 1955).
- Discovering the Law (London: University of London Press, 1962).
- Public Relations in Business Management (London: University of London Press, 1964).
- Company–Investor Relations (1969).
- (with George Pulay), The Bridge Builders: Public Relations Today (London: Associated Business Press, 1979).
