= James Oldshue =

American chemical engineer (1925-2007)

James Young Oldshue (April 1925 – January 16, 2007) was a chemical engineer with more than a hundred publications in scientific journals, numerous book chapters in textbooks and manuals, many patents, and an important textbook of his own, Fluid Mixing Technology Oldshue completed his B.S., M.A., and Ph.D. at the Illinois Institute of Technology in Chicago although his education was interrupted by service on the Manhattan Project from 1944 to 1945 in World War II. From 1950 to 1992, Oldshue worked as vice president and director of research at Lightnin' Mixers Corporation of Rochester, New York and gave his time to both national and international engineering societies, winning numerous engineering awards and honorary degrees including service as president of the American Institute of Chemical Engineers in 1979 and election to the prestigious National Academy of Engineering in 1980. In addition, Oldshue gave extensively of himself to his church and the YMCA. He served on the North American Alliance of Reformed Churches and was a member of its Board of Foreign Missions. He worked locally for the YMCA in Rochester and visited more than forty different YMCAs in other countries as part of his work for the national YMCA organization and its efforts to support and stabilize YMCAs in the Middle East and Africa.

In his last years, Oldshue continued to teach technical seminars and taught his fellow seniors through the O.A.S.I.S. program funded by Lord and Taylor, offering a course called Science Made Simple in Rochester, Sarasota, Florida and Portland, Oregon. He is survived by his wife, Betty, his three sons, Paul, Richard, and Robert, and seven grandchildren.

He died at Sarasota Memorial Hospital in Sarasota, Florida, after a brief illness.
