= James Luckcock =

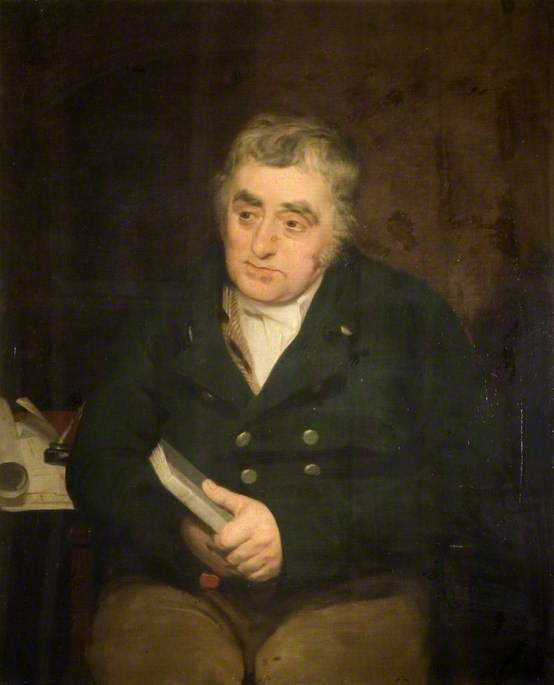
James Luckcock by "British School"

James Luckock (27 October 1761 – 27 April 1835) was an English jeweller. He became well known in Birmingham for his activities in political and educational reform.

== Life ==
Luckock was born in Birmingham, England, on 24 October 1761, went to school at Winson Green Academy and then travelled in France for some time in order to learn French. When he returned to Birmingham he completed an apprenticeship with Benjamin May, a Birmingham-based plater, and set up a buckle-making business with his brother Joseph. This proved unsuccessful, so James Luckock turned his hand to the jewellery trade and eventually his business in St Paul's Square in Birmingham thrived, having made a profit of £2000 in 1813. He married Mary Richards in July 1795 and together they had four children: Urban, Felix, Howard and Irene. He died on 27 April 1835 at the age of 73.

== Interests ==
Luckcock was involved in the development of the Birmingham Brotherly Society in 1796, which trained Sunday-school pupils to become Sunday-school teachers. He was also a founding member of the Birmingham Society for Constitutional Information, and one of the signatories of a letter from the Birmingham group cited in evidence at the trial of Thomas Hardy.

== Legacy ==
Birmingham Museums describe Luckcock as a "jeweller and button-maker". As well as making buttons, he also collected them, accumulating 500 buttons of different styles, sizes and materials. Most of the buttons in Luckock's collection were made for men's coats or waistcoats, as women's garments did not normally use buttons at the time. The collection was donated to Birmingham Museum and Art Gallery.
