= James Yems =

New Zealand politician

James Yems (1812 – 10 September 1868) was a New Zealand auctioneer and politician. He came to Wellington on 24 May 1841 on Lord William Bentinck, and in 1842 moved to Taranaki. Until 1845, Yems was a auctioneer, but then moved to South Australia. He returned to New Zealand later, and was elected to the Taranaki Provincial Council for New Plymouth in 1861, a position which he held until 1863. On 26 January 1864 a meeting was held to replace Yems in the Provincial Council. Warwick Weston was elected unanimously.

== Election ==
On 10 June 1861, there was a nomination meeting to decide the candidates for the 'Town of New Plymouth' ward of the Taranaki Provincial Council. 6 people were nominated, with there being 4 places available in the ward. The candidates proposed were incumbent and former MP Francis Gledhill, incumbent Edward Larwill Humphries, provincial representative of 'Grey and Bell' George Yates Lethbridge, Walt, later representative Warwick Weston, and Yems. A show of hands conducted was in favour of Gledhill, Humphries, Watt, and Yems. However, Weston demanded a poll. The results on the poll were: (Note: Watt and Weston's results do not appear in the source.)

Ranking	Party	Name	No. of votes
1.	Independent	James Yems	69
2.	Independent	Francis Gledhill	66
3.	Independent	Edward Larwill Humphries	63
4.	Independent	George Yates Lethbridge	43
