= James Flawn =

James Flawn (1837–1917) was an English restaurateur and tent revivalist who was largely involved with the Salvation Army from 1865 to his death.

Flawn was born 1937, the eldest child surviving past infancy, of Huguenot weavers James Daniel Flawn and Harriet Wilson.

Flawn was orphaned and in poverty at an early age, and took motivation to help the hungry from his childhood. He was a member of the Huguenot "Christian Community".

Flawn was a worker at the Tent Mission before William Booth took over.

He remained with Booth after he became the leader of the East London Special Services Commission. In April 1870 Flawn became manager of the soup kitchen attached to the Peoples Mission Hall.

Flawn owned a restaurant in Pudding Lane where William and Catherine Booth dined regularly, until they moved from Hammersmith to Hackney.

In 1871 Flawn, with fifteen-year-old Bramwell Booth who kept the books, administered the five East London outlets of the mission, known as Food-for-the-Million shops.

Flawn headed up the catering for the International Training College for Salvation Army workers at the Congress Hall in Lower Clapton, known as "Commissary Flawn".

Flawn is mentioned in William Booth: Soup, Soap, and Salvation, a dramatised biography of Booth, and in Seven dark rivers and the Salvation Army.
