= James Braithwaite =

English physician and writer

- Born: 1838; Leeds
- Died: 7 March 1919 (aged 80–81); Leeds
- Occupations: Physician, writer

James Braithwaite (1838 – 7 March 1919) was an English obstetric physician, surgeon and cancer researcher best known for his research on salt and its relation to health.

== Biography ==
Braithwaite obtained his M.D. from London University. He was an obstetric physician and surgeon to the Leeds General Infirmary. He was a lecturer on Obstetric Medicine in the Leeds School of Medicine and was editor of the Retrospect of Medicine journal. Braithwaite was a Fellow and vice-president of the Obstetrical Society of London. He was a surgeon to the Leeds Hospital for Women and Children. His father was William Braithwaite (1807–1885), a physician and surgeon from Leeds. He was a Member of the Royal College of Surgeons of England and a Licentiate of the Apothecaries of London.

Braithwaite published a series of papers in The British Medical Journal and The Lancet, which argued that excessive consumption of salt is an essential factor of four factors that cause cancer. The other factors are overnutrition from consuming too much food such as meat, senility or effeteness of the cells and local irritation. He held the view that excess salt is an essential factor but one or two of the other co-operative factors would need to occur with it to cause cancer in the body.

Braithwaite stated that cancer is caused by the excessive use of salt in the diet and cancer is most abundant in those who consume lots of pork. Braithwaite argued that non-civilized people who do not eat salt do not get cancer and that Jewish women have low incidence of uterus cancer because they use little salt and abstain from salty foods like bacon and ham.

Braithwaite's salt and diet theory held that poorer people cannot afford much meat and consume less salt thus they have a low cancer mortality. To support this he cited cancer mortality data from different geographical area in the United Kingdom. For example, after visiting the Picking district which had a high cancer mortality rate it was found that the diet of its residents was meat several times a day with bacon being a staple food. Braithwaite also stated that cancer is unknown among wild animals but is found in domesticated animals because of the salty food they are fed. He concluded that people should consume as little as salt as possible and get plenty of fresh air to prevent cancer. Several physicians disagreed with Braithwaite's theory and there was a heated correspondence about the subject in the British Medical Journal, in 1902.

Braithwaite died in Leeds from pneumonia on 7 March 1919.

== Selected publications ==
- On the Micro-Organism of Cancer (The Lancet, 1895)
- The Question of Table Salt in Chronic Gout (British Medical Journal, 1898)
- Excess Of salt in the Diet as a Cause of Cancer (British Medical Journal, 1902)
- Excess of Salt in the Diet a Probable Factor in the Causation of Cancer (The Lancet, 1901)
- Is Salt a Probable Cause of Cancer? (The Lancet, 1902)
- Excess of Salt in the Diet: With Three Other Factors, the Probable Causes of Cancer (London, 1902)
- Salt as a Possible Cause of Cancer (London, 1902)
- Cancer Mortality (British Medical Journal, 1903)
