= James Avery (disambiguation) =

James Avery (1945–2013) was an American actor.

James or Jim Avery may also refer to:

- James Avery (American colonist) (1620–1700), Connecticut colonist, legislator, and military commander
- James Avery (baseball) (born 1984) Canadian baseball player
- James Avery (Medal of Honor) (1825–1898), American Civil War sailor and Medal of Honor recipient
- James Avery (musician) (1937–2009), American and German pianist and conductor
- James Avery, American jeweler and founder of the company James Avery Artisan Jewelry
- Jim Avery (American football) (born 1944), American football player
- Jim Avery (politician), member of the Missouri House of Representatives
- James Avery (pilot boat), 19th century Sandy Hook pilot boat
