= James McEvoy =

James McEvoy may refer to:

- James McEvoy (philosopher) (1943–2010), Irish philosopher

== See also ==
- James McAvoy (born 1979), Scottish actor
