= James Nuckolls =

American lighting designer, author and educator

James L. Nuckolls (1938 – July 30, 1987) was an American lighting designer, author and educator. Nuckolls was influential in the establishment of the lighting design field in higher education. He authored the 1976 book Interior Lighting for Environmental Designers, which is considered to be the first textbook in the field of architectural lighting design.

== Education and work ==
Nuckolls was born in San Francisco in 1938. He graduated from the University of California, Berkeley, with a degree in economics before completing a Master of Fine Arts in theater at Carnegie-Mellon University in 1964. He worked as a theater lighting designer in New York City until 1966, when he co-founded the lighting design firm Gersztoff, Nuckolls & Warfell. Throughout the 1970s, he worked as an architectural consultant and a lighting designer, including for the engineering firms Syska Hennessy and Bolt, Beranek and Newman

In 1969, Nuckolls and fourteen other working lighting designers met to discuss forming a professional organization. This group officially incorporated as The International Association of Lighting Designers in 1971.

== Teaching and writing ==
Nuckolls began teaching at Parsons School of Design in 1973, the same year the school merged with The New School for Social Research. Parsons had recently disbanded its Department of Interior Design and, under the direction of chair Allen Tate, restructured its programs into a new Department of Environmental Design. The goal of the new program was to encourage a more interdisciplinary interior design practice embedded in social science research, operating across traditional boundaries between architecture, interior design, landscape architecture and the environment. In the new interdisciplinary Environmental Design department, Nuckolls taught project-based lighting design classes, initially in the school's continuing education program.

During this period, Nuckolls served as the first lighting editor of Interiors magazine. He published Interior Lighting for Environmental Designers in 1976. Often called the field's first textbook, Interior Lighting combined technical approaches to electrical lighting with the application of aesthetic, social, and psychological issues in environmental design. The success of Interior Lighting and Nuckoll's teaching helped Allen Tate convince the administration at Parsons to officially establish a program in Lighting Studies. In 1984, the program began offering an MFA in Lighting Design, which was the first degree of its kind.

== Death and legacy ==
Nuckolls died in 1987 from AIDS-related complications. Before his death, he had been named as an honorary board member by Design Industries Foundation Fighting AIDS (DIFFA). In 1988, The Nuckolls Fund for Lighting Education was established. The fund offers grants to researchers, colleges, and universities to establish programs in higher education to expand the field of lighting design.

In 2016, Architectural Lighting magazine published a special issue, called "30 Moments in Lighting," chronicling the most important developments in the field since 1986. The issue featured two articles about Nuckolls's contributions, as founder of the discipline's first institution of higher education, and as co-founder of the IALD. In 2001, the publication inducted Nuckolls into their Hall of Fame based on his key role in organizing architectural lighting design as a field.

== Bibliography ==
- James L. Nuckolls (1976). Interior Lighting for Environmental Designers. New York: John Wiley & Sons. ISBN 9780471651635.
- Nuckolls, James L.; Gordon, Gary (1995). Interior Lighting for Designers (3rd ed.). New York: John Wiley & Sons.
