= James Broach =

American biochemist and molecular biologist

James R. Broach is an American biochemist and molecular biologist currently at Pennsylvania State University and is an Elected Fellow of the American Association for the Advancement of Science and American Academy of Microbiology.
