= James B. Brandt =

American politician (1909–1983)

James Bowen Brandt

Member of the South Carolina House of Representatives from the Allendale County district
- In office 1967–1974

Personal details
- Born: September 16, 1909 Ulmer, South Carolina, US
- Died: July 15, 1983 (aged 73)
- Party: Democratic
- Spouse: Barbara Ann Thomas
- Children: Cheryl Jean Long
- Occupation: farmer, businessman

James Bowen Brandt (September 16, 1909 - July 15, 1983) was an American politician in the state of South Carolina. He served in the South Carolina House of Representatives from 1967 to 1974, representing Allendale County, South Carolina. He was a businessman and dairyman. He was born in Ulmer, South Carolina, the son of Bowen B. and Jessie (née Black) Brandt and attended Clemson University and the University of South Carolina (B.A. 1937). Brandt died on July 15, 1983, at the age of 73.
