= James Hoyle =

English rugby union player

James Hoyle (born 4 March 1985 in Weymouth) was an English rugby union player for Newcastle Falcons in the Guinness Premiership.

James Hoyle's position of choice is as a centre or on the wing. He is the cousin of upcoming starlet Zack Phillips, who currently plays for Weymouth FC's youth team.
