= James Tepper =

American neuroscientist

James M. Tepper is an American neuroscientist currently a Board of Governors Professor of Molecular and Behavioral Neuroscience and Distinguished Professor at Rutgers University and an Elected Fellow of the American Association for the Advancement of Science.

His research focuses on the anatomy and physiology of the basal ganglia, a large subcortical network in the brain that subserves voluntary motor functions, reward and certain types of learning and memory. Most recently, Professor Teppers's work has concentrated on the physiology and anatomy of the inter neurons in the striatum, a key structure in the function of the basal ganglia.
