= James Stanford =

American artist and photographer

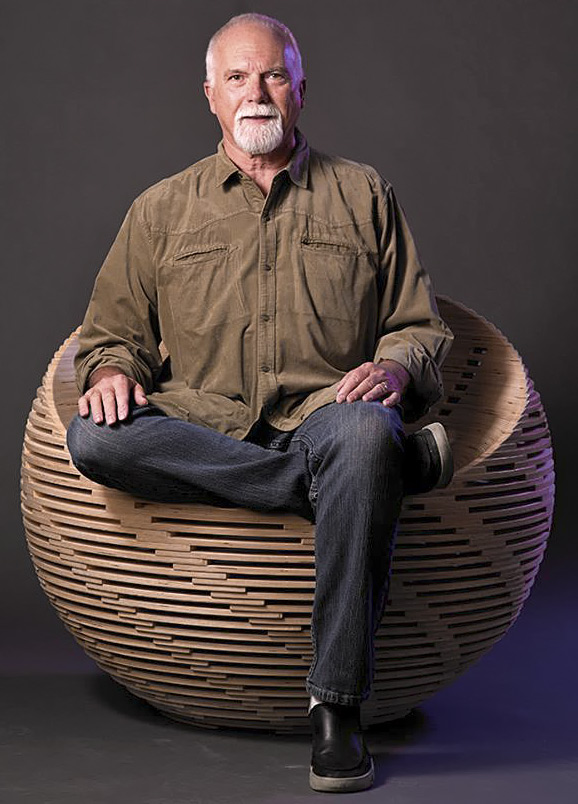
- Born: Las Vegas, Nevada, U.S.
- Known for: photography and contemporary art

James Stanford is an American contemporary artist, photographer, and book publisher based in Las Vegas, Nevada. He is best known for his contemporary work inspired by vintage and historical Las Vegas marquees and signage and also for his leadership in the development of the Las Vegas arts community. Stanford is a Buddhist and his practice draws heavily on the principles and philosophies of Zen Buddhism.

== Early life and education ==
In 1966, Stanford received his diploma from the original Art Deco campus of Las Vegas High School, which was built in 1930, and was designed by George A. Ferris & Son.

In 1971, Stanford earned a Bachelor of Fine Arts degree in painting from the University of Nevada, Las Vegas. He later attended the University of Washington, Seattle, earning a Master of Fine Arts Degree in Painting 1973.

In 1978, he returned to the UNLV campus as an instructor in the Fine Arts Department.

In 1985, Stanford received a Fresco Painting Apprenticeship under the instruction of Lucienne Bloch and Stephen Pope Dimitroff, former assistants to Diego Rivera, during his mural projects in the United States at the College of Santa Fe, in New Mexico.

== Las Vegas and International Arts Community ==
Stanford is a recognized leader and pioneer of the Las Vegas arts community. He served the City of Las Vegas as chairman of its Arts Commission from 1999 to 2001. During this time, he developed the Downtown Las Vegas "Lightscapes" installation, cited by Art in America as one of the top 20 public art projects of the era.

Stanford also served as president of the Las Vegas Contemporary Arts Collective (popularly known as The CAC; later renamed the Las Vegas Contemporary Arts Center). His Presidency ran from 1996 to 1999. During his time with the CAC, Stanford curated numerous exhibits and organized the collective's day-to-day operations. It was his distinct honor to create the CAC's logo in 2002.

In 2007, Stanford—with Las Vegas Mayor Oscar Goodman, among others—was part of an important round-table event to discuss the future of the Las Vegas Arts District and the First Friday venue.

From December 3, 2009, through January 28, 2010, Stanford's work was featured in the 20th Anniversary Exhibition Your Future Starts Here curated by Jim Stanford. This exhibition was a culmination of the members that have been most influential throughout the 20-year history of the CAC. Jim Stanford curated past and present artwork and narratives of the CAC Board members to highlight their historical significance.

Stanford's artistic works were represented by the Trifecta Gallery Las Vegas until the gallery's closure in 2015.

In 2017, Stanford exhibited Shimmering Zen curated by Elizabeth Herridge Limited during Asian Art in London in conjunction with a book of the same title at the London Library.

Stanford was invited as a special guest speaker at the Format Festival in 2021. In the lecture, he discussed his upbringing in Las Vegas, the pop culture inspirations of the entertainment mecca and the passion behind his artwork.

Stanford has served as a board member and advisory board member for the Goldwell Open Air Museum in Beatty Nevada since its inception in 2001. He created the museum's logo with Milo Duffin through his firm, Stanford and Associates, in 2004.

Stanford was awarded the University of Nevada, Las Vegas, College of Fine Arts' 2023 Hall of Fame. The College of Fine Arts Hall of Fame at UNLV was founded in 2003 to honor distinguished individuals and organizations that have made a profound impact on the arts, including visual and performing arts and/or architecture, in Las Vegas and around the world. Stanford joins honorable inductees including Dave Hickey, Dave Chihuly, Guy Laliberté, The Killers, Ann Margret and Tony Curtis.

He is currently represented by Melissa Morgan Fine Art in Palm Desert, California.

=== Buddhism ===
Stanford was first introduced to Seon Buddhism (Korean Zen) as a young man and has since drawn inspiration for his art from his meditation practice. In 2019, Buddhist journal 'Tricycle: The Buddhist Review' discussed the influence of Buddhism on Stanford's art.

=== Smallworks Gallery + Smallworks Press ===
In 1998, Stanford co-created Las Vegas-based Smallworks Gallery.

In 2006, Stanford founded Smallworks Press, a publishing house specializing in arts and culture publications. In 2018, Smallworks Press, with the help of editor William Shea obtained international distribution through Midpoint (North America), and later IPG (Independent Publishers Group).

Smallworks Press has received critical acclaim for its publications. The Guardian, Evening Standard, Juxtapoz magazine, and The Spectator, amongst others, featured one of the publications: Motel Vegas by Fred Sigman. Motel Vegas received a bronze IPPY award for architecture in 2020. In 2019, Elephant Magazine claimed that Compass of the Ephemeral: Aerial Photography of Black Rock City through the Lens of Will Roger shows "What Burning Man really looks like". Will Roger's book was also featured on Artnet, as well as their podcast, The Art Angle with Andrew Goldstein. Street Art Las Vegas by William Shea and Patrick Lai has received tremendous praise and interactive experiences in downtown Las Vegas.

=== Shimmering Zen and Indra's Jewels series ===
Stanford's Indra's Jewels series has been exhibited widely and received critical praise. Based on the principals of Zen Buddhism, the series uses digital and traditional techniques to realize historic Las Vegas signage and neon as complicated mandala patterns.

In 2016, Los Angeles art critic and curator Mat Gleason reviewed Stanford's Indra's Jewels and related work in The Huffington Post, stating, "It is in the eternal nature of the multiple reflection that this artist has delivered the ultimate rendering of the Vegas experience without resorting to dated design motifs."

In 2017, Stanford exhibited the Indra's Jewels series during his Shimmering Zen exhibition at Asian Art in London 2017, His accompanying book entitled Shimmering Zen was released at The London Library and is part of the library's permanent collection. A book review by Juxtapoz Magazine's editor-in-chief Evan Pricco states, "Stanford's modern take on the mandala creates a stream of dreamlike experiences, abstract but with tiny details that begin to look like familiar sites in every day life."

In 2018, Stanford was recognized as a late-career artist for his photo-montage work and as a contributor to many art publications. The Shimmering Zen exhibition traveled to The Studio, Sahara West Library and the North American book launch was held at The Neon Museum in October 2018.

In 2019, Stanford was featured in a pop-up exhibition at the Quivx Building in the Las Vegas Arts District, which showcased two rotating illuminated backlit lenticulars visible from street levels at all hours of the day.

=== Urban Art ===
Stanford has created site-specific murals that have been accessioned into the permanent archives of the City of Las Vegas and The Neon Museum.

In 2019, Stanford designed a mural, A Phalanx of Angels Ascending to commemorate the iconic Blue Angel statue that watched over downtown Las Vegas for 61 years from its mid-century perch at the Blue Angel Motel. The mural was commissioned by Alison Chambers, the owner of the 705 building, an arts incubator located at 705 North Las Vegas Boulevard. The original 16-foot statue was designed by Betty Willis, who also created the famed 'Welcome to Fabulous Las Vegas' sign. Stanford's installation is over 2,000 square feet, encompassing all three sides of the building, making it viewable from all angles. The 705 building was purchased by the City of Las Vegas in 2021 and was accessioned into the city's permanent art archives in 2022.

The mural has received critical acclaim.

In 2020, Stanford created another monumental mural, From the Land Beyond, inspired by the film, The Seventh Voyage of Sinbad (1958). The mural was commissioned by the Cultural Corridor Coalition as part of the beautification of downtown Las Vegas through public art projects.

The vibrant mural spans 154 x 19 square feet and covers the south wall of The Neon Museum's Reed Whipple building which is located across the street from the museum. The mural pays homage to early Las Vegas hotels, starting with the Stardust Resort & Casino, which when it opened in 1985 was the largest hotel in the world and its iconic sign was donated to the Neon Museum when the hotel closed in 2006. The artwork includes two large Moai carved from lava rock, which pay tribute to the Stardust's Aku Aku Polynesian restaurant and Tiki Bar. Stanford's design also depicts the Dunes' Sultan from the famed hotel and casino, which closed in 1993 making way for the Bellagio, which opened in 1998.

Rob McCoy, president and chief executive officer of The Neon Museum, stated: "James Stanford's wonderful new mural at the Neon Museum is exciting and visually arresting. These are three of the most iconic Las Vegas images - a unique story in the evolution of Las Vegas". The mural is sponsored by Dunn-Edwards Paints, Las Vegas Natural History Museum, The Neon Museum, Frankie's Tiki Room, The Bunkers Group and private donors. Laura Henkel of ArtCulture PR curated the project.

The Neon Museum accessioned the film documenting the mural in 2022.

== Exhibitions ==
- From the Land Beyond Beyond, Reed Whipple Building, Las Vegas, Nevada (2020)
- "A Phalanx of Angels Ascending", The 705 Building, Las Vegas, Nevada (2019)
- "Illuminated Portals", Quivx Building, Las Vegas, Nevada (2019)
- "Anthony James, Marc Denis, James Stanford", Melissa Morgan Fine Art (2018)
- "Shimmering Zen", The Studio, Sahara West Library, Las Vegas, Nevada (2018)
- "Blue Angel: Between Heaven and Earth, Neon Museum," Las Vegas, Nevada (2018)
- "Shimmering Zen, Asian Art in London", London, England (2017)
- "Indra's Jewels", Goldwell Open Air Museum, Red Barn Gallery, Rhyolite, Nevada (2008)
- "Sense of Place", Reed Whipple Cultural Center, Las Vegas, Nevada; Las Vegas Contemporary Arts Collective (2007)
- "Vintage Point", Las Vegas Convention and Business Authority; Las Vegas, Nevada (2007)
- "Wonder", VURB (The Arts Factory), Las Vegas, Nevada (2007)
