= James Fanstone =

British missionary (1890–1987)

James Fanstone (8 August 1890 to 1987) was a British Christian medical missionary in Brazil. In the early 1920s, he served as the only surgeon and doctor in the city of Anápolis and built the first hospital there.

== Early life and education ==
Fanstone was born in Brazil, the son of James Fanstone, a British Christian missionary, and Elizabeth Baird. He grew up in Brighton, England and was home schooled by his mother until age ten. He began playing the organ at the age of eight and became the organist at his local Sunday school. Fanstone continued playing the organ for Sunday school for the rest of his life.

As part of an educational scholarship, Fanstone learned carpentry. When he was 15 his father ceased his travel to Brazil, becoming instead a non-conformist pastor, and the family moved to the country.

Fanstone studied medicine beginning at age 19, living in a hostel run by the Medical Missionary Association in London. During World War I, he treated casualties in Britain and later served in a field ambulance in France for four years.

When the war ended, Fanston resumed his medical training. He graduated with an MD in tropical diseases from the University of London and a diploma in tropical medicine and hygiene. He joined Evangelical Union of South America, and studied theology for two years in Glasgow. In 1922, Franstone married Daisy and the couple moved to Brazil.

== Setting up Anapolis Hospital ==
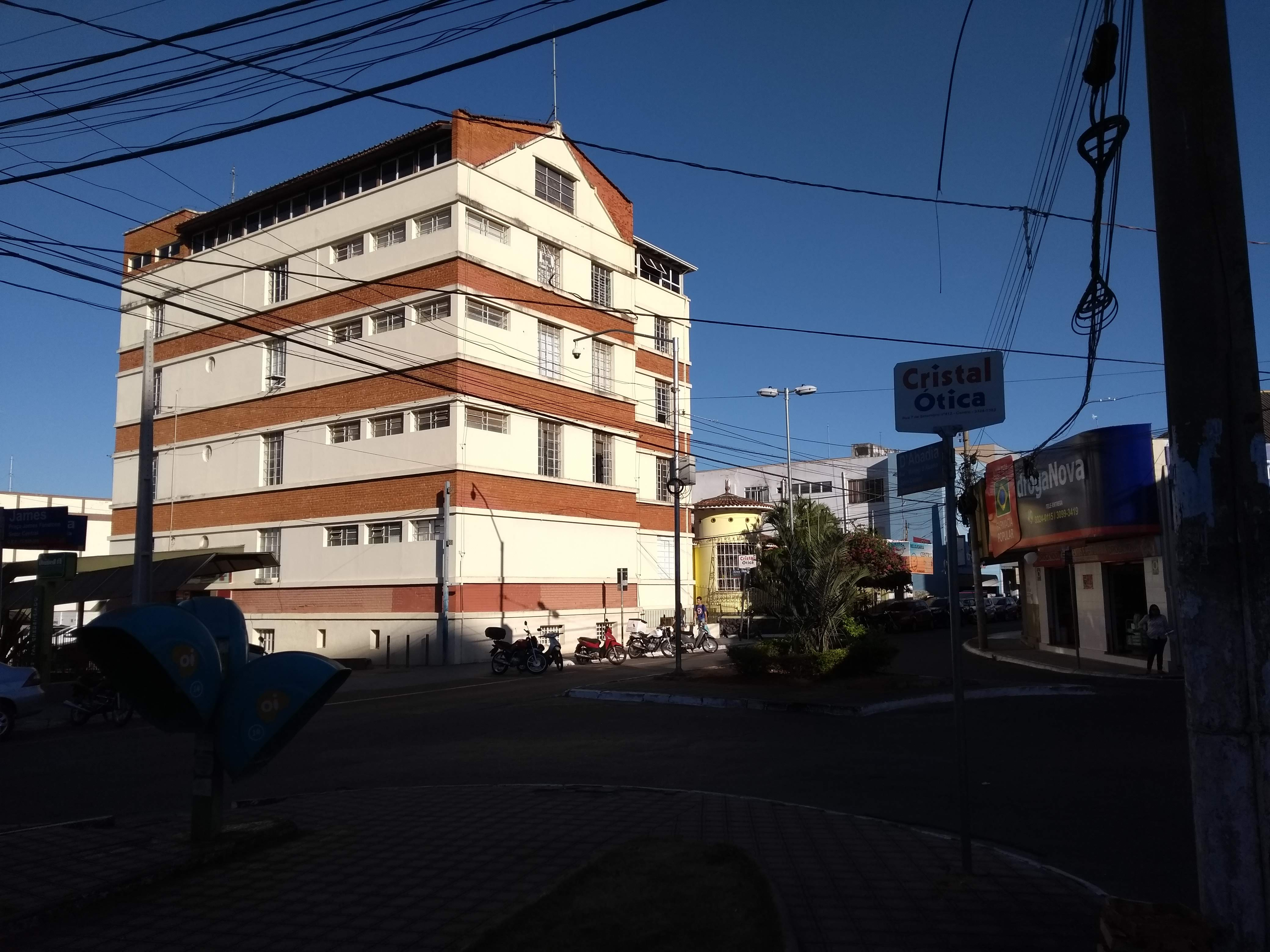
Hospital Evangélico Goiano, the current name of the first hospital of Anápolis

The Fanstones studied Portuguese and James Fanstone obtained medical accreditation in Brazil. In 1924 they traveled to Anápolis, then a small town of 2000 inhabitants in the state of Goias. They set up a medical practice and Franstone built a hospital with the help of local workers. At the time it was the only hospital within 800 miles. By the 1950s, the hospital had 100 beds and about 1000 major operations were performed there each year. By 1981. there were 300 beds and 200 nurses, either serving or in training.

Fanstone eventually designed a six-story hospital building, which he built with the help of local workers trained. The hospital had x-ray and other modern equipment. He included a lake and tennis courts on the hospital grounds for recreation for their nurses. Wealthy patients were charged for surgery; the poor received free treatment. Fanstone planned and supervised the building of other facilities in Anápolis, including church buildings and community projects using locally raised funds.

The Fanstones promoted the Christian gospel, and after 30 years there were 11 Protestant churches in Anápolis. They also started a school and a college which were then run by local residents. The college later became the Evangelical University of Anápolis (now UniEVANGÉLICA). In addition, the Fanstones set up a nursing school in Anápolis.

Daisy Fanstone died in 1971 at age 81. That same year, in recognition of her contribution to education, the governor of Goias named a new 1800 student secondary school after her.

Fanstone lived to over 97 years of age. He co-founded the Help for Brazil Mission.

Fanstone was awarded the Order of the British Empire for his work.
