= James Pernotto =

American artist (born 1950)

James Pernotto (born 1950) is an American contemporary artist; a painter and sculptor, book artist, print-maker, paper-maker, accomplished architectural designer-illustrator, and self-titled "Existential Subliminal Subversive." Pernotto was founding director of Pacifico Gallery in Greenwich Village. He was most notably affiliated as a curator with The Butler Institute of American Art in Youngstown, Ohio. As a university educator, he has worked at Youngstown State University and Penn State University. Pernotto is dually known as a canvas painter and paper sculptor. His works have been described as post-post-modern arte povera. He currently resides in Youngstown, Ohio.

== Career in the 1960s and early 1970s ==
As a student Ohio State University, Pernotto was highly influenced by the pop-art of Rauschenberg, Warhol, and Lichtenstein rendering images from comic books and editorial photography into satirical collage. At that point, he began being featured in national shows including shows at the Print Club in Philadelphia, Pennsylvania, and ColorPrint USA at Texas Tech University.

== Career in the 1970s and 1980s ==
During this time, Pernotto lived in Madison, Wisconsin, and Washington D.C., and worked primarily in painting on hand-made paper, teaching workshops at Parson's School of Design in Lake Placid, New York, and Rutgers University. He was exposed to Chicago imagist painters and non-figurative painters such as Alan Shields and Sam Gilliam whom greatly influenced Pernotto's involvement in Arte Povre. He received his MFA in 1975 from the University of Wisconsin-Madison.

Pernotto's most notable work from this period was a travelling museum commissioned in 1977 by the Madison Art Center entitled "King Toot." This exhibition was a complete sculptural parody of the King Tutankhamun exhibition updated with contemporary artifacts such as the Barbie Selket, Coke adds Ankh vase. King Toot travelled to the International Art Exposition at Navy Pier in Chicago in 1982. Pernotto was featured in the Fendrick Gallery, Allan Frumkin Gallery, and Carl Solway Gallery during this period. He earned a fellowship at PS1 International Studio Program (now MoMA PS1) in 1987.

== Career in the 1990s and 2000s ==
During this period, Pernotto transitioned from painting on hand-made paper to painting primarily on canvas. Initially, paintings were inspired by previously created illustrated book pages in a palimpsest fashion. His work was featured at the Center for Book Arts. He was awarded a 1994 Ohio Arts Council Fellowship and a 1994 National Endowment for the Arts Fellowship. That year, he moved to New York City, and a shift in focus occurred as Science and Technology now combined with History to drive his work.

While in New York City, Pernotto kept a small studio space in the East Village and a studio in the Bronx. Inspired by the book The Mayan Factor by Jose Arguelles, Pernotto began weaving together time and space within his images. Pernotto was the conceptual driving force in the founding of Pacifico Fine Art Gallery on Hudson Street in Greenwich Village, which exhibited emerging and mid-career artists, and operated from 1999 to 2001.

In 2004, Pernotto moved back to his original studio in his hometown of Youngstown, Ohio, where he resumed art production and began the process of documenting his collection. In 2006, The Butler Institute of American Art asked that he exhibit a retrospective show of his works which he entitled "MEME." In 2009, received a Juror's Choice award for his acrylic/photo/wood work titled "S.A.L.T.: Germs, Steel," which depicts a gritty scene from the local steel industry.

Pernotto is just one of several area artists whose works appear in the show.

== Career from 2010–present ==
In 2010, Pernotto launched NEXT Best Art, a non-profit with the mission to create an independently run public gallery, considering the juncture of art and physics, to educate and enhance the cultural community of Downtown Youngstown. Next Best Art is working to establish a home within the Mahoning Valley to embrace the opportunity for a consistent cultural dialogue with the greater worldwide art forum.

In a featured story about Jim Pernotto in the Youngstown Vindicator on August 9, 2014, Editor Todd Franko discusses his downtown apartment and workspace as "It's a fantastic loft space right out of Hollywood central casting for an artist/Bohemian type like Pernotto." The article linked here shows Pernotto's passion for art, Youngstown and especially the downtown urban area, and linking continued development with using art as a vehicle.

On January 10, 2016, Pernotto was scheduled to be celebrating the opening of his latest show at the Butler Institute of American Art in Youngstown Ohio. The show titled "Merkaba" is scheduled to run until the end of February 2016. "Merkaba" opened at the Butler Art Institute with a reception attended by many local artists, media, family and friends. In an article in the Youngstown Vindicator, Guy D'Astolfo writes "The art in the exhibit, titled "Merkaba," merges geometric shapes and patterns with scenes that can be cosmic in scope or theme. The results connect the eternal truths of science with mythology in a way that appears to be both ancient and futuristic". In the same article published on January 7, 2016, Jim Pernotto states "There are three words – Pro Bono Publico – above the doorway at the Butler Institute of American Art," said Pernotto. "We are at a place as individuals, as a city, a country and world, were we need to decide if things can only be done to maximize profit or for the good of the people."

The Butler show was scheduled to run through February 28, 2016.
