= James Griswold =

American politician

James Griswold (February 8, 1828 – May 7, 1892) was an American politician.

James Griswold, eldest surviving son of Colonel Charles Griswold, was born in Old Lyme, Connecticut, on February 8, 1828. His mother was Ellen E., daughter of the Hon. Elias Perkins of New London, Conn. Soon after his graduation from Yale College in 1848, the discovery of gold in California led his steps thither, but in 1851 he returned to his native place, where he was as a lawyer and businessman. He was a Representative in the Connecticut Legislature in 1858, and was a Judge of Probate in 1861–2. He died in Old Lyme on May 7, 1892, in his 65th year.

He was married in June, 1861, to his cousin, Mary R., daughter of Dr. Nathaniel S. Perkins, who died some years before him. One of their daughters is survived them, the other having died in infancy.
