= James P. M. Ntozi =

Ugandan demographer (1946–2021)

James Patrick Manyenye Ntozi was an Ugandan retired academic and farmer. He worked as a researcher in demographics and statistics at Makerere University in Uganda, with his main research projects focusing on the HIV/AIDS epidemic in Africa, fertility, census-taking, and aging and the life cycle. A medical demographer and statistician by training, his areas of expertise include gauging needs assessment, conducting evaluations, and creating baseline studies. After retirement, he took up work as a farmer. In 2011, the book Demography of Uganda and Selected African Countries was published in honor of his research contributions. Professor Ntozi died on Wednesday 19 May 2021 in Kampala, Uganda.

== Education ==
Ntozi attended Mbarara Junior High and High School. In 1971, Ntozi earned his bachelor of science degree in Economics and Statistics from the Institute of Statistics and Applied Economics at Makerere University. Ntozi earned his master's degree at the institute in 1973. He gained his PhD in Medical Demography in 1977 from the University of London.

From 1977 to 1979, Ntozi went to the University of Nairobi because of the political unrest during the reign of Idi Amin. However, many of his colleagues left at the beginning of the regime in the early 1970s while he remained at the university. Ntozi also attended Bishop School Mukono, Busoga College Mwiri, where he met Uganda's current Prime Minister Ruhakana Rugunda, and Oxford University.

== Research ==
Ntozi has more than 75 peer reviewed scientific articles and more than 70 papers presented at conferences. He has also edited over 15 books.

During the early years of Uganda's independence, there was little data on demographics. Ntozi worked on demographics during this period and tried to promote research in the field. His research within demographics has focused on fertility, mortality, migration, and development.

In 1980, Ntozi was the commissioner for Uganda's census, the results of which led to policy changes and the government's demarcation of areas. In the 1990s, Ntozi conducted research on marriage patterns, fertility rates, and the cultural causes and effects of HIV/AIDS. Beginning in the late 1990s, Ntozi began his research on aging. Since then, he has given lectures at international conferences on his research, taught classes on aging, and mentored three PhD students in the subject.

Ntozi helped evaluate the PEPFAR Project in Nigeria for the United States National Academy of Sciences (2005-2007).

Starting in the 2010s, he began researching the impact of HIV/AIDS on Ugandan elderly.

== Makerere University ==
Ntozi served multiple roles at Makerere University from 1979 until his forced retirement in 2016, including lecturer, head of department, dean, member of the university senate, and ambassador of the university. Ntozi served as the director of the Institute of Statistics and Applied Economics for seven years, and he lectured as a Professor of Population Studies, from which he retired in 2016. He has also served as a professor of demographic statistics at the university's College of Business and Management Studies and has been on many university boards.

Ntozi began lecturing for Makerere in 1971 as a Teacher's Assistant while pursuing his master's degree. In October 1992, he was granted full professorship, and in 1995 he fulfilled the university's requirement of professors to give an inaugural lecture by presenting his research on HIV/AIDS. It was considered rare for a professor to complete this requirement within three years of the promotion to full professorship. During his time as a professor, Ntozi has mentored around ten PhD students in demography and mentored students from his affiliated departments as well as from the departments of geography, sociology, gender studies, and public health. He has also served on many university boards.

Ntozi was a part of the university senate for more than 30 years. While on the senate, he fought for the university's departments in statistics and population studies. In 2016, he relinquished his position as Chair of the Makerere University Pensioners' Association (MUPA). While occupying this position, Ntozi advocated for the university's retiree's benefits and pensions.

At the university, he founded the Department of Population Studies. He has also developed all existing programs as of 2017, both undergraduate and graduate, in the School of Statistics and Planning. During his years at Makerere, Ntozi has advanced the demographic and population studies at the university and mobilized resources and donations for the Department of Population Studies from the Rockefeller Foundation, World Bank, International Development Research Centre (IDRC), UNFPA, USAID, UNDP, and Population Council as well as other organizations.

Despite being offered jobs on an international scale, Ntozi has declined all to stay at his alma mater. Because of Makerere University's requirement for professors to retire at the age of 70, Ntozi retired from lecturing in 2016 to work as a farmer. However, upon retirement he asked the university to continue allowing him to conduct research and mentor students at the Center for Population and Applied Sciences.

== Demography of Uganda and Selected African Countries ==
The 276-page book Demography of Uganda and Selected African Countries: Towards more Sustainable Development Pathways was published in 2016 to celebrate Ntozi's service to Makerere University, Uganda, and all of Africa through his research in demographics. Written by scholars in demography and population studies, the book discusses the current needs of Uganda's population. It touches on issues around development, sustainability, and demography while also presenting findings to suggest changes in policies and programs. The editors include Professor John Oucho from the University of Nairobi as the Chief Editor, Associate Professor Dr. Gideon Rutaremwa, and Professor Jockey Baker Nyakaana, among others. The book has 15 writers and 4 editors from many countries and organizations such as Uganda, Tanzania, Kenya, Nigeria, France, and the Uganda National Bureau of Standards.

The launching of the book occurred on 23 March 2017 and was organized by the Makerere College of Business and Management Sciences as well as the Centre for Population and Applied Sciences. It took place in Makerere University's main hall. Prime Minister of Uganda Dr. Ruhakana Rugunda praised Ntozi for his research, claiming that it helped shape Uganda's policy. The two men had been friends for 51 years at this point, since they had met at Busoga College Mwiri. Rugunda declared that Ntozi's work in demographics helped save the country from poverty, and he hailed Ntozi as a promoter of change and progress. The Prime Minister encouraged the staff at Makerere to follow in Ntozi's footsteps, and for other universities to follow Makerere's example. He also asked Makerere to consider using retired professors, like Ntozi, for research, as is common in the US and UK. The Vice Chancellor of Makerere University Professor John Ddumba-Ssentamu thanked Ntozi for elevating the university's status on both a local and global scale.

Ntozi gave a speech as well, thanking his students and the authors of the book for commemorating him during his lifetime. He also thanked the College of Business Management Sciences and the Centre for Population and Applied Statistics for publishing the book and hosting the event. Ntozi expressed his appreciation of the government of Uganda for being supportive of researchers.

Ntozi received a plaque at the ceremony from the Uganda Bureau of Statistics (UBOS), presented by its Executive Director Ben Paul Mungyereza. The plaque was given in appreciation of his work at Makerere University and his support of UBOS. Prime Minister Rugunda gave Ntozi the plaque.

== Achievements ==
Ntozi has been appointed to many international positions at universities and institutions such as Visiting Scholar and Researcher.

== Controversy ==
In 2011, a public dialogue at the Planning House in Kampala was held to discuss the increasing population growth and rates of unemployment. The report "Demography and Economic Growth in Uganda" was presented with a strategy of increased urbanization to boost economic stimulus and slow down population growth. Ntozi spoke out against the report at the dialogue, claiming that urbanization does not lead to economic development as seen by the existing poverty within cities. He also disagreed that electricity in rural areas would reduce population growth.

In 2013, Ntozi called for a census, arguing that it was essential to create a development plan. He dismissed attempts by other researchers to make development plans for Uganda since the last census occurred in 2002.

The Makerere University Retirement Benefits Scheme (MURBS) threatened to strike in 2014 against the university because of delayed payments. Makerere had been failing to pay retirement benefits unless taken to court, so MURBS had been filing cases against the university since 2008. Ntozi encouraged retirees to come together and demand their benefits from Makerere in court.

== Personal life ==
Ntozi was born 25 July 1946 in Mbarara district in Kashari County, Rwobynje.

In 1975, Ntozi married Dr. Ida Ntozi. They have children together.

In March 2021, Ntozi was diagnosed with stage four cancer.

Ntozi died on 19 May 2021 in Kampala, Uganda.
