= James G. Thimmes =

American union activist

James Garrett Thimmes (October 4, 1896 – January 16, 1955) was an American labor unionist.

Born in Hemlock, Ohio, Thimmes left school at 15 and began working in a pottery before taking a job in the steel mills of Youngstown, Ohio, in 1911. He served in the United States Army during World War I. After the war, he relocated to Chicago, where he became a member of the Amalgamated Association of Iron, Steel and Tin Workers.

In 1924, Thimmes became president of his union lodge, and in 1936 he wrote the successful resolution proposing that the union's leadership to work with the Congress of Industrial Organizations (CIO) to establish the Steel Workers' Organizing Committee (SWOC). Thimmes began working full-time for the SWOC, initially in Chicago, and then in California. In 1940, he was appointed as director of the new United Steel Workers of America's (USWA) District 38, covering California, and also as president of the California Industrial Union Council. In this role, he opposed communist involvement in the union movement.

During World War II, Thimmes served on the California War Manpower Commission and Re-employment Commission. In 1946, he was elected as the vice-president of the USWA, and he was later also elected as a vice-president of the CIO. He died in 1955, still in office.

Trade union offices
Preceded by Clinton Golden	Vice President of the United Steelworkers of America; 1946–1955; With: Van Bittner (1946–1949)	Succeeded by Howard Hague
