= James Honeyben =

- Born: James Honeyben; 10 June 1986 (age 40) Swansea, Wales
- Height: 5 ft 11 in (180 cm)
- Weight: 14 st 2 lb (198 lb; 90 kg) (90 Kg)
- School: Kingscoat and then Thorpe House Prep School (Both Gerrards Cross), Royal Grammar School (High Wycombe)
- Notable relative: Ben Honeyben

Rugby union career
- Position: Scrum-half
- Current team: London Wasps
Senior career
Years	Team	Apps	(Points)
2002–	London Wasps	5	(0)
2006–2007	Henley Hawks (loan)	3	(0)
2007–2009	Blackheath (loan)	20	(30)

James Honeyben is a rugby union coach and former English professional rugby player, playing principally at scrum half.

He was a member of the Wasps Academy since 2002, then worked his way up within Wasps and was named as part of the senior squad starting in the 09/10 season. He was a familiar part of that squad despite injuries, including one to his groin in 2004/05. In that season he earned an U19 cap for England.

He played 5 times for Wasps in the Premiership. In the 2005/06 season, Honeyben made his Premiership debut against Sale in February as well as starting 13 out of 16 matches for the A team. Making his second start for the senior side, Honeyben ran out against Worcester in March, and gained a place on the pitch in the final game of the season against Gloucester.

The following season saw Honeyben as a member of the winning A League side with 10 appearances, but a shoulder injury held him back for a large part of the season. He recovered just in time for the start of the 07/08 season and was a part of the Middlesex 7s side. Unfortunately injury forced Honeyben off the pitch and he underwent surgery on his knee ligaments, but soon returned to training.

Honeyben had a successful 2008/9 season with the A side, although they couldn't claim the A League title for a third season. He then played for Exeter Chiefs.

He retired from playing to become a full-time coach with Wasps Academy.

As of 2017 he is head of rugby at RGS High Wycombe.
