= James Garfield (disambiguation) =

James A. Garfield (1831–1881) was the 20th president of the United States in 1881.

James Garfield may also refer to:

- James Rudolph Garfield (1865–1950), son of the President who served as United States Secretary of the Interior
- James Garfield (footballer) (1874–1949), English footballer
- James A. Garfield (ship)
