= James Glerum =

CIA officer

James Neal Glerum (died December 5, 2020) was among the second generation of Central Intelligence Agency Paramilitary Case Officers. He played an integral role in paramilitary operations in China, Indonesia, Vietnam, and Laos. Widely respected by both subordinates and superiors, he rose to become the Chief of the Special Activities Division and was a key figure in the division's post-Vietnam era professional development and modernization. Glerum continued to act in a consulting capacity following his retirement and was also involved in a successful program to collect and organize an extensive body of files and records documenting the over 60-year history of the Special Activities Division.
