= Senator James =

Senator James may refer to:

== Members of the United States Senate ==
- Charles Tillinghast James (1805–1862), U.S. Senator from Rhode Island from 1851 to 1857
- Ollie Murray James (1871–1918), U.S. Senator from Kentucky from 1913 to 1918

== United States state senate members ==
- Addison James (1849–1910), Kentucky State Senate
- David James (American politician) (1843–1921), Wisconsin State Senate
- Donzella James (born 1948), Georgia State Senate
- Francis James (congressman) (1799–1886), Pennsylvania State Senate
- G. Luz A. James (died 2006), Senate of the U.S. Virgin Islands
- Gerard Luz James (born 1953), Senate of the U.S. Virgin Islands
- John Hough James (1800–1881), Ohio State Senate
- John M. James (fl. 1860s), California State Senate
- Lorenzo James (1805–1888), Alabama State Senate
- Norman L. James (1840–1918), Wisconsin State Senate
- Rorer A. James (1859–1921), Virginia State Senate
- Sharpe James (1936–2025), New Jersey State Senate
- W. Frank James (1873–1945), Michigan State Senate
- William S. James (1914–1993), Maryland State Senate
