= James Monteith =

American author

James Monteith (1831–1890) was an American author of widely published geography textbooks in the nineteenth century. Monteith was born in Strabane, Ireland, immigrated to the United States as a child, and lived his whole life in New York City. Monteith taught for many years in New York's public school system, eventually becoming the headmaster of a Ward School 17 (later P.S. 18) at 211 West 47th St. Monteith began publishing textbooks on geography and history in the 1850s, initially collaborating with Francis McNally, who was a fellow New York public school teacher and mentor to Monteith until his death in 1855. Monteith's influences included Alexander K. Johnston, Arnold Guyot, Matthew Fontaine Maury, and Emma Hart Willard.

From the early 1850s to the 1880s, A.S. Barnes and Co. published many different versions of Monteith geography textbooks, which grew larger, more detailed, and more sophisticated over time. Over the course of his career, Monteith's style grew more unique and innovative, combining many different approaches to comparative geography and symbology.

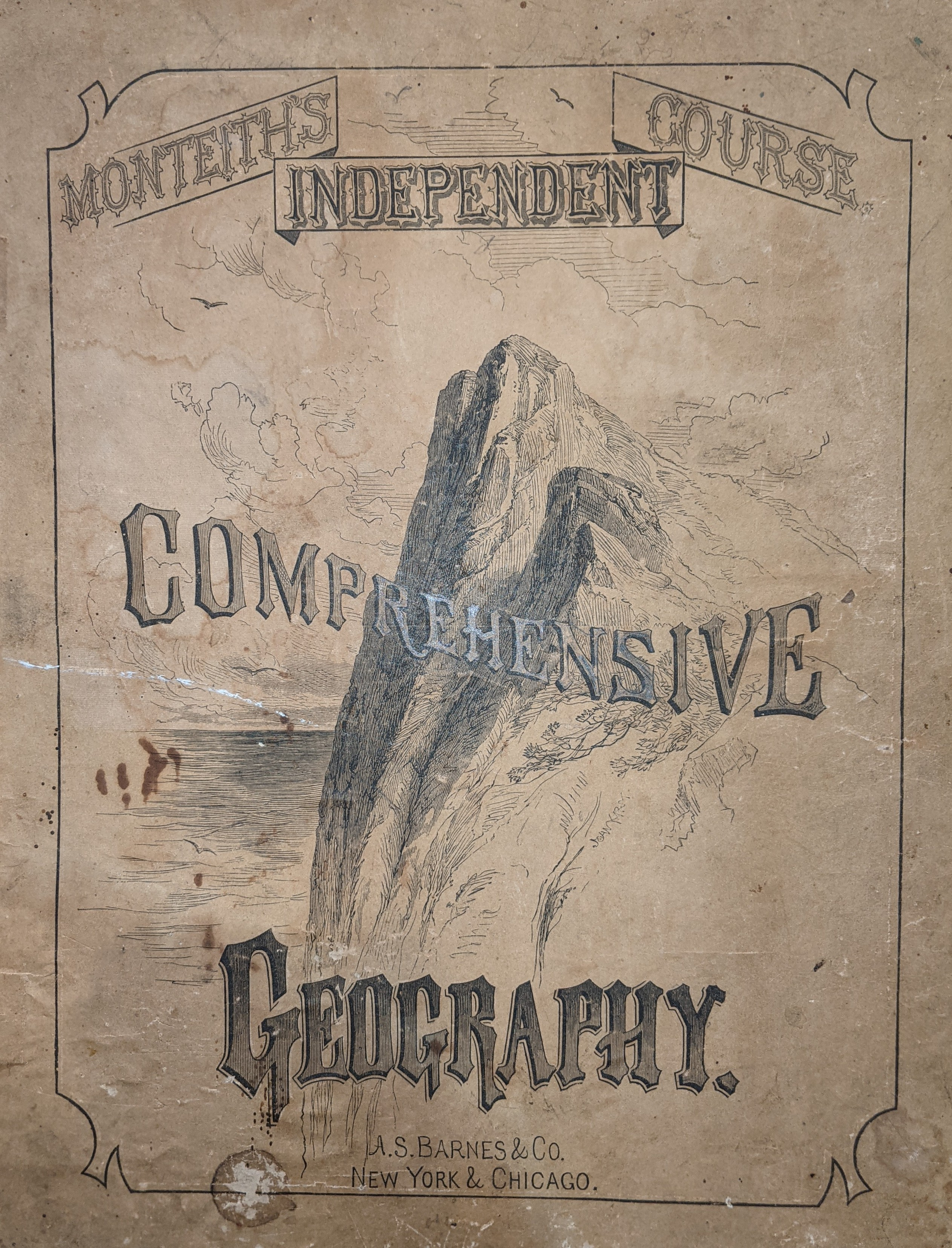
Cover of 1876 edition of Comprehensive Geography by James Monteith

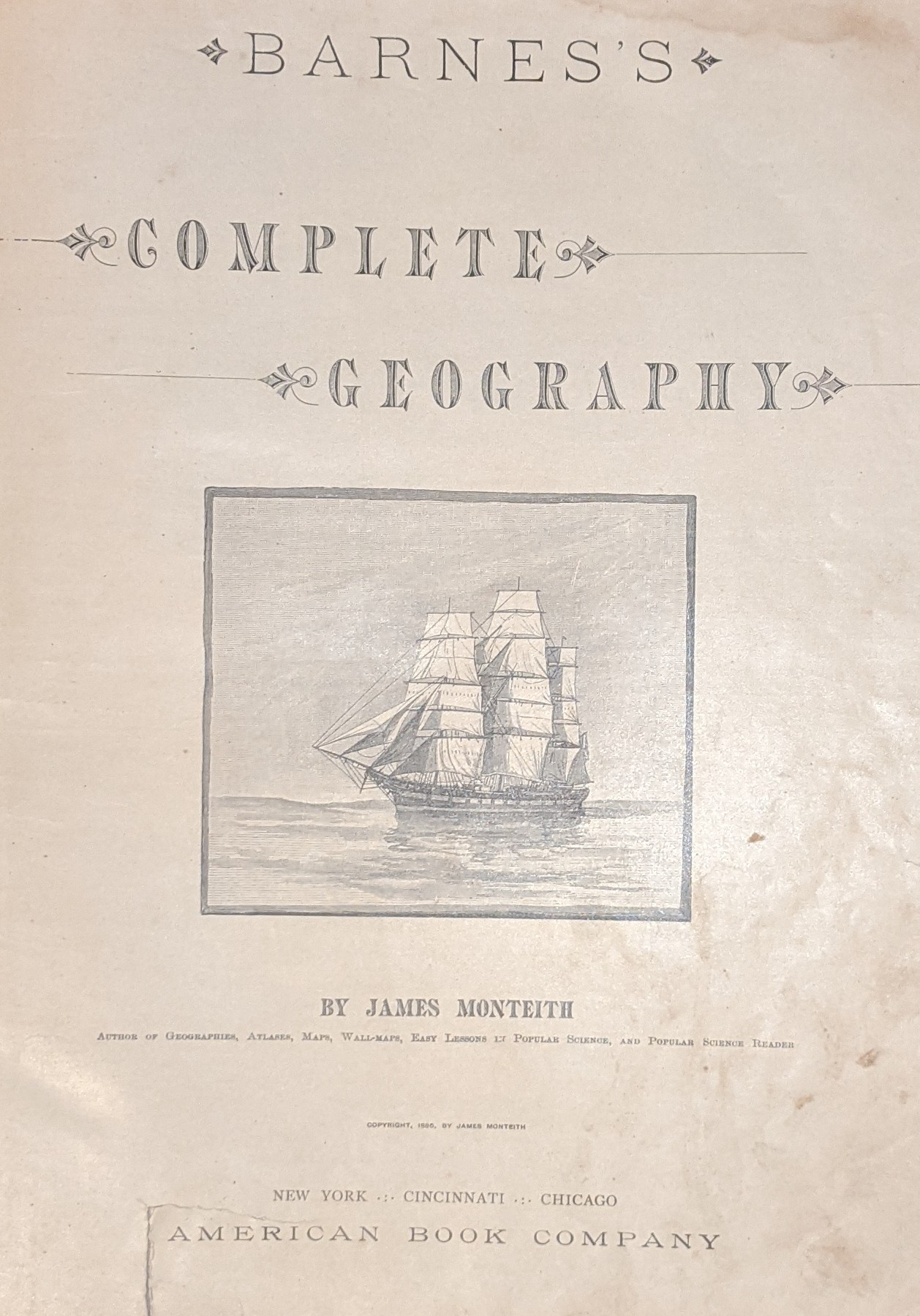
Title page from 1885 Edition of Barnes's Complete Geography by James Monteith

Monteith's textbooks remained in print for decades after his death, published by the American Book Company as Barnes's Complete Geography. Monteith probably produced more than one hundred different editions and versions of his geography textbooks in his lifetime: the Library of Congress alone holds 44 different listings for Monteith. Monteith was recommended for membership and elected as a Fellow of the American Geographical Society on November 18, 1879. In the 1880s, Monteith was involved in the development of the Washington Heights neighborhood in Manhattan, where he first purchased land in the 1860s, and the northward extension of the subway.

Monteith's obituary in the New York Times noted that "nearly every school boy and girl in the country is familiar with [his name] because of its being on the cover of the geographies." Monteith is buried in Philadelphia's Laurel Hill Cemetery alongside his first wife Emma Palmer Monteith and his second wife Ella Florence Brown.

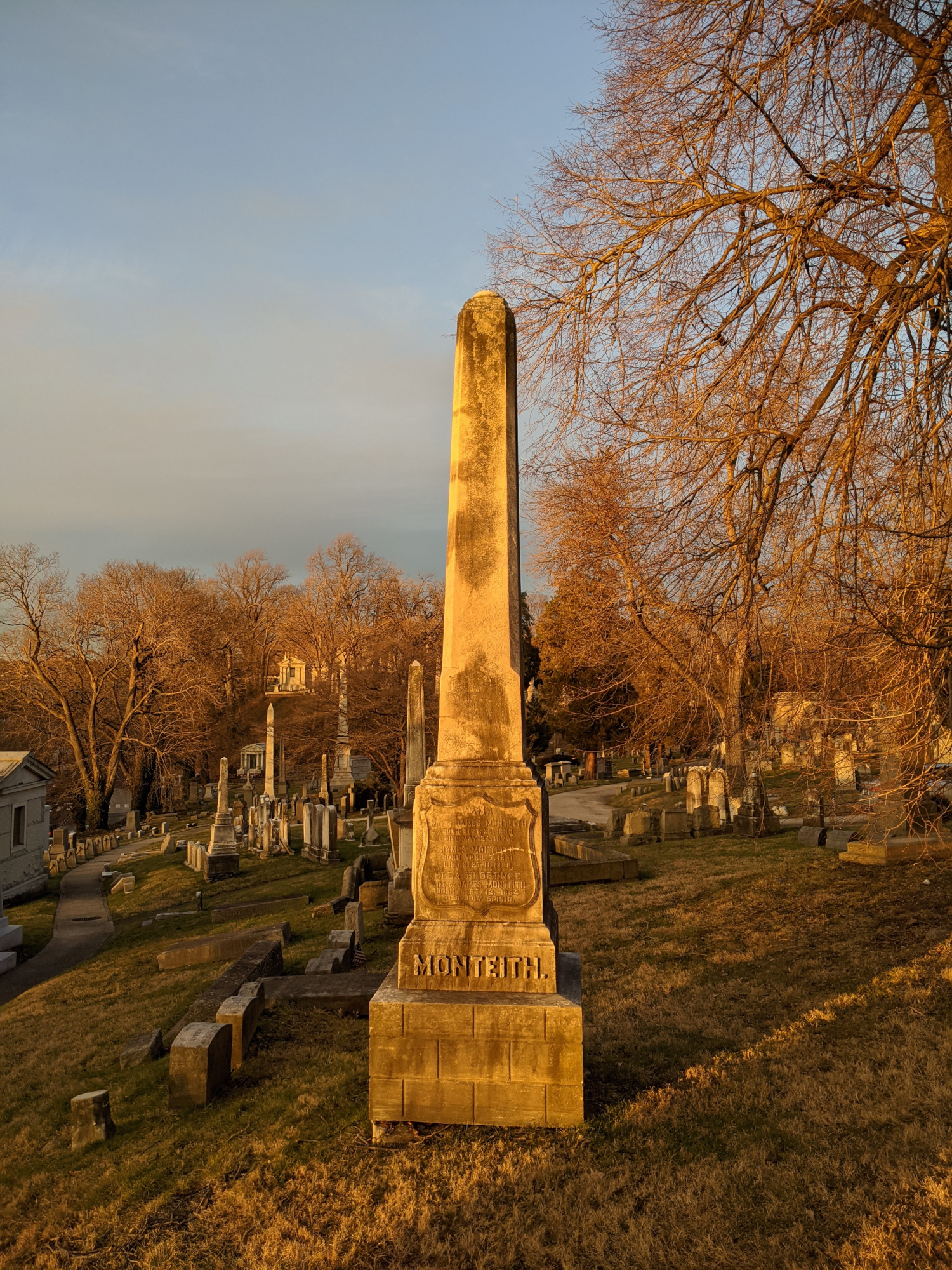
Grave of James Monteith at sunset in Philadelphia's Laurel Hill Cemetery
