= James Sorrie =

Scottish cricketer

Personal information
- Full name: James Webster Sorrie
- Born: 31 December 1885; Brechin, Angus, Scotland
- Died: 31 July 1955 (aged 69); Blackpool, Lancashire, England
- Batting: Right-handed
- Bowling: Unknown

Domestic team information
- Years: Team
- 1912–1924: Scotland

Career statistics
Competition	First-class
Matches	9
Runs scored	346
Batting average	19.22
100s/50s	–/2
Top score	61
Balls bowled	48
Wickets	2
Bowling average	11.50
5 wickets in innings	–
10 wickets in match	–
Best bowling	1/2
Catches/stumpings	4/–
- Source: Cricinfo, 12 July 2022

James Webster Sorrie (31 December 1885 – 31 July 1955) was a Scottish first-class cricketer and solicitor.

Sorrie was born in December 1885 at Brechin. He later studied law at the University of Edinburgh. A club cricketer for Brechin Cricket Club and later Carlton Cricket Club, he made his debut in first-class cricket for Scotland against the touring South Africans at Edinburgh in 1912. Sorrie was a regular feature in the Scottish side prior to the First World War, playing in seven matches; three came in the annual match against Ireland, while his other appearances came against Surrey, Oxford University, and the touring Australians. Following the war, he made a further two appearances in first-class cricket for Scotland, playing against Ireland in 1920 and Wales in 1924. In nine first-class matches, Sorrie scored 346 runs at an average of 19.22; he made two half centuries, with a highest score of 61 against Surrey at The Oval.

Outside of cricket, Sorrie worked as a solicitor for the firm Messrs Macandrew, Wright & Murray in Edinburgh. He died in England at Blackpool in July 1955.
