= James Holstein =

American sociologist

- Born: James Arthur Holstein
- Education: University of California, Berkeley; University of Michigan
- Scientific career
- Fields: Sociology
- Institutions: Marquette University
- Thesis: The Jury Decision-making Process: Interpretation and Deliberation (1981)

James A. Holstein is an American sociologist who is emeritus professor of sociology at Marquette University. He was the editor-in-chief of Social Problems from 2002 to 2005.
