= James F. Bandrowski =

American writer and speaker

James F. Bandrowski is an author, global keynote speaker, trainer, and consultant.

== Career ==
James F. Bandrowski earned his BE in chemical engineering from Villanova University, and went on to attain an MS in management science/industrial engineering from New Jersey Technical Institute, as well as an MBA from NYU. His career began with various research and engineering positions at Becton-Dickinson.

== Research and Books ==
As an R&D and manufacturing engineer at Becton-Dickinson in the early 1970s, he was awarded two patents and published an article in the Clinical Chemistry journal about advancements in using fluorometry in measuring blood chemistry. He began researching how other scientists and other types of innovators conceived new ideas, and created new products and business concepts. Paralleling this work, he also researched how top athletes achieved higher levels of performance. In 1978 he published three audio programs, one each on the mental side of tennis, golf, and skiing. The programs were sold by Psychology Today magazine, and the Athletic Achievement Corporation. The tennis program received the endorsement of World Team Tennis in San Francisco.

While researching and infusing creativity and imagination into strategic planning at DiGiorgio Corporation in the early 1980s, he wrote a monograph entitled Creative Planning Starts at the Top, published by the Presidents Association of the American Management Association in 1983. In 1985, The American Management Association commissioned him to write a second monograph, entitled Creative Planning throughout the Organization, and distributed it to all 85,000 of its members at that time.

=== Published books ===
- Creative Planning Throughout the Organization (Amacon Books, 1986) ISBN 0-8144-2319-1
- Corporate Imagination Plus (Free Press, 2000) ISBN 0-7432-0549-9
- Tennis: The Mental Game (Audio Cassette) ISBN 0-89811-131-5

== Works ==
- Bandrowski, James, and Hayden Curry narrating, Improving Your Tennis Game (#20200), Improving Your Golf Game (#20201), and Improving Your Golf Game (#20202), Psychology Today Cassettes, New York, 1978.
- Bandrowski, James, Creative Planning Starts at the Top, Presidents Association of the American Management Association, New York, monograph, 46 pages, 1983.
- Bandrowski, James, Creative Planning throughout the Organization, American Management Association, New York, monograph, 80 pages, 1985.
- Bandrowski, James F., Corporate Imagination Plus: Five Steps to Translating Innovative Strategies into Action, Free Press imprint of Simon & Schuster, New York, 1990, 313 pages.
- Bandrowski, Jim, Twelve Steps to Leadership Greatness, Vistage, San Diego, website, June 2009.
