= James S. Ettema =

American academic

- Education: University of Minnesota (BA, MA) University of Michigan (PhD)
- Occupation: Professor
- Employer: Northwestern University
- Known for: Research on the social organization and cultural impact of mass media and communication technologies
- Title: Professor Emeritus of Communication Studies

James S. Ettema is an American academic and professor emeritus of Communication Studies at Northwestern University. His research focuses on the social organization and cultural impact of mass media and new communication technologies. He is the author of several books.

== Career ==
Prior to his academic career, Ettema worked as a photographer and filmmaker. After completing his doctorate at the University of Michigan, he joined the faculty at Northwestern University.

At Northwestern, Ettema was a co-founder of the Media, Technology, and Society graduate program. He served for six years as the chair of the Department of Communication Studies and for ten years as the faculty coordinator of the department's professional graduate programs.

His research explores various facets of media, including investigative journalism, the digital divide, and the role of media in public discourse.

== Selected works ==
- Ettema, James S.; Glasser, Theodore L. (1998). Custodians of Conscience: Investigative Journalism and Public Virtue. New York City: Columbia University Press. ISBN 9780231106740. OCLC 911291998.
