= James Yap (disambiguation) =

James Yap (born 1982) is a Filipino professional basketball player.

James Yap may also refer to:

- Bimby Aquino Yap (James Aquino Yap Jr, born 2007), son of James Yap above, Filipino media personality
- James Yap (basketball, born 1933) (1933–2003), Taiwanese basketball player
