= James T. Prokopanko =

James T. Prokopanko is the former president and Chief Executive Officer of The Mosaic Company and has served in that capacity from January 1, 2007 to August, 2015. He was a director of the company since October 2004.

Prokopanko began his career at Mosaic in July 2006 as the executive vice president and Chief Operating Officer and he continued to serve in those positions until his appointment as president and CEO. Prior to working at Mosaic, he was employed at Cargill as corporate vice president from 2004 to 2006 and leader of Cargill's Ag Producer Services Platform from 1999 to 2006. He held many leadership positions at Cargill, such as the vice president of the North American crop inputs business in 1995.

Prokopanko serves on the board of directors for Mosaic, Canpotex, the Carlson School of Management at the University of Minnesota, The Fertilizer Institute and the International Plant Nutrition Institute.

== Compensation ==
While CEO of Mosaic in 2008, Prokopanko earned a total compensation of $5,987,059, which included a base salary of $808,333, a cash bonus of $1,912,500, stocks granted of $1,400,009, options granted of $1,561,866, and other compensation of $304,351.
