= Admiral James =

Admiral James may refer to:

- Jules James (1885–1957), U.S. Navy vice admiral
- Ralph K. James (1906–1994), U.S. Navy rear admiral
- William James (Royal Navy officer, born 1881) (died 1973), British Royal Navy admiral
