= James H. Purkins =

Arkansas legislator (c. 1814 – ?)

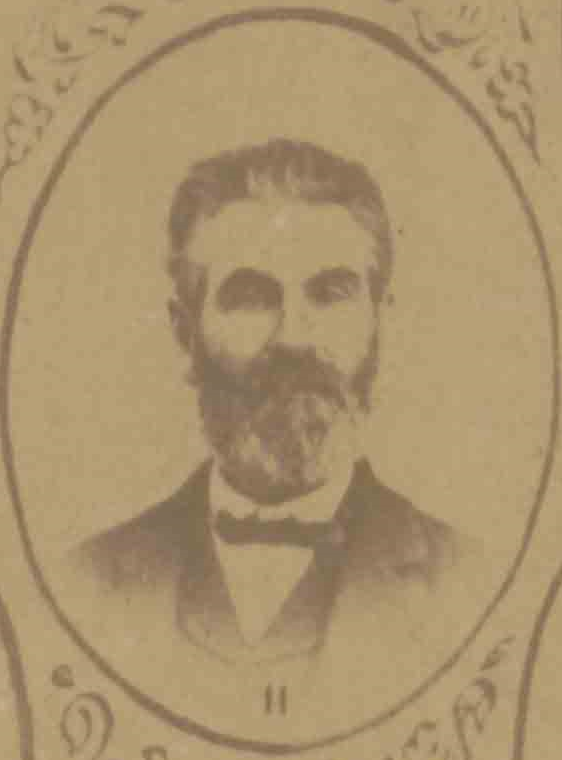
James H. Purkins circa 1866/7

James H. Purkins (c. 1814–?) was a state legislator in Arkansas. He served in the Arkansas House of Representatives from 1860–1863 and in the Arkansas Senate in 1866–1867.

He was born and raised in Essex County, Virginia. He came to Randolph County Ariansas in 1856. He served in the Confederate Army. He lived in Pocahontas, Arkansas in Randolph County, Arkansas.

He was editor and publisher of the Randolph Scalpel newspaper established in 1877. It affiliated with the Democratic Party. The paper ceased publication in 1882. J.A.C. Jackson was its editor and owner by 1880. Jackson worked afterwards at the Randolph Democrat.
