= James Dorsa =

Composer and harpsichordist

James Dorsa is a composer and harpsichordist who is currently a member of the faculty at California State University Northridge's Music Department. He is most recognized for his award-winning composition of "Jupiter's Moons".

== Debut Album ==
In 2016, Dorsa released his debut album, Io, which featured "Jupiter's Moons", "Martinique", "The Tea Party", and "Melting Away to Nothing". He won the Aliénor Harpsichord Composition Competition for "Jupiter's Moons".

== Educational Background ==
Dorsa has a Bachelor of Music in Composition from California State University, Northridge in 2001, Master of Music in Harpsichord Performance at Cal State Northridge in 2004, and a Doctor of Musical Arts at the University of Michigan, Ann Arbor in 2008.

== Sources ==
- Past Winners | Historical Keyboard Society of North America
- http://www.historicalkeyboardsociety.org/alienor/_docs/fall_2009.pdf
- http://www.mtacoc.org/newsletters/Newsletter-april2013web.pdf
- https://www.harpsichord.org.uk/sounding-board-archive/
- Sonia Lee | Pianist, Harpsichordist, Educator, Scholar
- http://www.music.umich.edu/research/stearns_collection/documents/Stearns19-1.pdf
- http://www.wherevent.com/detail/Mariana-Ramirez-CYAN-Ensemble
- https://www.linguitar.com/documents/SteveLin_Resume.pdf
- Historical Keyboard Society 2012 Joint Meeting & Festival
