= James Cheverud =

American biologist

James M. Cheverud is an American biologist, focusing on evolutionary quantitative genetics, morphology, and the genetics of complex traits and diseases in mammals. He is currently the Chair of the Biology Department at Loyola University Chicago. He spent several years as a professor at Washington University in St. Louis, where he is an Emeritus Professor in the departments of Anthropology and Anatomy & Neurobiology.

He was elected as a Fellow of the American Association for the Advancement of Science in 1988.
