= James Sodetz =

American biologist

James M. Sodetz is an American biologist, focusing in biochemistry; protein chemistry, protein engineering, and molecular biology; structure-function studies of proteins and enzymes of blood with emphasis on the human complement system, currently the Carolina Distinguished Professor / Biochemistry and Molecular Biology at University of South Carolina and an Elected Fellow of the American Association for the Advancement of Science.
