= James Polk (disambiguation) =

James K. Polk (1795–1849) was the 11th president of the United States from 1845 to 1849.

James Polk may also refer to:

== People ==
- James G. Polk (1896–1959), American Democratic congressman from Ohio
- James H. Polk (1911–1992), American four-star general who served as Commander-in-Chief of United States Army Europe 1967–1971
- James Polk (journalist) (1937–2021), American investigative reporter

== Other ==
- USS James K. Polk, United States Navy ballistic missile submarine launched 1965
- "James K. Polk" (song), 1990 release by American rock band They Might Be Giants

== See also ==
- Presidency of James K. Polk
- USS President Polk, U.S. Navy attack transport during World War II
