= James Kynvyn =

James Kynvyn (second half 16th-early 17th century) was an English craftsman, active between 1569 and 1610.

All that is known about him is that his workshop was located near St. Paul's Cathedral in London. He built high-quality mathematical instruments, notably graphometers, compasses, and quadrants.
