= James Mueller =

James Mueller may refer to:

- James Mueller (Ohio politician) (active 1971–1974), former member of the Ohio House of Representatives
- James Mueller (Indiana politician) (born 1982), mayor of South Bend, Indiana
- Jim Mueller (1943–2022), American sportscaster
