= James Lontayao =

American actor

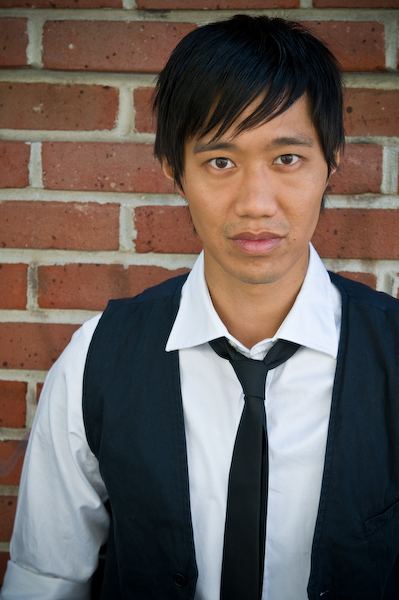
- Born: San Francisco, California
- Education: Junipero Serra High School
- Occupations: Actor, comedian, VJ
- Years active: 2000 - Present

James Lontayao is an American actor, comedian and former VJ for Myx TV.

== Early life and education ==
James Lontayao was born on October 13, in San Francisco, California to Filipino parents. He attended Junipero Serra High School in San Mateo and received his training from Foothill Theatre Conservatory. He had also received improv training from Bay Area Theatre Sports and Groundlings and currently trains at the Beverly Hills Playhouse.

== Career ==
Lontayao launched his acting career in 2000. He has worked with numerous Bay Area theatre companies, such as Asian American Theater Company and Bindlestiff Studios. His stage credits include Sleeper, Banyan and Walls.

In 2006, he had been selected as a VJ for Myx TV. From that point on, he had hosted a pop music oriented show on the TV channel, called Loveable until 2009. Lontayao starred in many short films, including Pleasant Company, Double Features, and Cereal Monogamy, an official selection at the 2007 VC Film Festival. In 2008, Lontayao took on the leading role of Thomas Yang in an offbeat romantic comedy feature film, The Red Door. Besides his TV and film career, Lontayao had also acted on an internet comedy that explores love, sex and relationship, called Lexationships with Marc and James. The success of the show has brought his character, James Spano, to college campuses, such as San Francisco State University, for live performances.

Additionally, he had played the role of Zach, on an online sci-fi mini-series, Eve, Beauty and the Blade. In the Summer of 2008, Lontayao had transferred out of Loveable and became a co-host of My Myx, reuniting with longtime onscreen friend and nemesis Olivia Speranza. Continuing his act on stage, Lontayao was featured in an Asian American modern-day comedy, Ching Chong Chinaman. Not shy from the spotlight, he can be found as a standup comic at different events and venues, such as the Asian Heritage Street Celebration, and many other fundraising benefits.

== Filmography ==
=== Films ===
Year	Title	Character/Role	Production
2007	Pleasant Company	Kirby	Union Entertainment
2008	Cereal Monogamy	Frank	Anton Delfino
2009	Dave and Liz	Dave	Thinking Stone
2009	Fruit Fly	Kenji	Ersatz / H.P. Mendoza
2009	The Red Door	Thomas Yang	EM West
2009	Double Features	Jet	
2014	Prophecy of Eve	Zach	Redcape Cinema
2014	Booze Boys and Brownies	Jameson	Shami Productions

=== Television ===
Year	Title	Character/Role	Production
2013	Maggie	Errol	
2015	L.A. Beer	Ryan	
2025	The Pitt	Fu Chen	Warner Bros. Television Studios
2026	Wonder Man	Antonio	Marvel Studios
