= James Trousdale =

- Born: December 16, 1736; Ulster Province, Ireland
- Died: December 24, 1818 (aged 82); Gallatin, Tennessee, U.S.
- Spouses: Elizabeth Ferguson (d. 1774); Elizabeth Dobbins (m. 1775)
- Children: 15, including William Trousdale
- Relatives: John and Elizabeth (Carraway) Trousdale (parents)
- Military career
- Allegiance: United States
- Branch: North Carolina Militia
- Service years: 1779–1781
- Rank: Captain
- Conflicts: Battle of Guilford Court House; Siege of Yorktown; Battle of Hillsborough
- Awards: Land grant (640 acres) for military service

James Trousdale (Dec 16, 1736 - Dec 24, 1818) was a captain in the American Revolution and father of William Trousdale, Governor of Tennessee. He was the son of John and Elizabeth (Carraway) Trousdale, who were born in Ulster Province, (now Northern) Ireland. With his second wife and children, he accompanied his parents from Pennsylvania to Orange County, North Carolina, settling on the Haw River. Trousdale's first recorded grant of land was by the State, 200 acres on the waters of Haw Creek, south of Hawfields, 3 Sep 1779.

== Military service ==
James Trousdale was a soldier in the Revolutionary War. He was a captain in the North Carolina Militia, 1780–1781. He commanded a company under General Francis Marion (The Swamp Fox) of North Carolina patriots; marched to Charleston, SC and built breastworks, etc., discharged on March 24, 1780, before the town surrendered. He was severely wounded, and until his death, carried a lightning scar made by a saber in the hands of one of Banastre Tarleton's men at the Battle of Guilford Court House, March 15, 1781. He was captured during the Battle of Hillsborough, 12 Sep 1781.; He and his company were with George Washington at the Siege of Yorktown for the surrender of Cornwallis, 19 Oct 1781.

In the Revolution, he began his active military service as a captain in 1779 and commanded at least three companies.

It is believed that Trousdale was an unnamed member of the ill-fated rebels at the Battle of Alamance on 16 May 1771. In February 1781, under Nathaniel Green, he was sent to oppose Cornwallis' army in the Battle of Guilford Court House. Following Green's withdrawal the North Carolina Council Extraordinary, in a questionable manner, sentenced "all those who had fled from Guilford to 12 months service as Continentals." On recovery from his wound Trousdale was probably given command of one of those reformed "Continental" units. Part of this service includes "six months guarding the jail at Hillsboro".

For his services during the American Revolution, Trousdale obtained from North Carolina, a grant for 640 acres of land situated in what was then Davidson County, now Sumner County, Tennessee. This land was paid for in scrip or certificates issued by North Carolina. Trousdale moved from North Carolina and settled on this tract of land in 1796. The land was then covered by a dense forest. Here he cleared the land and began to cultivate the soil. But, on the 6th of November, 1801, the Legislature of Tennessee appointed commissioners to select and purchase land upon which to lay out a town to be named Gallatin, which was to be the county seat of Sumner County. The commissioners selected the farm of Trousdale, and the town of Gallatin, TN now stands upon the old Trousdale farm. In 1802 the land for the county seat was purchased from Trousdale.

To honor the Trousdale military history, a monument was placed on the front lawn of Trousdale Place, a home built c. 1813 on the original property owned by Trousdale. The home is on the National List of Historic Places.

== Marriage and children ==
He married first Elizabeth Ferguson by whom he had five children: John, Alexander, Ann, Mary and Elizabeth. She died in 1774. He married his second wife, Elizabeth Dobbins, a member of a prominent family in North Carolina, in 1775. They had 10 children: James who married Malinda May; Robert who married first Sidney Wynham and second Abigail Robbins; Jonathan who married first Sally Josey, second Elizabeth Young; Catherine who married Matthew Cowan; Agnes; Sarah who married Matthew Neal; William Trousdale, who became the governor of Tennessee; Bryson who married first Susan Hicks and second Maria Smith; Jesse and Nancy. He died in 1818 in Gallatin, TN. In his will he left the majority of his estate to his wife Elizabeth and sons William and Bryson including 4 slaves: Bill, Penny, Lo and Delia. September 1818, copy on file at the Wisconsin Historical Society Library in Madison, WI. In a codicil, however, James is called "my beloved son" and was given the "House Bible".
