= James Kluegel =

American sociologist (born 1947)

- Born: May 13, 1947 (age 78)
- Education: University of Minnesota; University of Wisconsin
- Scientific career
- Fields: Sociology
- Institutions: University of Illinois at Urbana–Champaign
- Thesis: Job authority and social inequality (1975)

James Robert "Jim" Kluegel (born May 13, 1947) is an American sociologist known for his research on the perception of social inequality in the United States. He is particularly noted for directing a pioneering 1980 survey of Americans' beliefs about social stratification. He is an emeritus professor of sociology at the University of Illinois at Urbana–Champaign, where he taught for 27 years before retiring in 2006. He was the head of the Department of Sociology there from 1984 to 1996, and again as acting head from 2003 to 2004.
