= James Grazioplene =

US Army general and sex offender

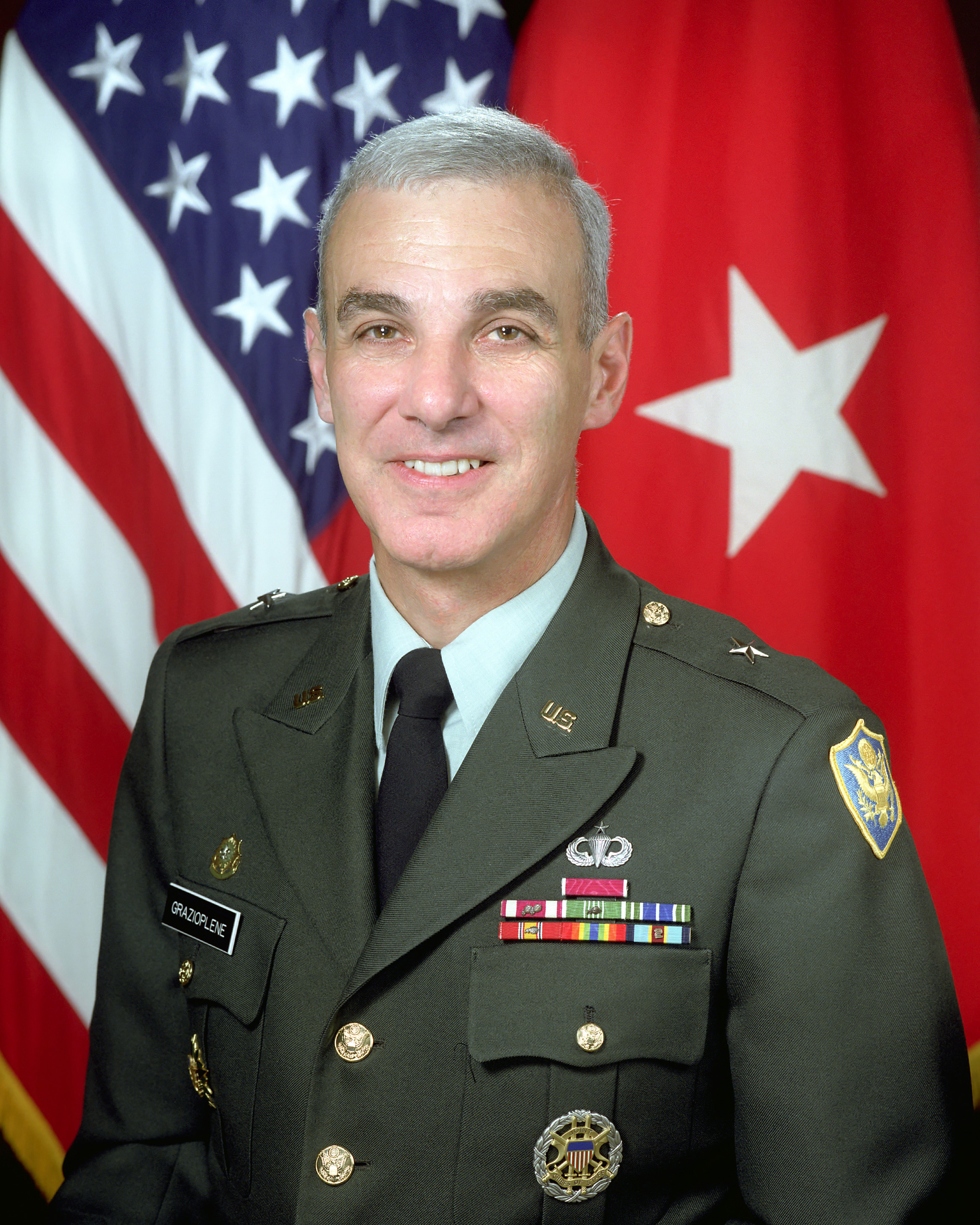
- Portrait of BG Grazioplene, 1997
- Born: James Joseph Grazioplene; July 19, 1949 (age 77); Batavia, New York, U.S.
- Military career
- Branch: United States Army
- Service years: 1972–2005
- Rank: Second lieutenant (Note: Grazioplene retired as a major general in 2005, but his rank was subsequently reduced in 2021, after his conviction for sexual battery and an investigation by the U.S. Department of Defense into the misconduct. Though the demotion was retroactive, it was entered into Grazioplene's official service record and reduces the amount he is entitled to collect in annual pension payouts.)
- Conflicts: Iraq War
- Awards: Legion of Merit; Meritorious Service Medal (3); Commendation Medal (2)

James Joseph Grazioplene (born July 19, 1949) is a former general officer in the United States Army and convicted sex offender. A graduate of the United States Military Academy, he was commissioned into the Army and rose to the rank of major general before retiring in January 2005. After an Army investigation that began in 2015 resulted in him being charged with incest and multiple counts of raping a minor, a decision by the United States Court of Appeals for the Armed Forces imposed a five-year statute of limitations on rape, and caused the case to be dismissed. In December 2018, he was charged by prosecutors in Prince William County, Virginia. The judge denied Grazioplene bail and ruled that he would remain in jail until he either affirmatively proved his innocence or pled guilty, at which point he would be transferred from jail to the Commonwealth prison system. After his conviction, Secretary of Defense Lloyd Austin changed Grazioplene's retired grade from major general to second lieutenant, determining that "second lieutenant was the highest grade in which he served on active duty satisfactorily,” according to a Pentagon spokesperson.

== Early life and education ==
Grazioplene was born in Batavia, New York, and attended Notre Dame High School.

In 1967, he received an appointment to the United States Military Academy from Congressman Barber Conable. While at West Point, Grazioplene designed the class of 1971's crest, which adorns the class rings of all the cadets who graduated that year.

== Military career ==
=== Assignments ===
In June 1971, Grazioplene was commissioned as a second lieutenant in the Armor Branch of the United States Army. He served until January 2005, retiring at the rank of major general.

In 1984, he served as the commander of 3d Squadron, Second Armored Cavalry Regiment, which at the time was headquartered in Amberg, Germany.

After his conviction, Secretary of Defense Lloyd Austin changed Grazioplene's retired grade from major general to second lieutenant, determining that "second lieutenant was the highest grade in which he served on active duty satisfactorily,” according to a Pentagon spokesperson.

=== Awards and decorations ===
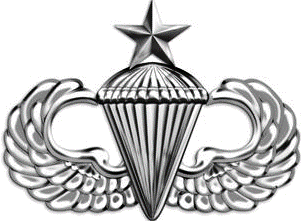
Senior Parachutist Badge
Legion of Merit
Meritorious Service Medal (with two bronze oak leaf clusters)
Army Commendation Medal (with one bronze oak leaf cluster)
Army Achievement Medal
National Defense Service Medal (with two bronze service stars)
Army Service Ribbon
Overseas Service Ribbon (with award numeral 2)

== Child molestation conviction ==
Grazioplene's daughter, Jennifer Elmore, first reported to Army officials in 2015 that her father had repeatedly molested and raped her throughout her childhood. The military launched an investigation and found enough evidence to move toward a trial in 2017. Grazioplene was indicted by a grand jury in Prince William County on three counts of rape, incest, and indecent liberties following a four-month investigation. Jennifer Elmore's mother and the retired major general's wife, Ann Marie Grazioplene's letters to a relative detailing how she had found her husband preparing to sexually molest her daughter were used by the prosecution as evidence of the crimes. Two weeks before the trial was set to begin a top military appeals court found a five-year statute of limitations existed for sexual assault in the military if the assault occurred before 2006. The Supreme Court has accepted a Justice Department appeal to review that decision. On July 8, 2020, Grazioplene pleaded guilty to one charge of aggravated sexual battery in exchange for 20 years of probation. As part of the plea deal, he was also released from prison after being incarcerated for 18 months. James and Ann Marie Grazioplene remain married.

In June 2021, under the provisions allowed for in 10 U.S. Code § 1370, Secretary of Defense Lloyd Austin determined that the last rank Grazioplene satisfactorily served in was second lieutenant. He then demoted Grazioplene to that rank, reducing his retirement pay.
