= James Plummer =

James Plummer may refer to:

- James Henry Plummer (1848–1932), Canadian financier
- James Pratt Plummer, grandson of James W. Parker whose family were kidnapped by Native Americans
- James W. Plummer (1920–2013), American director of the National Reconnaissance Office
- James Ransom Plummer, mayor of Columbia, Tennessee
- Jim Plummer, Canadian-born electrical engineer
