= James Lutgen =

American criminal

James Lutgen of East Dubuque, Illinois strangled his wife in December 1984 at their home in Menominee, Illinois in front of their two daughters. They were 10 and 12 years old at the time. She had filed for divorce and an emergency order of protection, but was killed before receiving a response. The Lutgens got into a fight after Ms. Lutgen refused to allow the children to go out shopping with their father. James Lutgen testified that his wife had attempted to strangle him, and that he had then choked her until she died. Lutgen pleaded guilty to voluntary manslaughter and received a 4-year prison sentence, of which he served 13 months.

Lutgen was released in 1986 and allowed to retain custody of his children. A circuit court judge in Jo Daviess County ruled that Lurgen was "a fit and proper person to have the care and control of his minor children". The aunt and uncle of the two young girls appealed the judicial order that returned custody of the children to their father, but a three panel appeals court said there was no precedent or law to overturn the lower court's decision:

Neither our Legislature nor our case law in Illinois has seen fit to set forth a rule that the killing of one parent by the other in the presence of the children, no matter what the circumstances, is sufficient to deprive that parent of his or her children on the basis of unfitness.

A witness testified that she had seen the children and Ms. Lutgen with injuries, including a black eye, but had not personally seen how the children received the injuries. Although a state statute mandated that the court consider domestic violence as a factor to determine the best interests of the child, the court said that the statute did not require that domestic violence be given more weight than any other factor. The appellate court wrote that "a single criminal conviction, without more, will not support a finding of unfitness based upon depravity", noting that Lutgen had an otherwise "unblemished record".
