= James Davant =

James W. Davant (December 1, 1915 – April 17, 2009) was chief executive at Paine Webber during its expansion from a small broker to a large nationwide operation. After a 35-year career in the securities industry with the same firm Davant stepped down from his position on May 29, 1980.
