= Fernande Glyn =

Australian actor

- Born: Fernande Stader; 3 April 1927; Sydney, Australia
- Died: 3 August 2011 (aged 84)
- Occupation: Actor
- Spouses: John Unicomb (divorced); Willy Stader ( – 2011 her death)
- Children: David Unicomb; Michael Unicomb
- Relatives: Neva Carr Glyn (aunt); Nick Tate (nephew)

Fernande Glyn (3 April 1927 – 3 August 2011) was an Australian television and stage actor. She was well-known in the 1960s for her television and theatre work, most notably for her starring role as Eve Halliday on Hunter.

== Early life ==
Glyn's parents were Ferdinand Glynn (1865–1930), a labour organiser and salesman, and Minnie Vos (1896–1937) a saleswoman. An orphan from the age of ten, Glyn attended the Santa Maria Convent School in Lawson, New South Wales.

Glyn's unusual first name was a feminine version of her father, Ferdinand's, name. She was sometimes credited with the last name 'Glynn' rather than 'Glyn', as per the original version of her father's last name.

She was the niece of the celebrated actor Neva Carr Glyn (and therefore also related to another well-regarded actor, Neva Carr Glyn's son Nick Tate).

== Career ==
=== Career in Britain ===
Glyn worked in Britain between 1952 and 1958, appearing on both BBC and ITV television programs. The first record of Glyn's stage work is in Wales, where she appeared in a 1952 production of A Christmas Carol in Bridgend. She also appeared in the Colwyn Bay Repertory Theatre's production of Ragtime by David Read in 1956. Soon afterwards she acted (as ‘mother’) alongside John Unicomb (‘father') in Dennis Driscoll's Off the Deep End, also for the Colwyn Bay Repertory Theatre.

Glyn's last known work in Britain was in two television films from 1957 – The Bloodless Arena and The Kentish Robin.

=== Career in Australia ===
In 1958, Glyn returned to Australia and in mid-1959 was appearing with Unicomb as part of J. C. Williamson's Shakespeare Company in a Melbourne production of The Merchant of Venice. Glyn was noted by the The Age's theatre critic as a 'seductive Jessica'. Glyn next played Regan in King Lear, delivering a performance The Sydney Morning Herald's critic described as 'firm and confident but unsuccessful in suggesting depths of character behind all the superficial hatefulness'.

The following year, Glyn and Unicomb were appearing in a regular radio comedy, Mr. and Mrs., part of a feature known as Omnibus on Sydney radio station 2GB. The series, described as 'a sophisticated domestic comedy', was written by James Carhartt.

In June 1961 Glyn appeared in an Australian television drama for the first time, in the role of Bessie in The Sergeant from Burralee. She appeared in an episode of Whiplash soon afterwards. In November of the same year, she appeared alongside Barry Creyton in an adaptation of the novel East Lynne at the Neutral Bay Music Hall.

In late 1962, both Glyn and Unicomb had lead roles together, alongside David Hutcheson and Martine Messager in another J. C. Williamson’s production, a play adapted from Marcel Achard's L'Idiote, called A Shot in the Dark, a French comedy which ran for nearly four months in Sydney and Melbourne.

In late 1964 Glyn and Unicomb were again cast together in a satire produced by John Faassen, How the West Was Lost, which was written by, and starred, Glyn's former co-star Barry Creyton. 1964 also saw Glyn act alongside Tony Ward, who would later be her Hunter co-star, as well as her aunt Neva Carr Glyn, in Rape of the Belt, a television play for the ABC.

In early 1965, Glyn became a 'weather girl' for ATN7, working two nights a week in the role. During this time she and Unicomb were guest stars together on The Mavis Bramston Show. In June, she also appeared in a play written and directed by Bob Herbert, Campari Rocks.

Her next play, The Deadly Game, was an adaptation by James Yaffe of Friedrich Dürrenmatt's novel and subsequent play A Dangerous Game. It ran at the Independent Theatre, North Sydney in January and February 1966. A television play followed, Marcel Pagnol's Topaze, in which Glyn played Suzy. Critic Harry Robinson praised Glyn, writing that 'her quirky lips and eyes' reflected 'the dry humour of the play most accurately'.

In 1966 she also appeared in an Adelaide production of Noël Coward's Private Lives.

=== Hunter ===
Glyn's relationship with Crawford Productions began with a role in an episode of Consider Your Verdict in 1963, followed by an episode of Homicide. She was then contracted to play the character of Eve Halliday in Hunter.

The pilot for Hunter was made in secret in 1966 as Tony Ward was under contract to another channel; it was announced in The Age's 'TV-Radio Guide' in early 1967 that Ward would star with Glyn as 'a pretty secretary'. This characterisation was revised the following week when she was instead described in the same paper as 'an experienced agent' who 'takes no-one at face value'.

The character of Eve Halliday was far from a passive assistant but instead involved extensively in the espionage storylines. Glyn told the The Australian Women's Weekly's Leonie Newberry that Halliday was 'sophisticated, warm yet strong, dedicated to what she does and capable of doing all sorts of things.'

There was, however, very limited backstory for the character – aside from that she was a widow and that her husband, Gary, had been in the CIA and killed at the age of 34. Ward's character says in episode 7 of the series ("The Prometheus File Part 3") "She doesn't talk much about it." Glyn did not appear in the second series of Hunter.

By 1980, Glyn was described in an article on the NSW National Youth Film Festival as 'the current Warringah Council arts officer and former actress'.

== Personal life ==
Glyn met actor John Unicomb met when they were playing lead roles in rival Shakespearian productions in Sydney. A year later, the couple relocated to London, where they were married in their first few weeks there. Wedding guests included Leo McKern and Ralph Peterson.

The couple remained in the UK for six years, spending the first two years in London, working in stage, radio, and television. They welcomed son Michael around the end of 1953, after which time, they bought a caravan and toured England, Wales, and Scotland with theatrical groups.

Glyn and Unicomb returned to Australia in August 1958, where their second son David was born about six years after Michael. By the end of the 1960s, the couple had divorced.

Son David told journalist Stephen Nicholls that 'With a walking frame in tow in the later years, she would frequently invite strangers who looked in need back to the apartment for a cup of tea or a meal, never concerned for her safety or her possessions.' Late in life, she suffered from dementia and 'a debilitating muscular disease.'

When she died in 2012, Glyn was survived by a second husband, entrepreneur Willy Stader. Stader lived at their Cremorne apartment another ten years after Glyn's death, dying at the age of 102.

== Television ==
Year	Title	Role	Type
1957	The Bloodless Arena	Stewardess	TV film
1957	The Kentish Robin	Actor	TV film
1961	The Sergeant from Burralee	Bessie Constantine	TV film
1961	Whiplash	Margaret	1 episode
1962	Consider your Verdict	Miss Broderick	1 episode
1964	Rape of the Belt	Antiope, the Amazonian Queen	TV film
1965	Homicide	Gwen Davis	1 episode
1966	Topaze	Suzy	TV film
1967–1968	Hunter	Eve Halliday	26 episodes
1968	Skippy the Bush Kangaroo	Miss Dempster	1 episode
1969	Riptide	Barmaid	1 episode

== Theatre ==
Year	Title	Role	Type	Ref.
1952	Twelfth Night	Olivia	Metropolitan Theatre, Sydney	
1952	A Christmas Carol		Bridgend, Wales	
1956	Ragtime		Colwyn Bay Repertory Theatre, Wales	
	Off the Deep End	Mother	Colwyn Bay Repertory Theatre, Wales	
1959	The Merchant of Venice	Jessica	Theatre Royal, Adelaide, His Majesty's Theatre, Perth, Theatre Royal Sydney with J. C. Williamson's	
1959	King Lear	Regan	Theatre Royal, Adelaide, His Majesty's Theatre, Perth, Theatre Royal Sydney with J. C. Williamson's	
1959	The Winter’s Tale	Emilia	Theatre Royal, Adelaide, His Majesty's Theatre, Perth, Theatre Royal Sydney with J. C. Williamson's	
1959	A Midsummer Night's Dream		Theatre Royal, Adelaide	
1962	L'Idiote\A Shot in the Dark		Sydney & Melbourne with J. C. Williamson	
1964	How the West Was Lost		Neutral Bay Music Hall, Sydney	
1965	Private Lives		Theatre 62, Adelaide with South Australian Theatre Company / AETT	
1966	The Deadly Game		Independent Theatre, Sydney	
