= Nigel Lovell =

Australian stage, radio and TV actor (1916–2001)

- Born: Nigel Tasman Lovell; 27 January 1916; Sydney, New South Wales, Australia
- Died: 13 December 2001 (aged 85)
- Education: Sydney University (1938)
- Occupations: Actor, producer, director
- Years active: 1935–1982
- Spouse: Patricia Lovell
- Children: 2 (including Jenny Lovell)
- Family: Geoff Lovell (nephew)

Nigel Tasman Lovell (27 January 1916 – 13 December 2001) was an Australian stage, radio, film and television actor, and producer of opera and both stage and radio drama.

== Early life ==
Lovell was born in Sydney, the son of H(enry) Tasman Lovell, Professor of Psychology and Dean of the Faculty of Arts, Sydney University, living at Honda Road, Neutral Bay. He was educated at 'Shore' (Sydney Church of England Grammar School) and studied law at Sydney University, graduating with a BA in 1938, and was an active member of the Sydney University Dramatic Society (SUDS), under director May Hollinworth. While with SUDS, he was spotted by the director of drama for the Australian Broadcasting Commission, Frank Clewlow, who gave him small roles in several radio plays.

== Career ==
In 1950, Lovell joined Sydney's Metropolitan Theatre under Hollinworth, and when she fell ill he took over production.

In 1951, Lovell won a Commonwealth Jubilee Arts Scholarship in Drama, a travelling scholarship awarded by the British Council to study production in England.

He continued acting for the ABC under producers Eric John and Frank Zeppel in the last decade of Australian radio drama, and in several ABC-TV historical plays.

In 1959, Lovell appeared as the main protagonist in the convict-themed Pardon Miss Westcott, which was the first Australian musical written specially for live television. That same year, he had a small role in feature film The Restless and the Damned.

Lovell was also a regular in Crawford Productions for commercial TV; notably as the avuncular spy chief on late 1960s series Hunter. During the 1970–1972 seasons of Crawfords' long-running Melbourne police series Homicide, he served as a line producer and television dialogue director, before it moved completely into being a fully-filmed program. In 1972 he returned to Sydney, joining the staff of ABC Radio as a producer of education programs.

== Personal life ==
Lovell was a brother of Dr. Bruce Tasman Lovell (1910 – 19 September 1986) and Guy Tasman Lovell (15 August 1919 – ). Former cricketer Geoff Lovell is a nephew.

Lovell married Sue Dalton in 1941 and had a daughter Catherine Lovell on 1 January 1947. His wife died of a heart condition later that year.

He married again, to Patricia Anna Parr in 1956, having met through work with Sydney's Metropolitan Theatre. They had two children – Simon Lovell, a helicopter pilot, and Jenny Lovell, an actor known for her role in the television series Prisoner. Patricia Lovell had a significant career in radio and film both before and after their divorce.

== Filmography ==
=== Film ===
Year	Title	Role	Type	Ref.
1948	The Valley is Ours	Narrator	Short film	
1948	The Bushman Goes Home	Commentator	Short film	
1949	Eureka Stockade	Captain Wise	Feature film	
1951	Wherever She Goes	Will Joyce (father of Eileen Joyce)	Feature film	
1957	The Shiralee	O’Hara (uncredited)	Feature film	
1957	Papua and New Guinea	Commentator	Short film	
1959	The Dispossessed (aka L'ambitieuse or The Restless and the Damned)	André Rancourt	Feature film	
1964	Under Stress	Narrator	Short film	
1964	Music in the Making	Commentator	Short film	
1965	Army Apprentices	Narrator	Short film	
1970	Ned Kelly	Captain Standish	Feature film	
1976	Let the Balloon Go	The Parson	Feature film	

=== Television ===
Year	Title	Role	Type	Ref.
1957	A Fourth for Bridge	Air Force Type	TV movie	
1959	One Bright Day	Arthur Mitchell	TV movie	
1959	The Bodgie	Robert Manning MP	TV movie	
1959	Pardon Miss Westcott	Colonel Patterson	Episode of Shell Presents	
1960	Stormy Petrel	Major General George Johnston	8 episodes	
1960	The Grey Nurse Said Nothing	Reverend Light	Episode of The General Motors Hour	
1961	The Sergeant from Burralee	Defence Counsel	TV movie	
1961	Whiplash	Josie / Edwin Regnor / Wilfred Swan	3 episodes	
1962	Off Centre	Joe Hunter	TV movie	
1962	Consider Your Verdict	Harold Rees	2 episodes	
1962	The Patriots	Dr Robert Wardell	Miniseries, 10 episodes	
1962	Jonah		1 episode	
1963	Smugglers Beware		Miniseries	
1963	The Hungry Ones	Surgeon John White	9 episodes	
1963	Time Out	Louis de Rougemont	1 episode	
1963	The Land That Waited	Narrator	TV movie	
1964	The Stranger	Group Captain Ponsonby	Miniseries, 1 episode	
1964	Tribunal	Bartolomeo Vanzetti	1 episode	
1964	A Sound of Trumpets	Geoff	TV movie	
1965	The Big Killing	Charles Barcher	TV movie	
1965	Adventure Unlimited		1 episode	
1965–1973	Homicide	John Simpson / Supt. Tilley / Refinery Security Officer / Stranger / Senator Russell Watson / Thomas Burke / Graham Boyce / Prosecuting Counsel	8 episodes	
1966	Point of Departure	Clark	TV movie	
1966	The Nice Widow at Quinto		Episode of Australian Playhouse	
1967	Nice 'n' Juicy	Mackay	1 episode	
1967	Divorce Court		210 episodes	
1967–1969	Hunter	Charles Blake	65 episodes	
1968	The Battlers	Magistrate	1 episode	
1968	Skippy the Bush Kangaroo	Dr Martin	1 episode	
1969	Riptide	Inspector	1 episode	
1969; 1970	Delta	Ronnie / Major Brunning	2 episodes	
1969–1971	Division 4	Judge / Ken Frost / Carl Glass on / Henry Morgan / Will Smyth	5 episodes	
1970	Woobinda, Animal Doctor		1 episode	
1970	The Rovers	The Bank Manager / Dr Henry Micklejohn	2 episodes	
1970	Strange Holiday		TV movie	
1972	The Lady and the Law		TV movie	
1972	The Spoiler	Richards		
1972–1973	Over There	Captain Balfour	5 episodes	
1973	Matlock Police	Ted Jackson	1 episode	
1973	Seven Little Australians	The Doctor	Miniseries, 1 episode	
1974	Behind the Legend	John Flynn	1 episode	
1975	Last Rites	Beecham	TV movie	
1976	Alvin Purple	Dad	1 episode	
1977	Born to Run (aka Harness Fever)	Cantrell	TV movie	
1978	Case for the Defence	The Judge	1 episode	
1982	A Country Practice	Bluey Ashdown	2 episodes	

=== As producer ===
Year	Title	Role	Type	Ref.
1970–1972	Homicide	Producer	18 episodes	

== Theatre ==
=== As actor ===
Year	Title	Role	Type	Ref.
1935	As You Like It	Adam	Savoy Theatre, Sydney with SUDS	
1936	Don Juan	Lord Frantingham (and the statue)	SUDS	
1938	Hotel Universe		SUDS	
1938	Tuttifäntchen	The Puppet Master	Collegium Musicum Sydney	
1938	Death Takes a Holiday	Corrado	University of Sydney with SUDS	
1938	The Merchant of Venice	Bassanio	University of Sydney with SUDS	
1938	Lucrece	Tarquin	University of Sydney with SUDS	
1939	Laughter in Court	Edward Cruickshank	University of Sydney with SUDS	
1939	By Wire	Detective Inspector Denwood	University of Sydney with SUDS	
1939	Hotel Universe		Lyceum Club, Sydney	
1940	The School for Scandal		University of Sydney with SUDS	
1940	French Without Tears		Minerva Theatre, Sydney	
1941	Mr Smart Guy	Rex Albion	Minerva Theatre, Sydney	
1950	Raymond, Lord of Milan	Raymond Della Torre	Metropolitan Theatre, Sydney	
1950	A Midsummer Night's Dream	Oberon	Metropolitan Theatre, Sydney	
1950	The Rivals	Sir Anthony	Metropolitan Theatre, Sydney	
1957	The Big Knife	Clifford Odets	Independent Theatre, Sydney	
1965	Two Plays in Rehearsal		Independent Theatre, Sydney	
1965	My Life with an Interval for Asprin		Independent Theatre, Sydney	
1965	The Business of Good Government		Assembly Hall, Sydney with Q Theatre	
1966	A Walk Among the Wheeneys		AMP Theatrette, Sydney with Q Theatre	
1966	A Far Country		Independent Theatre, Sydney	

=== As director/producer ===
Year	Title	Role	Type	Ref.
1950	Raymond, Lord of Milan	Director	Metropolitan Theatre, Sydney	
1950	A Midsummer Night’s Dream	Director	Metropolitan Theatre, Sydney	
1950	The Rivals	Director	Metropolitan Theatre, Sydney	
1951	A Masked Ball	Director	Princess Theatre, Melbourne with NSW Opera / National Opera Company	
1953	The Flying Dutchman			
1954	Il trovatore	Director	Victoria Theatre, Newcastle, Empire Theatre for the National Opera of Australia	
1954	Faust	Producer	Empire Theatre, Sydney	
1955	Winter Journey	Producer	Independent Theatre, Sydney	
1956	Sāvitri & Prima Donna	Producer	University of Sydney	
1957	The Big Knife	Director	Independent Theatre, Sydney	
1958	Curly on the Rack	Director	Elizabethan Theatre, Sydney	
1964	Hullabaloo Belay	Director	St James Playhouse, Sydney	
1965	You Can't Take it with You	Producer	Independent Theatre, Sydney	
1970	95 Men and a Nannygoat	Director	UNSW Old Tote Parade Theatre, Sydney	

== Radio ==
=== As actor ===
Year	Title	Role	Notes	Ref.
1938	The Wild Ass's Skin		Honoré de Balzac play	
1939	Hands Across the Table		Play on Lux Radio Theatre	
1939	Those We Love		Serial on 2CH	
1939	Magnificent Obsession		Play on Lux Radio Theatre	
1940	Smilin' Thru		Serial on 2KY	
1940	Four Daughters		Harry Dearth's Radio Theatre	
1940s	Judge Marshall's Family	Pan Marshall	Serial on 2UW, 2GB	
1940s	Strange Destiny		Serial on 2UW	
1940s–1950s	Drama of Medicine		Serial on 2UW	
1944–1949	The Lawsons		Serial on ABC Radio	
1946	Big Sister	Frank Hill	Serial on 2UW	
1946–1947	Crossroads of Life	Larry Halstead	Serial on 2KO, 2UW	
1946–1948	Danger Unlimited	Jeffery Blackburn	Serial on 2UE, 3UZ, 4BC, including episode: "The Adventure of the Queen's Bracelet"	
1948	Perfect Strangers		Clemence Dane play	
1949	A Bill of Divorcement		Clemence Dane play	
1952	The General Motors Hour		Serial on 2GB	
1953	The Cure for Love		Walter Greenwood play	
1953	The Quiet Stranger	Red Williams	Serial	
1954–	Tarzan		Serial on 2GB	
1955	Yellow Jack	Major Reed	Play on 2BL-NC-CN, 4QR	
1957	The Explorers	King	Play on ABC Radio	
1960	Passage of the Tangmar	Dirk Kendall	Serial	
1961	Cattleman	Ben	Serial on 2GB, 2UE, 2AD, 4LM	
1965	Concord of Sweet Sounds	Gerhmann	BBC	
	Beyond the Rainbow	Storm Hannaford	Serial	
1960s	No Rainbow in the Sky	Storm Hannaford	Serial	
	Big City		Serial	
	Blue Hills		Serial on ABC Radio	
	Count Down	Kevin Miles	Serial	
	Nyal Radio Playhouse		Serial	

=== As director/producer ===
Year	Title	Role	Notes	Ref.
1954–	Tarzan	Producer	2GB	
1959–	Woman in the Mirror	Producer	2UW, 5AD	
1963–	North from Thursday	Producer		
	Night Must Fall	Producer	Macquarie Theatre on 2GB	
1970s	A Place in the Sun	Director	4BU	
