= Crime Passionel =

- Based on: play by Jean-Paul Sartre
- Directed by: Royston Morley
- Country of origin: Australia
- Original language: English

Production
- Running time: 90 minutes
- Production company: ABC

Original release
- Network: ABC
- Release: 11 November 1959 (Sydney, live)
- Release: 17 November 1959 (Brisbane)
- Release: 10 February 1960 (Melbourne)

Crime Passionel is a 1959 Australian television play. It was based on a play by Jean-Paul Sartre and was directed by Royston Morley.

The play had been broadcast that year by the BBC.

It was broadcast live in Sydney on 11 November 1959. A recording was made of this and shown in Brisbane on 17 November 1959 and Melbourne on 10 February 1960. It went for 90 minutes.

Australian TV drama was relatively rare at the time.

== Plot ==
At the end of World War Two, in the mythical European country of Illythia, the German armies are retreating from the Russians. Hugo, a young intellectual who wants to be revolutionary hero, sets about assassinating Hoederer, leader of the local communist party. Hugo is Hoederer's secretary. Hugo has a wife Jessica, and a fellow party member, Olga.

== Cast ==
- Brian James as Hoederer
- William Job as Hugo
- Jacqueline Kott as Olga
- John Fegan as Charles
- Tony Arpino as Franz
- Peter Williams as Louis
- James Elliott as Ivan
- Rosemary Webster as Hugo's wife
- Don Crosby as Georges
- Julian Flett as Prince Paul
- Nat Levison as Slick
- Richard Parry as Karsky
- Bill Waters as Leon

== Production ==
Brian James was flown in from Melbourne to play the lead.

== Reception ==
The Sydney Morning Herald TV reviewer wrote that the play was "a little slow in movement, because of the sheer weight of its talk... [but] was given an absorbing live performance... the cast was uncommonly strong."

== See also ==
- List of live television plays broadcast on Australian Broadcasting Corporation (1950s)
