= The Hungry Ones =

1963 Australian television series

- Advertisement from The Age, 20 July 1963
- Genre: Mini-series
- Written by: Rex Rienits
- Country of origin: Australia
- Original language: English
- No. of seasons: 1
- No. of episodes: 10

Production
- Producer: Colin Dean
- Running time: 30 minutes

Original release
- Network: ABC Television
- Release: 7 July – 8 September 1963

The Hungry Ones is an Australian television mini-series. It was a period drama about a pair of husband and wife convicts trying to go straight, consisting of 10 30-minute black-and-white episodes, which aired on ABC. Unlike previous serials it was videotaped rather than performed live to camera.

Notably, the cast included Leonard Teale and Fay Kelton. Also appearing were Edward Hepple, Nigel Lovell, John Ewart, and Brigid Lenihan.

The archival status of the series is not known. It was among a series of four historical mini-series broadcast by ABC in the early 1960s, which had proved successful enough to encourage commercial broadcaster Seven Network to produce their own such series, Jonah, in 1962.

== Cast ==
- Leonard Teale as Will Bryant
- Fay Kelton as Mary Bryant
- Edward Hepple as Governor Phillip
- Nigel Lovell
- John Ewart
- Brigid Lenihan
- James Elliott
- Neil Fitzpatrick
- John Gray
- Ronald Morse
- Stan Polonsky
- John Unicomb as Captain Watkin Tench
- Owen Weingott as William Allen
- Carmen Duncan

== Production ==
Rex Rienits, who had written Stormy Petrel and The Outcasts but not Patriots, wrote episodes in London where he was living and sent them on.

Filming started June 1963 at Gore Hill.

It was an early TV role for Leonard Teale.

== Episodes ==
No.	Title	Original release date	Melbourne air date
1	Unknown	7 July 1963	21 July 1963
Meet the Bryants in Cornwall in 1784
2	"Bound for Botany Bay"	14 July 1963	28 July 1963
3	Unknown	21 July 1963	4 August 1963
4	Unknown	28 July 1963	11 August 1963
5	"Days of Famine"	4 August 1963	18 August 1963
6	Unknown	11 August 1963	25 August 1963
7	Unknown	18 August 1963	1 September 1963
8	"The Escape"	25 August 1963	8 September 1963
9	Unknown	1 September 1963	15 September 1963
10	Unknown	8 September 1963	22 September 1963

== Reception ==
An article in the 18 March 1964 edition of Australian Women's Weekly stated that the historical serials were "very good entertainment" with the exception of The Hungry Ones
