= James Elliott (actor) =

Australian actor

- James Elliott as Alf Sutcliffe in Number 96 (TV series)
- Born: James Campbell Elliott; 11 June 1928; Glasgow, Scotland
- Died: 12 February 2011 (aged 82); Sydney, New South Wales, Australia
- Other names: Jimmy Elliott, Elliott James
- Occupations: Television and film actor; theatre performer; radio actor
- Years active: 1949-1982, 1999-2008 (as actor)

James Campbell Elliott (11 June 1928 – 12 February 2011) alternately James Eliott and Elliot James, was a Scottish-born Australian radio, theatre, television and film actor and tipstaff. Elliott was best known as an original character in the 1970s television soap opera Number 96 as Alf Sutcliffe opposite co-star Elisabeth Kirkby who played his wife Lucy Sutcliffe.

== Biography ==
James Campbell Elliott was born in Glasgow, Scotland the second of 5 children to John Elliott and Katherine Campbell, and grew up in the Kelvinbridge area.

He emigrated from Scotland to Australia in December 1949, and took parts in radio plays and serials, and made several guesting parts in drama series including Consider Your Verdict and The Link Men and played Guildenstern in an ABC TV play of Hamlet, this being the first Shakespearean drama produced for Australian television. Other Shakespearean roles include Capulet in a theatre version Romeo and Juliet and a supporting role again at the ABC in The Tempest.

Elliot appeared in a role in the feature film of Ned Kelly in 1970 which starred Mick Jagger in the title role

Elliott was an original cast member of television soap opera Number 96 as Alf Sutcliffe, which in premiered March 1972. The show became Australia's highest-rated television program in 1973 and 1974. Alf and his wife Lucy (Elisabeth Kirkby) were immigrants from Yorkshire, England and Alf was presented as an archetypal "whingeing Pom" who complained constantly about Australia and longing to return to his native England, while proving himself incapable of holding down a regular job. The Sutcliffe's also endured Lucy's series of dramatic health concerns which included a breast cancer scare, blindness, and an unplanned pregnancy followed by a troubled birth, Alf however proved to be somewhat kind and understanding. In late 1973 the show had a feature film spin-off featuring much of the show's current cast, including both Elliott and Kirkby, reprising their television roles.

Despite once describing the serial as "instant television", Elliott played in Number 96 continuously for almost four years. In October 1975 Alf and Lucy were written out of Number 96 as part of a drastic remodelling of the show in the wake of declining ratings.

Elliott subsequently made guest appearances on Australian drama series such as Solo One (1976), Glenview High (1977), Chopper Squad (1978), played in three episodes of legal drama Case for the Defence (1978), and later appeared in an episode of crime drama Bellamy (1981). He also acted in feature films Summer City (1977), Money Movers (1978), Little Boy Lost (1978), Lady Stay Dead (1981), Brothers (1982).

His acting career was put on hold, when he tookma position as a tipstaff from 1982 and 1999

Later resuming his performing career he appeared in television guest appearances in series including Home and Away credited as Elliot James and three episodes of medical drama All Saints, in 2001 and 2003, and featured in film Running with the Boys. in 2008.

== Personal life ==
James Elliott died peacefully from Dementia with Lewy bodies disease on 12 February 2011. He was survived by two sons Greg and Doug with his first wife Mary McDonald whom he married in 1959, and one son James Elliott Jnr. by his second wife Elaine Minchin whom he married in 1980. He was honoured in the "In memorial" section of the Logie Awards in 2012

== Filmography ==
=== Film ===
Title	Year	Role	Type
1959	Hamlet	Guildenstern	TV movie
	The Tempest	Supporting role	TV movie
1959	Lady in Danger	Detective Pogson	TV movie
1959	Crime Passionel	Ivan	TV movie
1961	A Night Out		TV movie
1962	Fly by Night	Seaman	TV movie
1970	Ned Kelly	Pat O'Donnell (uncredited cameo)	Feature film
1974	Number 96	Alf Sutcliffe	Feature film
1977	Summer City	Caroline Father	Feature film
1978	Money Movers	Bengal Lancer	Feature film
1978	Little Boy Lost		Feature film
1978	Plunge Into Darkness	Farmer	TV movie
1981	Lady Stay Dead	Patrolman Rex Dunbar	Feature film
1982	Brothers	Reverend Maynard	TV movie
2008	Running with Boys	Len	

=== Television ===
Title	Year	Role	Type
1961	Whiplash	Ryan	TV series
1962	Consider Your Verdict		TV series, 1 episode
1963	The Hungry Ones		TV miniseries, 10 episodes
1968	Homicide	Eric Smith	TV series
1970	The Link Men	Doctor	TV series
1972	The Tony Hancock Special	Man in Pub	TV series
1972-75	Number 96	Alf Sutcliffe	TV series, 174 episodes
1976	Solo One	Terry Hood	TV series, 1 episode
1977	Glenview High		TV series, 1 episode
1978	Chopper Squad	Roger	TV series
1978	Case for the Defence	Detective / Policeman / Crawford	TV series, 3 episodes
1980	Water Under the Bridge	Preacher	TV series
1981	Bellamy	Gardner	TV series, 1 episode
1999	Home and Away	Dr. Doug Chamberlain	TV series
2001-03	All Saints	Les Davidson / Rex Gordon	TV series, 3 episodes
