= Phillip Grenville Mann =

Australian writer (1921–1990)

Phillip Grenville Mann (24 December 1921 – 19 June 1990) was an Australian actor, playwright, stage director and manager, and writer.

He won a series of prizes as a young writer. He served in the Royal Australian Navy.

He worked for six years in London. He became a staff writer at the ABC. He replaced Rex Rienits as drama editor at the ABC.

== Select writings ==
- The Seas between (1946) – radio play starring Peter Finch
- Dear Enemy (July 1951) – radio play
- The Cat Scratches (1954) - radio play
- Theatre Royal episode "Dead or Alive" (1956) – TV play – became Funnel Web
- Shadow Squad (1958) – TV series – various episodes
- The Verdict is Yours (1958) – TV series – various episodes
- The Probation Officer (1960) – TV series
- The Attorney General (1961) – TV play
- The Sergeant from Burralee (1961) – TV play
- The Patriots (1962) – TV series
- Funnel Web (1962) – TV play
- Ballad for One Gun' (1963) – TV play
- Day of Glory (1964) – play
- Luther (1964) – TV play – adaptation of the play by John Osborne
- The Keys of Heaven (1966) (novel)
- The Red Gardenia (1966) - radio play starring Ron Haddrick
- Undercover (1968) - radio play starring Richard Meikle
- Certain Women (1971) – TV series
- Eight Days a Week (1972) – play
- Candles in the Sun (1978) – novel
- How Sleep the Brave (1979) – play
- Over to Mother – a play
