= The Good Oil (musical) =

- Music: Coralie Condon
- Lyrics: Coralie Condon
- Productions: Radio 1959, television 1965

The Good Oil is a musical comedy with book, music and lyrics by Coralie Condon. It is set during the 1954-55 West Australian oil boom in Perth and an oil camp in the north of Western Australia.

The musical premiered in November 1958 at the Playhouse in Perth for the city's National Theatre.

The musical was adapted for radio on the ABC in 1959 with Toni Lamond.

== 1965 TV version ==
A television version with Kevin Johnston and Jill Perryman was produced in 1965 by TVW-7 in Perth. It was directed by Max Bostock.

=== Cast ===
- Jill Perryman
- Kevan Johnston
- Margot Robertson
- Vic Hawkins
- Bill McPherson
- John Chalton
- Neville Teede
- Philip Porter
- Joan Bruce
- Gerry Atkinson
- Veronica Overton
- Danni Harford
- The Channel 7 Dancers – Jennifer Hayden, Karen Obbs, Janet Ladner, Adrienne O’Meara, Gay Chandler and Clarice Page

== See also ==
- A Sleep Of Prisoners (1961)
- Portrait Of A Star (1963)
- The Rose and Crown (1963)
