= A Night Out (1961 film) =

- The Age 20 Dec 1961
- Written by: Harold Pinter
- Directed by: Alan Burke
- Starring: Neva Carr Glynn
- Country of origin: Australia
- Original language: English

Original release
- Release: 7 November 1961 (Sydney, live)
- Release: 20 December 1961 (Melbourne, taped)
- Release: 12 June 1962 (Brisbane)

A Night Out is a 1961 Australian television play. It was based on A Night Out by Harold Pinter. It starred John Ewart and Richard Meikle.

The play had previously been filmed in England in 1960 for Armchair Theater. It was one of three plays the BBC commissioned from Pinter. The BBC also did the play for radio a version which had been broadcast in Australia by the ABC. The TV production was shot in Sydney.

== Cast ==
- John Ewart as Albert
- Neva Carr-Glynn as Mother
- Brigid Lenihan as Girl
- Noel Brophy as Mr. King
- James Elliott
- Tom Farley
- John Godfrey
- Nat Levison
- Richard Meikle as Gidney
- Joseph Szabo
- Carole Boyce
- Carole Taylor
- Lou Vernon
- Martin Magee

== Production ==
Designed Desmonde Dowling constructed four unique sets. It was the 20th live play directed by Alan Burke who said "though this is a drama it is never far from comedy. Pinter's special talent is to see the ironic humour in ordinary people's frustrations, as well as the incipient horror in their most everyday actions. The playwright's vivid life among people with tangy speech and his experience as an actor give him an extraordinary command of language."

== Release ==
The Sunday Sydney Morning Herald called it "a brilliant bit of production, and one of the best contemporary dramas the Sydney studios of the A.B.C. has done yet. "

The Sydney Morning Herald thought Ewart was "excellent" but felt the female leads over-acted.

== See also ==
- List of television plays broadcast on Australian Broadcasting Corporation (1960s)
