= The Rape of the Belt =

- Based on: play by Benn Levy
- Directed by: Henri Safran
- Starring: Tony Ward; Fernande Glyn; Reg Livermore
- Country of origin: Australia
- Original language: English

Production
- Running time: 70 mins
- Production company: ABC

Original release
- Network: ABC
- Release: 2 September 1964 (Sydney)
- Release: 9 September 1964 (Melbourne)
- Release: 4 November 1964 (Brisbane)

The Rape of the Belt is a 1964 Australian television film based on the play by Benn Levy.

== Plot ==
Heracles and Theseus, two celebrated heroes, arrive at Themiscyra, the Amazons' capital, to accomplish the ninth of the Labours of Heracles, stealing Hippolyte's belt. They are confronted by Antiope and Hippolyte.

== Cast ==
- Tony Ward as Heracles
- Reg Livermore as Theseus
- Fernande Glyn as Antiope, the Amazonian Queen
- Arlene Dorgan as Hippolyte
- Neva Carr Glyn as Hera
- Chris Christensen as Zeus
- Sheila Kennelly as Hippobomene
- Ethel Lang as Thalestris
- Victoria Anoux as Anthea
- Susanne Haworth as Diasta

== Production ==
Benn Levy's play had been performed by the Elizabethan Theatre Trust in 1960. Star Tony Ward was best known at the time for presenting the show Seven Days. Ward worked out for two months and grew a beard for the role. He injured his leg and used crutches during rehearsals.

Some scenes were shot at Kurnell and Whale Beach.

It was an early TV role for Reg Livermore.

== Reception ==
The Sydney Morning Herald called it "amusingly lively and buoyant."

Filmink called it "a fun watch".
