= Kit Taylor =

Australian actor

- Born: Christopher John Taylor; April 1942 (aged 84); Sydney, Australia
- Occupation: Actor
- Known for: Long John Silver (1954); The Adventures of Long John Silver (1956–1957); Number 96 (1975–1976)
- Father: Grant Taylor

Christopher John 'Kit' Taylor (born April 1942) is an Australian former actor, who started his career as a child performer.

== Early life ==
Kit Taylor (born Christoper John Taylor) was born in April 1942 in Sydney, New South Wales, Australia, and is the son of English-Australian actor Grant Taylor and Margaret Hazlett. He grew up in Potts Point, Sydney.

== Career ==
Taylor made his acting debut at the age of twelve, portraying Jim Hawkins in both the film Long John Silver (1954) and the associated TV series The Adventures of Long John Silver (1956–1957). He went on to play the recurring roles of David Carmichael in sci-fi miniseries The Interpretaris (1966), Trooper Davis in soap opera The Box (1974), Warwick Thompson in Number 96 (1975–1976), and both Tim Barclay and Peter O'Neill in Crawford Productions series Skyways (1979).

He also appeared in numerous television guest roles, in series such as Consider Your Verdict, Homicide, Division 4, Bluey, Chopper Squad, The Young Doctors, Cop Shop, Carson's Law, A Country Practice and Flipper.

His film credits include Don's Party (1976), Weekend of Shadows and Newsfront (both 1978), Early Frost (1982) and Cassandra (1987).

He also acted in theatre productions such as Summer of the Seventeenth Doll, Alice in Wonderland, Breaker Morant, Richard III, The Club and Crown Matrimonial.

Taylor briefly moved abroad to play the part of the Doctor in 1971 British film Assault, but returned to Australia in 1974.

== Filmography ==
=== Film ===
Year	Title	Role	Notes
1954	Long John Silver	Jim Hawkins	
1959	Turn of the Road		Short
1971	Assault	Doctor	
1976	Don’s Party	Evan	
1978	Weekend of Shadows	Ryan	
1978	Newsfront	Fay's Brother	
1982	Early Frost	Paul Sloane	
1984	Innocent Prey	Joe	
1987	Cassandra	Harrison	
1995	Rough Diamonds	Les Finnigan	

=== Television ===
Year	Title	Role	Notes
1956–57	The Adventures of Long John Silver	Jim Hawkins	Main role, 22 episodes
1957	The Three Drovers		TV movie
1964	Bertrand	Jacki	TV movie
1964	Consider Your Verdict		Episode 160: "Queen Versus Wilson"
1964–1965	The Stranger	RMSF Smith	Miniseries, 2 episodes
1964–1975	Homicide	Laurie Fielding / James Curtin / George Tatnell / Tony Clarke / Cliff Ferguson	5 episodes
1965	The Magic Boomerang		2 episodes
1966	Australian Playhouse	Brian	Episode 18: "Haywire"
1966	The Interpretaris	David Carmichael	TV miniseries, 6 episodes
1967	My Name's McGooley, What's Yours?		Episode 8: "The Homecoming"
1967	Wandjina!	Constable Jack Hankey	Episode 7
1967	Love and War	Matt	Miniseries, episode 5: "Intersection"
1967	Adventures of the Seaspray	Nathan	Episode 32: "Forgotten Island"
1969	The Wednesday Play	Barman	Episode 5: "The Sad Decline of Arthur Maybury"
1969	Who-Dun-It	Alex Jarvis	Episode 13: "A High Class Death"
1969; 1970	The Troubleshooters	Ted Raven / Jimmy Tyler	2 episodes: "And One Wise Man Came Out from the East", "Operation Black Gold"
1971	Paul Temple	Alan MacAfee	Episode 5: "Death for Divers' Reasons"
1971	The Persuaders!	Croupier	Episode 8: "Anyone Can Play"
1974	The Box	Trooper Davis	8 episodes
1975	Behind the Legend		Season 3, episode 12: "Tom Roberts"
1975	Division 4	Ray Woods	Season 7, episode 35: "Dead Fall"
1975	Quality of Mercy	Tom	Anthology series, episode 1: "Sally Go Round the Moon"
1975–1976	Number 96	Warwick Thompson	49 episodes
1976–1977	Bluey	Charles Parker / Jack Stevens	2 episodes: "A Few Quiet Questions", "Lonely Ordeal"
1977	Born to Run (aka Harness Fever)	Paul Sanford	TV film
1977	The Restless Years		
1978	Chopper Squad	Barge Supervisor	Season 2, episode 5: "8:52 A.M."
1979	Skyways	Tim Barclay / Peter O'Neil	24 episodes
1980	People Like Us	Jim Brookes	TV movie
1981	Intimate Strangers	Greg	TV movie
1981	The Young Doctors	Steve Newman	3 episodes
1982	Wilde's Domain	Dan Wilde	TV movie
1978–1982	Cop Shop	Arthur Scott / Brian Lambert / Philip Kendal / Larousse / Trevor Burke	9 episodes
1984	Carson's Law	Dunworth Findlay	Episode 103: "Verdict: Not Innocent"
1985	Possession	Alan Kennedy	Miniseries, 3 episodes
1983–1989	A Country Practice	Brian Cox / Farmer Gunn / Tom Gunn / Ronnie Thompson	8 episodes
1991	Heroes II: The Return	Roma's Father	Miniseries, 2 episodes
1991	Sex	Dad	TV special
1993	Mercy Mission: The Rescue of Flight 771	Captain Warren Banks	TV film
2000	The Lost World	Largo / Tom Layton	Episode: "Prodigal Father"

== Theatre ==
Year	Title	Role	Notes
1966	Summer of the Seventeenth Doll		AMP Theatrette, Sydney with Q Theatre Company
1966	Alice in Wonderland		Tivoli Theatre, Sydney, Phillip Street Theatre, Sydney
1975	The Zoo Story		AMP Theatrette, Sydney with Q Theatre Company
1976	Da		Theatre Royal, Hobart, Civic Theatre, Burnie, Princess Theatre, Launceston with Tasmanian Theatre Company
1977	All My Sons	Chris	Playhouse, Adelaide with STCSA
1977	Too Early to Say: A Place in the Present	Warwick Lock	Playhouse, Adelaide
1978	Mothers and Fathers	Terry Boon	Twelfth Night Theatre, Brisbane
1978	Catch Me If You Can	Daniel Corban	Twelfth Night Theatre, Brisbane
1979	You Never Can Tell	Finch M'Comas	SGIO Theatre, Brisbane with QTC
1979	Breaker Morant	Lt Peter Handcock	SGIO Theatre, Brisbane with QTC
1979	The Man Who Came to Dinner	Bert Jefferson	SGIO Theatre, Brisbane with QTC
1980	Richard III	Lord Hastings	SGIO Theatre, Brisbane with QTC
1981	The Shifting Heart	Clarry Fowler	Marian Street Theatre, Sydney
1985	The Club		Phillip Street Theatre, Sydney
1985–1986	Crown Matrimonial		Sydney Opera House, Twelfth Night Theatre, Brisbane, Cairns Civic Theatre, Townsville Civic Theatre, Pilbeam Theatre, Rockhampton, Melbourne Athenaeum, Canberra Theatre
1988	Night and Day	Dick Wagner	Suncorp Theatre, Brisbane with QTC
1988	The Archbishop’s Ceiling		Ensemble Theatre, Sydney
