= Last Rites (1975 film) =

- Written by: Colin Free
- Directed by: Brian Bell
- Starring: Michael Craig; Cornelia Frances; Nigel Lovell; John Hargreaves
- Country of origin: Australia
- Original language: English

Production
- Producer: Charles Russell
- Running time: 65 mins
- Production company: ABC

Original release
- Release: 20 March 1975

Last Rites is a 1975 Australian television play.

It later aired in 1977 as an episode of Stuart Wagstaff's World Playhouse.

== Premise ==
Industrialist Eric Cordett, arranges a meeting with an Asian consortium at his country house miles out of Sydney. It is seven years since his wife, Viola, was kidnapped from the house, never to be seen again, and Cordett has not been there since. He now has control of his wife's assets. Ex-chief inspector Beecham, an investigator associated with the case, turns up.

== Cast ==
- Michael Craig as Eric Cordett
- Cornelia Frances as Elaine
- Nigel Lovell as Beecham
- John Hargreaves as Bennett
- John Derum as Dymock
- Jo Stenning as Viola
- Max Osbiston
