= The Taming of the Shrew (1962 film) =

1962 Australian television play by Alan Burke

- Based on: play The Taming of the Shrew by William Shakespeare
- Written by: Alan Burke
- Directed by: Alan Burke
- Starring: Ron Haddrick
- Country of origin: Australia
- Original language: English

Original release
- Release: 22 August 1962 (Sydney)
- Release: 2 September 1962 (Melbourne)
- Release: 9 September 1962 (Brisbane)

The Taming of the Shrew is a 1962 Australian television play, adapted by Alan Burke from the play by William Shakespeare. It stars Ron Haddrick and Brigid Lenihan.

The play was done live but it included some filmed sequences shot in Centennial Park.

Australian TV drama was relatively rare at the time.

== Cast ==
- Ron Haddrick as Petruchio
- Brigid Lenihan as Katherina
- Noel Brophy as a suitor
- Jon Ewing as a page
- Judi Farr as the sister
- Richard Meikle as Tranio
- Don Pascoe
- Alec Pucci
- Charles Tasman
- Malcolm Billings
- Moya O’Sullivan
- Donald Philips

== Production ==
Alan Burke called the play "brilliantly theatrical. It plays like an express train and takes everyone with it." Burke said in adapting the play for television "I did a lot of work on the play - and fond that sub plots and prologue take up almost two thirds of the running time. We have trimmmed it back to about one third of the total length and the play now goes like a dream with the principals were strong and clear."

Geoffrey Wedlock did the sets. The costumes and decor were from the mid 17th century. It was Alan Burke's 14th play (he had also done 8 operas and musicals) and second Shakespeare adaptation on TV.

== Reception ==
The Bulletin praised the acting.

The Sydney Morning Herald called it "a cheerfully handsome achievement."
