= A Bird in a Gilded Cage (film) =

- Written by: Patricia Hooker
- Country of origin: Australia
- Original language: English

Production
- Running time: 10 minutes
- Production company: TCN-9

Original release
- Release: 1957

A Bird in a Gilded Cage is a short 10-minute Australian television play. It was one of the rare Australian dramas at the time. It was the first screen credit for Patricia Hooker who in 1960 called it "just a 10-minute Victorian melodrama... but it's a good start and has inspired me to begin another television play - a half-hour effort this time."

Australian TV drama was relatively rare at the time.
