= Patricia Hooker =

Australian writer (1933 – 2001)

Patricia Hooker (17 February 1933 – 1April 2001) was an Australian playwright and dramatist who worked extensively in England. She wrote also radio scripts and television screenplays and was also a court reporter

She wrote The Golden Road, the first play on British television that was both written by a woman and about a lesbian relationship.

== Biography ==
She was born in the town of Port Lincoln in South Australia and trained as a stenographer. She began writing in her spare time and her work began appearing in amateur theatres. She worked as a secretary at the Stevedoring Commission in Sydney and also as a court reporter.

Hooker was working as a shorthand typist in a city office in 1959 when she wrote the story for The Little Woman at home in the evenings. She wrote it as a stage play and it was included in a night of one-act plays at the Genesian Theatre. To help it reach a wider audience, Patricia studied a book on TV technique and decided to revise the script as a TV play. The ABC produced it in 1961 by which time she was at the ABC as a script assistant.

She moved to London in 1964 and worked as a court reporter as well as writing for TV and radio.

She died in Kensington, London in 2001

== Select credits ==
- A Bird in a Gilded Cage (1957) – TV play
- The Little Woman (1961) – TV play
- Twilight of a Hero (1962) – radio play about King David's love for Absalom
- Poet's Corner (1962) - radio writer
- Concord of Sweet Sounds (1963) – TV play and adapted for radio
- George (1964) - lunch hour play from short story by Anthony West
- A Season in Hell (1964) – TV play – later adapted for radio
- Man of Blood (1964) - play
- The Winged Chariot (1967) - radio play about Socrates
- The Lotus Eaters (1968) – play
- Counterstrike (1969) – TV series
- A Fit and Proper Person (1970) - TV play
- Kate (1971–73) - TV series
- Last Seen Wearing (1972) - radio play
- Harriets Back in Town (1972–73) - TV series
- Harriet's Back in Town (1973) – TV series
- Armchair Theatre - "The Golden Road" (1973) - TV play
- Crown Court (1973) - TV series
- The Beauty of the World (1973) - radio play
- Simon Fenton's Story (1973) - TV play
- "Going to St Ives" (1973) - TV play
- Six Days of Justice (1973–75) – TV series
- The Carnforth Practice (1974) – TV series
- Rooms (1975) – TV series
- Angels (1976) – TV series - episode "Off Duty"
- The Gentle Touch (1980) – "Chance", "Rogue"
- Plays for Pleasure – "The Concubine" (1981) – Tv episode
- Survival (1989) - radio play
- Right Ho Jeeves (1989) - radio play
- Seven Against Reeves (1989) - radio play
