= John Fegan (actor) =

Australian actor

- Born: John Joseph Fegan; 18 July 1908; Belfast, Northern Ireland
- Died: 9 April 1981 (aged 72); Australia
- Other name: Jack Fegan
- Occupation: Actor
- Years active: 1930–1975
- Known for: Homicide; Division 4 Picnic at Hanging Rock

John Joseph Fegan (18 July 1908 – 9 April 1981) was a Northern Irish-Australian film and television actor. Also known as Jack Fegan, he appeared in many Australian films and television shows in the 1950s, 1960s and 1970s, including the long-running series Homicide as Inspector Jack Connelly, and a featured role in the international breakthrough film Picnic at Hanging Rock.

== Early life ==
Fegan was born in Belfast, Northern Ireland, and grew up in the Falls Road area. He migrated to Australia in 1929, working as a labourer in Sydney and as a harbourside worker on The Hungry Mile during the Great Depression. He became involved in the worker's theatre movement, in particular with the New Theatre League from the 1930s onwards, receiving generally positive reviews for his performances.

Fegan continued working on the docks throughout his working life, never committing fully to his acting career.

He joined the Australian Army during World War II and served in New Guinea.

== Career ==
=== Homicide ===
Homicide was the first major television drama series to be produced in Australia, the domestic television market having been previously dominated by American and British imports. Homicide proved that there was a market for home-grown programming and was highly successful. For this reason, as well as for inspiring a series of popular police dramas that followed, it remains one of the most important programmes in the history of Australian television.

Fegan starred as Inspector Jack Connolly, head of the squad – a seasoned policeman in the classic dry, gruff mould that remains popular in similar shows today. The name Connolly was selected to reflect the Irish influence in Australian police forces and no doubt it helped to account for Fegan's still strong Belfast accent. The show was so popular and considered so accurate (police procedure was followed faithfully and police advisors ensured that things were done correctly) that the actors were often confused for real police officers and, at one point, Fegan was invited to a policeman's ball.

Fegan retired from Homicide in 1969.

In 2007, Homicide was chosen for a 50-cent stamp to celebrate 50 years of television in Australia. Fegan, as Inspector Connolly, is standing in the centre of the stamp, flanked by fellow original cast members Lex Mitchell and Terry McDermott.

=== Division 4 ===
After leaving Homicide, John Fegan guest starred in a number of other television series. In particular, he appeared as the recently released from prison John Kelso in episode 100 of Division 4, another Australian police drama. The episode was critically lauded and Fegan received a Logie Award for 'Best Individual Acting Performance' for his efforts.

== Awards ==
Year	Work	Award	Category	Result
1972	Division 4 (episode: "The Return of John Kelso)	Logie Awards	Best Individual Acting Performance	Won

== Acting credits ==
=== Film ===
Year	Title	Role	Notes
1946	The Overlanders	Police Sergeant	Feature film
1949	Eureka Stockade	Hayes	Feature film
1949	Sons of Matthew	Jack Warrington	Feature film
1952	Kangaroo (aka The Australian Story)	Burke (uncredited)	Feature film
1955	Captain Thunderbolt	Sergeant Dalton	Feature film
1956	Smiley	Nobby	Feature film
1958	Smiley Gets a Gun	Tom Graham	Feature film
1960	The Sundowners	Drover (uncredited)	Feature film
1974	Moving On	Unemployed Grower	Feature film
1975	Picnic at Hanging Rock	Doctor McKenzie	Feature film
1975	Ride a Wild Pony	Town Doctor	Feature film

=== Television ===
Year	Title	Role	Notes
1959	Hamlet	Ghost	TV play
1959	Crime Passionel	Charles	TV movie
1960	The Square Ring	Docker Starkie	TV play
1960; 1961	Whiplash	Capart / Peter Garth	2 episodes
1961	The Outcasts	Flagellator	1 episode
1962	The Patriots	John O'Toole	Miniseries, 2 episodes
1962	Consider Your Verdict	Owen Bresley	1 episode
1962	Jonah		1 episode
1964	The Stranger	Police Officer	1 episode
1964	The Purple Jacaranda	Detective	Miniseries, 1 episode
1964–1969	Homicide	Inspector Jack Connolly	205 episodes
1970	The Link Men	Max Hilden	TV series, 1 episode
1971	Dead Men Running	Martin Walsh	Miniseries, 5 episodes
1971; 1973	Division 4	Jack Hennessy / John Kelso	2 episodes
1972	The Spoiler		1 episode
1972	Spyforce	Sean Reilly	1 episode
1973–1974	Certain Women	Fred Lucas / Tom Lucas / Tom	10 episodes
1974	Silent Number	Deadbeat	1 episode
1974	Eye of the Spiral		TV movie
1975	Behind the Legend		Anthology series, season 3, episode 2: "Percy Grainger"
1975	Shannon's Mob	Corby	1 episode
1971–1976	Matlock Police	Cyrus McGibbon / Jim Baker / Dan Regan	4 episodes
1976	McCloud	Doc	1 episode
1976	Luke's Kingdom	The Priest	Miniseries, 1 episode
1978	Chopper Squad	Red Simmons	TV series

=== Theatre ===
Year	Title	Role	Notes
1947	The Shepherd and the Hunter		New Theatre, Sydney
1948	The Governor of the Province		New Theatre, Sydney
1949	Juno and the Paycock		New Theatre, Sydney

== Incidents of note ==
Fegan appeared uncredited as a drover in the 1960 film The Sundowners. Robert Mitchum, who starred in the film, is quoted as having said of that production "We didn't have stuntmen, so they got an Irish expatriate off the docks, and he beat the tar out of me" (referring to filming brawl scene). Fegan was the Irish expatriate in question.

In 1970 Fegan guest starred in an episode of The Link Men, yet another Australian police drama. It would have been a footnote in a short-lived series, but for an incident on set. Two young actors were performing or rehearsing a fight scene when Frank Packer, the owner of the Nine Network, came in. Packer, who had been a boxer in his younger days but who at the time was in his mid-sixties, declared that they were doing it wrong and demonstrated the correct technique by putting the actor playing the police officer in a headlock. Fegan, also in his sixties, had been watching from behind the camera and suggested that, since the young actor was the one who was supposed to be performing the headlock then perhaps Packer should demonstrate on him (Fegan) so the young actor could watch. Packer got Fegan in the same headlock but Fegan, who had also been a boxer in his younger days, got the better of him and Packer ended up on the ground. According to an article about the event in the Sydney Morning Herald, Packer's hearing aid came flying out and Fegan lashed out and crushed it with his foot. Packer insisted that Fegan be fired on the spot. Upon being advised that Fegan was performing a single episode guest role only, Packer's response was reportedly "Well, sack him when he's finished".

== Political activism ==
Radicalised both by his formative years as a Belfast Catholic (having been involved with the Fianna before leaving Northern Ireland) and the Great Depression, Fegan was active in a variety of left wing movements associated with the Australian labour movement in Sydney throughout in particular his early life, including the Communist Party of Australia (CPA), the Sydney variants of the Unemployed Workers Movement/Workers Defence Committee (UWM/WDC) and a small group called the "Irish Terrorists Association" or "Irish Brigade" (one of the ten members of which it later turned out was an undercover policeman).

In Fegan family history its said that during his membership in the Irish Brigade, he inflitrated Victoria Barracks and stole several rifles and a machine gun. He is reported to have planned a bank robbery in Annandale but it was called off when his accomplice didn't arrive. Fegan met his first wife Edna Stack when delivering dynamite obtained from militant members of the South Coast Miners Union to Edna's father.
