= Julianna Allan =

Australian actress

Julianna Allan was an Australian actress. She played an Aboriginal girl in Wandjina! (1966).

== Select credits ==
=== Radio ===
- Silver Wedding (1958) - radio
- Flash Point (1959) - radio

=== Stage ===
- Return Journey (1960)
- Orphan Girl (1961)

=== TV series ===
- The Story of Peter Gray (1962)
- Consider Your Verdict (episode: "Queen Versus Bent") (1962) as Lynne Driscoll
- Jonah (1962)
- Split Level (TV play) (1964) as Carol
- Wandjina! (1966) as Linda
- Homicide (episode: "Freakout") (1967)
- Hunter (episode: "The Singapore File") (1967)
- Vega 4 (1968) as Ensign Poitier
- Division 4 (episode: "Where's Lefty") (1970)
- Matlock Police (episode: They'll Fix You Up, No Worries") (1974)
- Aboriginal Legends (1974) - Narrator
- Special Squad (episode: "Easy Street") (1984)
