= Brigid Lenihan =

New Zealand actor

Brigid Lenihan (1929–1970) was a New Zealand actor who worked extensively in Australia on stage and screen.

She died in her sleep aged 41.

== Select TV credits ==
- The Face of Love (1954)
- The Little Woman (1961)
- A Night Out (1961)
- Lola Montez (1962)
- Red Peppers (1962)
- The Taming of the Shrew (1962)
- My Three Angels (1962)
- Jonah (1962)
- The Right Thing (1963)
- The Hungry Ones (1963)
- The Mavis Bramston Show (1965)
- Goodbye, Gloria, Hello! (1967)

== Select theatre ==
- Six Characters in Search of an Author (1949)
- Boeing Boeing (1964)
- A Cat Among the Pigeons (1970)
