= Goodbye, Gloria, Hello! =

Goodbye, Gloria, Hello! is a 1967 TV play broadcast by the Australian Broadcasting Corporation. It ran for a little over an hour and aired on ABC on 10 April 1967. It was written by Peter Kenna. It was based on a stage play.

== Plot ==
According to the Sydney Morning Herald, "a stuffed dog, a canary and a lodger come first in what loosely may be termed Gloria's affection." A hen pecked husband, Clive, decides there must be at least one way of getting rid of his wife, Gloria.

== Cast ==
- Brigid Lenihan as Gloria
- Joan MacArthur as Gloria's vengeful sister
- Brian James as Clive
- William Hodge as Hopgood the lodger
- John Roddick

== Reception ==
The Age called it "exciting... something to see."

Filmink said "There’s some broad playing, nice lighting and the running time of 75 minutes is too long for the material, which feels like it should clock in at an hour."

== 1964 ==
The play had aired on the BBC in 1964 as Goodbye Gloria Goodbye. The Sunday Times said it was "not wholly successful, but... of a distinctive flavour"

== See also ==
- List of television plays broadcast on Australian Broadcasting Corporation (1960s)
