= A Fourth for Bridge =

- Written by: Denis Johnston
- Directed by: Alan Burke
- Starring: Richard Meikle
- Country of origin: Australia
- Original language: English

Production
- Running time: 30 minutes

Original release
- Release: 17 July 1957 (live, Sydney)
- Release: 16 August 1957 (recording, Melbourne)

A Fourth for Bridge is a 1957 Australian TV play starring Richard Meikle. It aired on the ABC.

== Plot ==
Several POWs travel in Italian aircraft in World War Two. They play a card game.

== Cast ==
- Hans Eisler
- Al Garcia
- Nigel Lovell as the Air Force Type
- Richard Meikle
- Don Pascoe as the Hussar
- Melpo Zarokosta

== Production ==
It was directed by Alan Burke, who was borrowed from the Elizabethan Theatre Trust. It was the first directing he did for the ABC. "In those days there were no people there to provide support and guidance," recalled Burke. "All one could do was talk to other producers afterwards. What I was not confident about was 'calling the shots'. But as we had only 2 cameras in those days it was not a big problem."

== See also ==
- List of live television plays broadcast on Australian Broadcasting Corporation (1950s)
