= The Sergeant from Burralee =

1961 Australian television play

- Advertisement from The Age 14 Jun 1961
- Written by: Phillip Grenville Mann
- Directed by: Raymond Menmuir
- Country of origin: Australia
- Original language: English

Production
- Running time: 75 mins
- Production company: ABC

Original release
- Network: ABC
- Release: 22 March 1961 (live, Sydney)
- Release: 14 June 1961 (Melbourne)
- Release: 27 March 1962 (Brisbane)

The Sergeant from Burralee is an Australian television play written by Phillip Grenville Mann. The play was also broadcast by the BBC and screened for West German television.

It was turned into a radio play in 1970. Mann then adapted it into a play Day of Glory.

== Plot ==
In the 1830s, a white settler is speared in the Newcastle district. An Aboriginal, Jacko, is charged with the crime. However Captain Alcot interrogates Jacko, becomes convinced of his innocence, and sends a despatch to Sydney saying he is going to release the man. That night a party is held in the officers' mess and, in a drunken stupor, Lt Ned Louden shoots Jacko in the back.

Urged on by Nathaniel Carlton, the resident magistrate, Captain Alcot writes to Sydney to explain the situation. Louden is arrested and brought to Sydney for a trial. Thomas Morland, the acting attorney-general, is sent to Newcastle to investigate the murder.

Captain Alcot wishes to keep on the good side of the land-hungry Carlton so they attempt to defend the drunken lieutenant who has shot a native. Neither believe the prisoner Jacko had anything to do with the murder of a white settler, since he was captured 60 miles away from the crime. So they bribe Sergeant Constantine, who arrested Jacko, into saying that the place of arrest was close to Newcastle.

At a trial in Sydney, the lieutenant is charged with murder by the Acting Attorney-General. False testimony by Constantine brings a verdict of not guilty; but the playwright makes it clear that it is as much a victory as a defeat—"people will have second thoughts" about molesting aborigines after this.

== Cast ==
- Alistair Duncan as Thomas Morland, the acting Attorney General
- Deryck Barnes as Sgt Constantine
- Gordon Glenwright as Captain Alcot
- Candy Williams as Jacko
- Stewart Ginn as Nathaniel Carlton
- Fernande Glyn as Constantine's wife Bessie
- Hugh Stewart as Robert McDonald
- John Gray as Sgt Lane
- Reg Lye as Joshua Beer
- Keith Buckley as Jack Salisbury
- Noanie Roathsay as Matha Sailsbury
- Edward Hepple
- Jon Dennis as Newton
- Douglas Bladen as Sentry
- Lance Bennett as Taylor
- Phillip Ross as Gaoler
- Max Meldrum as the lieutenant
- Nigel Lovell
- Moray Powell

== Production ==
The play was based on a real life trial when a soldier was charged with the murder of an Aboriginal. It was written by Philip Grenville Mann, an Australian writer who was living in England. He got the idea for the play after reading historical records at Australia House in London; he read about the accidental shooting of an Aboriginal during the time of Governor Phillip and did further research. He wrote it originally under the title The Sergeant from Lone Pine.

The play won equal first prize in the 1959 New South Wales Journalists' Club Award out of 250 entries. (The other winner was J.V. Warner's World Without End.) President of the Journalists' Club was Kenneth Slessor and the judges, representing each of the three Sydney television stations, were Brett Porter (ATN-7), Raymond Menmuir (ABN-2) and Peter Benardos (TCN-9). Menmuir says the moment he read it, he suggested the ABC buy it. "It's a darned fine play," said Menmuir. "The scenes are short, the action moves swiftly and smoothy and it has a universality of appeal."

Mann returned to Australia in 1961 after six years in England and replaced Rex Rienits as the ABC's drama editor. He would later write the historical ABC drama series The Patriots.

It was shot live at the ABC's studios in Sydney. Alistair Duncan was an English actor who had recently settled in Australia and had played Captain Bligh's secretary in Stormy Petrel. Sets and costumes were by Geoff Wedlock. Nine sets were constructed for the play, including gaols and courtrooms.

== Reception ==
The Sydney Morning Herald wrote that "it is an admirable play, dealing searchingly with the impulses, compulsions and motives of a gallery of characters...The production... was quite gripping; the play itself, most notably in the courtroom scenes, showed how telling a medium TV can be... this play was one of the best the A.B.C. has done."

Val Marshall from the Sunday edition of the Herald said it "let me with that rather unsatisfactory feeling of a good piece of material well handled, but which could have been a great deal better than it was" saying that "it got first rate treatment from Raymond Menmuir" but felt 90 minutes was too long and Duncan was miscast."

== 1961 BBC version ==
In May 1960 the BBC announced they would film the play, then known as The Sergeant of Lone Pine. The play was filmed by the BBC in 1961 as The Attorney General It was directed by Harold Clayton.

=== Cast ===
- John Clements as Thomas Morland
- André van Gyseghem as Nathaniel Carlton
- Olive McFarland as Bessie Constantine
- Anthony Bate as Sergeant Lane
- Norman Mitchell as Sergeant Constantine
- James Sharkey as Lieutenant Ned Louden
- Richard Vernon as Captain Alcot
- Michael Danvers-Walker as James Newton
- Leonard Cracknell as Frank Taylor
- Sonny Pillay as Jacko
- John Wilding as The Sentry
- Ronald Adam as Robert MacDonald
- Christopher Hodge as John Sanders
- Robert Cawdron as Joshua Beer
- Carole Ann Ford as Martha Salisbury

=== Reception ===
The Daily Telegraph called it "strong drama... an uncommonly interesting 90 minutes."

The Sunday Times called it "a solidly made, thoroughly decent piece of joinery."

== Radio ==
It was also adapted for radio.

== Day of Glory ==
Mann adapted the story into a play Day of Glory which had its debut in 1964 at the Old Tote in Sydney.

The play was revived in 1970 in Melbourne.

The Age called it "a play of good ideas treated with good stagecraft."

== See also ==
- List of television plays broadcast on Australian Broadcasting Corporation (1960s)
