= Raymond Menmuir =

British-Australian director and producer

- Born: Raymond Edward Menmuir; 30 September 1930; Perth, Western Australia, Australia
- Died: 26 March 2016 (aged 85)
- Occupations: Television director, television producer
- Partner: Wendy Blacklock

Raymond Edward Menmuir (10 September 1930 – 26 March 2016) was a British-Australian director and producer. His career included producing 44 episodes of The Professionals and directing The Avengers and Upstairs, Downstairs

He also produced an Australian version of The Professionals called Special Squad for the Ten Network in 1984. Menmuir had a notable professional collaboration with the writer Alan Seymour.

== Early life ==
Menmuir was born in Perth, Western Australia, as the eldest of four children to Edward Menmuir and his wife Dorothy (née Williams). Menmuir was educated at Wesley College.

== Career ==
Menmuir started his career as a reporter at the newspaper Perth Daily News, but he then transferred to the Australian Broadcasting Commission as a radio producer.

He was deeply impressed by European culture, by seeing various films at the 1953 Festival of the Arts in Perth, and then took artistic inspiration from various films including Marcel Pagnol's Cesar, Vittorio de Sica's Bicycle Thieves, and Mikhail Kalatozov's The Cranes are Flying. This came out when he was soon directing dramas at the ABC's television drama department in Sydney. He directed the second play to be televised, J.B. Priestly's The Rose and Crown written specifically for television, and the first play from the new (1958) Gore Hill complex, Barbara Vernon's The Multi-Coloured Umbrella. Annette Andre recalled him as "a good director, he knew what he was doing."

He originally directed all sorts of programs for the ABC but in October 1959 was assigned to drama full time.

Probably his greatest achievement in these years was the 5 October 1960 live production in prime time of the two-hour epic Shakespeare play, The Life and Death of King Richard II, using all three studios at Gore Hill.

In 1961, Menmuir and his then wife Heidi moved to London. Menmuir directed for stage Alan Seymour's play, The One Day of the Year at Theatre Royal Stratford East, which started his association with many production venues.

Menmuir returned to Australia in 1963 to direct Ballad for One Gun and The Right Thing.

His productions included: Z Cars, The Avengers, No Hiding Place, Corridors of Power, and The Duchess of Duke Street. In 1974 he directed the adaptation of the Lord Peter Wimsey story The Nine Tailors for the BBC.

In 1978, he was offered full freedom of control as producer for London Weekend Television's show, The Professionals.

During several returns to Australia, he was responsible for Ballad for One Gun (1963) (about Ned Kelly), and Special Squad and the movie Fortress for Crawford Productions.

== Personal life ==
In the UK, Menmuir lived in rural Buckinghamshire.

In his later years, Menmuir settled in Australia at Mirrabooka on the western side of Lake Macquarie

Menmuir was married twice. He and his first wife, Heidi (née Isenmann) had a daughter, Anna. He had a daughter, Fiona, and a son, Ian with his second wife, Jennifer (née Cooper) (d. 2010). His partner after this time was the actor and entrepreneur Wendy Blacklock.

Menmuir's sister was the second wife of test cricketer Arthur Morris.

== Select credits ==
- Shadow of Doubt (1957) - TV play
- The Rose and Crown (1957) - TV play
- The Multi-Coloured Umbrella (1958) - TV play
- Citizen of Westminster (1958) - TV play
- Blue Murder (1959) - TV play
- One Bright Day (1959) - TV play
- Bodgie (1959) - TV play
- The Strong Are Lonely (1959) - TV play
- The Life and Death of King Richard II (1960) - TV play
- Close to the Roof (1960) - TV play
- The Dock Brief (1960) - TV play
- The Square Ring (1960) - TV play
- Swamp Creatures (1960) - TV play
- Turning Point (1960) - TV play
- The Sergeant from Burralee (1961) - TV play
- The Right Thing (1963) - TV play
- Ballad for One Gun (1963) - TV play
- Thirty-One Backyards (1965) - TV play
- Headmaster (1977) (TV series)
- The Professionals (1978–83) - TV series
- Who Dares Wins (1982)
- Special Squad (1984) (TV series)
- Fortress (1985)
- C.A.T.S. Eyes (1986–87) (TV Series)
- Gentlemen and Players (1988–89) (TV Series)
