= Vega 4 (TV series) =

- Genre: science fiction
- Written by: John Warwick
- Country of origin: Australia
- Original language: English
- No. of episodes: 7

Production
- Producer: Alan Burke
- Running time: 30 mins

Original release
- Network: ABC
- Release: 7 June – 19 July 1968

Vega 4 is an Australian science fiction television series which first screened on the ABC in 1968. It was later also screened on the Seven Network. Vega 4 is a spin-off of the 1966 series The Interpretaris. The third series in the trilogy was Phoenix Five in 1970.

== Plot ==
A threat to Earth from Galaxy Five has been detected by Earth Space Control. When it is suggested that the spacecraft, the Interpretaris, should be sent on this mission, it is revealed that it is not equipped for travel to Galaxy Five. Therefore, the President orders the commissioning of an untested new spaceship the Vega 4, which is the only hope for Earth to survive.

== Cast ==
- John Faassen as Captain Wallace
- Evan Dunstan as Lieutenant Adam
- Julianna Allan as Ensign Poitier
- Edward Hepple as Zodian
- Ken Fraser as President
- Philip Jay as Professor Kendrick
- Roger Ward as Tritonian
