= Richard Meikle =

Australian actor

- Born: 10 October 1929
- Died: 2 June 1991 (aged 61); Gosford, New South Wales, Australia
- Occupation: Actor
- Spouses: Lola Edna Brooks (m. 1955); Helen Millicent Madgwick (m. 1968)
- Children: 5, including Sam Meikle

Richard Meikle (10 October 1929 – 2 June 1991) was an Australian actor who worked extensively in radio, theatre, and television (in TV movies and as a guest in serials). He also worked in England. He was the father of screenwriter and director Sam Meikle.

== Career ==
Meikle began his career as a stage actor. His first recorded role was in the Metropolitan Theatre's 1947 production of Ned Kelly. He also appeared in Shakespearean roles including Hamlet, A Midsummer Night's Dream and Twelfth Night.

In the 1950s, Meikle moved into radio acting, most prominently with Grace Gibson Productions. He landed many major roles with the company, as both an actor and an announcer. Meikle was included in Reg James' list of his favourite Grace Gibson performances, for his starring role alongside John Unicomb in the serial Becket. Meikle's ability to perform his own sound effects saw him highly sought after, as Grace Gibson Productions' budget did not cover a professional sound effects person. He would often compete for rights to do sound effects with his co-stars Ron Roberts and James Condon. He played the London-based spy "Guy Marriott" in the Grace Gibson radio series Undercover.

In 1959, Meikle was cast as "Davis" in Stanley Kramer's apocalyptic science fiction drama On the Beach, filmed in Melbourne.

1966 produced several roles for Meikle. He had the dual role of Mickey Higgens and narrator (reading the opening credits) in The Shame of Sefton Ridge, an adaptation of Hamilton Basso's novel The View from Pompey's Head. He also played Paul Kruger in Phillip Mann drama The Red Gardenia, as well as reading the end credits of a few episodes. Another major role in the 1960s was as Logan Berkeley in Ross Napier's adaptation of the novel Borrasca. Borrasca was another example of Grace Gibson using Meikle as an announcer.

The early 1970s also proved to be a busy time for Meikle, with Grace Gibson and Crawford Productions TV series. He had another actor/announcer job in the form of Ross Napier's So Help Me God in 1970, where he read the credits for each episode and played criminal Toby Laird. Meikle had starring roles in the 1971 shows I Killed Grace Random and I, Christopher Macaulay, where he played copywriter Curtis Miller and the titular character respectively.

As local television production started to become more prevalent, Meikle began to branch out in the late 1970s. He appeared in several television movies, including Harvest of Hate, where he replaced Sir Robert Helpmann in the role of vineyard owner John Camden. In 1976, Meikle had a major role as Martin Gruman in the one hour pilot episode of the television drama Bluey.

In 1982, Meikle returned to Grace Gibson Productions, joining the cast of the company's most popular serial, The Castlereagh Line, playing Jim Holly.

== Personal life ==
Meikle was the son of Leslie Meikle, an engineer, and Alma May Meikle (née Milsted). Meikle married twice, firstly in 1955 to Lola Edna Brooks, an actress, with whom he had a son. He married again in 1968, to Helen Millicent Madgwick, by whom he had another four children.

Meikle died in Gosford, New South Wales, on 2 June 1991.

== Filmography ==
=== Television ===
Year	Title	Role	Notes	Ref.
1957	A Fourth for Bridge		TV play	
1957	The Importance of Being Earnest	Algernon Moncrieff	TV play	
1957	In the Zone		TV play	
1960	ITV Play of the Week	Lindsey Stone	Episode: "The Night of the Big Heat"	
1961	No Hiding Place	Arthur Wolf	Episode: "The Long Stretch"	
1961	Whiplash	Pecos Denvers	Episode: "Episode in Bathurst"	
1961	A Night Out	Gidney	TV play	
1962	The Taming of the Shrew	Tranio	TV play	
1962	The Patriots	W. H. Moore	Miniseries	
1963	Prelude to Harvest	Captain Collins	TV play	
1965	The Affair	Donald Howard	TV play	
1965	My Brother Jack	Dud Rosevear	1 episode	
1966	Australian Playhouse	Nicholas	Episode 3: "The Air-Conditioned Author"	
1967	Contrabandits	Sam Kodiak	Episode: "Target, Smokehouse"	
1967	Love and War		Episode: "Serjeant Musgrave's Dance"	
1968	The Battlers			
1968	Hunter	Phan Lin	Episode: "Brain Storm"	
1968–1969	I've Married A Bachelor	Guru Chanderadas	2 episodes	
1969	Riptide	Alex Kolonis	Episode: "Good Friday Island"	
1969	Delta	Bill Prescott	Episode: "The Devil Take the Blue Tongue Fly"	
1969	Woobinda, Animal Doctor		Episode: "No Love for Theodore"	
1969–1973	Division 4	Gil Williamson / Ian Taylor / James Marshall	8 episodes	
1970	The Rovers	Professor Anderson	Episode: "A Present for Jenny"	
1972	Barrier Reef	Joe Francis	Episode: "The Speckled Stone Fish"	
1972	Homicide	Barrington	Episode: "From the Top"	
1972	Catwalk	Christopher Kemper	Episode: "Try Anything Twice"	
1972	The Prince and the Pauper	Voice	TV movie (animated)	
1973	The Count of Monte Cristo	Voice	TV movie (animated)	
1973	The Three Musketeers	Voice	TV movie (animated)	
1972–1976	Matlock Police	Roy 'Tiger' Donovan / Neil Thomas / Norman West	3 episodes	
1973	Certain Women	George Lindsay	6 episodes	
1976	Bluey	Martin Gruman	Episode: "The First Bloody Day"	
1976	The Young Doctors	Les Bradley	1 episode	
1976	Silent Night, Holy Night		TV movie	
1977	Dot and the Kangaroo	Jack the Farmhand (voice)	TV movie (animated); Also casting director	
1977	Glenview High	Michael Wilson	Episode: "Quiet Nights and Silent Deaths"	
1978	The Restless Years	Senator Ross Lindsay	26 episodes	
1978	Chopper Squad	George Deacon	Episode: "8:52 A.M."	
1979	Harvest of Hate	John Camden	TV movie	
1979	The Little Convict	Sergeant Bully Langton (voice)	TV movie (animated); Also casting director & production manager	
1979	Cop Shop	Frank Dobson	4 episodes	
1982–1987	A Country Practice	Fred Murray / Arthur Ryan / Jim Higgins	6 episodes	
1983	Who Killed Baby Azaria?	Coroner Galvin	TV movie	
1983	Scales of Justice	Premier Russell Cooper	Episode: "The Numbers"	
1984	The Last Bastion	General Vasey	Miniseries	
1985	The Pickwick Papers	Voice	TV movie (animated)	
1985	The Adventures of Robin Hood	Voice	TV movie (animated)	
1985	The Man in the Iron Mask	Voice	TV movie (animated)	
1985	Stock Squad	McCabe	TV movie	
1985	Robbery	Major General	TV movie	
1985	Sons and Daughters	Colonel Gerrard Bainbridge	5 episodes	
1986	Kidnapped	Voice	TV movie (animated)	
1986	The Hunchback of Notre Dame	Voice	TV movie (animated)	
1988	The Dirtwater Dynasty	Mr. J. James	Miniseries, 1 episode	
1990	Home and Away	Paramedic	1 episode	

=== Film ===
Year	Title	Role	Notes	Ref.
1958	This Land Australia		Short film	
1959	On the Beach	Davis		
1974	Moving On			
1981	Doctors and Nurses	The President		
1984	For Love or Money	Himself	Documentary film	

== Radio ==
Year	Title	Role	Notes	Ref.
1954	Starlight Theatre		Serial	
1954	The Western Trail		Serial	
1954	Fat Man		Serial	
1955	The King of Friday's Men	Owen Fenigan	Serial	
1958	Radio Cab	Scott Sullivan	Serial	
1958	Chicken	Everett	ABC play	
1959	Not to be Taken	Steven Davies (original voice)		
1960s	Pray for a Brave Heart		Serial	
1960s	The Big Fisherman		Serial	
1962	Sara Dane	Irish rebel convict		
1963	The Robe	Marcellus Gallio	Serial	
1964	Too Young to Die	Larry Gates		
1964	Pray for a Brave Heart			
1965	The Tilsit Inheritance	Jim	Serial	
1965	Becket	King Henry II	Serial	
1965	Requiem for Paul Jason	Eric Millgate	Serial	
1966	The Red Gardenia	Paul Kruger / Announcer	Serial	
1966	The Shame of Sefton Ridge	Mickey Higgens / Announcer		
1967	The Sinners of Sonoma	Robby Barrow	Serial	
1968	Borrasca	Logan Berkeley		
1968	Kinkhead	Warren Butler		
1968	Undercover	Guy Marriott		
1970	So Help Me God	Toby Laird / Announcer		
1971	I Killed Grace Random	Curtis Miller / Announcer		
1972	I, Christopher Macaulay	Christopher Macaulay	Serial	
1979	Alladyce and the Holy Virago		Serial on ABC Radio Sydney	
1979	The Great God Mogadon		Serial on ABC Radio Sydney	
1979	The Maitland and Morpeth String Quartet		Serial on ABC Radio Sydney	
1979	The Fire on the Snow		Serial on ABC Radio Sydney	
1979	Kookaburra		Serial on ABC Radio Sydney	
1982	The Castlereagh Line	Jim Holly / William Holly	Serial	
	Crisis Point	Narrator	Serial	
	The Silent Witness	Les Callaghan / End Credits	Serial	
	Step into Deep Waters	Leslie Galvin	Serial	
	Old Times	Deeley		

== Theatre ==
Year	Title	Role	Notes	Ref.
1947	Ned Kelly	Mackin	Metropolitan Theatre, Sydney	
1947	Hamlet	Laertes	Metropolitan Theatre, Sydney	
1948; 1950	A Midsummer Night's Dream	Demetreus	Metropolitan Theatre, Sydney, Killara Soldiers Memorial Hall, Sydney	
1949	Twelfth Night		Metropolitan Theatre, Sydney, Killara Soldiers Memorial Hall, Sydney	
1949	The Story of Madeleine Smith	Emile	Killara Soldiers Memorial Hall, Sydney with Kuring-gai Theatre Guild	
1949	A Marriage of Convenience		Independent Theatre, Sydney	
1950	Raymond, Lord of Milan	Ezzelin	Metropolitan Theatre, Sydney	
1951	You Never Can Tell		Metropolitan Theatre, Sydney, Independent Theatre, Sydney	
1952	Worm's Eye View		Theatre Royal, Adelaide, Savoy Theatre, Wollongong, Crystal Theatre, Broken Hill	
1953	Columbe	Julien	Independent Theatre, Sydney	
1953	Anne of the Thousand Days		Independent Theatre, Sydney	
1953	The Apple Cart		Independent Theatre, Sydney	
1953	His Excellency		Independent Theatre, Sydney	
1953	Le Bourgeois Gentilhomme		Independent Theatre, Sydney	
1954	Captain Brassbound's Conversion		Independent Theatre, Sydney	
1954–1955	Dear Charles	Walter, Denise's elder son	Comedy Theatre, Melbourne, Theatre Royal Sydney, Theatre Royal, Adelaide with J. C. Williamson's	
1956	The Boy Friend	Gendarme	Elizabethan Theatre, Sydney, Theatre Royal, Adelaide with J. C. Williamson's	
1957	Come Back, Little Sheba		Independent Theatre, Sydney	
1962	The Caretaker		Independent Theatre, Sydney	
1962	Daughter of Silence		Independent Theatre, Sydney	
1964	Overruled		St James' Hall, Sydney, Grace Brothers Auditorium, Sydney with The AETT	
1964	The Zoo Story	Gesty	Palace Theatre, Sydney with AETT & Old Tote Theatre Company	
1968	Sarah and the Sax		AMP Theatrette, Sydney with AETT & Old Tote Theatre Company	
1977	The Father	The Captain	UNSW Old Tote Parade Theatre, Sydney	
1977	Caesar and Cleopatra	Julius Caesar	Sydney Opera House with Old Tote Theatre Company	
1977	Wild Oats	Sir George	York Theatre, Sydney with Old Tote Theatre Company	
1989	Curtains		Northside Theatre, Sydney	
