= The Lotus Eaters (radio play) =

1968 Australian stage play and radio play

- Original language: English
- Written by: Patricia Hooker
- Genre: comedy-satire
- Setting: sea port in Queensland

Premiere
- Date: March 1968
- Place: Adelaide

The Lotus Eaters is a 1968 Australian stage play and radio play by Patricia Hooker. It debuted at the Adelaide Festival.

== Premise ==
The scene is a small sugar port in Queensland. The play begins with a ship in the harbor waiting to be loaded. Time is short, but Sid Brady, the head of the Cargo Dumper's Union, doesn't care — he's carving a career for himself by making trouble. His target is Harold Barker, a long-suffering Englishman, who is inclined to think that the biggest mistake he ever made was to come to Australia. Loading a ship should be easy enough you might think, but not in Port Kathleen.

== Reception ==
Leslie Rees wrote "To some over-sensitive unionists the play appeared as a provocative and unnecessary attack on cherished rights and dignities, but other viewers saw in it equally amusing gibes at arbitration, employers, strikes, union bosses, and Englishmen forced to be Australians. Once again Patricia Hooker was deep in a man’s world, with a cast of eleven males and only one female. The play spun fair verbal comedy from the legal quibbles between the parties."

The Sydney Morning Herald called it "a lively farce..." "The flaw in this farce comes from its unchanging device of frustration in a chess-like game of check and counter-check between wily union leader and panic-stricken employer while the ten burly ‘workers’ cheer from the side-lines. It becomes stale before io end but Miss Hooker has the skill to minimise this inevitable fault."

The Age called it "a piece of shabby propaganda". The Tribune called it "an embarrassing failure".

== Radio adaptation ==
The play was adapted for radio in 1969, 1970 and 1973.
