= Thirty-One Backyards =

British television play

- Written by: Alan Seymour
- Directed by: Ray Menmuir

Production
- Running time: 50 mins

Original release
- Release: 16 May 1963

Thirty One Backyards is a 1963 British television play directed and produced by Raymond Menmuir and starring Ray Barrett. It was written by Alan Seymour and was an episode of ITV Television Playhouse.

The play was by an Australian writer and done with Australian cast and director but was made in London. It was one of four plays by Australian writers bought for Australian television. It was made by Rediffusion.

== Plot ==
A young Australian writer, Larry, works out his affair with a spirited English girl, Delphine. They meet at a party. They move into a flat together that looks out into 31 backyards.

== Cast ==
- Ray Barrett as Larry
- Susan Hampshire as Delphine
- Jack Smethurst

== Reception ==
The Daily Record wrote "Ray and Susan managed to make this play zip along and fit delightfully between comedy and drama."

The Liverpool Echo wrote "it gave a distinct impression the author was preaching" but what "it lacked in subtlety it more than made up for in pace and gusto." The Daily Mirror called it "a fluffy tale of love with a message about we English." The Southern Daily Echo called it "meaningless, boring rubbish."

The play aired in Australia in 1965. The Tribune said "The play, a competent and entertaining observation on some aspects of the British character and way of life, took an amusing stab at exploding the myth that all Australian men are tall, bronzed gods. The production and direction were very good indeed."

== See also ==
- List of television plays broadcast on Australian Broadcasting Corporation (1960s)
