= Hunter (1967 TV series) =

Australian espionage adventure television series

- Genre: Adventure
- Created by: Ian Jones; Terry Stapleton
- Starring: Tony Ward; Gerard Kennedy; Nigel Lovell; Fernande Glyn; Ronald Morse; Anne Morgan
- Country of origin: Australia
- Original language: English
- No. of episodes: 65

Production
- Running time: 60 minutes
- Production company: Crawford Productions

Original release
- Network: Nine Network
- Release: 4 July 1967 – 5 March 1969

Hunter is an Australian espionage adventure television series screened by the Nine Network from Tuesday 4 July 1967 to March 1969. The series was created by Ian Jones and produced by Crawford Productions.

== Cast ==
=== Main / regular ===
- Tony Ward as John Hunter
- Gerard Kennedy as Kragg
- Nigel Lovell as Charles Blake
- Fernande Glyn as Eve Halliday (episodes 1-26)
- Anne Morgan as Julie Coleman
- Gordon Timmins as Doug Marshall
- Ronald Morse as Mr Smith (episodes 1-32)
- Rod Mullinar as Gil Martin (episodes 56-65) / Ted Cook (episode 37)
- Patricia Smith as Georgie Savage (episodes 23-24, 28-31)
- Kevin Sanders as title sequence narrator

=== Recurring / guests ===
- Jack Hume as Vargon (8 episodes)
- Alastair Duncan as Tamas Spivak / Marriott (2 episodes)
- Alwyn Kurts as Sir Benjamin Hart / Ron White (2 episodes)
- Anne Charleston as Patricia French (2 episodes)
- Anne Haddy as Jane Wilding (1 episode)
- Alexander Archdale as Dr. Wallace (6 episodes)
- Earl Francis as Jim Bettman / various other characters (6 episodes)
- Brian Moll as Hickman / Fishta (2 episodes)
- Carmen Duncan as Rosie Glow (3 episodes)
- Don Crosby as Lang / Mick Jackson (2 episodes)
- Julianna Allan as Andrea (3 episodes)
- Gerda Nicolson as Marion Tolhurst (1 episode)
- Jeanie Drynan as Anna Polanski (1 episode)
- Jill Forster as Chris Charter / Alison Bean (3 episodes)
- Keith Eden as Jan Lestrovic (1 episode)
- Kenneth Goodlet as Collis / Cardwell (3 episodes)
- Kevin Miles as Brian Clarke (1 episode)
- Lorraine Bayly as Karen Savage / Sharon Reid / Diana Mannering (3 episodes)
- Maurie Fields as Day (2 episodes)
- Max Osbiston as Foster / Mason (2 episodes)
- Norman Kaye as Captain Jansen / Max Holland / Inspector (3 episodes)
- Patsy King as Jean Gallagher (1 episode)
- Richard Meikle as Phan Lin (1 episode)
- Roger Ward as Humphrey Wilding (1 episode)
- Rowena Wallace as Sue (1 episode)
- Terry Norris as Delaney / Grant / Peter Kramer (3 episodes)
- Tom Oliver as Hans Felburg (1 episode)
- Vic Gordon as Wilson (1 episode)
- Wendy Hughes as Sue Gallagher (1 episode)
- Wendy Playfair as Mrs West (1 episode)

== Series synopsis ==
The title character, John Hunter, was an agent working for SCU3, a sub-division of the ASIO-like COSMIC (Commonwealth Office of Security & Military Intelligence Co-ordination). While it is mentioned in episodes that "Hunter" is a status level for agents (similar to the "Double-O" status of James Bond), with the title character being "Hunter 5", he gives "Hunter" as his surname both in current scenes and flashback sequences. He was played by Tony Ward.

However, he was quickly overshadowed by the show's main antagonist, Kragg, an agent employed by the Australian operation of the CUCW (Council for the Unification of the Communist World). Played by Gerard Kennedy, Kragg became the show's breakout character, with Kennedy winning a TV Week Logie Award for Best New Talent for his portrayal of the character.

SCU3 was the Melbourne-based arm of COSMIC, headed by Charles Blake (Nigel Lovell), with offices in the former National Mutual Centre building or St Kilda Road. Blake's secretary was Eve Halliday (played by Fernande Glyn), who also acted as a field agent. Halliday was replaced for the second season by the recurring character of Julie Coleman (played by Anne Morgan), with real-life police detective Gordon Timmins appearing as agent Doug Marshall (Timmins played a character of the same name in Homicide, on which he also acted as police advisor, although the two roles were not the same character).

The Australian cell of CUCW or simply the Council was overseen by Mr. Smith (Ronald Morse), with sinister overseas superiors appearing from time to time, notably the bearded Vargon (Jack Hume). Its clandestine front was an export office based in the former 'Warwillah,' an Edwardian mansion at 572 St Kilda Road.

== Production ==
Screenplays were written by Ian Jones, Terry Stapleton and Howard Griffiths, who reputedly had a background in British military intelligence before emigrating. The line producer for the majority of the show's run was Allan Trevor, who also appeared occasionally as an actor. Most episodes were directed by Ted Gregory, a longtime Crawford studio director, with Jones supervising a lean and mobile film unit.

The series became extremely popular rating in the top-ten most popular programs in Australia for 1967, and had a run of 65 one-hour episodes. It also achieved a limited number of international sales. It was produced in black and white, with interior scenes recorded on videotape in the GTV-9 Richmond studio and outdoor scenes shot on location with Arriflex synchronized sound on 16 mm film.

Compared to Australian drama series of the day, the series featured an above-average quota of location-shot action footage, explosions and stunts. It was accompanied by a sophisticated, original jazz theme, fanfare and underscore by reed player and composer Frank Smith. The Melbourne-based show filmed some episodes in Sydney and in the Snowy Mountains in New South Wales, on the Gold Coast, Queensland, in South Australia, and overseas in Singapore.

Initially stories were serialised over three and four-episode story arcs. Soon the decision was made to switch to stand-alone episodes. After episode 15 episodes largely featured a self-contained story, apart from two subsequent two-part stories. Notably, a first season arc, "The Prometheus File," was set at the high-security Woomera Rocket Range and featured actual footage of the Blue Streak launch, with the actors even allowed access to the tallest gantry for the climactic fight.

Kevin Sanders, a GTV-9 news journalist and announcer, supplied the opening narration setting up the lead character and premise over the main title sequence. While the series was in early development, President Johnson made a tickertape motorcade through Melbourne in October 1966, which was opportunistically filmed as a backdrop to establish Hunter as a special agent in the large welcome crowd at Melbourne Town Hall for inserting in the first season intro.

== Series evolution ==
As the series progressed the immense popularity of the villain Kragg presented several problems. Apart from apparently being more popular amongst viewers than the show's title character, in the stories the villain invariably had to defeat, or escape from, the ostensible hero in order to still be around for the next episode. In a concession to the character's popularity, Kragg ultimately defected to the side of good after being wounded when his girlfriend (played by Patricia Smith, later cast in Division 4) was savagely killed. Series star Tony Ward had been somewhat dissatisfied with the direction his character was taking with the increased emphasis on Kragg, and commented that the high output of episodes by this stage had outstripped the ability of the writers.

Late in the show's run and after some disagreements with the show's producers, Ward left the series to pursue movie options—"John Hunter" was executed by a firing squad in an East European country after a mission went wrong (filmed in Old Melbourne Gaol). A new lead spy (Gil Martin) was introduced, portrayed by British import Rod Mullinar, who had been trialed in a few Homicide roles. Mullinar completed eight episodes of the series before it was cancelled. Keen to retain the services of Kennedy, Crawfords decided that new police series Division 4 would be a better vehicle for his talents. They convinced the Nine Network to cancel Hunter and proceed with Division 4, which indeed emerged as a popular success. Mullinar subsequently took the titular role of a private eye in another Crawford drama series, Ryan (1973).

The complete series was rerun in Melbourne on Sunday afternoons at 4 p.m. in late 1969 to early 1970; late at nights on Wednesdays in late 1970 to early 1971; and late at night on Sunday in late 1971 to early 1972. In Sydney it was shown on Mondays at 3 p.m. starting in March 1971 and in December 1972 to January 1973 it was shown once again daily at 3 p.m.

The first season of the series was released on DVD in 2018, missing one episode. The second season has yet to be released by Crawfords.

== Home media ==
| Title | Format | Ep # | Discs | Region 4 (Australia) | Special features | Distributors |
|---|---|---|---|---|---|---|
| Hunter (Collector's Edition) | DVD | Episodes 01–04 Episodes 06–14 | 04 | December 2018 | None | Crawford Productions |
