= Sydney University Dramatic Society =

The Sydney University Dramatic Society (SUDS) is the premier body for the production of undergraduate theatre at the University of Sydney. Established formally in 1889, with performances dating back to 1883, the society is the oldest continual theatre company in Australia, and one of the oldest student theatre groups in the world. Supported by the University of Sydney Union, SUDS performs over 16 productions a year, all of which are directed, designed and performed by its members. As well as traditional theatre, SUDS has been involved in the production and staging of student written productions, experimental plays, improvised theatre, and various comedy revues.

SUDS currently operates out of the society's own production space, the Cellar Theatre, underneath the Holme Building on the Camperdown Campus of the University of Sydney. Before this plays were regularly housed in St James' Hall and the Society's own performance space on George Street, with smaller productions housed in the university's Footbridge and Wallace Theatres.

During the society's heyday SUDS was considered one of the leading production companies in Australia, attracting a range of theatrical talent and audiences beyond its student base. This popularity peaked in the postwar years of the 1950s-60s during which time many prominent actors and personalities passed through its ranks. SUDS is considered to have played a leading role in the establishment of Australian theatre, alongside breakaway group The Sydney Players, during this time.

== Alumni ==
SUDS has nurtured a number of notable alumni who have gone on to excel in the arts, most notably John Bell AO, OBE, who went on to found the Bell Shakespeare Company following his time at the University of Sydney. Other notable members have included Gough Whitlam, a future Prime Minister of Australia, who met his wife Margaret through SUDS, and personalities Germaine Greer and Clive James both of whom went on to manage the Cambridge Footlights during its golden era.

Past members and people associated with SUDS productions include:

- Neil Armfield
- John Bell
- Arthur Dignam
- Nick Enright
- Charles Firth
- John Gaden
- Virginia Gay
- Germaine Greer
- Andrew Hansen
- Robert Jarman
- Dominic Knight
- Chas Licciardello
- David Marr
- Julian Morrow
- Tommy Murphy
- Andrew O'Keefe
- Marion Potts
- Craig Reucassel
- Anne and Leo Schofield
- Andrew Tighe
- Gough Whitlam
- Margaret Whitlam
- Nigel Lovell
