= John Unicomb =

Australian actor (1928–2012)

- Born: John Robert Unicomb; 4 July 1928; Dulwich Hill, New South Wales, Australia
- Died: 13 August 2012 (aged 84)
- Occupations: Actor, stage manager
- Years active: 1936-2010
- Spouse: Fernande Glyn (divorced)

John Robert Unicomb (4 July 1928 – 13 August 2012) was an Australian actor and stage manager who had early successes in radio as a child actor and was later influential in the history of theatre in Tasmania. He was active in the industry for some 75 years. The surname has often been misspelled 'Unicombe'.

== Early life ==
Unicomb was the eldest son of Morris Britain Unicomb (born 14 July 1900) and Beatrice Mary Unicomb, née Warburton (died 11 August 1990) of Dulwich Hill, New South Wales, who encouraged the development of their sons' vocal talents.

He had early successes in elocution and recitation competitions in eisteddfods. He started an Arts course at Sydney University but abandoned his studies for a career in radio drama.

== Career ==
Unicomb began acting as a child with ABC Radio's Children's Session in 1936.

Unicomb played Terry O'Riordan in Chauvel's 1949 film Sons of Matthew, becoming friends with John Ewart, whom he knew from his days working on the ABC Children's Session.

In 1951, Unicomb had a small part in the film Captain Thunderbolt, played Oswald in a well-reviewed King Lear for John Alden and, famously, an athletic Hamlet in Robin Lovejoy's production at Sydney's Metropolitan Theatre. On the strength of his performance in Hamlet, Unicomb won a place in Ngaio Marsh's company, touring New Zealand.

Unicomb relocated to the United Kingdom, to further his acting career. Around 1956, he appeared (as ‘father’) alongside wife Fernande Glyn (as 'mother') in Dennis Driscoll's Off the Deep End, for the Colwyn Bay Repertory Theatre in Wales.

In 1958, the pair returned to Australia, where they appeared in several productions together. In mid-1959, Unicomb appeared with Glyn as part of J. C. Williamson's Shakespeare Company in a Melbourne production of The Merchant of Venice in Melbourne. The following year, they appeared in a regular radio comedy, Mr. and Mrs. – as part of Omnibus on Sydney's 2GB.

In late 1962, both Glyn and Unicomb had lead roles together, alongside David Hutcheson and Martine Messager in another J. C. Williamson’s production, a play adapted from Marcel Achard's L'Idiote, called A Shot in the Dark, a French comedy which ran for nearly four months in Sydney and Melbourne. In late 1964, the pair were again cast together in the satire, How the West Was Lost. Around 1965, Unicomb and Glyn were guest stars together on The Mavis Bramston Show. Unicomb later worked as a comedian.

Unicomb moved to Tasmania, where he worked in theatre for four decades as an actor, director and theatre manager. In 1972, he founded the Tasmanian Theatre Company in which he worked as actor, manager and executive director until 1986. He was appointed general manager of Hobart's Theatre Royal the same year, a position he held until his retirement in 1994. Unicomb continued to work as a freelance actor, publicist and manager after this time, and regularly conducted guided tours of the Theatre Royal.

Unicomb met a theatrical milestone in 2010, when he marked his 600th performance, playing the lead role of Aegeon in Shakespeare's The Comedy of Errors, as part of the inaugural Shakespeare Festival at University of Tasmania, Hobart.

An audio recording of Unicomb's theatre recollections is held by the National Library of Australia in Canberra.

== Personal life ==
Unicomb met actress Fernande Glyn when they were playing lead roles in rival Shakespearian productions in Sydney. A year later, the couple relocated to London, where they were married in their first few weeks there. Wedding guests included Leo McKern and Ralph Peterson.

The couple remained in the UK for six years, spending the first two years in London, working in stage, radio, and television. They welcomed son Michael around the end of 1953, after which time, they bought a caravan and toured England, Wales, and Scotland with theatrical groups.

Unicomb and Glyn returned to Australia in August 1958, where their second son David was born about six years after Michael. By the end of the 1960s, the couple had divorced.

Unicomb met his second wife, actress Gillian, starring opposite her in a stage production of London Assurance. Together they relocated to Tasmania.

Unicomb was involved in the protests against Australian involvement in the Vietnam War.

Unicomb died in 2012, at the age of 834 after a short battle with cancer. He was survived by his wife Gillian and three sons.

=== Morris Unicomb ===
His brother Morris James Unicomb (c. 1933 – 25 February 2006) achieved fame as a child, playing the unborn brother of Tyltyl in a radio adaptation of Maeterlinck’s The Bluebird. In 1942 he played the lead role in radio series Johnny Be Careful. and at age eleven played Pip in the serial Budge's Gang. He also featured in the premiere episode of Blue Hills and 1947 film Bush Christmas, which won praise in Europe.

=== Robin Unicomb ===
Robin Antony Unicomb (born c. 1942) was a successful juvenile entrant to numerous eisteddfods in elocution and singing, and as an adult sang bass parts from Gilbert and Sullivan.

== Filmography ==
=== Film ===
Year	Title	Role	Notes	Ref.
1949	Sons of Matthew (aka The Rugged O'Riordans)	Terry O'Riordan		
1950	Know Your Children		Short film	
1952	Captain Thunderbolt			
1969	The Intruders	Bernie		
1980	Fit as a Fiddle	Jack	Short film	
1981	Save the Lady	Minister for Transport		
1986	Departure	Minister		
2009	The Voyage That Shook the World	Old Man Darwin	Direct-to-video film	

=== Television ===
Year	Title	Role	Notes	Ref.
1957	Boyd Q.C.		1 episode	
1957	Adventure at Cow Crossing	Eric	TV movie	
1957	Hour of Mystery	Doctor	1 episode	
1957	Mister Charlesworth	The Fiddler	1 episode	
1957	Whack-O!	Mr Harbord	1 episode	
1957	The New Adventures of Charlie Chan	Tom, Detective	1 episode	
1958	O.S.S.	Nazi Officer	1 episode	
1960	The Square Ring	Ford	TV play	
1961	The Merchant of Venice	Antonio	TV play	
1961	The Outcasts	Captain H.C. Antill	Miniseries, 10 episodes	
1962	Family Album	Edward Valance	TV play	
1963	Time Out	Matthews Flinders	1 episode	
1963	The Hungry Ones	Captain Watkin Tench	Miniseries, 9 episodes	
1964	I Have Been Here Before	Oliver Farrant	TV play	
1964	The Purple Jacaranda	John Bannister	Miniseries, 10 episodes	
1964–1965	The Stranger	Istosin	2 episodes	

== Theatre ==
Year	Title	Role	Notes	Ref.
1947	Cinderella Meets a Wolf		Independent Theatre, Sydney	
1948	Julius Caesar		Theatre Royal Sydney with J. C. Williamson's	
1948	Rusty Bugles	Ollie	Independent Theatre, Sydney	
1948	Measure for Measure		Independent Theatre, Sydney	
1949	The Merry Wives of Windsor		Independent Theatre, Sydney	
1949	Romeo and Juliet		Metropolitan Theatre, Sydney	
1951	Hamlet	Hamlet	Metropolitan Theatre, Sydney	
1952–1953	Henry VI, Part III	Duke of Exeter / Lord Hastings	The Old Vic, London, Birmingham Repertory Company	
1952–1953	Henry VI, Part II	Bolingbroke, a conjuror / Lord Clifford	The Old Vic, London, Birmingham Repertory Company	
1953	Henry VI, Part I	Thomas Beaufort, Duke of Exeter, Great Uncle to the King	The Old Vic, London, Birmingham Repertory Company	
1954	The Conscience of the King	William Laud	Sheffield Playhouse with Sheffield Repertory Company	
1956	Off the Deep End	Father	Colwyn Bay Repertory Theatre, Wales	
1958	The Key of the Door	Arkwright	UK tour with Gordon Harbord	
1958	Titus Andronicus		Independent Theatre, Sydney	
1958	Alice in Wonderland		Phillip St Theatre, Sydney with William Orr Productions	
1959	The Merchant of Venice	Gratiano	Theatre Royal, Adelaide, His Majesty's Theatre, Perth, Theatre Royal Sydney with J. C. Williamson's	
1959	King Lear	Oswald	Theatre Royal, Adelaide, His Majesty's Theatre, Perth, Theatre Royal Sydney with J. C. Williamson's	
1959	The Winter's Tale	Young Shepherd	Theatre Royal, Adelaide, His Majesty's Theatre, Perth, Theatre Royal Sydney with J. C. Williamson's	
1959	A Midsummer Night's Dream		Theatre Royal, Adelaide with J. C. Williamson's	
1959	A Ride on a Broomstick		Phillip St Theatre, Sydney	
1960	Mistress Money		Phillip St Theatre, Sydney	
1962	Alice in Wonderland		Phillip St Theatre, Sydney	
1962	Once Upon a Mattress		Palace Theatre, Sydney	
1964	Overruled		St James' Hall, Sydney, Grace Brothers Auditorium, Sydney with AETT	
1964	How the West Was Lost		Neutral Bay Music Hall, Sydney	
1964	J.B.	Nickles	Independent Theatre, Sydney	
1964	Becket		Independent Theatre, Sydney	
1965	Two Plays in Rehearsal		Independent Theatre, Sydney	
1965	Village Wooing		AMP Theatrette, Sydney with Q Theatre	
1965	Private Lives		Theatre 62, Adelaide with South Australian Theatre Company	
1965	The Gallant Imposter, or She Wooed and She Would Not		Neutral Bay Music Hall, Sydney	
1966	A French Affair		Neutral Bay Music Hall, Sydney	
1966	The Dreadful Fate of HMS Revenge		Neutral Bay Music Hall, Sydney	
1966	Alice in Wonderland		Phillip Theatre, Sydney, Tivoli Theatre, Sydney	
1967	Gypsy		Menzies Theatre Restaurant, Sydney	
1968	Present Laughter		Hunter Theatre, Sydney	
1968	Private Lives		Hunter Theatre, Sydney, Palace Theatre, Sydney	
1969–1970	Canterbury Tales	Knight / King	Theatre Royal Sydney, Comedy Theatre, Melbourne, His Majesty's Theatre, Perth with J. C. Williamson's	
1971	The Bandwagon	Director	Princess Theatre, Launceston, Theatre Royal, Hobart	
1971	Ghosts	Production Manager	Theatre Royal, Hobart	
1972	Cash	Executive Producer	Theatre Royal, Hobart with Tasmanian Theatre Company	
1972	Major Barbara	Director	Theatre Royal, Hobart with Tasmanian Theatre Company	
1972	Richard II	Director	Theatre Royal, Hobart with Tasmanian Theatre Company	
1972	The Girl in the Freudian Slip	Director	Theatre Royal, Hobart, Princess Theatre, Launceston, Devonport Town Hall with Tasmanian Theatre Company	
1973	Move Over Mrs Markham	Director	Launceston, Theatre Royal, Hobart with Tasmanian Theatre Company	
1973	Sticks and Bones	Director	Launceston, Theatre Royal, Hobart with Tasmanian Theatre Company	
1973	The Philanthropist	Director	Theatre Royal, Hobart with Tasmanian Theatre Company	
1974	The Odd Couple	Administrator	Theatre Royal, Hobart with Tasmanian Theatre Company	
1975	Equus	Director	Theatre Royal, Hobart with Tasmanian Theatre Company	
1975	Fiddler on the Roof	Tevye	Theatre Royal, Hobart with Tasmanian Theatre Company	
1976	Absurd Person Singular	Producer	Theatre Royal, Hobart with Tasmanian Theatre Company	
1976	Othello	Othello	Princess Theatre, Launceston, Theatre Royal, Hobart with Tasmanian Theatre Company	
1976	Da	Director	Tasmanian tour with Tasmanian Theatre Company	
1977	The Sound of Music	Director	Theatre Royal, Hobart with Tasmanian Theatre Company	
1977	Count Dracula	Director	Theatre Royal, Hobart with Tasmanian Theatre Company	
1980	Spring Awakening	Voice of Professorial Board	Mt Nelson Theatre with Tasmanian Theatre Company	
1981	Betrayal	Director	Tasmanian tour with Tasmanian Theatre Company	
1982	The Department	Director	Tasmanian tour with Tasmanian Theatre Company	
1982	Noye's Fludde	The Voice of God	St John's Church, New Town with Tasmanian Theatre Company	
1983	Death of a Salesman	Willy Loman	Tasmanian tour with Tasmanian Theatre Company	
1985	Hotdogs	Set and/or Property Maker	Hobart with Zootango Theatre Company	
1987	Theatre Royal Grand Birthday Celebration		Theatre Royal, Hobart	
1991	Hook's Mountain	Voiceover Artist	Peacock Theatre, Hobart with Zootango Theatre Company	
1996	Deceit	Older Peter / Angleton	Peacock Theatre, Hobart with Zootango Theatre Company	
2001	Burnt Piano	Sam Beckett	Peacock Theatre, Hobart with Mainstage Theatre Company	
2001	Music and Poetry		Moorilla Estate, Berriedale	
2003	The Kid	Various	Theatre Royal, Hobart	
2004	Something to Declare		Theatre Royal, Hobart	
2010	The Comedy of Errors	Aegeon / Officer	University of Tasmania, Hobart	

== Radio ==
Year	Title	Role	Notes	Ref.
1936	Children's Session		ABC Radio	
1942	Big Sister		2UW	
1950	The Typewriter		2KY with Mercury Mobile Players	
1952	Willow Bend		2UW	
1960	Mr. and Mrs.		Omnibus on 2GB	
1961	Cattleman			
1962	Lust for Life	Vincent Van Gogh		
1963	The Robe	Demetrius		
	Becket	Becket		
	The Image of Dorinda	Robert Webster		
	The Louise Conway Story	Dave Parry		
