= Fly by Night (TV play) =

1962 Australian TV play

- Written by: G.C. Brown
- Directed by: Bill Bain
- Country of origin: Australia
- Original language: English

Production
- Running time: 60 mins
- Production company: Australian Broadcasting Commission

Original release
- Release: 27 June 1962 (live, Sydney)
- Release: 15 August 1962

Fly By Night is a 1962 Australian TV play broadcast on the ABC and filmed in London. Written expressly for television, it starred Sophie Stewart who was also in The Little Woman.

== Plot ==
In London near the Thames, Miss Tyrell, an elderly vagrant, meets a middle aged suburban housewife and her husband, Mr. and Mrs. Dexter, in a dockside cafe. Miss Tyrell prompts the Dexters to rebel against their life.

== Cast ==
- Dorothy Dunckley as Miss Tyrell
- Sophie Stewart as Mrs Dexter, suburban housewife
- Michael Duffield as her husband, Mr Dexter
- John Ewart as Taxi Driver
- Stewart Ginn
- Peter Morris
- Lou Vernon as Seamus
- James Elliott as Seaman
- Olive Walker
- Nat Levison

== Production ==
The play had originally been filmed for British TV in 1961.

== Reception ==
The Sydney Morning Herald wrote that "sensitive acting from a small but extremely competent cast triumphed... over rudimentary camera techniques to produce one of the most absorbing plays to appear on Channel 2 for a very long time.... Michael Dufficld's characterisation of the retired businessman, still haunted by youthful dreams of adventure, was a completely authentic... Dorothy Dunckley... gave an outstanding portrayal."

The Australian Women's Weekly called it "a most enjoyable TV surprise. The surprise was its standard - miles above the general standard of A.B.C. live plays in acting, production, and story. The story, described as a comedy with a difference, was not so darned comic. It was too real."

== See also ==
- List of television plays broadcast on Australian Broadcasting Corporation (1960s)
