= Walter Sullivan (actor) =

Australian actor, journalist and reviewer

- Born: 1920
- Died: 1999 (aged 78–79)
- Occupation(s): Actor, journalist, reviewer
- Years active: 1948-1997

Walter Sullivan (1920-1999) was an Australian actor, journalist and reviewer who worked extensively in radio, film, TV and theatre, over a career spanning 6 decades, he's stage and screen career spanning from 1948 and 1997.

== Select credits ==
- The Slaughter of St Teresa's Day (1960)
- Venus Observed (1960)
- The Life and Death of King Richard II (1960)
- Stormy Petrel (1960)
- Marriage Lines (1962)
- Ballad for One Gun (1963)
- A Dead Secret (1963)
- Scobie Malone (1975)
- Cop Shop
- The Prisoner of Zenda (1988, voice)
