= Bertrand (film) =

- Screenplay by: Romilly Cavan
- Directed by: Ken Hannam
- Country of origin: Australia
- Original language: English

Production
- Running time: 60 mins
- Production company: ABC

Original release
- Network: ABC
- Release: 27 May 1964

Bertrand is a 1964 Australian television film. It aired on non-commercial ABC in a 60-minute time-slot. It was written by Romilly Cavan, and produced by Ken Hannam. The film aired on 27 May 1964 in Sydney 12 August 1964 in Melbourne and on 2 September 1964 in Brisbane.

== Plot ==
Set in Sydney, the title character of the drama was a stray cat, who brings together three people, a teenager (Michael Thomas), a recluse (Ronald Morse) and an ex-suffragette (Eve Wynne).

== Cast ==
- Michael Thomas as Albert Watson
- Ronald Morse as Tracey
- Eve Wynne as Mrs Glover
- Ben Gabriel as Mr Watson
- Kit Taylor as Jacki

== Production ==
It was originally written for British television and set in Britain.

The setting was relocated to Australia for this version. The designer was Geoffrey Wedlock. His neighbour, N Jenkins, owned a cat, Tim, who was cast in the lead role. "You'd have thought he'd been around TV studios all his life," said Mrs Jenkins. "He did everything... on cue."

== Reception ==
The Sydney Morning Herald called it over long "and tedious" and felt adapting the story to Australia was a mistake.
