= Harvest of Hate =

- Written by: Gil Brearley; Wal Cherry; Michael Thornhill
- Directed by: Michael Thornhill
- Starring: Dennis Grosvenor; Kris McQuade; Leon Cosak; Richard Meikle; Michael Aitkens; John Orcsik
- Country of origin: Australia
- Original language: English

Production
- Executive producer: Matt Carroll
- Producer: Jane Scott
- Cinematography: David Sanderson
- Production company: South Australian Film Corporation
- Budget: AU$150,000 (est.)

Original release
- Release: 1978

Harvest of Hate is a 1978 Australian film made for TV about Arab terrorists operating in South Australia.

== Cast ==
- Dennis Grosvenor as Peter Scanlon
- Kris McQuade as Ruth Grant
- Michael Aitkens as David
- Richard Meikle as John Camden
- John Orcsik as Terrorist
- Leon Cosak as Arab Guard
- Moshe Kedem

== Plot ==
A wealthy winemaker sends a lawyer and a surveyor-geologist to review a property in the Simpson Desert, but in the process, they are captured by Arab terrorists who are preparing to invade a middle eastern country.

The film was made as part of a South Australian Film Corporation three picture tele-movie series alongside The Plumber (1979) and The Sound of Love (1978).

== Production ==
The film was shot over three weeks in South Australia in July to August 1977. It was directed by Michael Thornhill who said it "was a gun-for-hire job. I didn't complete the film. They re-edited and I just walked away."
