= Turn of the Road =

1959 Australian short film

Turn of the Road is a 1959 Australian short film. It ran for 30 minutes and was made to promote the Police Boys Club.

== Plot ==
A young boy (Kit Taylor) from the slums with a drunk father becomes involved with a gang of car strippers in Woolloomooloo. He finds a new life through the police boys club and goes to Camp McKay at Kurrajong.

== Cast ==
- Kit Taylor
- Grant Taylor
- Nick Tate

== Production ==
Kit Taylor was Grant Taylor's son and they had appeared together in Long John Silver. Publicity Officer for Parramatta and District Police Boys' Club, Constable Tom Sneydj, said the film was based on a real incident, adding, "This film shows how boys can become fine citizens with a little help and understanding."

== Reception ==
It screened at various boys club and in cinemas in 1959. It screened on Sydney TV in 1962 and Melbourne TV in 1964.
