= Aloha Hawaii =

Australian television variety show

- Genre: Variety
- Presented by: Harry Willis
- Country of origin: Australia
- Original language: English

Original release
- Network: ABN-2
- Release: July 8, 1958 – 1958

Aloha Hawaii is a 1958 Australian television variety show which aired fortnightly.

It started on 8 July and was hosted by a black Australian, Harry Willis. Regular guests included Johnny Wade and his Hawaiians and hula dancer Maisie Lutani.
