= Queen Versus Bent =

- Consider Your Verdict episode
- Episode no.: Season 1 Episode 81
- Original air date: 9 September 1962
- Running time: 60 mins

"Queen Versus Bent" is an episode of the Australian television series Consider Your Verdict. It is notable for featuring Aboriginal actor Harold Blair. "Queen Versus Bent" aired on 9 September 1962 in Sydney, and on 16 September 1962 in Melbourne.

== Plot ==
Tommy Bent, an Aboriginal stockman, is charged with shooting the boss's nephew Graham.

== Cast ==
- Juliana Allen as Lynne Driscoll
- Harold Blair as Tommy Bent
- David Watt as Leslie Butler
- Vernon Spencer as Graham Butler
- James Scullin as Rocky Hawkins
- Raymond Fedden as Ed Rowe
- Isobel Kuhl as Gladys Willetts
- George Fairfax as Crown prosecutor John Taylor
- Wynn Roberts as Defence counsel Robert Winter
