= Ballad for One Gun =

1963 Australian television film

- Advertisement from SMH 17 Jul 1963
- Written by: Philip Grenville Mann
- Directed by: Raymond Menmuir
- Country of origin: Australia
- Original language: English

Production
- Running time: 60 minutes
- Production company: ABC

Original release
- Network: ABC
- Release: 17 July 1963 (Sydney, Canberra, Newcastle)
- Release: 11 September 1963 (Melbourne)

Ballad for One Gun is a 1963 Australian television film about Ned Kelly broadcast on ABC.

It was originally aired 17 July 1963 in Sydney and shown at later dates in other parts of Australia. It was written by Phillip Grenville Mann. The director Ray Menmuir called it "“definitely a new approach and a new treatment of the whole Ned Kelly legend."

Australian drama was relatively rare on television at the time, although there had been a TV play called Ned Kelly (1959) produced.

== Plot ==
The story of Ned Kelly which made him out to be "a dangerous embryo dictator, murderously vindictive and swaggeringly brutal in his hour of power." John Bell played Kelly but his face was never shown, he was only heard behind a mask.

== Cast ==
- John Bell as Ned Kelly
- Walter Sullivan as Captain Standish
- Neil Fitzpatrick as Aaron Sherritt
- Colin Gorman as Joe Byrne
- Mark McManus as Dan Kelly
- John Norman as Steve Hart
- Bob McDarra as Curnow
- Gordon Glenwright
- Janice Copeland
- Janice Dinnen as Ellen Sherritt
- Laurier Lange
- Reg Livermore
- Georgie Sterling

== Production ==
The play was by Phillip Grenville Mann, who had taken over from Rex Rienits as drama editor at the ABC. Mann was an Australian who had worked in the London for six years. He sold the play to the ABC and BBC, as well as to German television. Mann said "the play is not, and does not seek to be, an exact historical record."

Raymond Menmuir made it after having been in Britain for two years. Menmuir said "It's certainly not a factual historical record. And Ned Kelly doesn't emerge as an old style hero. The play doesn't attempt to sit in judgement on the Kellys either. I suppose the basic thing is we look into Ned's motives and how he gets further into his career he loses sight of the original reasons for his grudge against the police. "

It starred John Bell who called the play "definitely a new approach and a new treatment of the whole Ned Kelly legend... We play the Kelly gang rather like a band of young hoods but the crux of the play is in the change of motivations and attitudes".

Bell said when he heard the script was by Mann, the actor thought it would be like The Patriots, and was surprised when he read the script. "It's really way out," said Bell.

Bell had just finished playing Hamlet at the Old Tote in Sydney and said there were similarities between that role and Kelly. "For instance they're both out for revenge and they both suffer from a tremendous sense of injustice." Janine Dinen and Neil Fitzpatrick, who were in the cast, had also been in Bell's production of Hamlet. Bell said before the taping that, "I'll be wearing the usual Ned Kelly headpiece but it will be cut away to show most of my face. A lot of people are worried that I haven't started growing a beard but this is one historical drama were beards aren't needed. It'll be a big shock for the traditionalists."

Sets were adapted from Sidney Nolan's paintings about Kelly.

The advertising said "Ned Kelly - a betrayed Robin Hood or a thug meeting a well deserved fate."

== Reception ==
The TV critic for Sydney Morning Herald thought there was an uneasy co-existence between the depiction of the Ned Kelly gang "as young hoodlums of today in a dream-setting" and "conventional and "Patriot" type inserts of the haughty, high-cravatted police official Captain Standish" and the "slapstick" bank holdup scene. He added that John Bell "played his role with fine command and energy, but had all too little chance to develop his subject or do it justice" and felt the play had "little to say either about Kelly or his story" and "often moved sluggishly and unconvincingly."

The Bulletin called it "ludicrous... a loud misfire".

The Sunday Sydney Morning Herald called it "a beautifully written superbly produced piece of confusion... Technically it was a magnificent achievement... [with] the brilliance of some of those American workshop dramas screened by the ABC last year. But technical brilliant is not enough. A play must still say something. And frankly I am still baffled by what author Mann had to say... It was a tricky offbeat experiment that partly came off."

== Awards ==
Mark McManus won a Best Television Performance award for his performance.
