= The Interpretaris =

Australian science-fiction television series from 1966

- Genre: Science fiction
- Starring: Stanley Walsh; Lorraine Bayly; Kit Taylor
- Country of origin: Australia
- Original language: English
- No. of episodes: 6

Production
- Producer: Kay Roberts
- Running time: 30 minutes
- Production company: Artransa Park Film Studios

Original release
- Network: ABC Television
- Release: 7 October – 11 November 1966

The Interpretaris is an Australian children's science fiction television series which first screened on the ABC Television in 1966. It was later also screened on the Seven Network. It was part of a trilogy with spin-offs Vega 4 in 1968 and Phoenix Five in 1970. The show is named for a spaceship with a multinational crew tasked with finding the home systems of captured alien life forms.

The National Film and Sound Archive holds four of the six episodes in their collection.

== Cast ==
- Stanley Walsh as Commander Alan De Breck
- Lorraine Bayly as Vera Balovna
- Kit Taylor as David Carmichael
- Ben Gabriel as Parta Beno
- Gordon Mutch as Henry, the computeroid
- Judi Farr as Alys, the computer
- Thelma Scott as Marsha
- Laurie Lange as Zaharls
- Chris Christensen as The Commander

== Episodes ==
No.	Title	Original release date
1	"Strange Assignment"	7 October 1966
2	"Golden Boy"	14 October 1966
3	"Sir Lance A Little"	4 November 1966
4	"Princess Touch And Go"	TBA
5	"Whistle, Thunder and Doom"	11 November 1966
6	"Alys, Sweet Alys"	TBA
