= The Land That Waited =

- Directed by: Gil Brealey
- Written by: Max Harris
- Produced by: Alan Morris
- Narrated by: Nigel Lovell
- Music by: John Antill
- Production company: Australian Broadcasting Corporation
- Release date: 1963
- Running time: 52 min
- Country: Australia
- Language: English

The Land That Waited is a 1963 Australian documentary film telling the story of early white settlement of Australia. It starts with the arrival of Governor Phillip and looks at the creation of a settlement at Botany Bay. It then follows the next generation further out into Australia's vast land. It tells it story through the use of contemporary etchings, paintings and drawings. A book of the same title which was drawn from the film was released in 1968, written by the film's script writer Max Harris along with Alison Forbes. The film won the 1963 Australian Film Institute award for Best Documentary.
