= The Winged Chariot =

- Genre: drama play
- Running time: 30mins
- Country of origin: Australia
- Language: English
- Written by: Patricia Hooker
- Original release: 1964

The Winged Chariot is a 1964 Australian radio play by Patricia Hooker about the death of Socrates.

Ron Haddrick played Socrates in the original production. The play was popular and was produced again in 1965 and 1967.
