= Concord of Sweet Sounds =

- Written by: Patricia Hooker
- Directed by: Henri Safran
- Country of origin: Australia
- Original language: English

Production
- Running time: 60 mins

Original release
- Release: 18 December 1963 (Sydney)
- Release: 8 January 1964 (Melbourne)
- Release: 29 January 1964 (Brisbane)

The Concord of Sweet Sounds is a 1963 Australian television play starring Stuart Wagstaff, directed by Henri Safran and written by Patricia Hooker. Henry Gilbert played a musical genius. Australian TV drama was relatively rare at the time.

== Plot ==
Pianist Robert Gehrman arrives in Sydney. Maggie is his secretary who is in love with him. He is told he may never play again. The story also involves a brilliant young musical student who wants to follow in Gerhman's footsteps but has no money, and an American conductor feels Gehrman is old fashioned.

== Cast ==
- Henry Gilbert as pianist Robert Gehrman
- Gaynor Mitchell as Maggie his secretary
- Stuart Wagstaff as Robert's American antagonist, Alexander Croyston
- Leonard Bullen as Hennessy
- Mark McManus as Bill
- Carla Cristan

== Production ==
Patricia Hooker was best known for writing radio. Henri Safran had been producing Four Corners. It was the first TV performance from Gaynor Mitchell. Henri Safran had returned from Europe several months previously but been working on Four Corners.

== Reception ==
The critic for the Sydney Morning Herald wrote that:

In the imagination of most authors who dramatise the lives of concert pianists, not much can happen before flying fingers take off on the Revolutionary Study, or soulful eyes gaze out over the Liebestraum. "Concord of Sweet Sounds... while it is centred on a concert pianist, for the most part happily avoids such effusions... It contains several portraits of typed concert-world people, but its observations, even if they are conventional, are apt and convincing. The actors were admirably chosen in a splendidly fluent production by Henri Safran. "Henry Gilbert, as a veteran concert star facing retirement, was mild but dominating, with craggy, proud head and much silver hair. Stuart Wagstaff, as his musical antagonist, the smooth and dynamic young American conductor, was perhaps made to be harsher than would be likely, but he clearly, illustrated the new order against the old. Carla Cristan found the calm determination within the starry-eyed – aspiring student, and Gaynor Mitchell conveyed the devotion and final exasperation of the faithful secretary. While this brief play did little more than give a glimpse of a group of people bound to music in various ways, it did so with refreshing competence and understanding.

The Critic for the Sun Herald said it was one of the better ABC plays - "the script was rational and believable and the production was smooth."

Hooker and director Safran later collaborated on A Season in Hell (1964).

== Radio production ==
The play was adapted for radio by hooker and performed on the ABC in 1963 and 1964. This production was broadcast on the BBC on 3 February 1965, produced by Eric John.

=== Cast ===
- Nigel Lovell as Gerhmann
- Lyndall Barbour as Maggy Carson
- Lola Brooks as Rachel Linden
- Alistair Duncan as Alexander Croyston
- Stewart Ginn as George Hennessey
