= Jonah (TV series) =

- SMH ad, 15 October 1962
- Genre: Drama
- Written by: Ross Napier; Michael Plant
- Directed by: David Cahill; Ken Hannam
- Starring: Brian James
- Country of origin: Australia
- Original language: English
- No. of episodes: 20

Production
- Producer: Harry Dearth
- Running time: 30 minutes
- Budget: £3,500 per episode

Original release
- Network: ATN-7
- Release: 15 October 1962 – 1963

Jonah is an Australian television drama series which aired for 20 episodes starting from 15 October 1962 on the Seven Network. Produced during an era when commercial television in Australia produced few dramatic series, Jonah was a period drama, and was inspired by the success of ABC's period drama mini-series like Stormy Petrel.

Eponymous actor Brian James had been the star of Stormy Petrel. The episodes still exist.

== Premise ==
The National Film and Sound Archive describes the series as a "historical drama series about Jonah Locke, a merchant trader in the early Australian colony". Jonah lived in Sydney between 1840 and 1850. He would encounter historical figures.

== Cast ==
=== Regular ===
- Brian James as Jonah Locke
- Hilary Bamberger as Ann Parry, Jonah's housekeeper
- Neil Fitzpatrick as Brett Hamilton, Jonah's nephew

=== Guests ===
- Brett Hamilton as Neil Fitzpatrick
- Brigid Lenihan as Kate Winslow
- Chris Christensen as Black Henry O'Brien
- Claire Dunn as The Maid
- Denis Doonan as Captain Westcote
- Donald Philps as Captain Duff
- Gwen Plumb as Lady Jane Franklin
- Henry Gilbert as The Reverend Dr.
- Joe McCormick
- John Faasen as Sir John Franklin
- John Fegan
- Judith Arthy as Rosa
- Julianna Allan
- Liddy Clark as Pinkey
- Lionel Pearcey as Ed Curr
- Moya O'Sullivan as Pompy
- Muriel Steinbeck as Caroline Chisolm
- Noeline Brown as Dorothea Styles
- Richard Davies as Mathew Crawford
- Robert McPhee as Monahan
- Ron Haddrick as Governor
- Steve Bisley as Cook
- Walter Pym as Wilkins

== Background ==
In March 1962 it was announced ATN would make the series with Michael Plant to be writer and story editor, Harry Dearth to produce and David Cahill to direct. By July the lead actors had been cast. It was shot at Artransa Park Studios. Michael Plant was the writer and script editor.

The episode cost around £3,500 each. They sold to the Australian networks for £1,500 an episode and then to Britain for £1,000 an episode. There were disputes with Actors Equity over how much the actors should be paid.

== Reception ==
One review called it "splendid".

The Australian Women's Weekly called it "fast, action packed entertainment".

Filmink wrote Plant "was a first-rate writer: the stories proceed logically and dramatically, scenes are focused and to the point, characters are well-rounded and their behaviour is consistent."

== Episodes ==
No.	Title	Guest stars
1	"No Time for Despair"	Hans Farkash as Count Strzelecki, Ron Haddrick as Governor Gipps, Al Thomas, Owen Weingott as Stone Polonski
Gold is discovered in 1839, written by Michael Plant
2	"The Wrong Hands"	Clement McCallin, Joe McCormick, Philip Ross
The story of Ludwig Leichardt
3	"A Ring Around a Rosa"	Muriel Steinbeck as Caroline Chisolm, Judith Artha as Rosa
The story of a young immigrant girl
4	"A Tale of Two Bees"	Colin Croft, Brigid Lenihan, John Faasen as Sir John Franklin, Gwen Plumb as Lady Jane Franklin
The story of Benjamin Boyd who dreamed of building his own city
5	"Freedom for Port Phillip"	Henry Gilbert, John Llewellyn, Lionel Pearcey, Robert McPhee
The story of John Dunmore Lang
6	"A Nest of Hornets"	Allan Tobin as Lin Fong, Derek Barnes as Captain Zouch
A clash with Chinese migrants at Lambing Flat
7	"The Hashemy"	N/A
A story about the ship The Hashemy
8	"The Man from Myall Creek"	N/A
9	"The Damned of Darlinghurst"	Al Thomas as Colonel Keck, Lyndall Barbour as Fairy Mortimer
Jonah spends time in Darlinghurst Prison on a matter of principle
10	"The Treaty of South Island"	Harry Willis as Maori chief Te Rauparaha, James Condon as William Wentworth, Ron Haddrick as Governor Gipps
The story of the formation of New Zealand
11	"Black Henry"	Brigid Lenihan, Chris Christensen, Richard Davies, Claire Dunn
A story about a man who helped fix unemployment
12	"The Marquis of Mallabimbee [sic]"	James Condon, Keith Buckley, Bill Lewis
The clash between William Wentworth and Henry Parkes
13	"The Railroader"	Wynn Roberts as Morgan, Vaughan Tracey as Jamey
Miles Morgan builds a railway in the Hunter Valley
14	"The Coal Mutiny"	Tom Farley as James Brown, Moray Powell as Commodore Styles, Noeline Brown as Dorothea Styles
a man leads a charge against the monopoly given to the Australian Agricultural Company
15	"Where is Adelaide?"	Donald Phillips as Captain Duff, John Barnard as William Light, John Faasen as Horton Depenn
A story of the planning of the city of Adelaide
16	"The Seekers"	Tanya Haylesworth as Purity Tunstall, Alan Herbert as John Tunstall
Puritans arrive in Australia on their way to New Zealand
17	"This Piece of Earth"	N/A
18	"A Plague on Both Your Houses"	Geoffrey King, Julianna Allan, Alexander Archdale, John Gregg
A romance between an emancipist's daughter and the son of an aristocratic gentleman
19	"Ship of Fame"	Denis Doonan as Captain Westcote, Moya O'Sullivan as Pompy & Donald Philps as Captain Duff
20	"The Exile"	N/A
Series Finale

== See also ==
- The Outcasts – a similar series which aired on ABC the previous year
- Autumn Affair – an earlier attempt at television drama by Seven
