= Geoff Lovell =

Australian cricketer (born 1966)

Personal information
- Full name: Geoffrey Bruce Tasman Lovell
- Born: 11 July 1966 (age 60); Sydney, New South Wales, Australia
- Batting: Right-handed
- Bowling: Right-arm medium

Domestic team information
- Years: Team
- 1991–1993: Oxford University

Career statistics
Competition	First-class	List A
Matches	26	1
Runs scored	1,061	18
Batting average	32.15	18.00
100s/50s	2/3	–/–
Top score	114	18
Balls bowled	192	0
Wickets	1	–
Bowling average	141.00	–
5 wickets in innings	–	–
10 wickets in match	–	–
Best bowling	1/13	–
Catches/stumpings	21/–	–/–
- Source: Cricinfo, 1 September 2019

Geoffrey Bruce Tasman Lovell (born 11 July 1966) is an Australian former cricketer.

Lovell was born at Sydney in July 1966. He studied at The University of Sydney, before undertaking his post-graduate studies in England at Exeter College, Oxford. While studying at Oxford, he made his debut in first-class cricket for Oxford University against Hampshire at Oxford in 1991. He played first-class cricket for Oxford until 1993, making 24 appearances. Playing as a batsman, he scored 939 runs at an average of 31.30. He made two centuries, with a high score of 144 against Cambridge University in The University Match of 1993. Lovell also made a single first-class appearance each for a combined Oxford and Cambridge Universities cricket team against the touring Pakistanis in 1992 and for the Combined Universities cricket team against the touring Australians in 1993, with him making 96 against the Pakistanis. In addition to playing first-class cricket while at Oxford, he also made a single List A one-day appearance for the Combined Universities against Hampshire in the 1993 Benson & Hedges Cup. Lovell is currently the vice-warden of St Paul's College at the University of Sydney, having held the post since 2016.
