= The Link Men =

1970 Australian television series

- Created by: Glyn Davies
- Starring: Bruce Montague; Tristan Rogers; Kevin Miles; Max Meldrum
- Country of origin: Australia
- No. of seasons: 1
- No. of episodes: 13

Production
- Producer: George Spenton-Foster
- Production company: Nine Network

Original release
- Network: Nine Network
- Release: 14 January – 7 April 1970

The Link Men is a short lived Australian television series shown in 1970 that was axed after twelve weeks.

== Synopsis ==
The series was the first drama series made in-house by the Nine Network as part of an attempt to rival the cop shows produced by Crawford Productions such as Homicide and Division 4. The Link Men starred Kevin Miles, Bruce Montague and Tristan Rogers as three detectives working in the city of Sydney.

The series was devised and produced by Glyn Davies who had created The Rat Catchers for ITV (Associated-Rediffusion Television). The director (for the pilot episode and for many of the rest of the series) was Australian film director Jonathan Dawson.

== Production ==
The show, produced by British import George Spenton-Foster, lasted for thirteen episodes. The title sequence focussing on a speeding car's wheel closely followed the template of the British Rat Catchers opening, which inspired Link Men.

The aforementioned Tristan Rogers would go on to greater fame on the American daytime serial General Hospital, where he has appeared as Robert Scorpio off and on from 1980 until his death in 2025.

== Packer-Fegan fight incident ==
John Fegan's guest starring role in an episode would have been a brief footnote in a short-lived series, but for an incident on set. Two young actors were performing or rehearsing a fight scene when Frank Packer, the owner of the Nine Network, came in. Packer, who had been a boxer in his younger days but who at the time was in his mid-sixties, declared that they were doing it wrong and demonstrated the correct technique by putting the actor playing the police officer in a headlock. Fegan, also in his sixties, had been watching from behind the camera and suggested that, since the young actor was the one who was supposed to be performing the headlock then perhaps Packer should demonstrate on him (Fegan) so the young actor could watch. Packer got Fegan in the same headlock but Fegan, who had also been a boxer in his younger days and did his own stunts, got the better of him and Packer ended up on the ground.

According to an article about the event in the Sydney Morning Herald, Packer's hearing aid came flying out and Fegan lashed out and crushed it with his foot. Packer insisted that Fegan be fired on the spot. Upon being advised that Fegan was performing a single episode guest role only, Packer's response was reportedly "Well, sack him when he's finished".
