= Consider Your Verdict =

Television series

- Genre: Legal drama
- Country of origin: Australia
- Original language: English
- No. of seasons: 4
- No. of episodes: 163

Production
- Running time: 60 minutes
- Production company: Crawford Productions

Original release
- Network: Seven Network
- Release: February 1961 – June 1964

Consider Your Verdict is an Australian television series made by Crawford Productions for the Seven Network originally screening from February 1961 through to June 1964. It was based on a radio series with the same name broadcast on 3DB in Melbourne from 1958 to 1960.

== Production ==
The television series was recorded at the HSV-7 Fitzroy Tele-theatre in Melbourne. There were 163 one-hour episodes. The series was also popular in New Zealand.

== Synopsis ==
The series made use of a revolving cast to portray various court cases. The actors were given the details of a given case and instructed to improvise their performances to give the series a more authentic, immediate feel.

== Cast ==
- Terence Donovan as Keith Upton (1961–1963)
- Anne Charleston (1962/1964, 2 episodes)
- Anne Haddy as Frances Naughton (1962, 1 episode)
- Annette Andre as The Other Woman (1961, 1 episode)
- Ben Gabriel (1964, 1 episode)
- David Watt as Leslie Butler (1962, 1 episode)
- Denys Burrows (1962)
- Don Crosby as Michael Nelson (2 episodes)
- Edward Howell as Costella (1963, 2 episodes)
- Elspeth Ballantyne as Cynthia Martin (1 episode)
- George Fairfax as Crown Prosecutor John Taylor (1962, 1 episode)
- George Whaley as Don Fraser / Stanley Naughton (1962–1964, 3 episodes)
- Harold Blair as Tommy Bent (1962, 1 episode)
- Ian Turpie (1964, 1 episode)
- Isobel Kuhl as Gladys Willetts (1962, 1 episode)
- James Elliott (1962, 1 episode)
- James Scullin as Rocky Hawkins (1962, 1 episode)
- Joe McCormick (1962)
- John Fegan as Owen Bresley (1962, 1 episode)
- John Frawley (1 episode)
- Juliana Allen as Lynne Driscoll (1962, 1 episode)
- Kit Taylor (1964)
- Leonard Teale (1961–1964)
- Liz Harris as Kath Hutchins (1962, 1 episode)
- Lyndel Rowe as Helen Humphries (1964, 1 episode)
- Maggie Millar as Lydia Durant (1962, 1 episode)
- Mark Edwards
- Marion Edward as Myra Fuller (1963, 1 episode)
- Max Osbiston as Kevin Tressell (1962, 1 episode)
- Max Phipps (1964, 1 episode)
- Melissa Jaffer (1961, 1 episode)
- Nigel Lovell (1962)
- Raymond Fedden as Ed Rowe (1962, 1 episode)
- Reg Gorman as Reg Fraser (1964/1966, 2 episodes)
- Robert Jewell as Dave Betts (1962/1963, 2 episodes)
- Sheila Florance as Jocelyn Matthews / Laura Radford (1962/1963, 2 episodes)
- Stewart Ginn as Robert Wilkins (1962, 1 episode)
- Terry McDermott as Det. Sgt. Bronson / William Draper (1962/1964, 3 episodes)
- Terry Norris as Crown Prosecutor (1963/1964, 8 episodes)
- Tom Oliver (1964)
- Tommy Dysart as Jack McLean (1963, 1 episode)
- Vernon Spencer as Graham Butler (1962, 1 episode)
- Walter Pym as Julius Armstrong (1964, 1 episode)
- Wynn Roberts as Defence Counsel Robert Winter (1962, 1 episode)

== Notable episodes ==
- "Queen Versus Bent" starring Harold Blair

== Awards ==
Award nominations for Consider Your Verdict
Year	Award	Category	Nominee(s)	Result	Ref.
1962	Logie Awards	Best Drama Series	Consider Your Verdict	Won	
