= The Rose and Crown (film) =

1956 television play directed by Raymond Menmuir

- Genre: Drama
- Based on: play by J.B. Priestley
- Directed by: Raymond Menmuir
- Starring: Edward Howell , Ethel Lang
- Country of origin: Australia
- Original language: English

Production
- Production company: ABC

Original release
- Network: ABC
- Release: 20 November 1956 (Sydney)

The Rose and Crown is an ABC produced 1956 Australian black-and-white television play, written by J.B. Priestly and director by Raymond Menmuir

== Plot ==
The Rose and Crown (the play's titlo) is a London pub. Five regulars are confronted one evening by an unusual request from a stranger, the personification of death.

== Production and cast ==
Priestley had written the piece specifically for television.It was broadcast live in Sydney.

=== Cast ===
- Edward Howell
- Ethel Lang as Ma Pack
- Lou Vernon
- David Butler as Harry

== 1963 Perth Version ==
The Rose and Crown
- Based on: play by J.B. Priestley
- Directed by: Bill Eldridge
- Country of origin: Australia
- Original language: English

Production
- Running time: 30 mins
- Production company: ABC

Original release
- Network: ABC
- Release: 9 September 1963 (Melbourne, taped); 9 October 1963 (Sydney, taped)

A version of the play was performed in Perth in 1963, the first television drama made in that city. It was broadcast in Melbourne on 9 September 1963.

The producer was Bill Eldridge who described the play as "something between the kitchen sink and the twilight zone, one of Priestley's 'time' plays concerned with the reaction of ordinary people to an extraordinary situation."

=== Cast ===
- Nita Pannell as the hard drinking widow Mrs Reed
- Michael Laurence as Percy Randle, newlywed
- Jan Shier as Ivy Randle, newlywed
- Chris Pendlebury as Ma Peck
- Ron Graham as Harry Tully
- Peter Collingwood as the plumber
- Paul Nayton as the mysterious stranger

== See also ==
- List of live television plays broadcast on Australian Broadcasting Corporation (1950s)
