= Harry Willis (entertainer) =

Australian musician

Harry Willis was an Australian musician. He was of Jamaican descent.

He hosted a variety show on TV Aloha Hawaii (1958) and one on radio Harry Willis Entertains (1957). He also did some acting and sang the Calypso theme song for Long John Silver.

== Acting appearances ==
- Long John Silver (1954)
- Jonah (1962)
