= Nat Levison =

British actor

Nat Levison was a British actor. He worked for the BBC in London then moved to Australia where he worked on stage, radio, television and film.

== Select credits ==
- Pardon Miss Westcott (1959)
- The Slaughter of St Teresa's Day (1960)
- Inn of the Damned (1975)
