= Tony Ward (Australian actor) =

Australian actor

- Born: Anthony John Ward; 1924; Sydney, New South Wales, Australia
- Died: 9 May 2006 (aged 82); Lady Davidson Hospital, Turramurra, New South Wales
- Occupations: Actor; director; producer; television journalist
- Known for: Reporter on "Seven Days" ad A Current Affair

Anthony John "Tony" Ward (1924 – 9 May 2006) was an Australian television actor, director and producer and journalist. He is regarded as Australian television's original action star, on Hunter, and was an inaugural reporter on two national current affairs programs, Seven Days and A Current Affair.

== Early life ==
Anthony John Ward was born in Sydney. His father was a public servant. He was educated at a Catholic primary school before going to Parramatta Marist High School, and then became a trainee radiographer at Lewisham Hospital in 1942.

== Career ==
=== Early career in theatre ===
After World War II, he developed an interest in theatre and acted in and directed productions for several Australian and New Zealand companies, including J. C. Williamson and Garnet H. Carroll. He appeared with actors such as Robert Morley, Emlyn Williams, John McCallum, and Googie Withers.

=== Television ===
Ward realised the potential of television and joined Channel 9 in Adelaide soon after television began there in 1959. He worked as a producer and director, and also appeared as a newsreader and in advertisements. He became the first television reporter for Channel 7's Seven Days program and then joined Bill Peach on Channel 10's Telescope current affairs program.

In 1966, Crawford Productions chose him for the title role of Hunter, their new James Bond-style action series. He said of this role: "Hunter was a project which fired my imagination. I had no doubts about giving up a good career in current affairs for an opportunity like this – it was Heaven sent." He starred opposite Gerard Kennedy who played his arch enemy. The series rated highly and he travelled around Australia and overseas on location, performing many of his own stunts. He left the series after disagreements with Crawfords, particularly over the quality of the later scripts. He said, "The firm has shown initiative, courage and ambition and has made a valiant effort ... But 39 episodes of Hunter this year was far too ambitious. This outstripped the ability of the scriptwriters."

He returned to current affairs, becoming the first reporter on Mike Willesee's A Current Affair program in 1971. He is recognised as the person who discovered Australian comedian and actor Paul Hogan. Willisee was looking for a comedian to do a weekly commentary on events, and Ward suggested Hogan having seen him on the New Faces television show. Ward auditioned Hogan by interviewing him on Sydney Harbour Bridge where he worked as a rigger. Ward was the only original reporter still on A Current Affair when it was cancelled in 1978. He played himself, as an A Current Affairs reporter, in the 1981 film Captives of Care.

Ward appeared in other television series such as Sons and Daughters, Skippy, The Long Arm and Dynasty. He reported for ABC's Nationwide and made documentaries for SBS Television, and also appeared in television commercials, including for Ardath cigarettes and car insurance.

== Interests ==
Ward had a number of other interests including cars and trains. He was a member of the Rolls-Royce Bentley Owners Club, and he took thousands of feet of film and videos of steam train trips in Australia and overseas. He had a banana plantation in Coffs Harbour, New South Wales, and ran an antique print gallery in Sydney's Woollahra, New South Wales. He also cultivated prize-winning roses.

== Filmography ==
Year	Title	Role	Type
	Seven Days	Reporter	TV series
	Telescope	Reporter	Current affairs TV series
1967-69	Hunter	John Hunter	TV series
1971-78	A Current Affair	Reporter	Current affairs TV series
	Sons and Daughters		TV series
	Skippy		TV series
	Riptide		TV series
1970	The Long Arm		TV series
1970-71	Dynasty	Nigel Dayton	TV series
	Nationwide	Reporter	TV series
