= Tasmanian Theatre Company =

The Tasmanian Theatre Company is a theatre company based in Hobart, a city in the Australian state of Tasmania.
