= Cecil Fraser =

Australian pianist and composer

Cecil William Fraser (c. 1892 – 24 May 1957) was a pianist and composer, best known for his work with the Australian Broadcasting Commission as leader of the ABC Dance Band and as composer with ABC Federal Productions.

== History ==
Fraser was born in Ballarat, son of a tobacconist. He grew up in a family with no particular interest in music, but learned to play the piano by ear, though much credit was due to Miss Howarth, his teacher. His posture and finger action were such that visiting virtuoso Percy Grainger said of the 15-year-old that he had "no faults to correct" and advised his immediate departure for London and the masters of Germany. This was not possible: even with a scholarship, training of this order was beyond the means of all but the wealthiest of families. He was successful in the South Street Competitions and when he was placed second, his relegation was generally regarded as outrageous. A concert was organised for 1 September 1909 at Her Majesty's Theatre to raise funds for his musical education. Entertainers who volunteered their services included Rev. S. J. Hoban (a fine singer) and Fraser himself. Mayors of the two Ballarats, Richard Pearse and Abraham Levy, were organisers. The proceeds were to be devoted to sending Fraser to England, where Percy Granger would give him free tuition. The expected full house did not eventuate and there was no repeat concert.

His later schooling was at Victoria College, Ballarat. (Note: Victoria College was founded on Grenville Street, later Albert St., Ballarat in 1888, Doveton St. in 1889; Dana and Armstrong streets in 1894, and South St. in 1899; headmaster was D. V?N? McLean, who suffered the loss of his daughter, brother, and wife, within the space of five years, and his home was destroyed by fire in 1904. Nothing further has been found.) 1910–1912.

He dreamed of life as a concert pianist, but even in the early years of the 20th-century, this was unrealistic for most who had no private income. From 1926 to 1928 he conducted orchestras in Hoyt's (Note: Fraser was then billed as "Cecil W. Fraser", but no meaning for the initial has been found. He was always "Cecil Fraser" at the ABC. A small number of musical works by Cecil W. Fraser were catalogued by the National Library of Australia and many more in the Australian Music Centre archive.) picture theatres, then in 1929, just as talkies were starting to take over, he landed a job with the original Australian Broadcasting Company as accompanist and orchestral pianist with 3LO. In the days before high quality recordings, broadcast radio consisted mostly of live performances, so work was plentiful for capable performers.

In 1930 the Australian Broadcasting Company and other "A class" stations were taken over by the Australian Government and rebuilt as the Australian Broadcasting Commission, and Fraser was called on to form the ABC Dance Band. He scoured the dance halls from Melbourne to Sydney for entertainers suitable for radio; among his "finds" were Dick Bentley, Marjorie Stedeford and Alice Smith. Bentley was a remarkably talented individual: a saxophone player who between numbers entertained the patrons with humorous songs and impersonations of popular artists such as Bing Crosby. Fraser had difficulties persuading Bentley's father that employment as an entertainer was not only remunerative but respectable and dependable. Eventually Bentley and Stedeford left the ABC for the brighter lights of the BBC and only Stedeford returned.

Fraser was a talented tunesmith, and became an important member of the ABC's Federal Productions staff, composing around 200 songs a year, in conjunction with orchestrator and arranger Harry Cross, and music writer Alf Lawrence.

He wrote the music for

- The Disappointed Dumpling a Xmas pantomime by Ruth Park and D'Arcy Niland
- Once Upon a Time: a pantomime by Joy Hollyer, and a great number of other works with Hollyer
- Way down south : from the Chronicles of Clipper and Brown : book and lyrics by John Macleod
- Paradox regained, or, The adventures of Frederic: a comedietta to annoy Savoyards by Mark Makeham
- Gautama Buddha, aka The Love of Gotama by Ray Mathew

It is likely he is the Cecil William Fraser mentioned in the Sydney Morning Herald death notices as dying at Sylvania, New South Wales aged 65 on 24 May 1957.

== Works ==
The National Library of Australia carries copies of a great number of his works, most of which were performed once only, or as the theme for a short-lived radio serial. An exception is "Argonauts – row" to words by Ida Osbourne, which, recorded by the male members of the ABC Wireless Singers, was played twice nightly, five days a week for around forty years, introducing the Argonauts Club, and the chorus repeated as the outro.

Fifty mighty Argonauts, bending to the oars
Tonight will go adventuring to yet uncharted shores
Fifty young adventurers today set forth and so
We cry with Jason, 'Man the boats and row! Row! Row!'
Row! Row! Merry oarsmen row!
That dangers lie ahead we know, we know.
But bend with all you might
As you sail into the night
And wrong will bow to right
'Jason' cry, adventure know
Argonauts row! Row! Row!

Fraser was appointed "Argo 9" in recognition of this contribution.
