= Hepworth =

Hepworth may refer to:

== Places ==
- Hepworth, Suffolk
- Hepworth, West Yorkshire (in Kirklees, near Huddersfield)
- Hepworth, Ontario, Canada

== People ==
- Dame Barbara Hepworth (1903–1975), British sculptor and artist
- Cecil Hepworth (1874–1953), British film director, producer and scriptwriter
- David Hepworth (born 1950), British music journalist
- David Hepworth (racing driver) (1939–1992), British racing car driver
- Dorothy Hepworth (1898–1978), British painter and associate of Patricia Preece
- James Hepworth (born 1975), British professional golfer
- Jem Hepworth (born 2000), British racing driver
- John Hepworth (born 1944), Australian Archbishop and Primate of the Traditional Anglican Communion
- John Hepworth (writer) (1921–1995), Australian left-wing author and journalist
- Joseph Hepworth (tailor) (1834–1911), founder of Joseph Hepworth & Son, clothing manufacturers, now Next plc
- Joseph Hepworth (politician) (c. 1876–1945), British Conservative Party politician
- Lorne Hepworth (born 1947), Canadian farmer, veterinarian and former political figure in Saskatchewan
- Philip Hepworth (1888–1963), British architect
- Sally Hepworth (born 1980), Australian writer of The Secrets of Midwives
- Tom Stanley Hepworth (1916–1985), Australian teacher, author, and editor
- Valerie Hepworth, British charitable trustee of the Yorkshire Gardens Trust

== Other uses ==
- Hepworth Limited, British manufacturing company acquired by Vaillant Group in 2000
- Hepworth Pictures, British film production company founded by Cecil Hepworth
- Hepworth United L.F.C., women's football club based in Hepworth, West Yorkshire, England
- The Hepworth Wakefield, art gallery in West Yorkshire, England
