= Ida Elizabeth Osbourne =

Australian actress and radio broadcaster

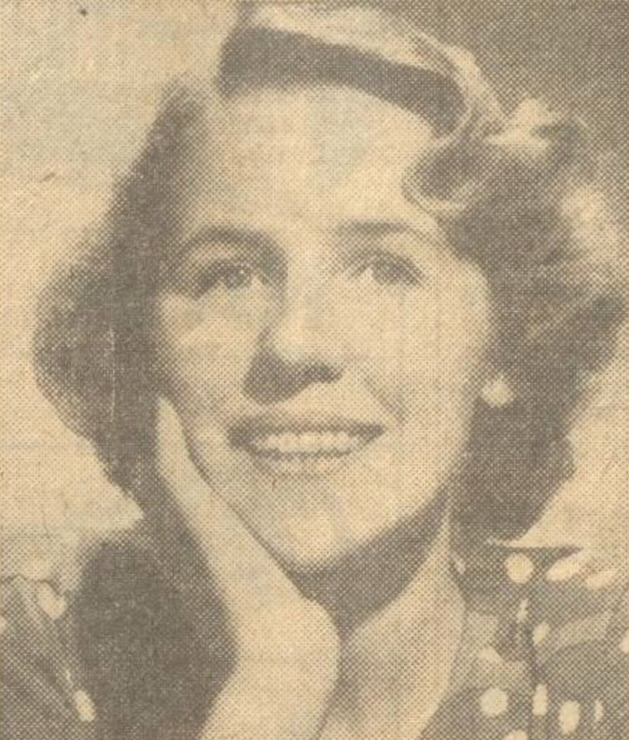
- Osbourne in 1947
- Born: 29 August 1916
- Died: 30 October 2014 (aged 98)
- Known for: Australian actor and broadcaster

Ida Elizabeth Lea MBE (29 August 1916 – 30 October 2014), professionally known as "Elizabeth" Osbourne and Ida Elizabeth Jenkins, was an Australian actor and broadcaster, best known as the co-founder of the Australian Broadcasting Commission's long-running children's radio program the Argonauts Club.

== Early career ==
Osbourne was born in Brighton, Victoria, the only daughter of Mr and Mrs W. L. Osbourne and educated at Firbank Grammar School. As a young girl she studied elocution with Ruth Conabere, sister of actor Syd Conabere (1918-2008), making successful entries in "South Street Competitions" at Ballarat, Victoria from 1929 to 1935. It was at the 1934 Melbourne Elocutionary Championships that she was spotted by ABC drama producer Frank Clewlow, who was acting adjudicator, and invited to act in radio plays.

Her first major part was as Juliet opposite Harry Traynor's Romeo. Over the next two years she played most of Shakespeare's younger women. In 1938 she started at 3LO hosting the Victorian Children's Program as "Elizabeth". In 1939 ABC General Manager Charles Moses decided to amalgamate all children's programs emanating from Sydney. Frank Clewlow, by now in Sydney himself, made sure she was appointed to head it. At first she was reluctant, as it was only a one-year contract and she was keen to visit Britain. After being promised an introduction to the BBC at the end of the year, she agreed.

=== Acting roles ===
Time and her contract allowed her to continue to act starring parts in:

Saint Joan by George Bernard Shaw (1939)
Romeo and Juliet again, with Nigel Lovell playing Romeo and Peter Finch as Mercutio
Martine (adapted for radio by Max Afford) with Neva Carr Glyn and John Tate
Alcestis of Euripides, produced by Lawrence H. Cecil with Peter Finch
Night Must Fall with Lloyd Lamble and Winifred Green
the premiere of The Fire on the Snow as Narrator with Frank Harvey as Robert Falcon Scott (1941)
The Fortunes of Richard Mahony (adapted for radio by Frank Harvey) with Howard Craven (1950).

== The Argonauts Club ==
Osbourne developed a new segment for the Children's Session that was to go down in Australian radio history: The Argonauts Club. The idea and much of the format had been formulated by Nina Murdoch, but hers was the wording on the membership certificate and the words for the opening and closing themes for both the Children's Session and the Argonauts Club, the latter to music by Cecil Fraser. And as "Elizabeth", she compered (later with co-comperes "Mac" (Atholl Fleming) and "Joe" (Albert Collins). She enlisted Ruth Park to write a dramatised series The Wide-Awake Bunyip, and played "Mouse" to Joe's Bunyip. This was later developed by Park into The Muddle-Headed Wombat radio series and books for children.

She cajoled leading writers, musicians, adventurers, sportsmen and artists into appearing on the show. She did not want anything but the best for 'her' children.

In 1946 she spent some time on a scholarship in London with the BBC to study children's programs in the UK. She remembered BBC productions as highly polished but inward-looking and ossified in the 1930s, as compared with her bright and innovative Australian program. In 1949 she married piano accompanist and organist Idwal Jenkins and, as a married woman, she was obliged under Public Service regulations to quit her post with the ABC. Her husband died two years later on 24 April 1951.

== Later career and honours ==
Osbourne was to return to ABC radio in 1953 as (now widowed) Ida Elizabeth Jenkins, presenting the ABC Women's Session until 1960. She was selected as a national commentator for the high-profile 1954 Royal Visit. She returned again to run a more personal (and at times controversial) program At Home with Ida Elizabeth Jenkins. She married again, and as Ida Elizabeth Lea was appointed a Member of the Order of the British Empire (MBE) in 1977.

She died in Sydney on 30 October 2014, aged 98.

== Bibliography ==
- Down in the Gully (three part song) music by Lindley Evans, Allan & Co., Melbourne c1949.
- Song of the Gum Tree (three part song) music by Lindley Evans, Chappell & Co., Sydney c1962.
