= G. K. Saunders =

English born, Australian writer

George Kenneth Saunders (1910–2005), also known as Ken Saunders, was a New Zealand writer, born in England, who had a substantial career in Australia.

== Career ==
After leaving Canterbury University, he secured a job writing scripts for radio 3ZD Christchurch.

Hoping to expand his horizons, he emigrated to Australia in August 1939 with his wife Mona.

Introduced by Peter Finch to ABC Federal Controller of Productions Frank Clewlow, who was recruiting staff for the newly reconstituted Argonauts Club and its companion program "The Children's Session", he was immediately put to work developing the on-air characters of 'Mac', 'Joe' and 'Elizabeth', and concocting humorous vignettes to brighten up the show.

He was also writing scripts for the Macquarie Network's Lux Radio Theatre, but with Australia's entry into World War II, he was recruited into the CSIRO, leaving only Sundays for him to develop scripts for the ABC. Mona handled his correspondence as well as scripts and quizzes for the Argosy and Brains Trust, weekend programs associated with the Argonauts.

After the War, he was able to devote more attention to stories for the Children's Hour. The Moon Flower and The First Planet, science fiction serials aired in 1953, were so successful he went on to write a dozen more; all highly speculative yet incorporating important scientific principles. The Stranger was sold overseas as a radio serial and also published as a novel.

Around 1957 he and Mona moved to England to gain experience writing for television, but kept up his commitments with the ABC by writing a serial The Nomads about a family caravanning about Europe. In the end it ran for 400 episodes. It was not without its detractors, however; in 1960 the politician Sir Wilfrid Kent Hughes saw the story as subtle Communist propaganda and made a vitriolic speech to the Ballarat Young Liberals to that effect.

Mona Saunders (née Beri) (1910–1994) wrote their joint autobiography Lucky Couple, published in 1998.

== Screen ==
- The Stranger 1964-65 ABCTV series (12 × 30min episodes)
- Wandjina! 1966 ABCTV series (7 × 30min episodes)

== Publications ==
- ABC Children's Hour Annuals 1956 - Educational Press for ABC, Sydney 1956 -
- The Stranger Whitcombe & Tombs, Sydney 1978 ISBN 0-7233-5304-2
- The Forest Rangers Whitcoulls, Christchurch New Zealand 1979 ISBN 0-7233-5309-3
- Maggie Jackson's Kid Aboriginal Studies Press, Canberra 1998 ISBN 0-85575-318-8
- Lucky Couple (Mona Saunders and Ken Saunders), The Caxton Press 1998 ISBN 0-908563-79-5

== Sources ==
- The Golden Age of the Argonauts Rob Johnson, Hodder & Stoughton 1997 ISBN 0-7336-0528-1
