= Argonauts Club =

Australian children's radio show (1933–1972)

The Argonauts Club was an Australian children's radio program, first broadcast in 1933 on ABC Radio Melbourne. Its format was devised by Nina Murdoch who had run the station's Children's Hour as "Pat". The show was discontinued in 1934 when Nina moved to Adelaide. The format was revived on 7 January 1941 as a segment of ABC's Children's Session and broadcast nationally except in Western Australia where the two hour time difference made a local production more attractive. From 6 September 1954 it was called the Children's Hour, running from 5 to 6pm. It became one of the ABC's most popular programs, running six days a week for 28 years until October 1969, when it was broadcast only on Sundays and was finally discontinued in 1972.

== The Children's Session ==
Following a decision of ABC General Manager (later Sir) Charles Moses, the Children's Session was instituted as a national program by the ABC in 1939 by Frank D Clewlow who was then Controller of Productions (i.e. director of drama and light entertainment). His protegee Ida Elizabeth Osbourne was appointed as its first presenter, as "Elizabeth". When she married in 1952, and was forced to leave as was then Public Service policy, the position was taken by "Nan" (Margaret Dalton).

The Children's Session was co-hosted from 1940 by London-born Scot Atholl Fleming, as "Mac" or "Tavish McTavish". His most durable co-presenters were the painter Albert Collins ("Joe"), then after his death the actor John Ewart, called "Jimmy" or "Little Jimmy Hawkins". The fourth member of the 'on-air' team was always female, again having an 'on-air' pseudonym. Some, perhaps most, are listed below.

=== Theme music ===
The Children's Session opened with the theme song by the Jim Davidson Dance Band, written by Elizabeth Osbourne with music by Wally Portingale:

Come, Old Mother Hubbard and Jack and Jill

And Tom the Piper's son
Leave your cupboard forget your spill
We're going to have some fun
The wireless says to hurry and run
To leave your games and toys;
The wireless says the time has come
For all the girls and boys.
So come with a hop, a skip and a run,

It's time for the Session, it's time for the fun."

and the team would introduce themselves with some light-hearted banter in keeping with their 'on-air' personas, followed by entertainment arranged roughly in order of audience age.

== The Muddle-Headed Wombat ==
The first segment for most of the show's history was a dramatised series by Ruth Park, originally The Wideawake Bunyip, with "Joe" Albert Collins in the title role. When he died, in 1951, Ruth changed the title to The Muddle-Headed Wombat, with Leonard Teale the first to play the part. When Leonard left, John Ewart "Jimmy" made it his for the next 20 years. The part of his friend "Mouse" in both incarnations was played by the current female co-presenter. When John Appleton was made Supervisor of Children's Programs and keen to be involved, a part "Tabby Cat" was created for him. The popularity of the series led Ruth Park to write her series of Muddle-Headed Wombat books in the 1960s.

== Entertainment ==
The remainder of the 'session' was given over to a variety of entertainments depending on the day of the week: "singos" (singalongs), stories or skits by the team in their studio personas, written by Atholl Fleming or G. K. Saunders involving perhaps a confrontation with the studio supervisor 'Stewed Soup' or discovery of a secret passage from the studio.

On Tuesdays, "Orpheus" (baritone Harold Williams) would sing a segment from opera, a ballad like The Golden Vanity or Up from Somerset or fun song such as "One Fish Ball" or "The Green-eyed Dragon with Thirteen Tails" Harold had perfect diction and wide range of expression, so children clearly heard what he was singing about.

The finale was a serialised book dramatisation, usually by an Australian author such as Ivan Southall. This included dramatised versions of Southall's early semi-autobiographical war novel Simon Black in Coastal Command, telling the exploits and hardships of the RAAF crews of Short 'Sunderland' flying boats, patrolling the Bay of Biscay and the Western Approaches, hunting German u-boats, and Southall's sequel science fiction novel Simon Black in Antarctica, in which Simon Black and his team flew a futuristic jet-rocket hybrid to a hidden valley in Antarctica, warmed by geothermal springs, where a remnant community of Neanderthal people was discovered. An early success was Budge (later and better known as Budge's Gang) with actors Ron Rousel (as "Budge"), Rodney Jacobs (as "Tubby"), Peter Dunstan or David Stout (as "Snick"), Patricia Crocker (as "Dolly") and Queenie Ashton (as Budge's mother). John Meillon was a later addition to the gang, and Morris Unicomb is also known to have taken part. The show, scripted by John MacLeod, was the basis of a series of illustrated books published by the ABC. G K Saunders' The Moonflower and The Nomads and Coral Lansbury's first published play The Red Mountain were written for the Children's Session.

The program ended with the closing theme (again composed by Elizabeth and Wally Portingale):

A jolly good night to you and you and you and you and you
The time has come to greet the end, the session now is through
The thought is old, is old, is old but the wish tonight is new –
A jolly good night to every one
A jolly good night to every one
A jolly good night to all especially you :And you and you and you ... and you.

== Culture ==
On different days, experts would talk about their specialties, particularly in relation to Argonauts' contributions:

Monday: Alan Colefax ("Tom the Naturalist") on nature and wildlife
Tuesday: Albert Collins, later Jeffrey Smart, as "Phidias" on art and painting
Wednesday: A. D. Hope ("Antony Inkwell") or Leslie Luscombe ("Argus") or John Gunn ("Icarus") on writing and literature
Thursday: Lindley Evans ("Mr Melody Man"), introduced by a few bars of Anatoly Lyadov's Musical Snuffbox, played and spoke on music performance and composition.

Guests on his segment included basso Alexander Kipnis, oboist Léon Goossens, singer Joan Hammond, pianist Geoffrey Parsons, conductor Richard Bonynge, French horn virtuoso Barry Tuckwell, violinist Patricia Tuckwell (sister of Barry) and conductor-composer Malcolm Williamson. Several of these were Argonauts in their younger days.

Friday was The Argosy, entirely devoted to members' contributions selected from the many thousands that might have arrived in the previous month, usually on a particular theme.
Saturday featured Argonaut Charades when the three-syllable word and the skits leading to its solution were outlined by club members and played by professional actors

== The Argonauts ==
The Argonauts Club was open to Australian boys and girls aged from 7 to 17. It proved hugely popular with young Australians: by 1950 there were over 50,000 members, with 10,000 new members joining each year through the 1950s (national membership reached 43,000 in 1953). Applications for membership (and subsequent contributions) were made by post. The new member received an enamelled badge and handsome membership certificate with the Pledge (brought over from 1931):

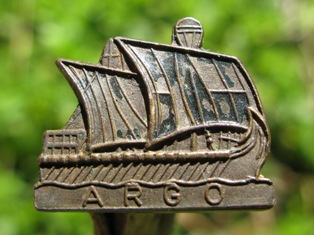
Argonauts' membership badge

Before the sun and night and the blue sea, I vow
To stand faithfully by all that is brave and beautiful;
To seek adventure and having discovered aught of wonder, or delight, of merriment or loveliness,
To share it freely with my comrades, the Band of Happy Rowers.

and the new member's allocated pseudonym (Ship name and number) were sent out to the new member. With no indication given of age, sex or origin, the only comparisons that could be made were between contributions; the members' only competitors were themselves.

A card system held the member's real name and address and Club name and number, together with a record of contributions and awards. The Club encouraged children's contributions of writing, music, poetry and art. Contributions from members were awarded Blue Certificates (worth 1 point) or Purple Certificates for particularly impressive work worth 3. Members reaching 6 points redeemed the tear-off ends for a book prize. Higher achievements won for the member a title to be attached to their Ship Name and Number: The Order of the Dragon's Tooth for 150 points and The Order of the Golden Fleece for 400 points. A further award Golden Fleece and Bar (for 600 points) was instituted later to cater for particularly talented and industrious Argonauts. The certificates were designed by "Joe". Reading of the 'Log of Progress', when these awards were announced, was an essential part of Club business.

Throughout the Argonauts Club segment, the studio team strictly adhered to the policy of only using Club names. So Atholl Fleming was 'Jason', Elizabeth Osbourne was Argo 1. Some others are given below.

The segment was opened and closed with a specially commissioned theme written by Elizabeth Osbourne and Cecil Fraser and sung by Harold Williams and the male members of the ABC Wireless Singers

Fifty mighty Argonauts, bending to the oars,
Today will go adventuring to yet uncharted shores.
Fifty young adventurers today set forth and so
We cry with Jason "Man the boats, and Row! Row! Row!"

Row! Row! Merry oarsmen, Row!
That dangers lie ahead we know, we know.
But bend with all your might
As you sail into the night
And wrong will bow to right "Jason" cry,
Adventure know,
Argonauts Row! Row! Row!

A further touch was a call to sick members: "The Ship of Limping Men", as notified by parents. Whenever possible, Atholl Fleming would visit Argonauts who were seriously ill in hospital.

On Saturdays a major segment was the Argonauts Brains Trust

From December 1944, the ABC Weekly carried an Argonauts' Page devoted to selected contributions from members and relevant news items. A prominent contributor was one Ithome 32, now known as Barry Humphries, creator of "Edna Everage".

Annual 'live' productions of the Children's Session (and Argonauts Club) were a feature of Royal Shows in each State from 1947. The showground in each Capital City had its own purpose-built ABC studio, double-glazed on three sides.

== Publications ==
Eight annuals were published:

- A.B.C. Children's Hour Annual #1 1956. The Educational Press Pty Ltd. (printed by Cumberland Newspapers, Parramatta)
- A.B.C. Children's Hour Annual #2 1957 The Educational Press Pty Ltd. (printed by Cumberland Newspapers, Parramatta)
- A.B.C. Children's Hour Annual #3 1958 The Educational Press Pty Ltd. (printed by Halstead Press, Sydney)
- A.B.C. Children's Hour Annual #4 1960 The Educational Press Pty Ltd. (printed by Halstead Press, Sydney)
- A.B.C. Children's Hour Annual #5 1961 The Educational Press Pty Ltd. (printed by Halstead Press, Sydney)

Retitled:

- The Australian Children's Annual # 6 – # 8 ed. T. S. Hepworth. 1963–1965. Angus and Robertson, Sydney.

The Introduction to Annual # 6 (1963) advises readers that it contains contributions from 'your friends from the A.B.C. Children's Hour and The Australian Children's Newspaper '. The Introduction also states that 'There are over 70,000 children ... in the Argonaut's Club ...'

At least three 'collaborative' children's books were published:

- Dangerous Secret (ABC, 1960) ed. John Gunn (Icarus)
- The Gold Smugglers (ABC, 1962) ed. John Gunn (Icarus)
- The Gravity Stealers (ABC, 1965) ed. John Gunn (Icarus)

These books were works of fiction, with an Australian theme and edited by Tom Stanley Hepworth who also edited The Australian Children's Newspaper – a publication of Educational Press Pty Ltd. Argonauts contributed a chapter for each stage of the plot, and the best was selected by Icarus for the final book. The illustrations were selected by the same process, under the guidance of Phidias (Jeffrey Smart).

These publications seem to break the 'anonymity' rule of the club: the names of the successful contributors are listed, instead of their ship number. In the case of The Gold Smugglers, a thumbnail photo and brief biography is included as well. This book (1962) states 'There are close on 100,000 members of the Argonaut's Club.'

== Staff and presenters ==
John E. C. Appleton, "John" actor and producer
Bill Bearup, "Argo 12"
Barry Brown, philatelist
Alice Burgess, "Jane" co-presenter and actress 1949–51
George Caiger, "Auceps" took over poetry from A. D. Hope 1946
Neville Cardus gave weekly talks on music while in Australia
Alan Colefax, "Tom the Naturalist"
Albert Collins (1883–1951), "Joe" "Argo 1A" ran 'Joe's Art Gallery' for the Club
James Condon, actor (Western Australia)
Paddy Conroy, producer 1962–
Douglas Cribb became "Orpheus" from 1946 to 1953 while Harold Williams was in Britain
Gina Curtis "Gina" –1959
Margaret Dalton "Nan" "Argo 10" record librarian and co-compere succeeded Elizabeth as OIC –1952
Talbot Duckmanton "Tal", a future ABC General Manager, who hosted a weekly sports segment
Lindley Evans, "Mr Melody Man" "Argo 4", a noted pianist and accompanist
John Ewart, "Jimmy" "Argo 29" co-compere 1954–72
John K. Ewers, "Inky Wells" "Diogenes"
Peter Finch, guest presenter
Atholl Fleming, "Mac" "Jason" compere 1939–72
Cecil Fraser, "Argo 9" composed club song
Barbara Frawley, "Barbara" 1957–
Dame Mary Gilmore, "Argo 8"
John Gunn, "Icarus" writing 1957–69
Wally Hanley, "Walter the sound effects man" (thereafter every sound effects man carried the same moniker)
Frank Harvey, "Nestor" (the storyteller)
Marcia Hathaway played "Judy" in Punch and Judy segment; killed in shark attack
Diana Heath
A. D. Hope, "Antony Inkwell" "Argo 3" poet
Diana Horn, "Diana"
Diane Hosking, "Robyn" 1959–
Frank Hurley, "Argo 7" gave weekly talks on photography and Antarctica
Roy Kinghorn, "Linnaeus" naturalist: 1962–1971
Billie Lean, office manager
Faith Linton, "Susan", "Argo 19" co-presenter 1951–57
Dorothy Lober, "Argo 13" sound effects officer and worker behind the scenes
Patricia Lovell (then Patricia Parr), "Pat" co-compere and future "Mr Squiggle" host and film producer
Leslie Luscombe, "Argus" literature 1953–
Garry Lyle, "Archon" literature 1946–53
Alan John "Jock" Marshall, "Jock the Backyard Naturalist" "Argo 5"
Guy Manton, "Cheiron" spoke on Greek myths and legends
Captain McCarthy, (honorary) "Argo 14" commander of British battleship HMS Argonaut
John McGrath, "Walter" sound effects officer
Frank McNeill, "Sandy the Naturalist" "Argo 11" took over from Jock Marshall during World War II
Bruce Miller "Stephen" poetry and literature
Frank Mills, art (Western Australia)
Sue Newton, "Sue" 1963–
Ida Elizabeth Osbourne, "Elizabeth" "Argo 1" 1941–49
Richard Parry, "Richard" –1967
Enid Partridge, piano accompanist when Lindley Evans not available
Patricia Pearson, "Anne" co-compere 1957–
Bill Salmon, "Apelles" succeeded Jeffrey Smart 1963–
Mollie Shackleton, "Argo 6"
Isobel Ann Shead, "Isobel Ann"
Jeffrey Smart, "Phidias" commented on art from 1951
Leonard Teale (then Leonard Thiele), "Chris" co-compere –1954
Wilfrid Thomas gave talks accompanied by recordings
Alex Walker, "Alex the Birdman"
Harold Williams, "Orpheus"

== Some prominent members ==
Marian Arnold (broadcaster) (Achilles 31)
Thea Astley (writer)
John Bannon (Premier of South Australia) (Golden Fleece Charops 37)
Richard Bonynge (conductor)
Mike Carlton (broadcaster)
Gaye Chapman (contemporary visual artist, painter, children's author) (Epistolus 48)
Dennis Condon (broadcaster) (Bucephalus 8)
Robert Dessaix (writer) (Illyria 42)
Ken Done (advertising executive, designer, painter) (Polymestor 11)
Michael Dransfield (poet) (Eumolpus 24)
David Ellyard (science journalist) (Golden Fleece & Bar Erato 42)
Nick Enright (playwright) (Alastor 35)
Jon Faine (broadcaster) (Pelleus 19)
Winsome Evans (director, Renaissance Players) (Golden Fleece & Bar Taras 3)
Tim Fischer (politician)
Kate Fitzpatrick (actress, cricket commentator)
William Fraser (editor, Australian Financial Review) (Acheaus 5)
Di Gribble (deputy chair of ABC )
Rolf Harris (painter, entertainer) (Echo 32, Perth Club)
Allan Humphries (weather presenter) (Ampelus 38)
Barry Humphries (actor, writer) (Ithome 32)
Jacqueline Kent (writer) (Dragon's Tooth Cadena 3)
Christopher Koch (writer) (Gaza 16)
Coral Lansbury (writer and academic)
Sir Charles Mackerras (conductor)
Donald McDonald (ABC chairperson)
Arthur McIntyre (artist and art critic) (Atropos 30)
Hilary McPhee (chair, Australia Council ) (Leander 39)
Humphrey McQueen (critic and author)
Joanna Mendelssohn (art critic) (Roxana 38)
Tony Morphett (scriptwriter) (Antiphon 39)
Margot Oliver (film maker) (Herodotus 31)
Marion Ord (writer) (Harmonia 1)
John Pickup (painter) (Maresa 37)
Clive Robertson (journalist)
Maurice Alexander Robertson (critic) (Dragon's Tooth Archimedes 25)
Peter Sculthorpe (composer) (Jason 50)
Thomas Shapcott (writer) (Psyche 28)
Wendy Simpson (transport CEO) (Erymanthus 30)
Russell Starke (Adelaide arts personality) Ornon 18
Anne Summers (author, editor) (Dragon's Tooth Pytheus 41)
Dame Joan Sutherland (soprano)
Geoffrey A. Taylor (former professor, safety science and OHS book author) (Tiplis 41)
Margaret Throsby (broadcaster) (Androcles 26)
Imants Tillers (artist) (Acropolis 14)
Mike Walsh (TV personality, businessman) (Pontos 7)
Malcolm Williamson (composer) (Demodocus 23)
Kate Wilson (actor, academic) (Scollis 49)
Fay Zwicky (poet, academic) (Hesperides 29)
