= Albert Collins (painter) =

Australian artist (1883–1951)

Albert E. Collins (1883 – 26 July 1951) was an Australian painter, teacher and actor born in New Zealand. After a successful career in painting and teaching he joined ABC radio, where he gave pleasure to a generation of children as "Joe" of the Children's Session and the main character in the long-running serial "The Wide-awake Bunyip".

== Teaching career ==
Albert Collins was born in New Zealand, and in 1906 left to teach drawing at Abbotsleigh School for Girls in Wahroonga where he continued taking classes until 1912. Among his students was Grace Cossington Smith

He also taught at Redlands School, Cremorne from 1913 to 1916. The school yearbook reported that "Mr Collins class for design is fast becoming a popular one. There is evidently no lack of talent, and some of the work done shows great promise for the future." One notable student was Alison Rehfisch (née Green). He awarded a special prize to another student, Jean Sulman for designing a new cover for the school magazine which was used from 1915 to 1938. He was also on the teaching staff at Normanhurst, Meriden, Ascham, St Vincent's (and perhaps others) at various times.

He also offered private tutoring. One such student was printmaker Muriel Cornish (1893–1945).

== Painting ==
From 1916 to 1951 he was a director of advertising firm "Smith and Julius" (founded by Sydney Ure Smith and Harry Julius) which specialised in quality art work for prestigious clients such as Dunlop and Berlei. Artists they employed included Frank Burdett, Harold Cazneaux, Adrian Feint, Lloyd Rees, Fred Britton, George Frederick Lawrence, James Muir Auld, Roland Wakelin, Roy de Maistre, Percy Leason and Bill Sparrow.

He was an active member of the Society of Artists and hon. secretary in 1921. He was an invited foundation member of the Australian Watercolour Institute in 1923 along with Hans Heysen, Norman Lindsay, Blamire Young, Arthur Streeton, John D. Moore, John Eldershaw and Sydney Long.

His lithograph The world's loveliest harbour, Sydney, Australia is held at the National Gallery of Australia

In 1929 he designed the Common Seal for the Ku-ring-gai Council.

The Sydney Art Gallery purchased two of his works, The Tunnel and Broken Light. Other work is held in the State galleries in Hobart and the Powerhouse Museum, Sydney.

He illustrated Odd Jobs, a book of poems by Ernest "Kodak O'Ferrall, and with his daughter Kathleen, two children's books by H. S. Blake.

== Acting ==
He was a capable actor, starring in many productions of Gregan McMahon's Repertory Theatre Company and Doris Fitton's Independent Theatre, but never played professionally. He played Samuel Pepys in the Doris Fitton production of And So To Bed in 1931 (and learned to play the recorder passably for the part). Other plays for the Independent Theatre in which he had a major part included By Candle Light The Middle Watch The Young Idea Petticoat Influence and Springtime for Henry. The Constant Nymph

As "Joe", he was co-presenter of the ABC Children's Session and Argonauts' Club from 1938 to 1951, from 1942 playing the title role in the Ruth Park series The Wide-Awake Bunyip, a popular feature of the program.

Patti Crocker remembers him as "a very funny man ... small round and vague". His ready wit did not come out "on air" however, so Ida Elizabeth Osbourne successfully rewrote his character as the butt of jokes from the rest of the cast.

== Personal ==
He had been named for Prince Albert, Queen Victoria's consort but to everyone (including himself), he was "Joe". In 1910 he married (Agnes Emily) Beatrice Fullerton, principal of Claremont College in Randwick from 1902 to 1910 and previously assistant principal of Bethany High School, Balmain. She died in 1951.

They had three daughters. Kathleen Fullerton (b. 1911) followed her father's love of amateur theatre and followed his footsteps into commercial art, gaining experience in London from 1937 to 1940. She married Roy Chandler in 1942 and moved to Adelaide. She and her father illustrated the children's books The Little White Fox and All the Way to Barcelona for H. S. (Harold Sidney) Blake. Beatrice Fullerton "Betty" (b. 1912) married Neal Dowling in 1934. The youngest, Joan, married Robert Osbiston in 1938

They were living in Warringah Rd Mosman in 1936 and by 1950 were at Addison Ave. Roseville.

Albert was a member of Sydney Rotary Club and in 1936 president of Sydney Savage Club.

Albert died in hospital of bronchiectasis while still working for the ABC. Children from Chatswood Primary School lined the streets as the funeral procession passed and his body was cremated. The Wide-Awake Bunyip series was terminated and restarted by Ruth Park as The Muddle-Headed Wombat with first Leonard Thiele then John Ewart in the title role and filling the vacancy in the Argonauts Club team.

== Sources ==
- McCulloch, Alan Encyclopedia of Australian Art, Hutchinson Ltd London 1968
