= Lindley Evans =

Australian composer, pianist and teacher (1895–1982)

Harry Lindley Evans CMG (18 November 1895 – 2 December 1982) was a Cape Colony-born Australian composer, pianist and teacher. He is best known for his collaboration with Frank Hutchens in a famous piano duet, which lasted 41 years, and as the ABC's "Mr Melody Man" for 30 years.

== Early life and education ==
Evans was born in Cape Town, Cape Colony in 1895, to British parents. He had already become an organist and chorister before moving to Sydney at the age of 17. He studied at the New South Wales State Conservatorium of Music to advance his keyboard technique with Frank Hutchens. He also taught piano privately. He later studied with Tobias Matthay in London.

== Musical career ==
Evans developed as an accompanist, playing with the flautist John Lemmone and the opera singer Dame Nellie Melba on her tours of England and Australia, from 1922 until her death in 1931. He always played from memory.

From 1920 to 1929, Evans also taught at a private girls' school. He later adapted his lectures in music appreciation as scripts for an ABC radio program called Adventures in Music.

In the 1920s, Evans joined Frank Hutchens in a two-piano partnership, which lasted from 1924 until Hutchens' death in 1965. They performed standard piano duet works as well as some of their own compositions, all played from memory. He and Hutchens included the young and then unknown Joan Hammond on one of their tours to Melbourne, Adelaide and Tasmania, over the ABC's misgivings.

Evans joined the Conservatorium in 1928 as a teacher. Colleagues included the pianist and composer Isador Goodman, who was also from Cape Town, and they became firm friends. Evans taught at the school for 40 years. From 1930 to 1946, Evans was a visiting teacher at MLC School, Burwood.

Evans wrote a small amount of solo piano music, but his only substantial piano piece is Rhapsody. The other works are considered light pieces (Vignette: Fragrance, Lavender Time, Berceuse (For a Sleeping Sand Baby)) and competition/examination pieces (Tally-Ho!, Merry Thought). He also wrote songs and choral works.

His song "Australia Happy Isle", with lyrics by Jessie Street, won the Victorian sesquicentennial prize in 1934. One of his best known works was Idyll for two pianos and orchestra, which was premiered in the Sydney Town Hall on 4 September 1943 with the Sydney Symphony Orchestra under Edgar Bainton, along with the premiere of Hutchens' Fantasy Concerto.

Evans wrote some film scores for the developing movie industry: for Charles Chauvel's Uncivilised (1936), Forty Thousand Horsemen (1940) with Willy Redstone and Alfred Hill, The Rats of Tobruk (1944), and Ken G. Hall's Tall Timbers (1937).

For thirty years from 1939, Lindley Evans was featured as "Mr Melody Man" in the ABC Children's Hour and the Argonauts Club, introduced by his theme: Lyadov's "Musical Snuffbox". His interest in music for children led to involvement in the National Music Camp Association as piano tutor, administrator, director and councillor. From 1957, he also worked with the Australian Youth Orchestra. He was often an adjudicator at eisteddfods and was an examiner for the Australian Music Examinations Board.

In 1958–1959 he had a TV series on ATN-7 titled Rendezvous with Lindley Evans.

Evans was a prominent member of Sydney's arts-based Savage Club, serving a term as president.

== Personal life ==
Evans died aged 87 on 2 December 1982, the same day as his long-time friend and colleague Isador Goodman. He was survived by his wife Marie; they had no children.

Evans' autobiography Hello, Mr Melody Man: Lindley Evans Remembers, was published in 1983.

== Legacy and honours ==
- 1963, Lindley Evans was appointed a Commander of the Order of St Michael and St George (CMG).
