= John E. C. Appleton =

Australian director

John E.C. Appleton
- Born: John Edward Corby Appleton; 20 October 1905; Walham Green, England, United Kingdom
- Died: 13 September 1990 (aged 84)
- Other names: Jack Appleton
- Education: Fort Street Boys High School
- Occupations: Theatre director; theatre manager/producer; radio actor; radio producer

John Edward Corby Appleton (20 October 1905 – 13 September 1990) was an Australian theatre and radio director and actor prominent in the 1950s.

== Early life ==
Born in Walham Green, England the oldest of eight children of an English father and an Australian-born mother, Frank and Irene, he was educated at Fort Street Boys' High School. He joined the Sydney Evening News as a journalist but after six years was sacked for supporting striking workers. During this time he had been taking night classes at the Julian Ashton Art School and started a small business painting 24-sheet posters for billboards.

== Amateur theatre ==
In 1928 he joined the Sydney Players Club, of which his father Frank was an active member, initially as an actor then producer, known as "Jack Appleton".

He then joined Doris Fitton's The Independent Theatre, where he gained further experience as actor and producer.

== Professional and Wartime experience ==
At least partly because of his horsemanship, he was engaged to play Dan Kelly in the 1934 film "When the Kellys Rode", which failed to find a distributor.

In 1936 he joined radio 2GB's "B.S.A. Players" (from 1938 known as the "Macquarie Players"), which led to further employment with 2GB. There he teamed up with Jack Davey and together set up an independent production company as his producer and announcer.

In 1940 he was engaged to fellow Independent Theatre actor Sheila Carter (1918–) They married and by war's end had one child. He spent the war years with the RAAF firstly with the American 19th Bomber Group, planning the secret Hobert (spelling?) airfield in Northern Australia, then as Intelligence Officer with 75 Squadron for 14 months. He was then involved in a group organising escape lines from New Britain, followed by a stint with MI9. His radio production company continued to grow. One notable client, from 1947 to 1949, was Robert Menzies' Liberal Party.

== Australian Broadcasting Commission ==
He was appointed Supervisor of Children's Programmes for ABC Radio in 1952. By this time he was married with three daughters. He took a very hands-on approach to the running of the Children's Session, including persuading Ruth Park to write him a part, "Tabby Cat", in the Muddle-Headed Wombat serial. He was outspoken on the damaging effects of TV on children's minds. With his conservative outlook and RAAF demeanor, he was treated as an outsider by the governing clique of the ABC. He retired in October 1970.

== Theatre ==
He acted in a great number of amateur productions (aided by his very "proper" English accent) including:

- The School for Scandal (Sheridan) with Sydney Players' Club at St James' Hall
- Scrapped (Alma Brosnan) with Turret Theatre at their Milsons Point clubhouse
- The Passion Flower (Benavente) with Turret Theatre
- The Last Enemy (Frank Harvey – an Australian writer) with Sydney Players' Club at St James' Hall
- Dutch Courage (Mac Luker – an Australian writer) with Sydney Players' Club at St James' Hall
- Intruders (Mac Luker – an Australian writer) with Sydney Players' Club at St James' Hall
- Art and Mrs Bottle (Benn Levy) with Sydney Players' Club at St James' Hall
- The Shadow of a Gunman (Seán O'Casey) with Independent Theatre at its clubrooms 175 Pitt St.
- The Importance of Being Earnest (Oscar Wilde) with Independent Theatre
- Thunder Rock (Robert Ardrey) with Independent Theatre group

As assistant producer

- Macbeth (Shakespeare) with Shakespearean Repertory Company

He served as producer for the Junior Theatre League and acted as judge for several of its annual drama festivals. and was producer for the Sydney Players Club based at St James's Hall:

- The Small Hour (Sidney Barrington Gates)
- The Rivals (Sheridan)
- Doctor Knock (Jules Romains trans. Harley Granville-Barker)
- Jonah and the Whale (James Bridie)
- Everyman of Everystreet (Mary D. Stocks)
- Libel (Edward Wooll)
- Peace and Quiet (Quintero brothers trans. Harley Granville-Barker)
- Red Sky at Night (Dymphna Cusack – a member of SPC)
- Dragon's Teeth (Shirland Quin)
- Haunted Houses (Geoffrey Whitworth)
- The Maitlands (Ronald MacKenzie)
- A Sleeping Clergyman (James Bridie)
- Bees on the Boat Deck (J. B. Priestley)
- In Theatre Street (Henri-René Lenormand)

and:

- Judgment Day (Elmer Rice) assisting Doris Fitton for Independent Theatre at the Conservatorium of Music.
- Two Gentlemen of Soho (A. P. Herbert) for Independent Theatre at its clubrooms 175 Pitt St.
- There Is No Armour (by Australian writer Lynn Foster) for Independent Theatre at its clubrooms 175 Pitt St.
- Misalliance (George Bernard Shaw) for John Alden at St James' Theatre, North Sydney
- It All Takes Time (by Australian writer John Watson) for Independent Theatre at St James' Theatre, North Sydney

at the Mercury Theatre (St James's Hall renamed)

- Love in Albania (Eric Linklater)
- Dragon's Mouth (Jacquetta Hawkes and J. B. Priestley)
- Day's Mischief (Lesley Storm)

and at the Metropolitan (for whom?):

- Richard II (Shakespeare)
- Jitta's Atonement (George Bernard Shaw)
- Carnival of Thieves (Jean Anouilh)

== Radio ==
- The Terrible Twins (2CH play) (actor)
- Beau Geste (2CH serial) (as "Digby")
- The New Adventures of Tiger Bryce (2CH serial)(as actor)
- Adventure (2UW series)
- Dithering with Davey (2GB, 2UE series)
- Dr Davey, the Happiest Man on Earth (2GB series)
- 100 Years in Australia (2GB, 2CA series)
- The Heroic Past (2UE series)
- These Old Homes (2GB, 2UE) series
- The Romance of Canada (2GB series)
- Uncle Remus
- Hester's Diary (2CH serial)
- Death Takes Small Bites (2UW series)
- Death By Horoscope (2UW 3DB series)
- Three Roads to Destiny (3KZ serial)
- ABC Children's Hour

== Other interests ==
He wrote a number of radio broadcasts for commercial radio on historic Australian homes, the scripts of which are held in the Mitchell Library.

He was active in the Pony Club movement.

== Bibliography ==
- The Australian Horse & Pony Handbook (ill. Walter Stackpool) Angus & Robertson 1986 ISBN 0-207-15301-9

(a revised edition of his Horse & Pony Handbook first pub. 1972)

== Sources ==
- Interview with Hazel de Berg
- ScreenSound Australia
