= The Muddle-Headed Wombat =

Fictional character

The muddle-headed Wombat
- First edition
- Author: Ruth Park
- Illustrator: Noela Young
- Language: English
- Genre: Fiction
- Publication place: Australia

The Muddle-Headed Wombat is a fictional wombat featured in the radio serials and later in the children's books of the same name written by Australian author Ruth Park. The books are considered classics of Australian children's literature.

== History ==
In 1941 the Australian Broadcasting Commission decided to nationalise its Children's programs, broadcast from Sydney with Ida Elizabeth Osbourne as its first producer. In 1942 she commissioned Ruth Park to write a dramatised series, The Wide–Awake Bunyip. The first episode was aired in January 1943, with "Joe" (Albert Collins) in the title role. When he died, in 1951, Ruth changed the title to The Muddle–Headed Wombat, with Leonard Teale the first to play the part. When Leonard left, John Ewart "Jimmy" made it his for the next 18 years. The part of his friend "Mouse" in both incarnations was played by the current female co-presenter. When John E. C. Appleton was made Supervisor of Children's Programs and keen to be involved, the part of "Tabby Cat" was created for him. The narrator throughout was "Mac" (Atholl Fleming).

In total, the series ran for 3129 episodes. The popularity of the series (which ended when the Children's Hour was cancelled in 1971) led Ruth Park to write her Muddle–Headed Wombat books. In 1981 and 1982, in response to popular demand the ABC re-recorded many of the earliest episodes.

== Synopsis ==
The Muddle-Headed Wombat books follow the Muddle-Headed Wombat and his friends, a good-natured, practical female mouse and a vain, neurotic male tabby cat. The characters call each other simply Wombat, Mouse and Tabby. The idea for the character arose when Park's daughter made the comment that "I don't think there's anyone in the world I'm smarter than."

Wombat's speech is peppered with malapropisms and spoonerisms, e.g. treely ruly for really and truly, lawn the mow for mow the lawn and Cindergorilla for Cinderella. He has a bicycle with red wheels, of which he is intensely proud and which he anthropomorphises, e.g. complaining that it bit him when he accidentally injured himself trying to repair it.

== Books ==
The Muddle Headed Wombat series of books was published from 1962 to 1971 by Educational Press Pty Ltd , who commissioned Ruth Park to write books based on the radio show. Noela Young (died 5 April 2018) illustrated these books.

In 1971 the rights were transferred to Angus and Robertson Pty Ltd, who commissioned the later books and reprinted those originally published by Educational Press.

- The Muddle-Headed Wombat 1962 (ISBN 0207167338)
- The Muddle-Headed Wombat on Holiday 1964
- The Muddle-Headed Wombat in the Treetops 1965
- The Muddle-Headed Wombat at School 1966
- The Muddle-Headed Wombat in the Snow 1966
- The Muddle-Headed Wombat on a Rainy Day 1969
- The Muddle Headed Wombat in the Springtime 1970
- The Muddle-Headed Wombat on the River 1970
- The Muddle-Headed Wombat and the Bush Band 1973
- The Muddle-Headed Wombat and the Invention 1975
- The Muddle-Headed Wombat on Clean-Up Day 1976
- The Adventures of the Muddle-Headed Wombat 1979
- The Muddle-Headed Wombat 1979, contains:

The Muddle-Headed Wombat
The Muddle-Headed Wombat on Holiday
The Muddle-Headed Wombat in the Treetops
The Muddle-Headed Wombat at School

- More Adventures of the Muddle-Headed Wombat 1980
- The Muddle-Headed Wombat is Very Bad 1981
- The Muddle-Headed Wombat Stays at Home 1982

== Film ==
The short animated film The Muddle-Headed Wombat (Ukrainian: Безтолковий Вомбат) was made in Ukraine in 1990 at Ukranimafilm studio, directed by Serguei Kouchnerov. It can be watched with English subtitles here.
