= Claude Williams (basketball, born 1952) =

Indigenous Australian athlete

Claude Williams (born 1952) is an Aboriginal Australian athlete who has played both rugby league and basketball for his home state of New South Wales, going on to become the first Aboriginal basketball coach in Australia.

== Early life ==
Claude Williams was born in the Sydney suburb of Camperdown in 1952, the son of country musician Claude "Candy" Williams, and first cousin to Harry Williams, the first Indigenous soccer player to represent the Socceroos at a World Cup, in 1974.

== Early sports career ==
Williams began his sporting career in cricket, playing for the Sydney Cricket Club in the AW Green Shield competition. The New South Wales Tennis Association then selected him to join their elite program.

He then started getting interested in Rugby League, and played 12 games for the South Sydney Rabbitohs in the 1972–73 season, while playing basketball in between.

== Basketball ==
In basketball, Williams represented New South Wales in 1976, 1977, 1979, and 1981. He played on multiple occasions in the National Titles and Australian Club Championships. He played 101 games in the National Basketball League for the City of Sydney Astronauts and the Sydney Supersonics between 1979 and 1986.

William was appointed assistant coach of the Supersonics for the 1986–87 season, and then head coach of the Sydney Kings, with this appointment becoming the first and only Aboriginal basketball coach. In 1989–90, he served as assistant coach of the Newcastle Falcons.

In 2015 he was working in the after-school program at the National Centre of Indigenous Excellence in Redfern.

== Other activities ==
In 2010, Williams was presenting the weekly radio program The Sweet Science on Koori Radio. The program was focused on history and issues related to Indigenous boxing, and won a Community Broadcasting Association of Australia Award for Contribution to Indigenous Broadcasting.

He was event co-ordinator for the National Indigenous 3on3 Basketball and Hip Hop Challenge ("Vibe 3on3"), a two-day youth festival that included basketball, music, dancing, art, and other cultural activities, travelling to Aboriginal communities across the country.

== Recognition ==
- 1994: Inductee of the Aboriginal and Torres Strait Islander Sports Hall of Fame
- 2021: Inaugural Claude Williams Most Valuable Player award announced by the Sydney Kings, presented to the best player during the annual Indigenous Round
