= Rendezvous with Lindley Evans =

- Also known as: Pianist Lindley Evans
- Genre: Music television
- Starring: Lindley Evans
- Country of origin: Australia
- Original language: English

Production
- Running time: 15 minutes

Original release
- Network: ATN-7
- Release: 27 July 1958 – July 1959

Rendezvous with Lindley Evans (sometimes listed in TV listings as Pianist Lindley Evans) is an Australian television series featuring pianist Lindley Evans. Running for about a year, the weekly series aired from circa 27 July 1958 to either June or July 1959. A 15-minute series broadcast on Sundays on Sydney station ATN-7; it was listed as being a live production.

Little information is available on the series.
