= Ernest O'Ferrall =

Australian poet and short story writer

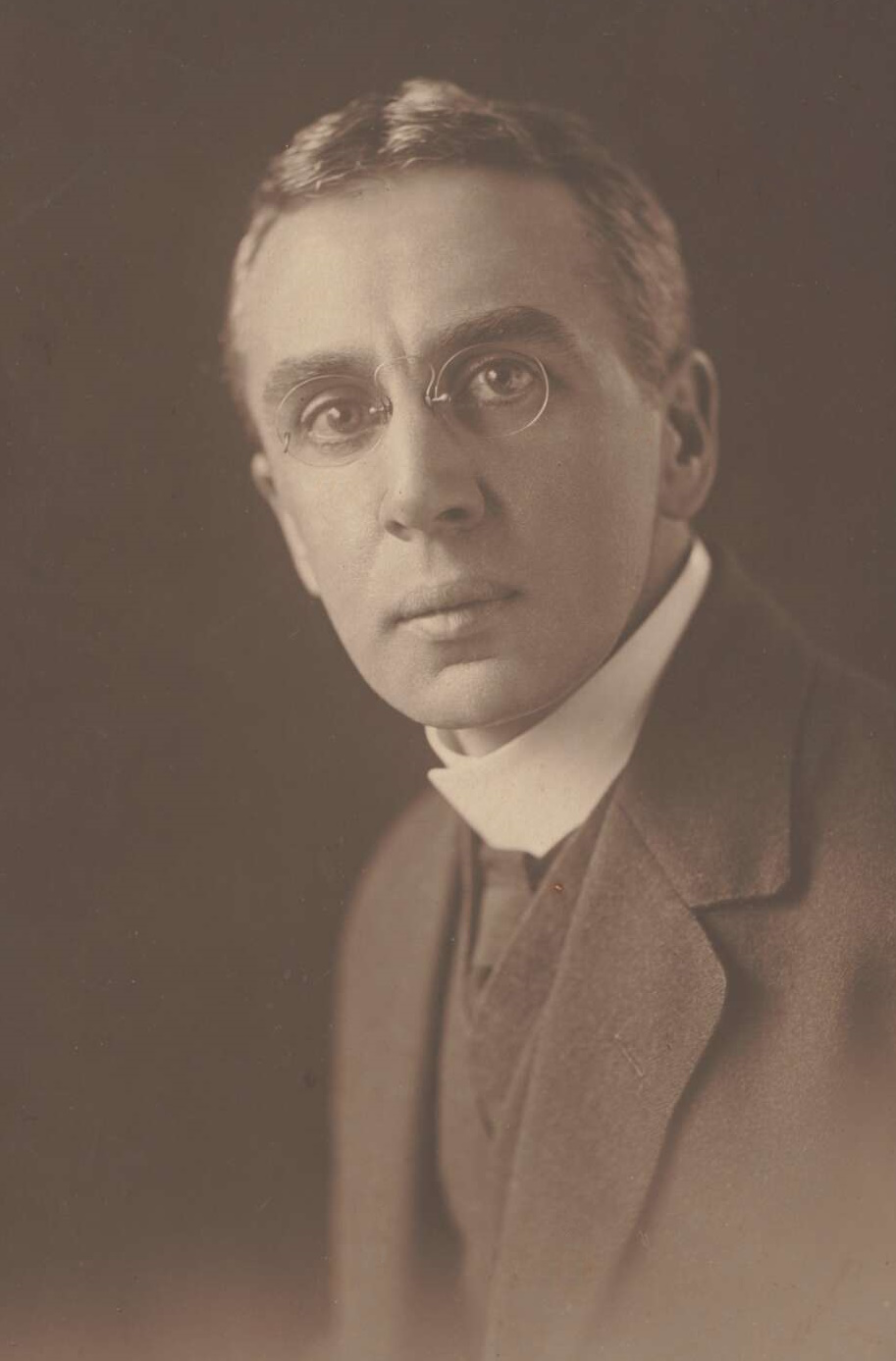
- Portrait of Ernest O'Ferrall, photographed in 1920.
- Born: Ernest Francis O'Ferrall; 16 November 1881; East Melbourne, Victoria
- Died: 22 March 1925 (aged 43)
- Occupations: journalist, writer, poet, satirist
- Writing career
- Pen name: 'Kodak'

Ernest Francis "Kodak" O'Ferrall (16 November 1881 – 22 March 1925) was an Australian journalist and writer, known for his comic sketches, short-stories and verse published under the pseudonym 'Kodak'. He was on the staff of The Bulletin magazine as a sub-editor and writer from about late 1907 to August 1920, after which he worked for Smith's Weekly until his death of tuberculosis in March 1925. He was widely known for his humorous stories and verse published in the aforementioned journals and The Lone Hand, as well as collections in book form, often illustrated by artist colleagues. His verses were used in a series of advertisements for Cobra Boot Polish featuring the character of 'Chunder Loo', illustrated by Lionel Lindsay. The advertisements appeared in The Bulletin for over a decade and were published as a popular children's book in 1915.

== Biography ==
=== Early years ===
Ernest Francis O'Ferrall was born in East Melbourne on 16 November 1881, the youngest of eight children of Hugh O'Ferrall and Mary (née Brophy). He was educated at the Christian Brothers' College in St. Kilda.^{[A]}

In about 1897, when he was aged 15, O'Ferrall began working in a Melbourne bicycle shop. He began to study wool-classing but as the prevailing drought in south-east Australia progressed (later known as the 'Federation Drought'), he decided that wool-classing would be an unprofitable pursuit. O'Ferrall then applied himself to learning shorthand and found a position in an insurance office. Later he was employed as a clerk for the International Harvester Company.

O'Ferrall lived as a lodger in a series of boarding-houses, which formed the basis of many of his stories. He began writing "light verse and humorous stories" after office hours for submission to literary journals. O'Ferrall's first contribution was sent to The Bulletin in 1901 and accepted. His earliest published story was possibly 'The Derelict', which appeared in The Bulletin in November 1901 under the pseudonym 'Kodak'. After his first success he continued submit stories and verse, which were published in such magazines and newspapers as The Bulletin, The Gadfly, The Native Companion, Arena and Steele Rudd's Magazine.

=== The Bulletin ===
By 1906 O'Ferrall's writings were often being published in The Bulletin, occasionally illustrated by artists on the magazine's staff. During 1907 his contributions continued to regularly appear in The Bulletin, as well as The Native Companion and The Lone Hand. By late in 1907 O'Ferrall was offered a position in Sydney on the editorial staff of The Bulletin by the editor, Sir James Edmond. O'Ferrall's stories and verse were predominantly comic observations of working-class city life and his inclusion within the pages of The Bulletin helped to broaden the magazine's scope beyond what had been its previous emphasis on bush-themes. As his Bulletin colleague Arthur Adams commented after O'Ferrall's death: "The secret of his humour lay in the fact that he did not look down from a bleak aloofness at his subjects". Adams described O'Ferrall as "a member of the universal family of suburbanites" and his "soul-sympathy with all the Bodgers of the suburban world... made him the subtle interpreter of that inarticulate class".^{[B]}

Ernest O'Ferrall and Florence Tanton were married on 15 December 1909 at St. Philip's Anglican church in Sydney. The couple lived at Wahroonga and had one son and two daughters. Their union was described as a "happy marriage".

Amongst his friends O'Ferrall was known as 'Pad'. He had a serious disposition and was said to be "particularly sombre-faced", but "from his melancholy he fished up subtle humor with a sly smile". O'Ferrall's "fetish for 3in.-high linen collars" led to him being referred to as the "Religious Editor" amongst the Bulletin staff.

In about April 1913 Hugh Ward, the managing director of the J. C. Williamson theatrical company, suggested to John Dalley, O'Ferrall's colleague at The Bulletin, that he should write a theatrical revue similar to such productions in Europe and America, but with an Australian scenario, with local characters and settings. Ward proposed that Dalley provide the text and scenes, to which a producer could introduce "ballets, choruses, and other special turns", with the object of staging the revue if it proved suitable. Dalley collaborated in this task with O'Ferrall and the two men wrote a revue over several months entitled 'Have You Seen Bodger?', which was set in Sydney with a scenario including references to "many topical allusions, local events and well-known citizens". The manuscript was handed over to Ward in about early August 1913. Shortly afterwards Ward informed Dalley that the J. C. Williamson company had purchased the performing rights of a London revue entitled 'Come Over Here', intending to stage it in Sydney. Ward intimated that if 'Come Over Here' proved successful the company would afterwards stage the revue written by Dalley and O'Ferrall. After "Come Over Here' opened at Her Majesty's Theatre in Sydney on 20 December 1913 it became apparent to the two writers that the company had inserted sections from their own revue into the production, thereby "substantially and materially" plagiarising their work. By doing so, the writers claimed that this "greatly enhanced the value" of 'Come Over Here' and devalued their own written revue. Dalley and O'Ferrall made application in the Equity Court seeking a commission to examine witnesses regarding the alleged plagiarism. The application was successful and the commission commenced before a barrister on 11 February 1914. In a settlement arrived at in early-April 1914, Dalley and O'Ferrall each received compensation of £350 for their work.

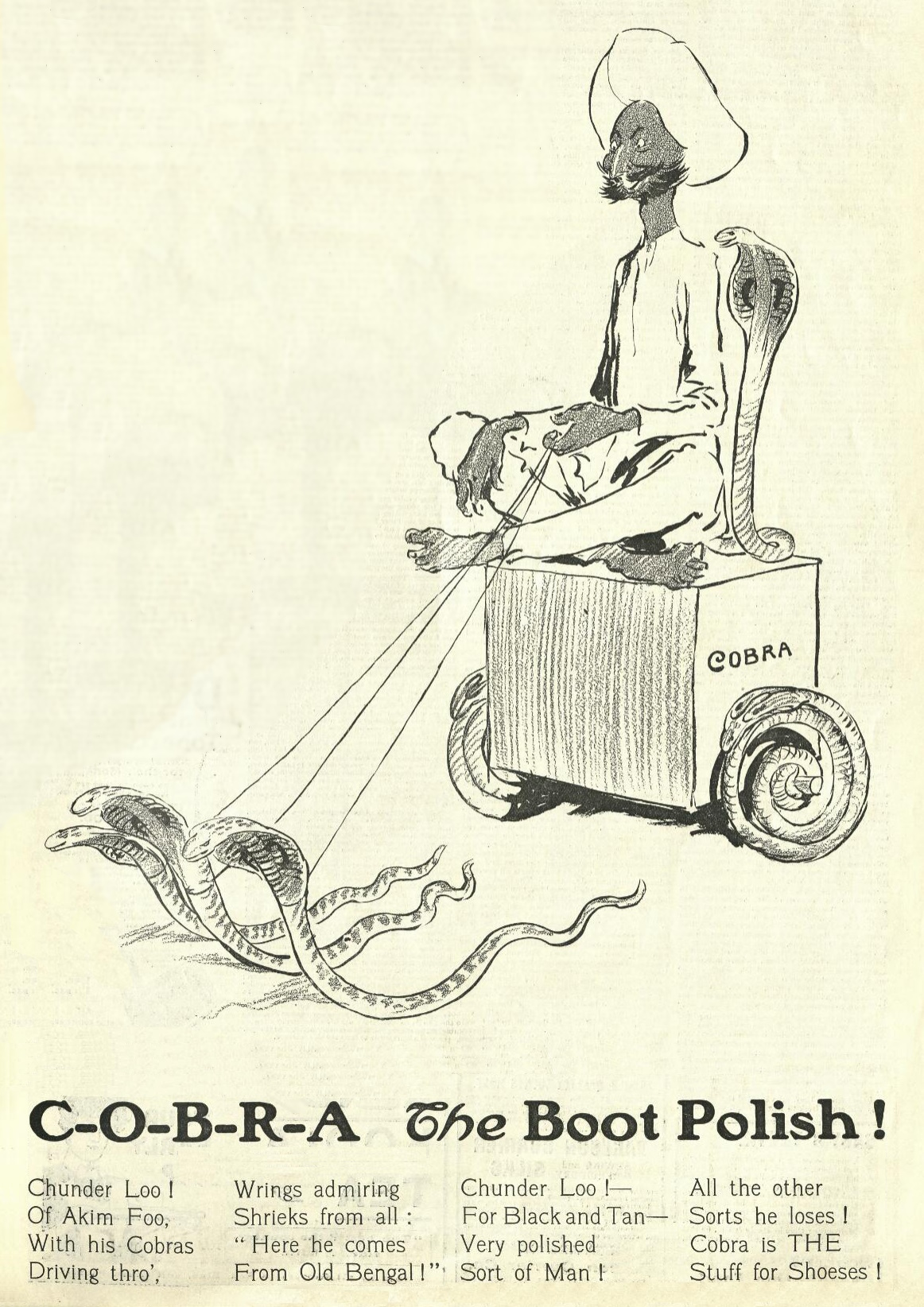
From The Bulletin, 8 April 1909.

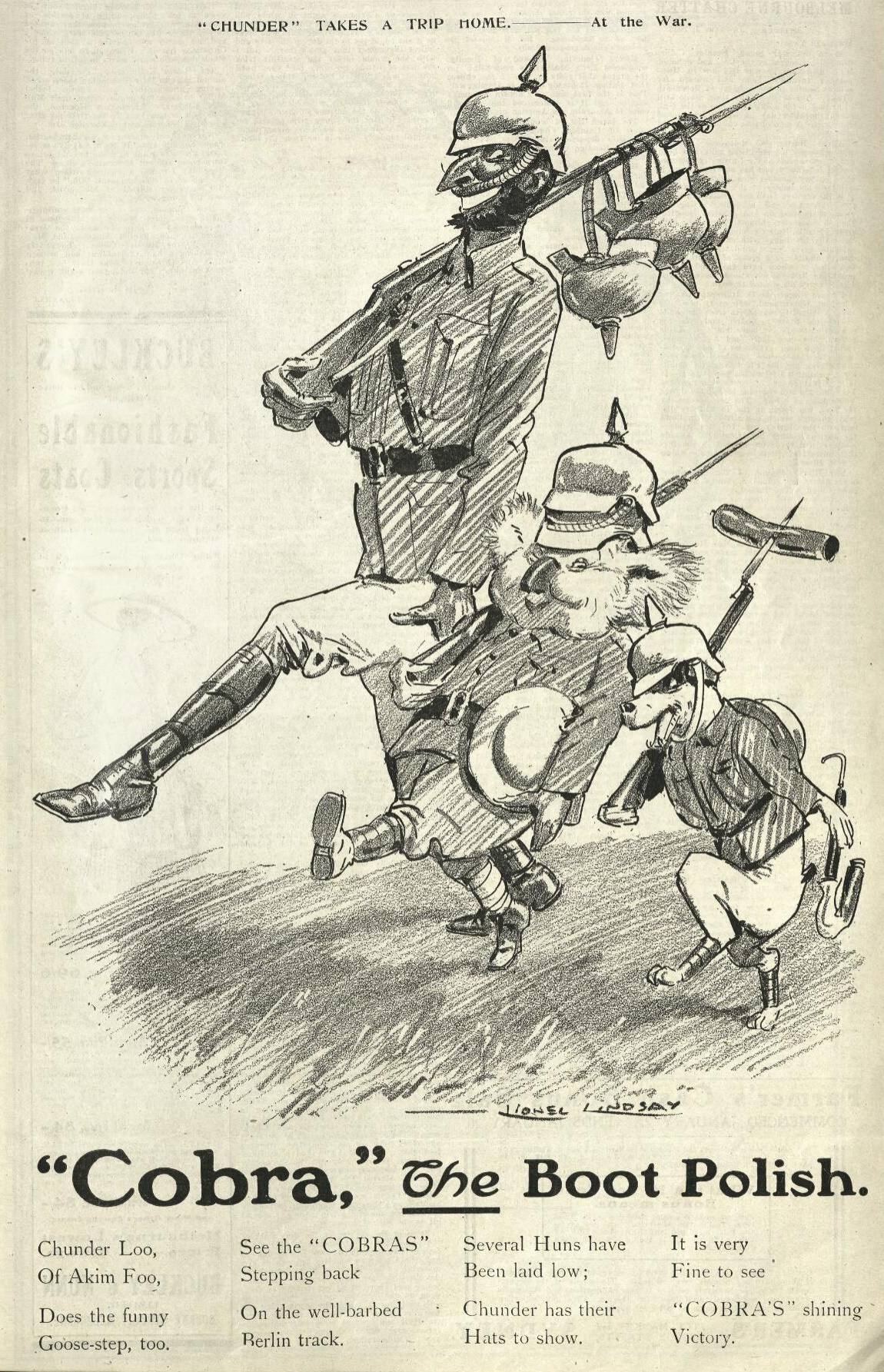
The Bulletin, 4 January 1917; drawing by Lionel Lindsay.

Two of the many advertisements for Cobra Boot Polish.

In September 1913 a one-act comedy sketch by O'Ferrall entitled 'The Bishop and the Buns' was included in the Actor's Day Matinee, an annual charity benefit by the Actors' Association of Australia held at Her Majesty's Theatre in Sydney.

In 1908 the British firm of Blyth & Platt Ltd., manufacturers of Cobra Boot Polish, opened a factory in Sydney. In 1909 full-page advertisements for Cobra Boot Polish began to be published weekly in The Bulletin, each one including verse written by O'Ferrall. The evolving series of advertisements featured a character from the Indian sub-continent named "Chunder Loo, of Akim Foo", his bevy of cobras and his two companions, an anthropomorphic koala and a fox-terrier. The drawings of some early versions of the Cobra Boot Polish advertisements include the initials "N.L.", indicating that Norman Lindsay was the artist at that stage. During the pre-war years of the White Australia policy, the depiction of racial stereotypes was a routine comedic device for artists and writers. The advertisements proved to be so popular that in 1915 the proprietors of Cobra Boot Polish published a book entitled The Adventures of Chunder Loo, featuring O'Ferrall's verse and drawings by Lionel Lindsay. During World War I the Cobra advertisements dealt with patriotic themes. The advertisements continued to be published in The Bulletin until 1920.^{[C]}

In 1915 O'Ferrall provided the lyrics, in a collaboration with Agnes Mary Lang, in the composition of a patriotic song called 'Leaf-brown Soldiers'. The sheet music of the song was published by W. H. Paling and Company of Sydney, with all proceeds from the sale to be donated to the Red Cross Fund.

In 1919 the literary critic Bertram Stevens wrote: "Kodak writes of city folk (particularly of those who dwell in boarding houses), of curates, journalists, dejected husbands, and irritable suburbanites — some of whom relieve the tedium of existence by drink and perform, strange antics for the benefit of the sober". Stevens added that some of Kodak's stories "are delicious absurdities suggested by real events". He cited the example of 'The Lobster and the Lioness', published in The Bulletin in December 1911: "The escape of a circus lioness in the city needed only the addition of a drunken gentleman returning home with a crayfish and mistaking the beast for a dog".

=== Smith's Weekly ===
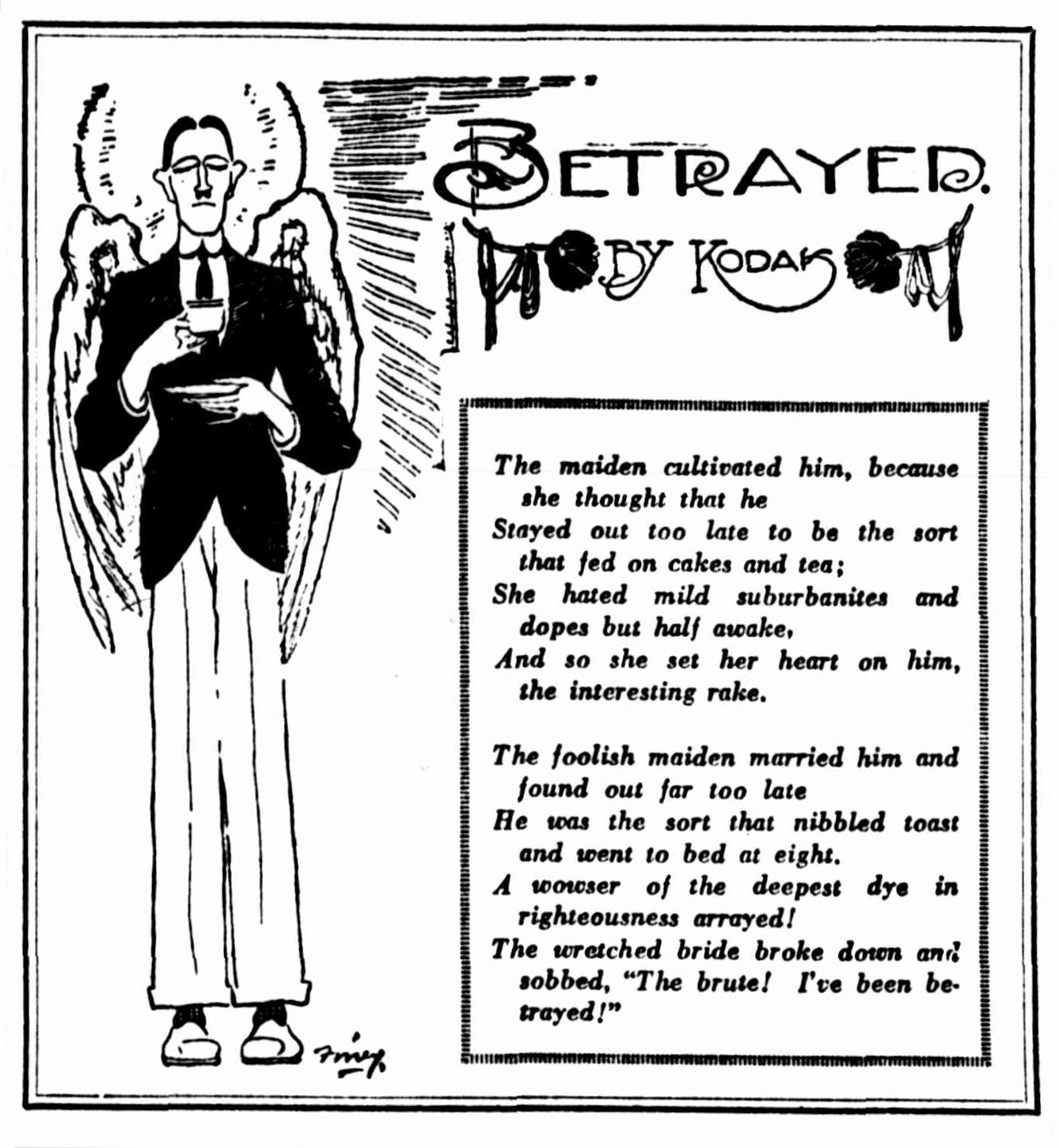
'Betrayed' by Kodak, with an illustration by George Finey (Smith's Weekly, 13 December 1924).

In about September 1920 O'Ferrall left The Bulletin and began working as a writer and sub-editor at Smith's Weekly. Regular contributions of verse and articles by 'Kodak' began to be published in Smith's Weekly from November 1920. He remained at Smith's Weekly until his death in 1925.

In 1921 a selection of O'Ferrall's comedic short stories was published under the title of Bodger and the Boarders, illustrated by drawings by Percy Lindsay.

O'Ferrall's career, writing as 'Kodak', was primarily based upon his comic stories, sketches and verse set in an inner-city or suburban context, with characters inhabiting the boarding-house, office and pub. His occasional more serious writings, in both stories and verse and dealing with wider and more profound subjects, were published under his own name.

In October 1922 the Pioneer Players in Melbourne, a company dedicated to the performance of Australian plays, opened a short season at the Athenaeum Hall, presenting a play by O'Ferrall, as well as works by Louis Esson, Stewart Macky and Henry Lawson. O'Ferrall's play was the one-act "farcical fantasy", The Bishop and the Buns, first performed in Sydney in 1913. The Melbourne performance received a poor review in The Argus: "It was acted much too slowly, and thus its unreality was emphasised".

=== Death ===
Ernest O'Ferrall died of tuberculosis on 22 March 1925, "gently and knowing no pain", at a private hospital in Pennant Hills. Described as a man possessing "a genial and remarkably lovable personality", O'Ferrall was aged 43 years when he died, leaving a wife and three children.

O'Ferrall was buried in the Catholic section of the Northern Suburbs cemetery at North Ryde. His Bulletin colleague Arthur Adams wrote: "Gathered at his graveside there were only personal friends and relations and brothers of the pen... all had loved this gentle soul, and knew he had served the community better than many a Prime Minister".

O'Ferrall's verse was posthumously collected in Odd Jobs (1928) and Stories by "Kodak" (1933).

== Publications ==
- Norman Lindsay's Book (1912) [illustrations by Norman Lindsay; stories by Edward Dyson, Montague Grover, 'Kodak' (Ernest O'Ferrall), C. J. Dennis, Granville Sedley and Norman Lindsay], Sydney: N.S.W. Bookstall Company.
- The Bishop and the Buns (1913), a one-act play.
- The Adventures of Chunder Loo (1915) (illustrated by Lionel Lindsay, with verse by Ernest O'Ferrall), published by Blyth & Platt (Australia) Ltd. (proprietors of 'Cobra' Boot Polish).
- Bodger and the Boarders (1921) (with illustrations by Percy Lindsay), Sydney: N.S.W. Bookstall Company.
- Odd Jobs (1928) (with illustrations by Albert Collins), Sydney: Art in Australia.
- Stories by "Kodak" (1933) (with illustrations by David Low), Sydney: Endeavour Press.

== Notes ==
A.Several of O'Ferrall's siblings were also writers. His sister Laura Palmer-Archer wrote as 'Bushwoman' in The Australasian and other journals. A younger sister, Nancy O'Ferrall, had short stories published in The Australasian and The Lone Hand under the pseudonym 'Bohemienne'.

B.In the English-speaking world the word 'bodger' refers to a person who works or makes repairs in a slipshod manner. The character of 'Bodger', a resident of a boarding-house, first appeared in a story by 'Kodak' called 'A House of Insults', published in The Bulletin in October 1909. The character reappeared in a February 1911 story, 'The Return of the Boarder' after which he becomes a recurring character in stories in both The Bulletin and The Lone Hand.

C.The name of the character 'Chunder Loo' is the probable origin of the common Australian term "chunder" (meaning vomit), as rhyming slang for "spew".
