= The Fire on the Snow (1951 production) =

1951 British radio drama

Fire on the Snow
- Genre: verse drama play
- Running time: 60 mins (9:15 pm – 10:15 pm)
- Country of origin: United Kingdom
- Language: English
- Home station: BBC Home Service
- Syndicates: BBC
- Starring: John Mills
- Written by: Douglas Stewart
- Directed by: Tyrone Guthrie
- Recording studio: Sydney
- Original release: May 28, 1951

The Fire on the Snow is a 1951 British radio drama that aired on the BBC. It was based on the Australian verse drama The Fire on the Snow by Douglas Stewart about the Terra Nova Expedition to Antarctica by Robert Falcon Scott. The production was the first time an Australian radio drama had received such a prestigious production at the BBC. It was directed by Tyrone Guthrie and featured two movie stars, John Mills and Peter Finch.

Stewart's play originally aired in Australia in 1941. Peter Finch was meant to appear in the original production but enlisted in the army. The play was much acclaimed in Australia and was performed several times.

Tyrone Guthrie rarely produced for the BBC but was an admirer of the play and agreed to direct it. Two of the cast - Finch and Peter Bathurst - were Australian, and Mills had previously played Scott in the 1948 film Scott of the Antarctic. Guthrie said:

In my opinion this is one of the few important works of art which radio has so far produced. It is the more thrilling that it has come from Australia, a continent which has not —as yet— made very many or very notable contributions to the art and literature bf the human race. As yet, Australia is only beginning to grope towards a distinctively Australian way of seeing and hearing and then expressing things...Australia is just beginning to realise that dependence upon the culture of other communities is not healthy or satisfying.

== Reception ==
The Observer called the play "exceedingly interesting." The Guardian called it "a moving and dramatic composition".

The play received some criticism in Britain because of its historical depiction of Scott.

== Cast ==
- John Mills as Captain Robert Falcon Scott, C.V.O., R.N.
- Peter Finch as Edward Adrian Wilson, B.A., M.B.
- Peter Coke as Captain Lawrence Oates
- Peter Bathurst as Lieutenant Henry Robertson Bowers, R.I.M.
- Arthur Hambling as Petty Officer Edgar Evans, R.N.:
- Patricia Brent as Narrator
