= Frank Hutchens =

New Zealand musician

- Born: 15 January 1892; Leeston, New Zealand
- Died: 18 October 1965 (aged 73); Mona Vale, New South Wales, Australia
- Occupations: Music teacher, concert pianist, composer

Francis Hutchens OBE (15 January 1892 – 18 October 1965) was a pianist, music teacher and composer originally from New Zealand. He became a popular concert pianist in Australia and was a founding member of the New South Wales Conservatorium of Music, where he taught for fifty years.

== Early life and education ==
Hutchens' parents, Richard Lavers Hutchens and his wife Maria Giles, née Hosking, both Cornish, migrated to New Zealand in 1879. Richard tried his hand at farming and bootmaking before settling down at Hāwera as a piano teacher. Frank Hutchens was born in Leeston near Christchurch on 15 January 1892. He attended Hawera District High School.

In 1904, at the age of twelve, Hutchens had the opportunity to demonstrate his talents after his piano teacher arranged for him to play for the virtuoso Ignaz Paderewski, who was then touring New Zealand. Impressed with the boy's potential, Paderewski encouraged him to study in Europe. The following year, at the age of thirteen, Hutchens travelled alone to London to attend the Royal Academy of Music, where he studied piano and composition with Tobias Matthay and Frederick Corder. At the Academy, he won the Sterndale Bennett and Thalberg scholarships, and also the Hine Prize and the Chappell gold medal for pianoforte playing. In 1909, at the age of 17, he became the youngest sub-professor yet appointed to the Academy. In 1911 however, he was forced to return home after his mother fell ill and the family faced financial difficulties.

== Later career ==
Having given many recitals in New Zealand, Hutchens decided in 1913 to return to London to resume his career, but after arriving in Sydney, Australia, for a stopover, he was given the opportunity to perform with the Sydney Amateur Orchestral Society conducted by Alfred Hill. He decided to stay, and in 1915 was offered a position by Henri Verbrugghen as a founding professor with the newly formed New South Wales Conservatorium of Music, which he accepted. Hutchens was rejected for military service in 1916, and he went on to become an influential teacher of such talents as Valda Aveling, retaining his role as a professor with the Conservatorium for fifty years. Prior to his death in 1965 at the age of 73, he was the only remaining original member of the Conservatorium on staff.

In addition to his successful teaching career, Hutchens in 1924 formed a piano duo with Lindley Evans, which was destined to become another long and successful partnership. Over the course of the next forty years, Hutchens and Evans made many tours of Australia and New Zealand, giving concerts and broadcasts, and they were among the first composer-performer teams to be recorded commercially in Australia.

Highlights of the partnership included the premiere of Hutchens' own work the Fantasie Concerto and Evans' Idyll with the Sydney Symphony Orchestra in 1943 (later recorded by the duo in 1962), a recital for Dame Nellie Melba, and the premiere performance in Australia of Francis Poulenc's Concerto for Two Pianos in D minor. The success of the Hutchens-Evans partnership enabled them to establish a scholarship for young musicians, funded by their own concerts.

As an examiner for the Associated Board of the Royal Schools of Music and Trinity College of Music in London, Hutchens had the requisite experience to assist in the establishment of the Australian Music Examinations Board as an independent body. He was also a professor at the Newcastle Conservatorium of Music, President of the NSW Musical Association, a director of APRA, and a member of the Sydney Conservatorium's advisory board.

== Personal life ==
In 1955, Hutchens married Joyce White, granddaughter of R. H. D. White. His wife, a former pupil of his whom he had known since 1927, was a musician herself who gave much encouragement to his career. The couple had no children.

He was still active as a performer and teacher when he sustained fatal injuries in a car accident that occurred in Sydney's northern suburbs. On 18 October 1965, he died at the nearby Mona Vale Hospital.

== Awards and honours ==
Hutchens was made a Fellow of the Royal Academy of Music in 1939, and was also named a "Bard of Cornwall". In the 1962 Queen's Birthday Honours he was appointed an Officer (OBE) of the Order of the British Empire for "services to Music in the State of New South Wales."

Scholarships in composition are awarded annually in his name to students under 25, and his portrait, by Cornish painter Stanhope Forbes, is held by the Sydney Conservatorium to which he devoted so much of his working life.

== Music ==
Hutchens wrote a considerable amount of music, and his works are said to have "charm and craftsmanship". Among his best-known works are the Concerto Symphonique for piano and orchestra, the Concerto and Quintet (both for piano and strings), the Fantasie Concerto, and Air Mail Palestine for baritone and orchestra. He also made a large number of recordings for the ABC.
