= Frank Clewlow =

British actor and theatre director (1885–1957)

- Born: Frank Dawson Clewlow; October–December 1885; Stone, Staffordshire, England, United Kingdom
- Died: 13 June 1957 (aged 71)
- Other name: Stafford Dawson (professionally)
- Education: University of Birmingham
- Occupations: Actor; director; producer; manager
- Known for: Federal Controller of Productions, Australian Broadcasting Commission

Frank Dawson Clewlow (October–December 1885 – 13 June 1957) also known under pseudonym of Stafford Dawson, was an English-born actor, director, stage and radio producer and theatre manager, he worked in his native England, as well as Scotland during the 1910s and 1920s, before emigrating to Australia in 1926 where he continued his career and in 1936 he became Federal Controller of Productions for the Australian Broadcasting Commission (later Corporation – ABC).

== Early life ==
He was born in Stone, Staffordshire, England, to Joseph Clewlow (born 1858 Stafford, Staffordshire) and his wife Mary Jane Dawson (born 1857 in Luton, Bedfordshire) whom he married on 29 December 1884 at St Mary, Luton. Frank had two younger siblings Hilda Dorothy Clewlow (born 1891 in Stone) and Harry Dawson Clewlow (born 1898 in Stone) He went to Alleyne's Grammar School then studied maths, physics, chemistry, zoology and botany at the University of Birmingham, but became involved with the Pilgrim Players and, under the influence of Barry Jackson and John Drinkwater, never completed the course. He borrowed £4 and ran away from home as he couldn't take his University exams due to working on the play there. He joined a repertory company in Ilkeston, Derbyshire.

He worked for two years as leading actor and stage manager under the name "Stafford Dawson" in 1909 for Annie Horniman at the Manchester Gaiety Theatre, Manchester., then toured with Allan Wilkie (father of Australian journalist Douglas Wilkie) to the Far East in 1911.

On his return, he was appointed by (later Sir) Barry Jackson as actor-producer with his newly formed Birmingham Repertory Company (1913–1918) where he appeared in:

== List of plays ==
- Henry IV Part 1 11 October 1913
- Cap and Bells 25 October 1913
- The Critic 1 November 1913
- Christmas Nativity Plays 20 December 1913
- The Critic 26 December 1913
- As you like it 7 January 1914
- Christmas Party 10 January 1914
- Candida 24 February 1914
- She stoops to conquer 18 March 1914
- Mock Doctor 28 March 1914
- Twelfth Night 20 April 1914
- As you like it 23 April 1914
- Rebellion 2 May 1914
- Cap and Bells 23 May 1914
- The Critic 30 May 1914
- His Excellency the Governor 13 June 1914
- Eldest Son 29 August 1914
- End of the World 12 September 1914
- Cupid and the Styx 19 September 1914
- David Ballard 19 October 1914
- New Ways to Pay Old Debts 24 October 1914
- The Wild Duck 21 November 1914
- The Second Mrs Banks 24 November 1914
- Cupid and the Styx 28 November 1914
- Strife 5 December 1914
- She stoops to conquer 26 December 1914
- The Silver Box 13 February 1915
- Tempest 17 April 1915
- Return of the Prodigal 15 May 1915
- The Liars 22 May 1915
- The Rivals 4 September 1915
- Keepers of the Garden 9 September 1915
- Candida 23 October 1915
- His Majesty's Pleasure 30 October 1915
- The Faithful 4 December 1915
- Twelfth Night 11 March 1916
- The Alchemist 8 April 1916
- Twelfth Night 22 April 1916
- The Tempest 22 April 1916
- Merry Wives of Windsor 24 April 1916
- Macbeth 29 April 1916
- The Merchant of Venice 3 May 1916
- As You Like It 15 May 1916
- David Ballard 17 May 1916
- Merry Wives of Windsor 21 June 1916
- Good Natured Man 16 September 1916
- Cupid and the Styx 30 September 1916
- Sweeps of '98 7 October 1916
- God of Quiet 7 October 1916
- The Silver Box 14 October 1916
- Misfortune of Being Clever 21 October 1916
- First Distiller 26 October 1916
- Farmers Wife 11 November 1916
- Puss in Boots 26 December 1916
- The Critic 20 January 1917
- Tragedy of Nan 24 February 1917
- Cupid and the Styx 3 March 1917
- While Rome Burns 10 March 1917
- Education of Mr Surrage 19 March 1917
- Merry Wives of Windsor 7 April 1917
- Augustus in Search of a Wife 14 April 1917
- Twelfth Night 23 April 1917
- Two Gentlemen of Verona 28 April 1917
- Change 8 September 1917
- Over a Wall 20 October 1917
- Cophetua 27 October 1917
- Tragedy of Nan 3 November 1917
- Trelawny of the Wells 10 November 1917
- Corsican Brothers 24 November 1917
- Just to Get Married 23 February 1918
- St George and the Dragon 30 March 1918
- Measure for Measure 23 April 1918
- Twelfth Night 2 May 1918
- The Silver Box 18 May 1918
- Cupid and the Styx 25 May 1918
- Taming of the Shrew 15 June 1918

== Director-producer ==
He played with Ian McLaren's company as Touchstone and Sir Andrew Aguecheek, In November 1921 he met Herbert Pochin and Walter Martin in a cafe to discuss setting up the Leicester Drama Society. The inaugural meeting took place on 25 January 1922 at Council Room at the Chamber of Commerce where he was appointed Honorary Secretary. Following this on 11 April 1922 a public meeting was held at the Association Hall in Leicester where Frank persuaded Lena Ashwell to form a Leicester branch of the British Drama Society and directed it for three years. Of the three founding members Frank Clewlow was the only one with acting experience. Whilst there he produced

- The Silver Box 12 June 1922
- The Cobblers Shop 1922
- The Fantasticks 1922
- Othello 1923 (and played the part of the Moor)
- Strife 1923
- The Cassils Engagement 1923
- An Enemy of the People 1923
- The Merry Wives of Windsor 1924

== Scottish productions ==
He worked as producer for Scottish National Theatre Society (1922–1947) at The Athenaeum Theatre in Glasgow and the Museum Hall in Bridge of Allan for two years where he directed

- Thomas the Rhymer 2 December 1924
- The Two Shepherds 2 December 1924
- The Lifting 1 February 1925
- The Guinea's Stamp 13 February 1925
- Mary Stuart 24 March 1925
- The Dark Lady 25 March 1925
- James the First of Scotland 11 May 1925
- The Inn of Adventure 13 October 1925
- Punch Counts Ten 22 December 1925
- Souterness 19 January 1926
- The House of the Queen 19 January 1926
- Gregarach 23 March 1926
- The Fantasticks 23 March 1926

, and as stage manager for Royal Carl Rosa Opera Company.

== Immigration to Australia and personal life ==
He was brought out to Australia in 1926 by Wilkie, as actor and stage director. He married Minnie Suckling, an actress with the same troupe (having previously married Gertrude Mary T Littlewood between April and June 1910 in St John Baptist, Hulme, Manchester, Lancashire, England). He played Henry VIII, Mercutio and Lafeu at the Theatre Royal, Hobart and Henry VIII at the Otago Theatre, Dunedin, New Zealand.

== Career in Australia ==
It was during this time he met a young actor Catherine Duncan with whom he was to have a professional association several years later.

He was appointed director of the Melbourne Repertory Theatre Society, succeeding Gregan McMahon in 1928., amongst other plays directed The Touch of Silk (by Australian playwright Betty Roland) in November of that year. Angel Symon, who had also toured with Wilkie and assembled an important collection of stage ephemera now held at the University of Adelaide, was his secretary. The Repertory Theatre disbanded around 1930 after encountering financial difficulties.

Clearly a man of huge enthusiasms, newspaper cuttings of this time show him appearing in public almost every week, whether conducting poetry recitals, lectures on German theatre, on poetry, judging at eisteddfods and elocution competitions, even opening an art exhibition in 1930. He contributed an article The Future of the Theatre for July 1931 Stream leftist literary journal that included an article by Nettie Palmer.

He was responsible for the stage debut of Coral Browne in the George Bernard Shaw play You Never Can Tell at the Garrick Theatre in 1930.

Around 1930 he organised a series of "great plays" for 3LO, a new member station of the Australian Broadcasting Commission, which led to his appointment in 1931 as Director of Drama for that station. He assembled a strong group of radio actors to perform several great plays every week. A similar group was assembled by his counterpart in Sydney, Laurence Halbert, and the two stations exchanged programs by landline and transcription disc.

In 1938 he was moved to Sydney to become National Director of Productions for the ABC by (later Sir) Charles Moses, who was developing the Commission into a more centralised network. It is difficult now to appreciate what a powerful position this was, but in the decades before television radio drama was the chief form of entertainment for most Australians and the major radio networks provided the chief source of employment for many hundreds of actors (and a springboard to a movie career for many such as Peter Finch) and the drama heads of radio stations and production houses such as Grace Gibson and Hector Crawford could make or break an actor and the success or otherwise of a production could make or break a program.

- As guest adjudicator for a Melbourne elocution competition in 1934, he was impressed with Ida Elizabeth Osbourne and found parts for her in radio productions.
- He commissioned Edmund Barclay to write the series As Ye Sow which ran for most of 1937.
- In 1939 he cast the (then) unknown Nigel Lovell in a radio adaptation of The Wild Ass's Skin by Balzac, then as Romeo in Shakespeare's Romeo and Juliet.
- That same year he was authorised by ABC head Charles Moses to create a national children's radio program, and called on Osbourne to develop what became the highly influential Children's Session and Argonauts Club.
- Later that same year he placed Peter Finch on contract.
- He produced one of the most famous Australian radio plays, The Fire on the Snow by Douglas Stewart, first performed by the ABC on 6 June 1941 with Ida Elizabeth Osbourne as Narrator.
- In 1943 he commissioned Gwen Meredith to write a radio serial to be a feature of the Country Hour, with the remit of providing agricultural information along with entertainment, expressly to consult with the NSW Agricultural Department and the ABC Rural Department. That program The Lawsons ran from 1944 to 1949 then morphed into the historic Blue Hills which ran until 1976.
- He appointed Catherine Duncan to write for radio after judging her entry The Sword Sung in a Sydney New Theatre competition.

But rivals and opponents such as Leslie Rees and Lawrence H Cecil were developing influence within the organization. His insistence on "high standards" could easily be interpreted as reactionary, and his acid tongue made enemies of people who disagreed with him. In 1950 he was excised from his position and (quite unwillingly) transferred to Hobart to produce plays there.

== Recognition ==
- He appeared in the Who's Who in Australia for publications 1936 and 1947.
- A portrait of Clewlow painted by Jack Carington Smith was an exhibited entry for the 1955 Archibald Prize.
