= Laura Palmer-Archer =

Australian short story writer (1864–1929)

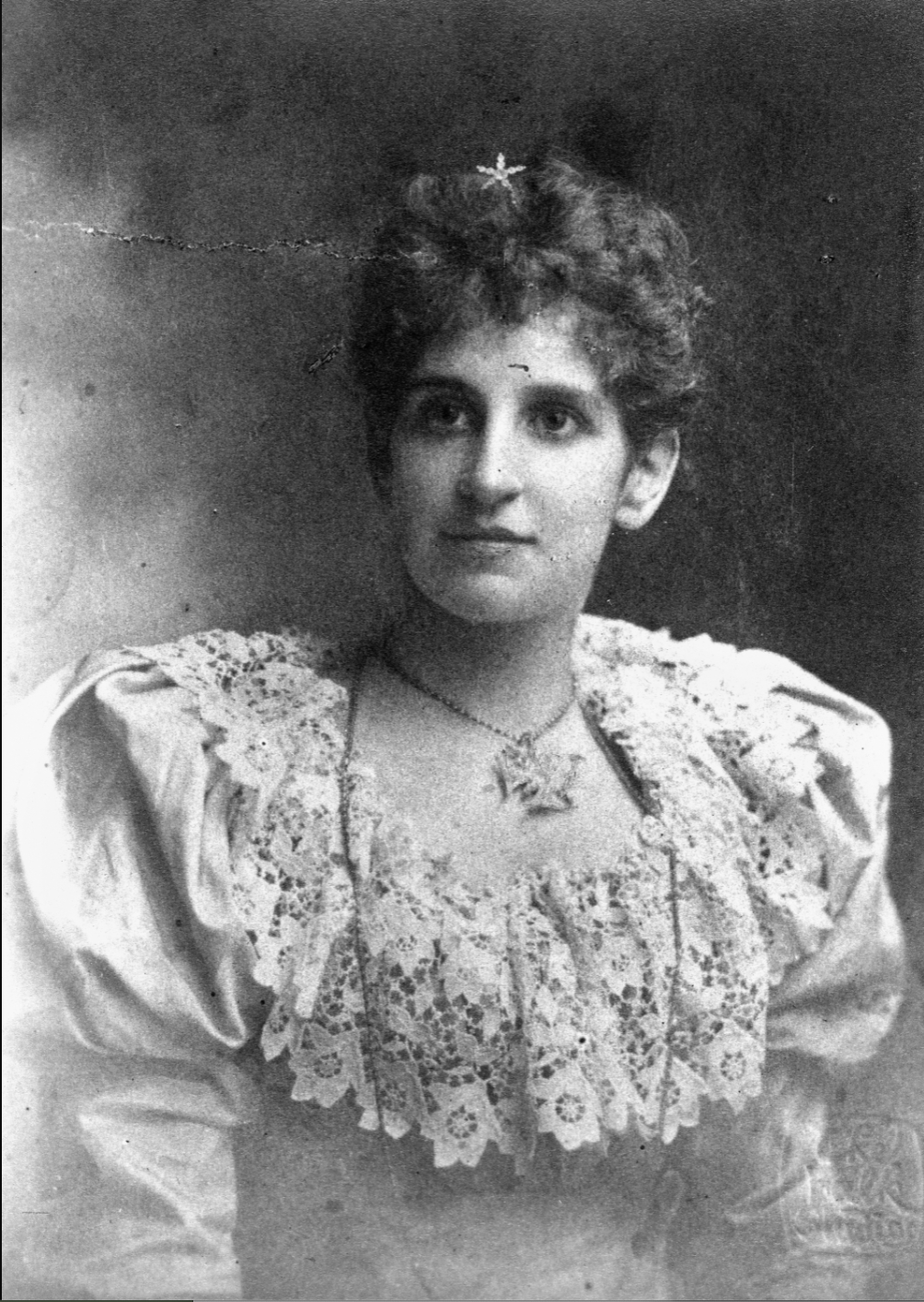
- Palmer-Archer, c.1904
- Born: Laura Maude O'Ferrall; 1864; Melbourne, Victoria, Australia
- Died: 8 June 1929 (aged 64–65); Belgrave, Victoria, Australia
- Writing career
- Pen name: Bushwoman
- Notable works: A Bush Honeymoon and other stories

Laura Maude Palmer-Archer (1864 – 8 June 1929) was an Australian short story writer, who mainly wrote using the pseudonym "Bushwoman". She is best known for her 1904 book, A Bush Honeymoon and other stories.

Palmer-Archer was born in Melbourne, Victoria in 1864 to parents of Irish heritage. One of her brothers, Ernest O'Ferrall, was a short story writer and poet, who wrote as "Kodak" for The Bulletin.

In 1888 Palmer-Archer married Tom Palmer-Archer and moved with him to a property in outback Queensland. Many of her stories a based on her first-hand experience of rural life.

Palmer-Archer wrote short stories for The Australasian, the first appearing in November 1894 and the last in December 1928. Her first book of collected stories, Racing in the Never-Never and other stories.

Her 1904 book, A Bush Honeymoon and other stories, was published in London by T. Fisher Unwin. It was a compilation of stories previously published in The Australasian (Melbourne) and the Australian Town and Country Journal (New South Wales). In the Foreword, Rolf Boldrewood said:

It appeared to me a matter of simple justice, as well to the British public as to a talented writer, that work of such genuine merit should find a permanent place in literature.

— Rolf Boldrewood, A Bush Honeymoon and other stories, Foreword

In the 1920s she began to write poems for children which were published regularly in The Australasian and also recited on radio by "Mary Gumleaf" as "Kiddyosities".

Palmer-Archer died in hospital in Belgrave, Victoria on 8 June 1929.

== Works ==
- Palmer-Archer, Laura M. (1899). Racing in the Never-Never and other stories. George Robertson & Co.
- Palmer-Archer, Laura M. (1904). A bush honeymoon and other stories (Colonial ed.). T. Fisher Unwin.

A number of her short stories may be found on The Australian Newspaper Fiction Database. She was incorrectly attributed as "Miss Archer", author of the novel, Mr Moore, which was serialised in the Sydney Mail in 1880.
