= Harry Williams (soccer, born 1951) =

Australian Football player

Personal information
- Full name: Harry Williams
- Date of birth: 7 May 1951 (age 75)
- Place of birth: Sydney, Australia
- Position: Defender

Senior career*
| Years | Team | Apps | (Gls) |
| 1970–1977 | St. George Budapest | | |
| 1978 | Canberra City SC | | |
| 1985–1986 | Inter Monaro | 19 | (0) |
| 1990 | Inter Monaro | 2 | (0) |

International career^{‡}
| 1970–1977 | Australia | 13 | (0) |
- * Club domestic league appearances and goals as of 22 August 2007 ‡ National team caps and goals as of 22 August 2007

Harry Williams (born 7 May 1951) is a former soccer player. He was the first recognised Indigenous Australian to play for the senior Australian national football team, the Socceroos. He was part of Australia's 1974 FIFA World Cup squad.

== Early life ==
Williams was born in 1951 in Sydney of Aboriginal and Welsh descent. From the age of nine, Williams played junior soccer for St George Police Boys side in Sydney.

== Career ==
Williams played between 1970 and 1977 in the New South Wales competition for St George Budapest. 1978 he played for a year for Canberra City SC. 1985 and 1989 he had brief comebacks with Queanbeyan club Inter Monaro.

He was recruited to the national side at the age of 19, and went on an overseas tour with the team in 1970. In 1974, having only played six matches for Australia as a senior, Williams was part of Australia's first foray into the World Cup Finals in West Germany 1974. In the third and last match of Oz at the tournament vs. Chile, which ended 0–0, he replaced Colin Curran, the first ever Australian scorer of a goal in World Cup finals, in the 83rd minute.

Including qualifiers, Williams played six World Cup matches for Australia during his career. In total, he represented Australia 17 times between 1970 and 1978.

== Recognition ==
A 2005 photo of Williams by photographer Sahlan Hayes was purchased by the National Gallery of Australia.

== Family ==
He is the first cousin of basketball player Claude Williams, who was the first and only Aboriginal basketball coach. Claude is the son of musician Claude "Candy" Williams.
