= The Stranger (Australian TV series) =

- Genre: Science fiction
- Created by: G. K. Saunders
- Starring: Ron Haddrick
- Country of origin: Australia
- Original language: English
- No. of series: 2
- No. of episodes: 12

Production
- Running time: 30 minutes

Original release
- Network: ABC Television
- Release: 26 April 1964 – 25 July 1965

The Stranger is an Australian science fiction children's television series which first screened on the ABC in 1964 to 1965. It was produced by the Australian Broadcasting Commission. It is notable as Australia's first locally produced science fiction television series and one of the first Australian TV series to be sold overseas.

== Synopsis ==
A schoolmaster finds an unconscious young man on his doorstep, takes him in, and looks after him. A firm friendship develops between the stranger and the headmaster's children Bernard and Jean, and their friend Peter, leading them to discover the stranger's secret: that he is from another planet and has been sent to find a new home on Earth for his people. The stranger, Adam, is joined by fellow alien Varossa. They live in a society without books where they memorize everything. In the second series the children have to enlist the help of the Australian Prime Minister when Peter is kidnapped by the alien, and a procession of intrigues eventually leads them to the aliens' home planet of Soshuniss.

== Production ==
The Stranger began life as a six-part radio series, broadcast on the BBC Home Service from December 1963. This was written by New Zealand-born author G.K. Saunders and starred David Spenser as "The Stranger", Adam Suisse. The Australian TV version followed four months later, again scripted by Saunders, produced by Storry Walton and directed by Gil Brealey, with production design by Geoffrey Wedlock. Two series of six episodes each were produced in 1964 and 1965. It was a major hit in Australia and was sold back to the BBC. The first series (episodes 1 – 6) were broadcast on BBC1 on consecutive Thursdays at 17:25, from 25 February to 1 April 1965 but never repeated. Series 2 (episodes 7–12), was shown from Tuesday 11 January 1966 on BBC1 at 17:00.

The series starred leading stage and radio actor Ron Haddrick as "The Stranger"; the children were played by Janice Dinnen and Bill Levis as Jean and Bernard (Bernie) Walsh and Michael Thomas as their friend Peter Cannon.

The series was notable for the fact that Saunders devised a special language that the aliens spoke amongst themselves and, like later science fiction series such as Babylon 5, they spoke English with a 'foreign' accent; in the story Adam can speak German and French, and this leads to the children's father's initial assumption that he is from Switzerland (whence his surname; Adam comes from Adam and Eve).

The series was made with cooperation from the CSIRO with pivotal scenes shot on location at the Parkes Observatory and the facility's radio telescope featured in the iconic opening title sequence. The CSIRO were also consulted on the design of the alien spacecraft that lands on the steps of the Sydney Town Hall where the aliens are greeted by the Prime Minister, played by veteran Australian screen star Chips Rafferty.

In 2019 the entire series was digitally restored by the ABC and in January 2020 was released on their on demand service iview and the ABC TV & iview YouTube channel.

== Cast ==
=== Main cast ===
- Ron Haddrick as Adam Suisse, the titular Stranger
- Janice Dinnen as Jean Walsh
- Bill Levis as Bernie Walsh
- Michael Thomas as Peter Cannon
- John Faassen as Mr. Walsh
- Jessica Noad as Mrs. Walsh
- Owen Weingott as Professor Mayer
- Reg Livermore as Varossa

=== Supporting cast ===
- Mary Mackay as the female Soshun
- Ben Gabriel as the male Soshun
- Grant Taylor as Detective Inspector Chisolm
- Jeffrey Hodgson as Detective Howell
- Kit Taylor as RMSF Smith
- Ivor Bromley as Colonel Nash
- Ronne Arnold as Dr. Kamutsa
- Bernie Baia as Dr. Matoula
- Alex Cann as Rudolph Lindenberger
- Chips Rafferty as the Prime Minister
- Reg Livermore as Varossa
- Henry Gilbert as Hutchins
- Tommy Dysart

=== Guests ===
- Barry Ross as Town Clerk
- Dennis Carroll as Edward Mayer
- Denys Burrows as the Chief Police Inspector
- Don Philps as Wilson
- Douglas Morgan as Police Officer
- Gordon Glenwright as Lord Mayor
- John Fegan as Police Officer
- John Unicomb as Istosin
- Judy Nunn in a minor role (episode 7)
- Keith Buckley is John Robinson
- Kerry McGuire as Nurse
- Max Phipps as Soshuniss Elder
- Nigel Lovell as Group Captain Ponsonb
- Reg Evans as Soshuniss Elder
- Robert McDarra as Squadron Leader
- Scott Taylor as Pilot
- Stewart Ginn as Senator Anderson
- Thelma Scott as Lady Mayoress

== Episodes ==
Series	Episodes	Originally released		
Series	Episodes	First released	Last released	Network
1	6	26 April 1964	30 May 1964	Australian Broadcasting Commission
2	6	20 June 1965	25 July 1965	Australian Broadcasting Commission

=== Series 1 (1964) ===
No. overall	No. in series	Directed by	Written by	Original release date
1	1	Gil Brealey	G. K. Saunders	26 April 1964
A mysterious stranger appears on the doorstep of the Walsh family's home one stormy evening. With no memory of his own name or how he came to be there, the family shelter him for the night and he assumes the name Adam Suisse. Impressed by his advanced linguistic skills and intelligence, Mr Walsh offers Adam a teaching job. His teenage children Bernie and Jean, along with their friend Peter Cannon, discover a strange communication device among Adam's possessions.
2	2	Gil Brealey	G. K. Saunders	2 May 1964
Adam is away bushwalking in the Blue Mountains and the children break in to his room again. They find books that they think are strange. He comes back and later, he asks if they broke in. They say yes. He explains the books and says the device is a radio "for local broadcasts" and he has left it in the mountains where he stays. Bernard, one of the children says that flying saucers were seen at "Canley" in the Blue Mountains the last weekend. Adam says he did not know this. The next weekend he goes to Canley again. The children follow him on the next day's train. They are going to watch him. They go bushwalking and find labels from books from their school. They come across Swiss and then find a flying saucer ahead of them. A man comes out, sees them and shouts out to Adam in a strange language.
3	3	Gil Brealey	G. K. Saunders	9 May 1964
The children encounter Adam outside the flying saucer. Adam admits that the "machine" comes from his homeland. He admits he has not lost his memory but he wanted to live amongst them to learn things. He brings out the man from the flying saucer and says he is the pilot, Varossa. He then uses a form of hypnosis to convince the children to come with him to his homeland. They all get in the flying saucer. The next thing the Mr Walsh has reported the children as missing and the Police say they are just hiding. Mr Walsh receives a letter from Jean, postmarked Venezuela, in which she says she cannot explain what has happened and will return but she is not sure when. The letter was posted the day after they disappeared and took only four days to get to Australia. Meanwhile the children have been transferred from the flying saucer to another machine, the Mothership. Adam then "tells the truth" and tells a story about a planet where people lived but an accident happened that poisoned the planet. When the planet, Soshuniss, was poisoned, clever people went to one moon and survived. One thousand people wandered on the moon for a few centuries looking for a suitable planet. There are now only 300 people. Later Varossa explains about his first trip to Earth.
4	4	Gil Brealey	G. K. Saunders	16 May 1964
The children are now on the moon and meet some of the survivors, including the female leader, Soshun. Soshun reveals that Cinchy (spelling?), Adam's real name, will take the children back to Australia with Varossa. After the children leave her presence, Soshun talks to the elders in a way that implies some menace to Earth. They all return in the flying saucer and when back home, the children tell their parents about what has happened. They do not believe them. The Police arrive and question the children and the aliens. Suisse advises he does not know how old he is as they have no concept of years. Adam and Varossa are arrested. Mr Walsh contacts Professor Mayer who speaks to the children. He advises that he will make arrangements so that the children can secretly take him to the flying saucer. The next day they take the Professor to the flying saucer (wearing blacked out glasses so he does not know the location). Bernie shows the Professor how the saucer works and two uniformed Police arrive, they have followed them. While Peter and Jean restrain the Professor, Bernie pilots the saucer into the air.
5	5	Gil Brealey	G. K. Saunders	23 May 1964
After taking off in the flying saucer, the children contact the Soshun and speak to her via a video phone. They tell her what has happened and ask for her help. She sends a guide ship to them. Meanwhile, the two Police contact their superior who contacts the RAAF. The Captain advises the saucer is not theirs and they will act. The RAAF buzzes the flying saucer with jets. The Police advise Mr Walsh what has happened and that the security forces are now involved. The guide ship arrives. A pilot is transferred from the guide ship and takes over. The pilot cannot speak English. The RAAF pilot advises the Captain that they lost the two ships at 54,000 feet. The Professor and the children meet the Soshun and advises he will write letters for the children to post once they return to Earth. These will, he says, explain everything. The RAAF officers fly to Canberra and go to Parliament House to brief the Prime Minister. It is revealed that radar tracked the ships to 130 miles where they were joined by another larger vessel. They then went to 5,600 miles and then 50 to 60,000 miles where they landed on a small moon. The children return and are met by Police and Colonel Nash from "security". He questions the children. They tell him Professor Mayer has stayed on the Soshuniss to study them. Bernie advises the Colonel that the Soshunussi want to settle on Earth. Adam and Varossa escapes from the Police and asks Bernie to help hide them till he contacts the mothership to collect them. .
6	6	Gil Brealey	G. K. Saunders	30 May 1964
Bernie hides Adam and Varossa in the school's tower. The flying saucer lands at Idlewild Airport (looks like it was really the ABC Gore Hill property) and Professor Mayer gets out. He is taken away by some people in a large American car with UN stickers and the saucer departs. The children are questioned by the Police and Colonel Nash to find where Adam and Varossa are hiding. Professor Mayer is taken to the UN Headquarters in New York and presents the case that the aliens be permitted to land on Earth. He advises that they want to share their knowledge with all nations. Mayer phones Mr Walsh and speaks to Bernie, saying he must stop the aliens leaving in the flying saucer. It arrives to collect them and Bernie and Peter tell Adam and Varossa. The saucer leaves without them. Two Police officers pass them all over to Nash and the Chief Inspector. Nash advises that Adam and Varossa will be sent by plane to New York.

=== Series 2 (1965) ===
No. overall	No. in series	Directed by	Written by	Original release date
7	1	Gil Brealey	G. K. Saunders	20 June 1965
The news of the aliens has leaked and been published in the press in New York. US Senator Anderson is involved. It is decided to not send Adam to New York for the time being. The Walshs' house is under siege by the press. It is decided to let Adam and Varossa stay in the school play house. Meanwhile, Peter has snuck out and is trying to contact the mothership via the "radio". They hear him but there appears to be some conflict going on and they do not reply. Professor Mayer flies to Sydney with his son Edward. Apparently a new male Soshun has been elected who says the aliens must come to live on Earth. This happened because the old Soshun wanted Earth to invite them to come. The flying saucer lands in the school grounds. The pilot hypnotises Peter and makes him enter the saucer. They leave.
8	2	Gil Brealey	G. K. Saunders	27 June 1965
A very rich man, Rudolph Lindenberger II, comes to see Professor Mayer and tries to talk him into letting him get some sort of access to the aliens for monetary gain. Mayer goes to Sydney with his son. Back in Sydney there are people protesting outside the Walsh home, some for the aliens, some against. The flying saucer with Peter on board lands on the aliens' moon. The pilot takes him into a room in a cave where the new Soshun is in charge. The old Soshun comes in and talks to Peter. She explains what has happened and that she does not agree with the new Soshun's plan about Earth. This is to invade Earth if need be. She says they have one weapon. The new Soshun says he is keeping Peter on the moon as a hostage. Lindenberger buys all the other seats on the plane and flies to Sydney with Mayer and his son. Once in Sydney, they go to the Walsh house and then are advised that they are to drive to Parkes where the radio telescope is located. When a Police Sergeant goes to talk to Adam, he is hypnotised. The Senior Constable draws his gun on Varossa who hypnotises him. Adam advises that they are leaving. Adam then hypnotises the children and Edward Mayer. Adam and Varossa attempt to escape but Varossa is shot by a Policeman. Adam hijacks a car.
9	3	Gil Brealey	G. K. Saunders	4 July 1965
Varossa is taken to hospital. Colonel Nash's driver comes back and says he took Nash somewhere. This was really Adam, he too was hypnotised. Everyone leaves the Walsh house and they are followed by Linderberger's man Blake as well as media cars. Out in the bush they swap cars while Police pull over the media and Blake. Adam catches a train to Parkes. The car with everyone in it goes via Mudgee to Parkes. The Soshun says he wants to write a letter to the Prime Minister and will send it back with Peter to Parliament House. The Soshun sends his thoughts to Peter to put in the letter. They arrive at the Parkes Radio Telescope and Professor Mayer goes inside with Nash. A technician pulls apart the "radio" to try to discover the frequencies it uses so they can use the telescope to talk to the Soshuniss moon. The telescope is used to find the moon and seems to locate it.
10	4	Gil Brealey	G. K. Saunders	11 July 1965
Defence authorities in Australia have located the satellite Soshuniss using the Parkes radio telescope and Mayer is shocked to learn nuclear weapons will be used if hostilities arise. Adam communicates to Jean through a dream which directs her to a post office in Bunyul, a deserted mining town outside Parkes. Jean decides to sneak out of the Parkes compound and find Adam. Meanwhile Peter has been left comatose in the courtyard at Parliament House with a letter from the Soshun. This is taken to the Prime Minister's office while Peter is taken to hospital and then Sydney. Jean locates the post office and inside the postmaster has a letter for her. The letter has a map and instructions that Adam is hiding in a shed at the Bunyula Showground. Bernie and Edward meet Jean and they locate Adam's hideout. Here the children learn that Varossa was shot and captured by the Police. Adam asks them to bring him the radio which he can use to speak to the "little ship", one of which is always waiting nearby. They agree to get it. Lindenberger's man, Blake, follows them and overhears the conversation with Adam. Professor Mayer rebukes Colonel Nash about how they plan to treat the Soshunites. Nash says they will be telling the Sosunites what to do. The letter from the Soshun says that Peter's coma is a demonstration of their power. Edward tells his father about Varossa. Adam seems to sense that something has happened.
11	5	Gil Brealey	G. K. Saunders	18 July 1965
Lindenberger's henchman attempts to steal Adam's communication device from Professor Mayer at gunpoint, leading to Blake chasing Bernie across and over the radio telescope's dish. The dish is tilted right over so Bernie can step off while Blake is left hanging vertically at the top. Bernie runs away and returns the device to Adam who attempts to contact the Soshun. Mayer and the other children go to Adam too. The flying saucer receives the signal and is heading towards them. Blake is let off the dish and finds Adam. He tape records Mayer explaining that Peter was returned to Earth in a coma with a hostile threat from the Soshun and that the radio telescope is now being used to track Shosuniss so that it can be destroyed. Meyer volunteers to visit Soshuniss to act as a human shield in case of an attack from Earth. Adam also reveals that only a Soshunite scientist can bring Peter out of his coma. Blake goes back to Lindenberger with the tape recording. Lindenberger reveals that he had planned to take all the Soshunites to an island and when the moon was destroyed by the nuclear missiles, no-one would have known that they were on Earth. He says Mayer would also have been rich if he had played along. He decides to frame Mayer and make him appear to be a traitor. He also intends for Blake to kidnap Adam before Nash arrives at the hideout and arrests Mayer and the children. Lindenberger plays the tape to Nash. Adam reveals to Mayer that they have a secret weapon of some sort. As the Soshunite craft is landing, the henchman and Blake arrive and kidnap Adam. However, Adam hypnotises them and retrieves the radio from them. Mayer attempts to board the flying saucer but gets shot by Colonel Nash. The flying saucer takes off without Adam or Mayer.
12	6	Gil Brealey	G. K. Saunders	25 July 1965
Colonel Nash takes the wounded Mayer and Adam in his car to Lindenberger. Mr Walsh sneaks away and arrives in Canberra demanding a meeting with the Prime Minister advising that the weapon that the Soshunites have is their moon. They intend to smash it into Earth if they are not given a place to live. Adam contacts the Soshun again and tells them to destroy the radio telescope. The Soshunites use radio or sound waves to damage the radio telescope and prevent it from tracking Soshuniss. Adam and Dr Kamutsa, a representative of the Secretary-General of the UN and some others meet with the Prime Minister. The UN has delegated the role to negotiate to the PM. Adam uses the radio to speak to the Soshun and pass on the PM's request for a representative to visit the Soshun to discuss "a peaceful and harmonious end to this squabble". The Soshun advises he will negotiate only with the children, Jean, Bernie and Edward. The PM agrees to send the children with Dr Kamutsa to Sushuniss and tells Nash to make sure that the media know nothing of this till it is over. Adam advises that the children will be picked up from the radio telescope and the UN representative from Canberra. The children talk to the Soshun and Jean demands that first the Sushun must bring Peter out of his coma. He agrees to send a body healing scientist to Earth to fix Peter. Lindenberger offers the PM his private island as a settlement location for the Soshunites for his own gain, but is out-manoeuvred by the Prime Minister, forced to relinquish control of the island. A settlement agreement is finally reached but this is not shown. It is revealed by Adam that the moon could not have been crashed into the Earth successfully as it would have been smashed into small pieces when it came close and it could never have left as it does not have enough energy to pull away from the Earth's gravity. The following day Varossa and Adam are paraded down George Street to a civic reception held on the steps of Sydney Town Hall. Adam and Varossa arrive and sit with the Lord Mayor, the children and Mr Walsh at the stop of the steps. The flying saucer (the small ship) arrives with the Soshun. The Mayor welcomes the Soshunites to Sydney and Earth. Adam and Varossa climb into the flying saucer and take off, passing over the uncompleted Sydney Opera House. The Soshun stays behind.

== Adaptation ==
Over a decade after the series was produced, Saunders wrote a book adaptation which was published by Whitcombe & Tombs in 1978.
