= Candy Williams =

Australian actor

Claude "Candy" Williams (1929–1983) was an Aboriginal Australian musician, known for his country and western singing, often termed the Aboriginal country music. He was an active advocate for the advancement of his people, and also appeared in several television films and series.

== Early life ==
Claude Williams was born on Erambie Mission, near Cowra, New South Wales, in 1929.

== Career ==
In the 1960s, he appeared on a number of teen TV shows, and also toured with Jimmy Little's All Coloured Show.

Williams had recorded a number of albums by 1963, and had also acted in two films made for television. One of these was Burst of Summer, as Charlie (1961; based on the stage play by Oriel Gray), and he subsequently appeared in the television series Wandjina! and in two episodes of A Country Practice.

Williams' brother is musician Harry Williams, who sung in a musical duo with Wilga Munro (later his wife, known as Wilga Williams), and also with their band the Country Outcasts. Claude also played with the Country Outcasts, touring with them throughout New South Wales and Victoria.

Williams was a keen advocate for Aboriginal people, as a member of the Foundation for Aboriginal Affairs as well as the Federal Council for the Advancement of Aborigines and Torres Strait Islanders (usually known by its acronym FCAATSI).

== Recognition ==
- 2002: Posthumous Deadly Award, for Outstanding Contribution to Aboriginal Music

== Personal life and family ==
In 1957, he was best man at famous country singer Jimmy Little's wedding.

With his wife Hazel, he had a son and a daughter, Claude and Avril. His son is basketball player Claude Williams, who, on his appointment as head coach of the Sydney Kings, became the first and only Aboriginal basketball coach, and is an inductee of the Aboriginal and Torres Strait Islander Sports Hall of Fame.

He is first cousin to Harry Williams, the first Indigenous soccer player to represent the Socceroos at a World Cup, in 1974.

He lived in Sydney with his family, until his death in 1983 of a urinary tract infection.

== Selected filmography ==
- Burst of Summer (1961)
- The Sergeant from Burralee (1961)
- Wandjina! (1966)
- Top Mates (1979)
- A Country Practice
