= Wandjina! =

- Ad from The Age 30 May 1966
- Genre: Children's television
- Created by: G. K. Saunders
- Country of origin: Australia
- Original language: English
- No. of seasons: 1
- No. of episodes: 7

Production
- Cinematography: John Seale
- Running time: 30 minutes

Original release
- Network: ABC Television
- Release: 1966

Wandjina! was an Australian children's science fantasy television series produced by ABC Television and first aired in 1966. Its story, inspired by Dreamtime mythology of the spirit ancestors of the Kimberley region of north-West Australia, was about three teenagers caught up in an adventure linked to local sacred Aboriginal cave paintings of the Wandjina — the "people from the sky" who visited long ago, in the Dreamtime.

Wandjina! was the first drama production by ABC in Sydney that combined film and videotape footage.

== Synopsis ==
A team of scientists, including Miss Smith, venture into the Australian outback to investigate strange incidents. Donald MacPherson, a Scots-born anthropologist, discovers aboriginal cave paintings depicting mythical alien beings—the 'Wandjina', an extraterrestrial race that visited the ancient aborigines. Disturbing events suggest that not only are the beings real, they have not all left. Ann MacPherson, the anthropologist's daughter, and Linda, an aboriginal girl, explore the Wandjina caves near Booala Station and stumble upon a cave full of skeletons. They see some strange things: In one scene a mysterious hooded figure hunts kangaroos with a rod that strikes them down silently from a distance. The Wandjina resemble hooded monks with what look like life-support backpacks, similar to those used by astronauts. Their power base is a lighthouse-style tower above the farmland.

In one episode, gale-force winds occur when an elongated skull, the Wandjina Skull, is dug up from the sands.

== Cast ==
- David Yorston as Bruce
- Mark McManus as Donald MacPherson, an anthropologist
- Anne Haddy as Dr Smith, an intelligence agent
- Brian James as James MacPherson
- Bob Haddow as Sergeant Tom Hicks
- Jacki Weaver as Ann MacPherson
- John Gregg as 'Digger' Hilton
- Kit Taylor as Constable Jack Hankey
- Lou Vernon as Grandpa
- Lynne Murphy as Beth
- Julianna Allan as Linda
- John Armstrong as Gerry
- Don Pascoe as Captain Charles Raymond
- Candy Williams as Charlie
- Vlado Juris as Spaceman

== Production ==
The series was based on a radio serial, Country of the Skull, by G. K. Saunders, who had also written The Stranger.

White actor Julianna Allan was cast as an Aboriginal girl.

Filming began in September 1965 on location in Western New South Wales including Cooper's Creek and Broken Hill. It was also shot at the ABC studios.

== Reception ==
The Canberra Times said, "It is hard to chase the spectre of Blue Hills out of the mind. Whether teenagers will fall for it is doubtful. It could be that the producers have underestimated their sophistication. Linda, the aboriginal playmate of the station owner's daughter, Anne, looks just like what she is — a white girl with obvious make-up, (the blurb says they had trouble with this owing to water colour difficulties, and it is apparent on the screen); when she opens her mouth she sounds like a graduate from a specially selected girls' school. These two points combined don't add to the authenticity."
