= The Fire on the Snow =

Play written by Douglas Stewart

Fire on the Snow
- Wireless Weekly 7 June 1941
- Genre: verse drama play
- Running time: 60 mins (7:30 pm – 8:30 pm)
- Country of origin: Australia
- Language: English
- Home station: 2FC
- Syndicates: ABC
- Starring: Frank Harvey
- Written by: Douglas Stewart
- Directed by: Frank Clewlow
- Recording studio: Sydney
- Original release: June 8, 1941

The Fire on the Snow is a 1941 Australian verse play by Douglas Stewart about the Terra Nova Expedition to Antarctica by Robert Falcon Scott. It premiered on ABC radio on 6 June 1941 to great acclaim and inspired a series of Australian verse dramas on ABC radio.

The play was performed in Canada, England and New Zealand, and was an assigned text for the Leaving Certificate. It was also adapted into a stage version.

== Background ==
Exrtracts of the play were published in The Bulletin in 1939. Leslie Rees, the ABC's Drama Editor, read it and encouraged Stewart to turn it into a radio play.

Stewart said he wanted to write the play for radio "because I wanted to write a long poem about Scott, and this, short of finding a lunatic talkie director who would make a film with verse, dialogue and commentary, was the only way to do it. This commentator form, enabling the poet to speak directly to his audience and to present heroic or mythological themes that cannot very well be performed on the stage, is likely to have an increasing appeal to poets. Since the commentator is a sort of ‘chorus,’ the form of the play is very close to that of the ancient Greek dramas." He was influenced by the plays of Archibald Macleish.

Leslie Rees, the ABC's drama editor, called The Fire on the Snow the "finest-written radio play yet to have come out of Australia, and among the finest-written half-dozen from anywhere."

== Original 1941 Production ==
The original production of the plat was produced by Frank Clewlow and was to have starred Peter Finch as Scott, but he joined the army only four days before broadcast, so Frank Harvey replaced him. Clewlow decided to employ a female actor, Ida Osbourne, as narrator to contrast with the all-male cast. No copy of this original production exists.

The Bulletin said "it is more important as a poem than as a play, though the natural dramatic quality of what it treats of... the powerful statement it makes on a theme of supreme and absolute human heroism, and, as well, the strong reality in the cold awe of its setting, add up to uncommonly impressive radio drama."

The play prompted an enormous amount of correspondence. Leslie Rees responded saying he thought the production was "magnificent. I am convinced that Douglas Stewart's dramatic chronicle justified in the event every ounce of the preliminary praise I was in the position to give it. A large number of listeners thought the same and have said so, verbally or in letters."

The production was repeated in August 1941. The Fire on the Snow was called "the radio sensation of 1941."

== Original 1941 radio cast ==
- Frank Harvey as Robert Falcon Scott
- John Tate as Edward Adrian Wilson
- Lou Vernon as Lawrence Oates
- Peter Bathurst as Henry Bowers
- John Alden as Edgar Evans
- Ida Elizabeth Osbourne as narrator

== Subsequent productions ==
The Age 7 Nov 1955

The play has been performed on radio several times since including:

- 25 September 1942 ABC production with Peter Finch directed by Frank Clelow
- September 1944 - ABC production with John McCallum and Frank Harvey
- 1946 ABC production
- 1948 ABC production with Frank Harvey - called "a pleasant experience"
- 1948 Canadian production directed by Frank Clelow
- 1950 ABC production
- 1951 production directed by Tyrone Guthrie for the BBC starring John Mills (Scott) and Peter Finch
- 1953 - ABC production starring English actor Robert Speaight as Scott
- 1954 ABC production with Ray Barrett
- August 1955 - ABC production
- November 1955 - ABC production with Judith Anderson
- January 1958 - CBC production on CBC Wednesday Night
- April 1958 - ABC production in Brisbane
- 1959 - ABC production with Allan Trevor
- June 1962 ABC production
- July 1963 ABC production
- 1965 ABC production
- 1967 Canadian production CBM Midweek Theatre
- 1968 ABC production
- 1982 ABC production - done for the ABC's 50th anniversary
- 1984 ABC production
- 1989 ABC production

== Publication ==
The play was published in 1945.

== Stage version ==
Stewart adapted the play into a stage version that has been performed a number of times. Notable productions include:

- 1958 at Sydney University
- 1963 at Sydney's Independent Theatre
- 1965 at Sydney's Independent Theatre with Leonard Thiele
- 1968 at Sydney's Old Tote directed by Tom Lewis
