= Marjorie Stedeford =

Australian singer

Marjorie Torr Stedeford (1909 – 1959) was an Australian singer with a remarkably deep and soft voice, who had a successful career in London in the years immediately before the outbreak of World War II and on her return to Australia.

== Life and career ==
Marjorie was born and grew up in St Kilda, Victoria or Balaclava, Victoria the daughter of John Charles Stedeford (ca.1871 – 6 August 1918) and Edith Louisa Stedeford (née Torr) (1876 – 26 June 1950) who were married on 31 January 1900. She had two sisters; Stella "Annie" Maxwell (9 December 1900 – 1972), who was born at Chiltern, Victoria and married John McNeill Fraser on 9 July 1889 and Edith May (1903 – 11 August 1944) later Mrs. Jack Lindsay Davis.

She studied music and was active in sports, and was reputedly the first Australian woman water-skier.

Her musical career began in Melbourne around 1920, and by 1932 was singing on the radio with Cecil Fraser's Melbourne ABC Dance Band. In 1935 she sailed for London, ostensibly on holiday but with some help from music critic Stan Patchett (a fellow Australian), her unique 'baritone' voice commanded attention. She cut a few records for Columbia and appeared on the BBC singing "The Man I Love", and was interviewed by Susan Collyer for the magazine Radio Pictorial. She sang with bands led by Jack Jackson and Brian Lawrance, and was favourably reviewed by Melody Maker (whose readers' survey ranked her fourth amongst singers in 1937) and the Daily Mirror.

She left Britain around 1938 for a short holiday in Florida, and with the outbreak of World War II returned to Melbourne, arriving in December 1939 and immediately won a contract with the ABC. She married Shay Sydney Gordon around 1940. They had a son Christopher in October 1941 and a home in Toorak, Victoria.

At various times she had her own backing groups, as "Marjorie Stedeford and her Rhythm Boys" and "Margaret Stedeford and her Mood Makers" (actually the Parker Sisters).

She was a regular on the 2GB program Calling the Stars, and hosted her own shows on 3AR. She also acted in several radio plays.

== Sources ==
Laird, Ross, Marjorie Stedeford in London 1935 – 1937, liner notes to ScreenSound Australia album (CD/SSA/CD0020)

== Discography ==
Marjorie Stedeford in London 1935–1937 Body and Soul, Screensound Australia, 2000, Recurrent (CD/SSA/CD0020)
