= Nina Murdoch =

Australian writer and journalist

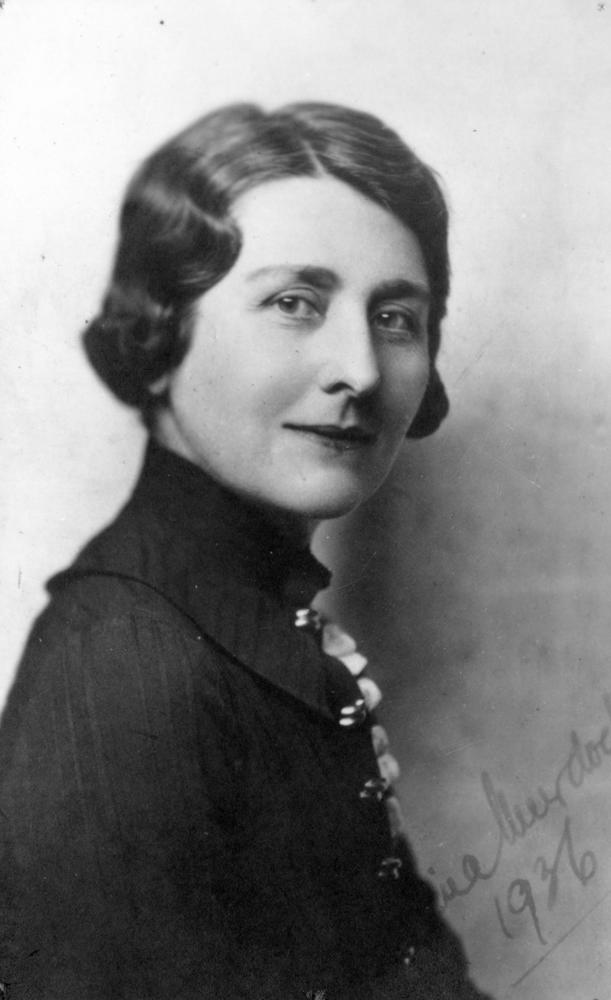

Madoline "Nina" Murdoch (19 October 1890 – 16 April 1976), also known by her married name Madoline Brown and pen name Manin, was an Australian writer and journalist, best known for her biographies and poetry, and travel writings, as well as a radio broadcaster and teacher. She was author of half a dozen books but remembered today for forming the Argonauts Club, which in a second incarnation (but largely following her vision) was to have a significant influence on postwar Australian culture.

== Biography ==
Nina was born as Madoline Murdoch, the third daughter of John Andrew Murdoch, a Law Clerk, from North Carlton, Victoria, and his wife Rebecca Murphy. The family moved to Woodburn, New South Wales, where Nina grew up, attending first a school where her mother taught, then Sydney Girls' High School; it was here that her interest in writing began. She began her working life teaching with her mother, then at Sydney Boys' Preparatory School. She then secured a position with the Sydney Sun as one of its first women reporters, and became the first woman to cover Senate debates. She married fellow reporter (and ex-teacher) James Duncan McKay Brown on 19 December 1917. They moved to Victoria, both working on Melbourne's Sun News-Pictorial, Nina often under the byline 'Manin'. In 1927 she travelled unaccompanied through England and Europe, gathering material for the first of her travel books Seventh Heaven.

On her return, she joined the Melbourne Herald, but was retrenched because of the Depression. She gave travel talks on radio 3LO, and when that station was acquired for the Australian Broadcasting Commission (ABC) in 1932, ran the Children's Corner. It was then she came up with the idea of the Argonauts' Club. It was a bold concept: publishing original contributions from children who would remain anonymous under assigned Ship names and numbers; treating children as creative individuals in contrast to the pandering to trivial enthusiasms which was general then as now. She wrote its pledge, inscribed on every membership certificate: "I vow to stand faithfully by all that is brave and beautiful; to seek adventure, and having discovered aught of wonder or delight, of merriment or loveliness, to share it freely with my comrades".

James Brown secured a job with News Ltd in Adelaide in 1933. Nina followed in 1934 and with her departure, the Argonauts' Club folded. It was however revived in 1941 and ran successfully till 1972.

She returned to Melbourne around 1943 where she devoted herself to the care of her mother, by now blind, (and lived to 105) and her asthmatic husband who died in 1957.

A 1920 portrait of Nina Murdoch, by Sir John Longstaff, hangs in the reading room of the National Library, Canberra. He was to become, in 1948, the subject of her only biography. She died at an Anglican nursing home in Camberwell.

== Societies ==
Murdoch was a member of the Lyceum Club, the Incorporated Society of Authors, Playwrights and Composers (London) and the Fellowship of Australian Writers.

== Publications ==
Murdoch was a prolific writer of poetry; between 1913 and 1922 The Bulletin published some 80 of her poems, including several as 'Manin', and was the recipient of many of their prizes.

- Songs of the Open Air (book of verse); William Brooks, 1915
- More Songs in the Open Air; Robertson and Mullens, 1922
- The Miss Emily trilogy:

Miss Emily in Black Lace; Halstead Press, Sydney 1930
Portrait of Miss Emily Halstead Press, Sydney 1931
Exit Miss Emily Halstead Press, Sydney 1937

- She travelled alone in Spain (ill. Victor MacClure); George G. Harrap, 1935
- Tyrolean June, A Summer Holiday in Austrian Tyrol; George G. Harrap, 1936
- Vagrant in Summer, Holiday Memories of Nine European Towns; George G. Harrap, 1937
- Portrait in Youth, A Biography of John Longstaff. Angus and Robertson, Sydney 1948
