= The Silver Box =

1906 play by John Galsworthy

The Silver Box is a three-act comedy, the first play by the English writer John Galsworthy. It was originally produced in London in 1906, and attracted much attention. In New York it was first seen in 1907.

In the play, the disappearance of a cigarette box (the silver box) leads to a comparison of the behaviour of the son of a prosperous politician, with that of an unemployed man, and the exposure of attitudes of different social classes.

== History ==
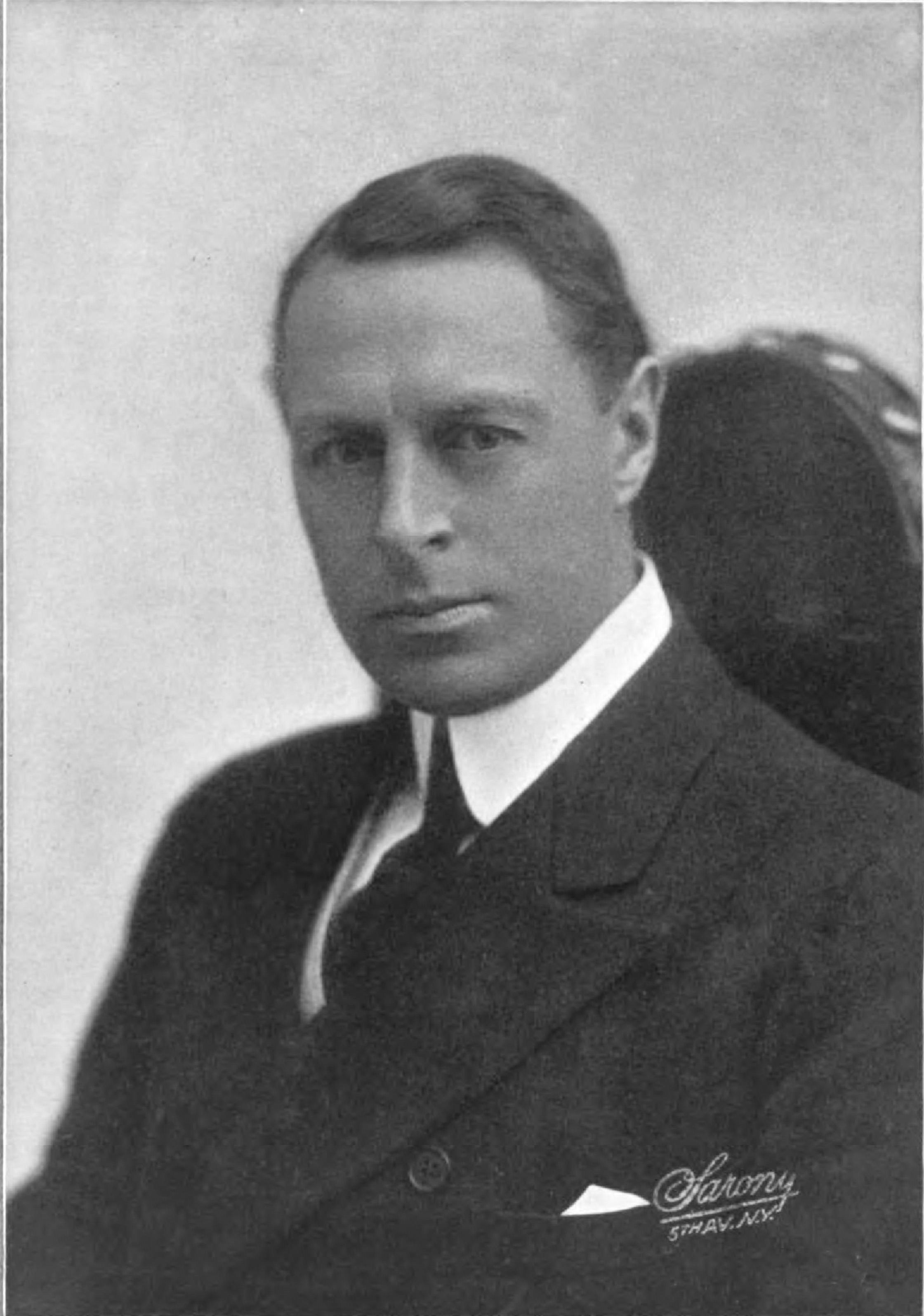
Bruce McRae in 1909: he played Jones in the first New York production.

Galsworthy said that his aim was "to create such an illusion of actual life passing on the stage as to compel the spectator to pass through an experience of his own, to think and talk and move with the people he sees thinking and talking and moving in front of him."

The Silver Box was first produced on 25 September 1906 at the Royal Court Theatre in London. The play was among several new plays at this theatre from 1904 to 1907 directed by J. E. Vedrenne and Harley Granville-Barker, by notable dramatists including George Bernard Shaw. Although The Silver Box did not draw large audiences, it was much discussed.

It was first seen in New York on 18 March 1907 at the Empire Theatre. It was produced by Charles Frohman and featured Bruce McRae as Jones and Ethel Barrymore as Mrs. Jones. Critics praised Ethel Barrymore's performance, but audiences preferred to see her in more glamorous parts. There were only 20 performances.

== Original cast ==
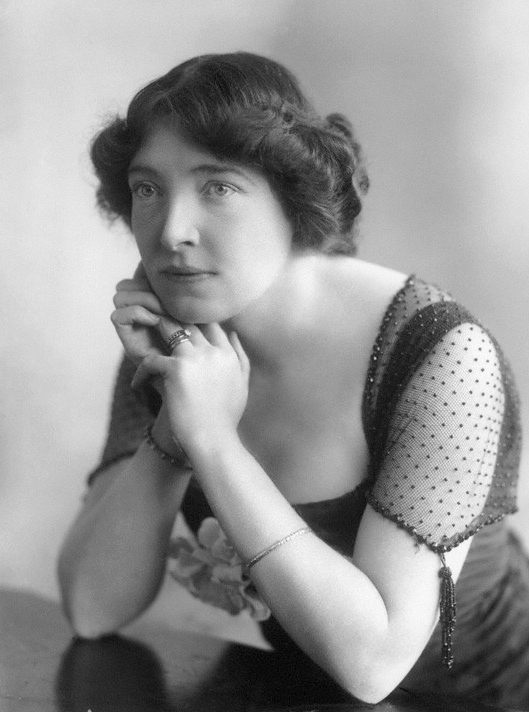
Irene Rooke in 1913: she played Mrs. Jones in the original production.

Principal members of the original cast on 25 September 1906 at the Royal Court Theatre:

- John Barthwick, M. P. – James Hearn
- Mrs. Barthwick – Frances Ivor
- Jack Barthwick – A. E. Matthews
- Mrs. Jones – Irene Rooke
- Jones – Norman McKinnel
- An Unknown Lady – Sydney Fairbrother

== Synopsis ==
Act I, Scene I

The three scenes of the first Act take place in the London dining room of John Barthwick, a Liberal member of parliament.

Jack Barthwick, son of the family, comes home at night drunk, carrying a lady's reticule (handbag). Jones, whose wife is the charwoman for the Barthwicks, has helped him to unlock the door, and is given a drink by Jack. Jack falls asleep on the sofa; Jones takes a purse that has fallen from the reticule, and a silver box – a cigarette box – and leaves.

Act I, Scene II

The next morning, Jack is still on the sofa. While Mrs. Jones is cleaning the room, she talks to Wheeler, the housemaid, and to Marlow, the butler, about her husband: he is out of work, and is violent when he is drunk. Marlow notices that the cigarette box is missing.

Act I, Scene III

John Barthwick and his wife, having breakfast, talk about politics: she is alarmed on reading in the newspaper that a Labour candidate has won a by-election, but he says that all parties should be represented.

An unknown lady calls. She is the young lady whom Jack met last evening; she is anxious to have her purse back, to pay the rent. Jack finds that there is no purse in the reticule, and denies having it. Barthwick reluctantly gives the lady some money, and talks severely to Jack after she leaves.

Marlow informs Barthwick that the cigarette box is missing; there is a suspicion that Mrs. Jones stole it. Barthwick interviews Mrs. Jones, and learns of her troubled domestic situation. She knows nothing about the missing cigarette box.

Act II, Scene I

In the Jones's lodgings, Jones complains to his wife that he is badly treated when he tries to find work. She says that they have to pay the rent today; when the landlady comes for the rent, Jones unexpectedly throws his wife a sovereign to pay it. Mrs. Jones is appalled to find he has a purse and the missing cigarette box. Jones says "I'm no thief. I'm no worse than wot that young Barthwick is; he brought 'ome that purse I picked up – a lady's purse – 'ad it off 'er in a row, kept sayin' 'ed scored 'er off. Well, I scored 'im off.... And d'you think anything'll happen to him?"

Snow, a detective, enters and finds the cigarette box he is looking for. He assumes Mrs. Jones stole it, and arrests her. Jones, saying he took the box himself, attacks Snow, and a policeman comes in to overpower Jones.

Act II, Scene II

In the Barthwicks' dining room that evening, Mr. and Mrs. Barthwick and Jack are having dessert.

Snow comes in. His report, that Jones says he took the box when he was let in by a drunken Jack, and that Jones had the purse, causes dismay and embarrassment. Snow says Jones should be prosecuted: Barthwick says, as he looks gloomily at Jack, "This prosecution goes very much against the grain with me. I have great sympathy with the poor. In my position I'm bound to recognise the distress there is amongst them."

Roper, Barthwick's lawyer, wants to know how to present the case in the police court. Mrs. Barthwick believes that Jack's involvement is an invention of Jones; Jack is unwilling to appear in court; Barthwick is anxious that the details should not get into the papers.

Act III

In the police court, Mrs. Jones says she was shocked that her husband had the box. Jones says he helped young Mr. Barthwick to unlock the door, and that Jack said to him, "You look... like one of these 'ere Socialists. Take whatever you like." Jones says he took the box out of spite. Jack, questioned by Roper, says he does not remember Jones letting him in.

Barthwick does not press charges, and Mrs. Jones is discharged. Jones, who has pleaded guilty to stealing the box and assaulting the police, is told that being drunk is no excuse, and is given one month in prison. As he leaves he shouts resentfully at Jack, who took the purse while drunk but has not got into trouble with the law.

== Television ==
The play has been adapted for television:

In 1939 it was a BBC play: it featured Gibb McLaughlin as John Barthwick, Basil Langton as Jack Barthwick, Leon M. Lion as Jones and Louise Hampton as Mrs. Jones.

In 1949 it was a BBC play, produced by Fred O'Donovan. It featured Arthur Young as John Barthwick, Derek Blomfield as Jack Barthwick, Edmund Willard as Jones and Nancy Price as Mrs. Jones.

In 1955 it was a Pond's Theater play, featuring Tom Helmore and Roddy McDowall.

In 1959 it was a BBC play, directed by Michael Leeston-Smith.
