= Tom Stanley Hepworth =

Australian teacher, author and editor

- Born: 29 June 1916; Brisbane, Queensland, Australia
- Died: 1 September 1985 (aged 69); Hornsby, New South Wales, Australia
- Education: Harvard University (D.Ed.)
- Occupations: Teacher, author, editor
- Writing career
- Notable works: Castaways of the Monoboola, Dyslexia: The Problem of Reading Retardation

Tom Stanley Hepworth D.Ed. (29 June 1916 – 1 September 1985) was an Australian teacher, author and editor.

== History ==
Hepworth was born in Brisbane, Queensland to Tom Hepworth and his wife Martha May Hepworth, née Russell (1881–1966), of "The Palms", Park Road, South Brisbane. His father died when Tom was quite young; his mother married again, to William Robert McGregor (died 1948).

He began his working life as a teacher at Colamba, near Chinchilla, Queensland. By 1948 he was senior History and Economics master at Brisbane Grammar School and undertook further studies in education at Harvard University, from where he graduated as Doctor of Education.

In 1951 he was appointed Education Officer with the Commonwealth Office of Education.

He was employed as editor by Educational Press, of Sydney, and was responsible for the Australian Children's Newspaper (1953– ) and The ABC Children's Hour Annual #1–#5 (1956–58, 1960–61), and The Australian Children's Annual #6–#8 (1963–65). Monty Wedd was a frequent collaborator.

In 1960 he established the Australian Reading Research Foundation to investigate and treat dyslexia.

He died in Hornsby, New South Wales

== Family ==
Hepworth married Edna Olive Wilton on 16 January 1941; they had at least one son.

== Bibliography ==
- Hepworth, T. S. Castaways of the Monoboola: A story for boys (1948)
- Hepworth, T. S. Religion and education in the Queensland social order: a history of the development of a system of public education in Queensland with special reference to the relationship between church and state throughout this development (1953) Thesis (D.Ed.), Graduate School of Education, Harvard University
- Hepworth, T. S. Adventure of the Outcasts (1956) appeared in A.B.C. Children's Hour Annual #1, pp. 25–27
- Hepworth, T. S. Dyslexia: The Problem of Reading Retardation (1971)
