= Alastair Duncan (actor, born 1926) =

British actor

- Alastair Duncan in a guest role in TV series Home and Away as Antonio Lucini
- Born: 2 July 1926; Ilford, Essex, England
- Died: 3 August 2005; Woy Woy, New South Wales, Australia
- Education: Royal Academy of Dramatic Art
- Occupation: Actor
- Years active: 1943–2002

Alastair Duncan (2 July 1926 – 3 August 2005), also credited as Alistair Duncan, was an English-born actor, playwright, producer and director. He was best known for his work as an actor in radio, but also in theatre and television in series and TV movies, both in his native England, Australia and the United States.

Duncan guest starred in the series Home and Away, and was described by early regular star Judy Nunn, as the Shakespeare of Radio Drama

== Early life ==
Duncan was born in Ilford, Essex, England. At the age of 16, he won a scholarship to London's Royal Academy of Dramatic Art, graduating with a Diploma and the Herbert Tree Shakespeare Award. He performed for several seasons at London's Arts Theatre, before being called upon to join the British Army, which saw him posted to the Middle East, Germany and Austria for a period of three years, during which time he served with the troops entertainment unit, Stars in Battledress.

== Career ==
After being demobilised from the army, Duncan worked in radio as a member of the BBC Repertory Company for three years, and performed in several West End productions including Fanny's First Play and The Bread-Winner at the Arts Theatre, playing the role of Tim.

In 1951, Duncan relocated to Sydney, Australia, where he immediately landed radio work with Australian Broadcasting Commission, the day after his arrival. He starred in the radio series Dr Paul, in the titular role, and played lead roles in several other commercial radio serials. From 1951, he also appeared in numerous theatre roles, including playing Puck in Shakespeare's A Midsummer Night's Dream to largely (but not exclusively) school student audiences in 1951 and 1952 at the Theatre Royal in Adelaide.

In 1954, Duncan left for the US, where he performed as a regular in Lux Radio Theatre in Los Angeles, acting alongside Tyrone Power and Joan Crawford. For five years he starred in radio in New York, with lead roles in two long-running US national radio serials and the international The CBS Mystery Half Hour. He also appeared on Broadway in a 1957 production of the play Under Milk Wood.

Duncan returned to Australia in 1959 and began starring as Captain Bligh in ABC television serial Stormy Petrel. In 1962, he played Captain Robert Robison in ten-part historical miniseries The Patriots. The following year, he presented Time Out, an Australian television series in which actors portrayed Australian historical figures, who were 'interviewed' by Duncan. The series lasted 26 episodes, after which a spin-off Tribunal was produced, from 1963 to 1964. Once again, Duncan hosted, this time interrogating the actions of controversial historical figures (such as Brutus, General Custer, Lizzie Borden and Richard III) as portrayed by actors including Ruth Cracknell and Ron Haddrick.

Duncan was chairman of Australian Theatre for Young People (ATYP) when its first committee was formed in 1963. He became artistic director of Killara Memorial Hall in Sydney in 1973, renaming it Marian Street Theatre the following year. For eight years, he managed the venue, helping establish it as a hub for Australian talent, appearing in and directing productions throughout the 1970s and 1980s.

After radio drama became less popular, Duncan also voiced TV and radio commercials, narrated documentaries and presented on the Discovery Channel. He also continued to perform in television and for the stage. From 1972 to 1973, he voiced the lead character of Phileas Fogg in two seasons of NBC animated series Around the World in Eighty Days. It was the first Australian-produced cartoon to be broadcast on American network television.

In 1984, Duncan appeared in the AFI Award-winning drama film Annie's Coming Out, alongside Angela Punch McGregor and Bud Tingwell. Later in his career, Duncan also appeared in the long-running television soap opera Home and Away.

In 2004, Actors' Blood, Duncan's book about the Fullers (his wife Virginia's family), pioneers of the Australian and New Zealand entertainment industry, was published.

== Personal life and death ==
In 1958, Duncan married Diana Sharpe, with whom he worked alongside at the Australian Theatre for Young People. The couple had a son and a daughter, but the marriage ended in divorce in 1982.

Duncan married his second wife, Virginia Fuller, granddaughter of theatre entrepreneur Sir Benjamin Fuller in 1993.

Duncan died in 2005, at the age of 79.

== Filmography ==
=== Film ===
Title	Year	Role	Type
1953	El Alaméin	Australian (uncredited)	Feature film
1964	Pattern of Life	Narrator	Short film
1964	The Aborigines of Australia	Commentator	Short film
1965	Man and a Mural	Commentator	Short film
1971	Demonstrator	Ted Pacard	Feature film
1977	The Reef	Explorer (voice)	Film
1982	Heatwave	American Speaker	Feature film
1983	On the Run (aka Nowhere to Hide)	Mr. Jabert	Feature film
1984	Fast Talking	School Inspector	Feature film
1984	A Test of Love (aka Annie's Coming Out)	Hopgood	Feature film

=== Television ===
Title	Year	Role	Type
1954	Great Expectations		Robert Montgomery Presents, TV play, 2 episodes
1959	Lady in Danger	Andy Meade	TV play
1959	A Tongue in Silver	Willy Figg	Shell Presents, TV play
1960	Stormy Petrel	Edmund Griffin	Miniseries, 10 episodes
1961	The Sergeant from Burralee	Thomas Morland	TV play
1961	La Boheme		TV play
1961	The Big Client	David Mason	TV play
1962	Land of Smiles	Sou-Chong	TV movie
1962	Funnel Web	Paul Charlton	TV play
1962	The Patriots	Captain Robert Robison	Miniseries, 7 episodes
1963	Time Out	Interviewer	16 episodes
1963–1964	Tribunal	Interviewer	22 episodes
1964	I Have Been Here Before	Dr Gortler	TV play
1964	A Season in Hell	Paul Verlaine	Wednesday Theatre, TV play
1964	The Four-Poster	Michael	TV play
1967	Love and War	Phanocles	1 episode
1967–1971	Homicide	Anthony Reid / Godfrey Abbott / Timothy Bryant / John Gardiner	4 episodes
1968	Hunter	Tamas Spivak / Marriott	2 episodes
1968	Contrabandits	Blind Cyril / Darnell / Hauschild	3 episodes
1969	I've Married A Bachelor	Joe Garibaldi	1 episode
1969	Riptide	Harry	1 episode
1969	Division 4	Jack Parsons	1 episode
1969	Voyage Out	Eddy	Australian Plays, TV play
1970	The Link Men		1 episode
1972	The Survivor		TV movie
1972	The Money Game	The Financier (voice)	TV movie
1972	Lane End	Spyros	Miniseries
1972	Number 96	Vernon Saville	10 episodes
1972	Elephant Boy	Jaffne	1 episode
1972	Robinson Crusoe	Voice	Animated TV movie
1972	The Prince and the Pauper	Voice	Animated TV movie
1972	Yeoman and the Guard		Animated TV movie
1972	Travels of Marco Polo	Voice	Animated TV movie
1972	Birds in the Bush (aka The Virgin Fellas)	Hoffnung	13 episodes
1972–1973	Around the World in Eighty Days	Phileas Fogg (voice)	Animated series, 17 episodes
1973	Kidnapped	Voice	Animated TV movie
1973	The Swiss Family Robinson	Voice	Animated TV movie
1973	The Black Arrow	Voice	Animated TV movie
1973	The Gentlemen of Titipu	Voice	Animated TV movie
1975	The Mysterious Land	Voice	Animated TV movie
1975	Ivanhoe	Voice	Animated TV movie
1976	Shannon's Mob		1 episode
1976	The Africans	Narrator	TV movie
1977	A Journey to the Center of the Earth	Voice	Animated TV movie
1977	Moby-Dick	Voice	Animated TV movie
1979	The First Christmas	Voice	Animated TV movie
1981	Holiday Island	Tom Ballantine	1 episode
1981–1983	Cop Shop	Georges Bakos / John Corsini	2 episodes
1982–1983	A Country Practice	Mr. Bourke	10 episodes
1984	The Adventures of Huckleberry Finn	Jim (voice)	Animated TV movie
1985	20,000 Leagues Under the Sea	Voice	Animated TV movie
1987	Vietnam	Ambassador Anderson	Miniseries
1988	Rafferty's Rules	Rex Jacobi	1 episode
1988	The Dirtwater Dynasty	Doctor	Miniseries, 1 episode
1988	True Believers	Sir William Owen	Miniseries, 2 episodes
1988	Classic Adventure Stories: Robinson Crusoe	Voice	Animated TV movie
1988	The Rainbow Warrior Conspiracy	Hernu	TV movie
1989	The Hijacking of the Achille Lauro	Mossad Officer	TV movie
1990; 2002	Home and Away	Antonio Lucini / Judge Williamson / District Court Judge	7 episodes
1991	The Emperor's New Clothes	Voice	Animated TV movie
1991	Ring of Scorpio	Mr. Watts	Miniseries, 4 episodes
1992	Six Pack	Meir	1 episode
1993–1998	Australia's Most Wanted	Narrator	4 episodes
1995	Echo Point	Magistrate	1 episode
1996	The Hunchback of Notre Dame	Voice	Animated TV movie
1996	Camelot	Voice	Animated TV movie
1998	A Difficult Woman	Honoure De Grasset	Miniseries, 3 episodes
2002	Family Law	Professor Hellmouth	1 episode

== Video game ==
Title	Year	Role	Type
2000	Warlords Battlecry	Voice	Video game

== Theatre ==
=== As actor ===
Title	Year	Role	Type	Ref.
1943–1944	A Trip to Scarborough		Theatre Royal, Bristol, Arts Theatre, London	
1944	Mine Hostess	Fabrizio	Arts Theatre, London	
1951–1952	A Midsummer Night's Dream	Puck	Theatre Royal, Adelaide	
	Fanny's First Play		West End, London	
1953	The Bread-Winner	Tim	Arts Theatre, London	
1953	Metropolitan Merry-Go-Round		Metropolitan Theatre, Sydney	
1957	Under Milk Wood	Mog Edwards / The Guide Book / Lord Cut-Glass / Utah Watkins	Henry Miller's Theatre, Broadway	
1962	Beyond the Fringe		Phillip St Theatre, Sydney	
1965	The Representative		UNSW Old Tote Theatre, Sydney	
1965	Two Plays (in rehearsal)		Independent Theatre, Sydney	
1965	The Fire on the Snow (in rehearsal)		Independent Theatre, Sydney	
1966	The Deadly Game		Independent Theatre, Sydney	
1966	A Far Country		Independent Theatre, Sydney	
1966	Luv		Phillip St Theatre, Sydney	
1968	The Explorers	Marionette voices	Australian tour with Marionette Theatre	
1971	The Canterbury Pilgrims	Reciter	Albert Hall, Canberra	
1974	The Chinese Prime Minister		Marian St Theatre, Sydney	
1975	Irma La Douce		Marian St Theatre, Sydney	
1975	The Cool Duenna		Marian St Theatre, Sydney	
1976	The Formation Dancers		Marian St Theatre, Sydney	
1976	Cole		Marian St Theatre, Sydney	
1980	The Breadwinner	Charles	Marian St Theatre, Sydney	

=== As writer / director ===
Title	Year	Role	Type
1965	The Servant of Two Masters	Director	Hurstville Civic Centre, Mosman Town Hall, Parramatta Town Hall & Killara Soldiers Memorial Hall
1968	The Runaway Steamboat	Director	Australia Hall, Adelaide
1968	The Dragon's Holiday	Director / Playwright	Phillip St Theatre, Sydney & Westfield Hornsby
1968	The Emperor's Nightingale	Adaptor / Director	Phillip St Theatre, Sydney
1969	The Barber and the Donkey	Playwright	Westfield Hornsby
1969	Treasure Island	Director	UNSW Parade Theatre, Sydney
1969	Dick Whittington	Director / Music & lyrics	UNSW Parade Theatre, Sydney
1970	The Prince and The Firebird	Director	UNSW Parade Theatre, Sydney
1971	Remarkable Handcart	Director	UNSW Parade Theatre, Sydney
1971	The Mystery of Stanley Barlingbone	Playwright	UNSW Parade Theatre, Sydney
1972	Tinker, Tailor, Soldier, Sailor	Director / Playwright	UNSW Parade Theatre, Sydney
1972	Blop Goes the Weazel	Director	UNSW Parade Theatre, Sydney
1973	The Dragon's Holiday	Playwright	Bailey Hall, Chatswood
1973	The Emperor's Nightingale	Adaptor	Bailey Hall, Chatswood
1973	The Dragon, The Donkey and The Nightingale	Adaptor / Director / Playwright	Bailey Hall, Chatswood
1973	Blithe Spirit	Director	Playhouse Canberra
1974	Cowardy Custard	Director	Playhouse Canberra & Marian St Theatre, Sydney
1974	Home and Beauty	Director	Playhouse Canberra & Marian St Theatre, Sydney
1974	Don't Listen Ladies!	Director	Marian St Theatre, Sydney
1974	The Chinese Prime Minister	Director	Marian St Theatre, Sydney
1975	Semi-Detached	Director	Marian St Theatre, Sydney
1975	The Cool Duenna	Director	Marian St Theatre, Sydney
1975	The Sunshine Boys	Director	Marian St Theatre, Sydney
1975	On Monday Next	Director	Marian St Theatre, Sydney
1976	I Do! I Do!	Director	Marian St Theatre, Sydney
1976	The Formation Dancers	Director	Marian St Theatre, Sydney
1976	Dry Run	Director	Marian St Theatre, Sydney
1976	Cole	Director	Marian St Theatre, Sydney
1976	Getting On	Director	Marian St Theatre, Sydney
1977	Something's Afoot	Director	Marian St Theatre, Sydney
1977	The Happy Hunter	Director	Marian St Theatre, Sydney
1977	Away Match	Director	Marian St Theatre, Sydney
1977	A Funny Thing Happened on the Way to the Forum	Director	Marian St Theatre, Sydney
1978	Edith Piaf	Director	Marian St Theatre, Sydney
1978	Journey's End	Director	Marian St Theatre, Sydney
1978	What Every Woman Knows	Director	Marian St Theatre, Sydney
1978	A Lad 'n' His Lamp	Director	Marian St Theatre, Sydney
1979	Ten Times Table	Director	Marian St Theatre, Sydney
1979	Fanny	Director	Marian St Theatre, Sydney
1979	The Druid's Rest	DIrector	Marian St Theatre, Sydney
1979	Seesaw	Dialect Coach	Marian St Theatre, Sydney
1980	Rum for your Money	Director	Marian St Theatre, Sydney
1980	Shock!	Director	Marian St Theatre, Sydney
1980	Family Circles	Director	Marian St Theatre, Sydney
1980	Kiss Me, Kate	Director	Marian St Theatre, Sydney

== Radio ==
Title	Year	Role	Type	Ref.
1949	The Lady Vanishes	Caldicott	Saturday Night Theatre on BBC Home Service	
1949	The Winter’s Tale		BBC Radio	
1950	The Case		Radio Playhouse on BBC Radio	
Early 1950s	Tick Tock Tales		2UW Sydney	
1950s	Captain Starlight		BBC Radio Drama Light	
1951	The Golden Cockerel	Alexander Pushkin	ABC Radio	
1952	Jemmy Green in Australia	Jemmy	ABC Radio	
1952	The Divorce of Lady X	Logan	ABC Radio	
1952	I Tell My Story	Narrator	ABC Radio	
1952	Ralph Rashleigh	Reader	ABC Radio	
1953	Tailormade	Ciccio	ABC Radio	
1953	The Birds	BBC Announcer	Lux Radio Theatre on NBC Blue Network	
1953	Breaking the Sound Barrier		Lux Radio Theatre on NBC Blue Network	
1953	John Hayes, His Head and How They Were Parted	John Hayes	Crime Classics on CBS Radio	
1953	Mr Throwers Hammer		Crime Classics on CBS Radio	
1953	The Hangman and William Palmer Who Won		Crime Classics on CBS Radio	
1953	Blackbeard's 14th Wife Why She Was No Good for Him	Maynard	Crime Classics on CBS Radio	
1953	Escape the Out Station		Escape on CBS Radio	
1953	The Thirteenth Truck		Escape on CBS Radio	
1953	Marcus Whitman		Hallmark Hall of Fame	
1953	Moonstone		Suspense on CBS Radio, 2 episodes	
1953–	Alias the Baron	John Mannering		
Mid-1950s	The CBS Mystery Half Hour		CBS Radio	
1954	The Day The Earth Stood Still		Lux Radio Theatre on NBC Blue Network	
1954	The Winslow Boy		Lux Radio Theatre on NBC Blue Network	
1954	Mississippi Gambler		Lux Radio Theatre on NBC Blue Network	
1954	James Evans, Fireman: He Extinguished a Human Torch	James Evans	Crime Classics on CBS Radio	
1954	How Supan Got The Hook Outside Bombey	Major Allison	Crime Classics on CBS Radio	
1954	Roger Nems, How He Thought Dead Won the Game		Crime Classics on CBS Radio	
1954	Incredible History of John Shepard		Crime Classics on CBS Radio	
1954	Bernard Baruch, an Incident in Paris		Hallmark Hall of Fame	
1954	The Hand That Rocked the Cradle		Inheritance on NBC Radio	
1954	Crime and Punishment	Rodion Raskolnikov	ABC Radio	
1955	Starlight Theatre			
1956	A Gun for Dinosaur	Reginald Rivers	X Minus One on NBC Radio	
1956	Project Trojan		X Minus One on NBC Radio	
1957	Early Model		X Minus One on NBC Radio	
1959	Kind Hearts and Coronets	Louis Mazzini	ABC Radio	
1959	The Critical Point	Dr Mortimer	ABC Radio	
1959	A Death Out of Season	William Armitage	ABC Radio	
1959	Orphan Island		ABC Radio	
1959	Plot on the Moon	Herbert Hoidern	ABC Radio	
1950s–1960s	Diamonds of Death	Leonardo Donatelli		
1960s	Borrasca			
1960s	From Paris with Love	Hilary Lawford		
1960s	Sound of Thunder	Edward Enger		
1960s	Abel Cain Investigates			
1961	The Death of a Wombat	Narrator	ABC Radio	
1963	The Quiet Stranger	Karl Ellman		
1963	Desiree	Napoleon Bonaparte		
1964	The Rose Garden		ABC Radio	
1966	The Shame of Sefton Ridge	Anson Page	BBC Radio	
1979	Amphitryon 38	Mercury	ABC Radio	
1979	The Fire on the Snow	Narrator	ABC Radio	
1979	A Wicked Pack of Cards	Sheik Kamal	ABC Radio	
1979	What Price Glory?	Captain Flagg	ABC Radio	
	Dr. Paul	Dr Paul	2UW	
	The Image of Dorinda	Jeff Baylis		
