= Come In on This =

- Genre: Talk show
- Presented by: Robert Peach
- Country of origin: Australia
- Original language: English

Original release
- Network: ABV-2
- Release: 1959

Come In on This is an Australian television series which aired during 1959 on Melbourne station ABV-2. Compered by Robert Peach, the series aired at 9:30PM on Mondays. It aired fortnightly and was broadcast live. Competition in the timeslot consisted of U.S. western series Trackdown on HSV-7 and the locally produced live variety series In Melbourne Tonight on GTV-9.

== Format ==
Robert Peach would ask members of the studio audience for their opinions on various subjects. The audience would be members of a particular organisation or group.

== See also ==
- Leave It to the Girls – Panel discussion series
- The Critics – Panel discussion series
- Any Questions – Panel discussion series
