= Sunday Costs Five Pesos =

- Genre: comedy
- Based on: play by Josefina Niggli
- Directed by: Paul O'Loughlin
- Country of origin: Australia
- Original language: English

Production
- Running time: 30 mins
- Production company: ABC

Original release
- Network: ABC
- Release: 15 May 1957 (Sydney)
- Release: 21 June 1957 (Melbourne)

Sunday Costs Five Pesos is a 1957 Australian television film based on the one-act stage play of the same name by Josefina Niggli. Aired live in Melbourne, it was a comedy set in Mexico.

A kinescope recording was made of the broadcast and shown in Sydney at a later date. These were the only two cities in Australia with television at the time. Duration of the television play was approximately 30 minutes, and aired on ABC.

It was one of the first comedies produced for Australian television, which had begun less than a year earlier.

== Plot ==
A Mexican woman deals with an unfaithful lover.

== Cast ==
- Guy Le Claire
- Melpo Zaracosta (a Greek actor who had moved to Australia)
- Brenda Senders
- Audrey Teasdale
- Joan Landor

== See also ==
- List of live television plays broadcast on Australian Broadcasting Corporation (1950s)
