= Any Questions (Australian TV series) =

1958 Australian TV series (1958–1963)

- Genre: Panel discussion
- Presented by: Frank Eyre (Melbourne); Nicholas Larkins (Sydney); Frank Legg (Sydney)
- Country of origin: Australia
- Original language: English

Original release
- Network: ABC Television
- Release: 1958 – 1963

Any Questions is an Australian television series which aired on the ABC from 1958 to 1963. The series presented a panel, who would discuss various topics in each episode. ABC produced several discussion series during the 1950s and 1960s. Originally aired on Thursdays, it later moved to Wednesdays. Some of the editions were made in Sydney, while others were made in Melbourne.

== Overview ==
The program may have had its origins in a 1950s half-hour ABC radio program of the same name that was broadcast on Tuesday nights. The "Chairman" overseeing the panel varied: In Melbourne it included Frank Eyre, in Sydney it included Nicholas Larkins and Frank Legg.

TV listings from the run of the series suggest the Sydney edition was telerecorded for Melbourne broadcast, although video-tape had become available in Australia by 1959 ABC did not acquire video-tape equipment until the 1960s, likely due to the expense of early video-tape. It is not known if any of these telerecordings (also known as kinescope recordings) are still extant, given the erratic survival rate of 1950s Australian television programs.

== See also ==
- Leave it to the Girls – 1957 panel discussion series on ATN-7/GTV-9
- The Critics – 1959–1960 panel discussion on ABC
- Come In on This – 1959 Audience discussion on ABV-2
