= Maiva Drummond =

Australian actress

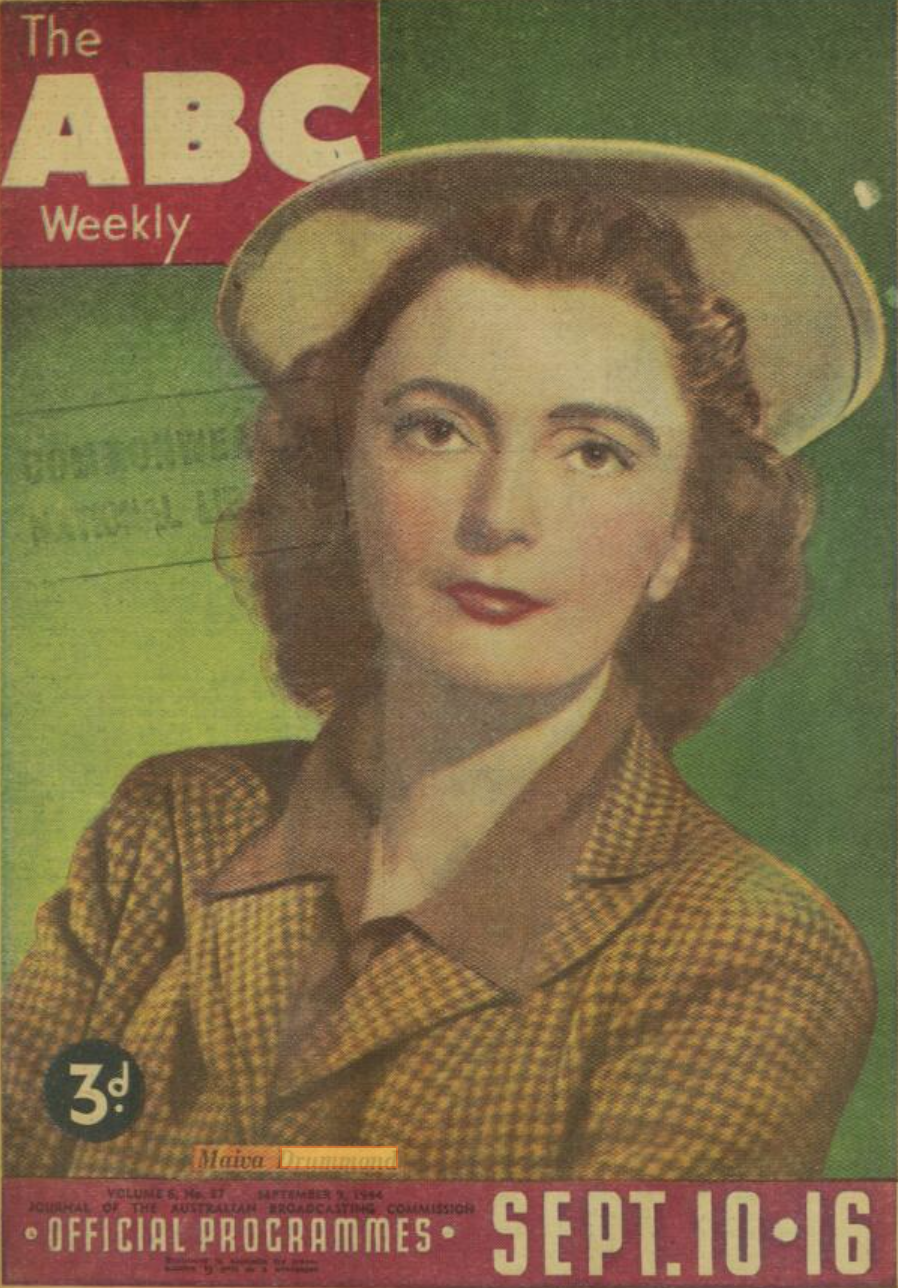
- Maiva Drummond in 1944
- Born: Edith Dorothy Maiva Drummond; 1908; Bathurst, New South Wales, Australia
- Died: 1977 (aged 68–69); North Sydney, New South Wales, Australia
- Occupation: Actress
- Years active: 1927-1976
- Known for: The Lawsons as Jean Lawson, Blue Hills as Rose Bishop
- Spouse: Paul O'Loughlin

Edith Dorothy Maiva Drummond (1908-1977) was an Australian actress of stage and radio, best known for her roles in the ABC radio serials The Lawsons as Jean Lawson in the late 1940s and in Blue Hills as Rose Bishop, from 1949 until 1976.

== Biography ==
Drummond was born in Bathurst, New South Wales in 1908 and lived most of her young life in Hay.

== Theatre and radio ==
Drummond started her career in amateur theatre with productions of A Midsummer Night's Dream and The Boatswain's Mate in Sydney in 1927. the following year she was teaching elocution back in Hay and held a concert featuring her pupils as a fundraiser for the Parish Hall, where she later produced and performed in many fundraising entertainments. In 1934 she appeared in Heat Wave with the Little Theatre in Melbourne. The following year she played Florrie in Gregan McMahon's production of Sheppey. Also in the cast was her future husband, Paul O'Loughlin.

Her radio career began in Melbourne, appearing in radio plays on 3LO. She moved to Sydney in 1937 to take the role of Elsie in the serial As Ye Sow broadcast nationally, meanwhile appearing on stage from time to time, including J. C. Williamson's production of Personal Appearance in which she played a comedy role alongside Peter Finch.

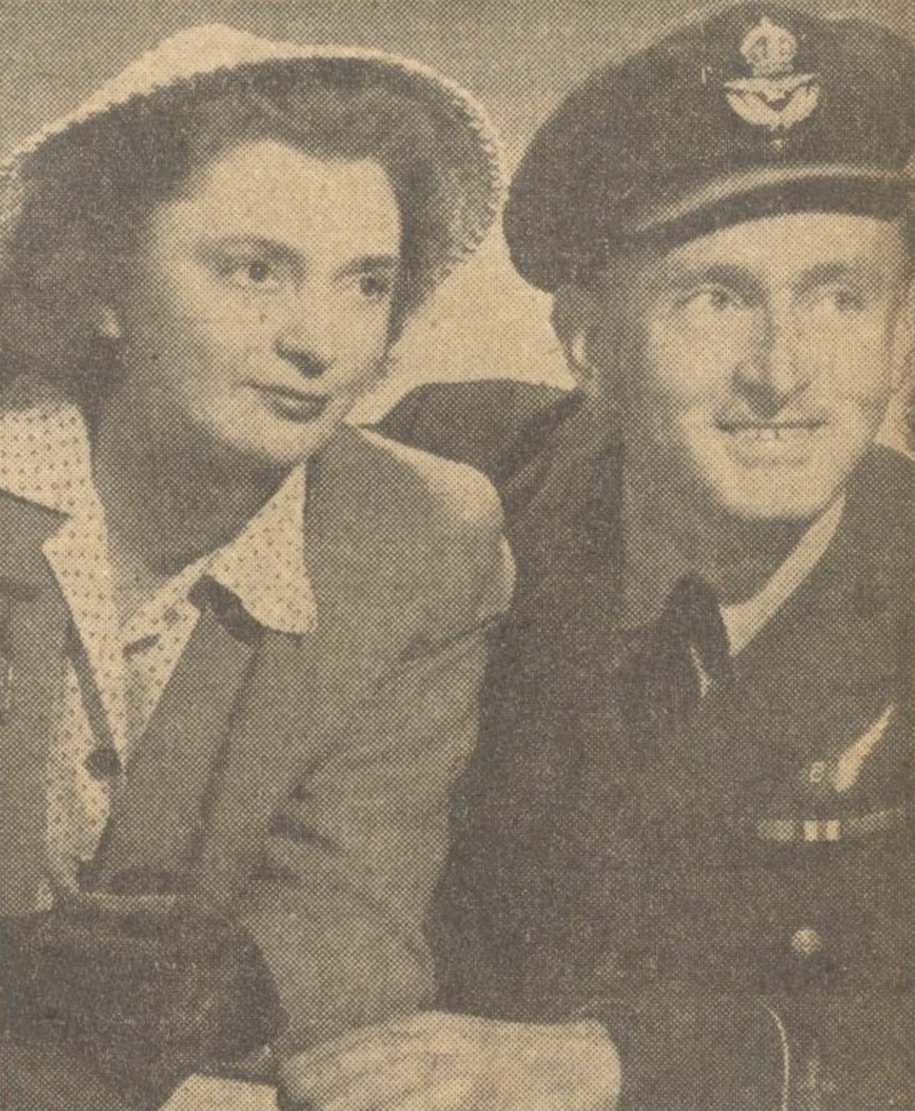
Maiva Drummond and Paul O'Loughlin in 1947

In the 1940s she played Jean Lawson in serial The Lawsons. To accommodate her pregnancy and early motherhood, writer Gwen Meredith wrote a train smash into the script.

She appeared in serial Blue Hills, as Rose Bishop from 1949 until 1976, where she and co-star Queenie Ashton as Granny Bishop had the last lines of dialogue in the last episode recorded 30 September 1976:

Rose: It's saying goodbye, Granny. I always feel it's sad to say goodbye.
Granny: Yes Rose, it certainly is this time . . . but we don't have to see people every day of the week to remember them in their surroundings. It isn't really so hard to say goodbye . . . to say goodbye . . . and God bless.

== Personal life and death ==
She married Paul O'Loughlin, an RAAF bombardier and ABC radio producer, in Sydney in 1942.

Drummond died in North Sydney, News South Wales in 1077, aged 68–69, her death was a year after the series Blue Hills ended. Her husband died a few months later aged 67.
