= Ric Hutton =

Australian actor

- Hutton in the 1960s
- Born: 1926
- Died: 1996 (aged 69–70)
- Occupation: Actor
- Years active: 1949–1992
- Known for: The Lost Islands (1976); The Castlereagh Line (1982); Professor Poopsnagle's Steam Zeppelin (1986)

Ric Hutton (1926–1996) was an Australian actor, who worked in Britain, Australia and the United States.

== Career ==
Hutton played the title role of Richard II in 1960 Australian TV play The Life and Death of King Richard II, which was one of the most elaborate productions made for Australian television at that time. That same year, he played John Putland in historical miniseries Stormy Petrel, adapted from the 1948 radio serial of the same name. He then took on the lead role of 'The Traveller' in 1961 TV play Traveller Without Luggage.

Hutton played Albert in 1963 TV play The Young Victoria, before going on to appear in British drama feature Guns at Batasi the following year, playing the character Russell.

In 1975, Hutton had a recurring part in the series Ben Hall. He landed the regular role of Prime Minister Rufus Qua in children's series The Lost Islands the following year. He then co-starred in sketch series The Garry McDonald Show, before playing the recurring role of Randolph King in soap opera The Restless Years in 1978.

In 1982, Hutton had roles in Australian thriller film The Dark Room and TV movie Runaway Island and its subsequent series from 1983 to 1984. He then played the ongoing role of Count Sator in children's series Professor Poopsnagle's Steam Zeppelin in 1986. The following year he undertook the recurring guest role of hotel inspector Bernard Elliott in long-running soap opera Neighbours and appeared as George Vendt in TV movie The Edge of Power.

Hutton was also a radio personality, who, early in his career, presented Shakespearean programmes on Sydney's 2CH. He became best known in Australia as the voice of 'Black Jack Seager' in the radio series The Castlereagh Line, written by Ross Napier, for the duration of its run. Hutton was the antitheses of Jack and found it difficult to play the role at times.

== Filmography ==
=== Film ===
| Year | Title | Role | Notes | Ref |
|---|---|---|---|---|
| 1964 | A Hard Day’s Night | Minor role (uncredited) | Feature film | |
| 1964 | Guns at Batasi | Russell | Feature film | |
| 1965 | The Ipcress File | Records Officer | Feature film | |
| 1982 | The Dark Room | Sam Bitel | Feature film | |
| 1989 | Luigi's Ladies | Lord Timothy | Feature film | |

=== Television ===
| Year | Title | Role | Notes | Ref |
|---|---|---|---|---|
| 1957 | Shadow of Doubt | Frank | TV play | |
| 1958 | Citizen of Westminster | | TV play | |
| 1958 | His Excellency | | TV play | |
| 1959 | The Strong Are Lonely | Don Pedro de Miura | TV play | |
| 1959 | Blue Murder | Ricky Lane-Forest | TV play | |
| 1960 | The General Motors Hour | Michael Scott-Finley | Episode: "The Grey Nurse Said Nothing" | |
| 1960 | The Life and Death of King Richard II | Richard II | TV play | |
| 1960 | Stormy Petrel | John Putland | Miniseries, 9 episodes | |
| 1961 | Whiplash | Phil Lachlan | 1 episode | |
| 1961 | The Big Client | Fred's Boss | TV play | |
| 1961 | Traveller Without Luggage | The Traveller | TV play | |
| 1961 | In Writing | John Clostin | TV play | |
| | Madame Butterfly | Pinkerton | TV play | |
| 1962 | Family Album | Richard Featherways | TV play | |
| 1962 | The Case of Private Hamp | Captain Hargreaves | TV play | |
| 1963 | Prelude to Harvest | Watkin Tench | TV play | |
| 1963 | Time Out | William Pitt | 1 episode | |
| 1963 | The Young Victoria | Albert | TV play | |
| 1963 | The Avengers | Mark St John | 1 episode | |
| 1964 | Crane | Vanel | 1 episode | |
| 1964 | The Protectors | Wheeler | 1 episode | |
| 1964 | No Hiding Place | Jazz Robins | 1 episode | |
| 1964; 1966 | Redcap | M.O. / Captain Blackburne | 2 episodes | |
| 1965 | Thursday Theatre | 1st Examiner / Porter | Episode: "Johnson over Jordan" | |
| 1965 | Armchair Mystery Theatre | Sergeant Court | Episode: "Time and Mr Madingley" | |
| 1965 | Jury Room | William Howlett, Juror | 1 episode | |
| 1965 | The Power Game | James Hopeton | 1 episode | |
| 1966 | The Troubleshooters | Harry Bennett | 1 episode | |
| 1966 | The Rat Patrol | Dr Muller | 1 episode | |
| 1967 | Adam Adamant Lives! | Maydew | 1 episode | |
| 1967 | I’m Alright Now | Maximus Superbus | | |
| 1968 | Contrabandits | Harrison / Dr Yarnold | 2 episodes | |
| 1969 | The Greater Illustrated History of the Glorious Antipodes Show | | Miniseries | |
| 1969 | Tilley Landed On Our Shore | Godwin | TV play | |
| 1970 | Dynasty | Wren | 1 episode | |
| 1970 | The Undertakers | | | |
| 1970 | Noel Ferrier's Australia A to Z | | | |
| 1971 | Barrier Reef | Hyles | 1 episode | |
| 1972 | Behind the Legend | | 1 episode | |
| 1972 | The Cousin from Fiji | Hillary Shadlett | Miniseries | |
| 1973 | Boney | Norman Lacey / Rockwell | 2 episodes | |
| 1973 | Elephant Boy | Colonel Shannon | 3 episodes | |
| 1973; 1974 | Division 4 | Alex Green / Ralph Hunter / Ronald Millar | 3 episodes | |
| 1974 | Matlock Police | Harry Edwards | 1 episode | |
| 1974 | Certain Women | | 1 episode | |
| 1975 | Ben Hall | Cowper | 3 episodes | |
| 1976 | The Lost Islands | Prime Minister Rufus Quad | 26 episodes | |
| 1977 | The Garry McDonald Show | Various roles | 8 episodes | |
| 1978 | Glenview High | Mr Parry | 1 episode | |
| 1978 | Chopper Squad | Dr Regan | 1 episode | |
| 1978 | The Restless Years | Randolph King | 7 episodes | |
| 1978 | The Scalp Merchant | | TV movie | |
| 1980 | Kingswood Country | Arthur King | 1 episode | |
| 1980 | The Timeless Land | Lord Sydney | Miniseries, 1 episode | |
| 1980–1982 | Cop Shop | Harry Walker / Dr Murray Atkinson / Douglas Kenyan | 6 episodes | |
| 1981 | The Cliffhanger | Airforce Major | TV movie | |
| 1982 | Runaway Island | Captain Corkle | TV movie | |
| 1983–1984 | Runaway Island | Captain Corkle | Miniseries, 8 episodes | |
| 1983; 1990–1991 | A Country Practice | Dr. Thornleigh / Bill Hannan | 5 episodes | |
| 1984 | Five Mile Creek | Mr Paterson | 1 episode | |
| 1984 | The Explorers | Governor Darling | 2 episodes | |
| 1985 | A Thousand Skies | Chairman | Miniseries, 2 episodes | |
| 1986 | Professor Poopsnagle's Steam Zeppelin | Count Sator | 24 episodes | |
| 1986 | The Hunchback of Notre Dame | Voice | Animated TV movie | |
| 1987 | Neighbours | Bernard Elliott | 3 episodes | |
| 1987 | The Edge of Power | George Vendt | TV movie | |
| 1988; 1989 | Rafferty's Rules | Mr. Graves | 2 episodes | |
| 1989; 1992 | E Street | Mr Hughes / Judge | 7 episodes | |
| 1992 | Mother and Son | Mr Powell | 1 episode | |

== Theatre ==
| Year | Title | Role | Notes | Ref |
|---|---|---|---|---|
| 1961 | Subway in the Sky | | Playhouse, Perth with National Theatre | |
| 1961 | The Merchant of Venice | | Palace Theatre, Sydney | |
| 1962 | Saint Joan | Peter Cauchon, Bishop of Beauvais | University of Adelaide, Tivoli Theatre, Melbourne | |
| 1968 | The Runaway Steamboat | J. Cressington Crawly | Australia Hall, Adelaide | |
| 1968–1969 | The Boy Friend | Percival Browne | Canberra Theatre, Phillip Theatre, Sydney, Comedy Theatre, Melbourne | |
| 1970 | A Song at Twilight | | Independent Theatre, Sydney | |
| 1970 | Come into the Garden Maud | | Independent Theatre, Sydney | |
| 1970 | Shadows of the Evening | | Independent Theatre, Sydney | |
| 1971 | 1776 | President – John Hancock | Her Majesty's Theatre, Melbourne, Theatre Royal Sydney | |
| 1973 | Lloyd George Knew My Father | Hubert Boothroyd | Her Majesty's Theatre, Melbourne | |
| 1973 | Blithe Spirit | | Killara Community Theatre, Sydney | |
| 1974 | Cowardly Custard | | Playhouse, Canberra, Marian St Theatre, Sydney | |
| 1974 | Don't Listen Ladies | French antique dealer | Marian St Theatre, Sydney | |
| 1975 | The Play is the Thing | Sandor Turai | Independent Theatre, Sydney | |
| 1976 | The Brass Hat | Major George Bradley | UNSW Old Tote Parade Theatre, Sydney | |
| 1976 | The Recruiting Officer | Justice Balance | Nimrod Theatre, Sydney | |
| 1976 | Getting On | | Marian St Theatre, Sydney | |
| 1976 | Rookery Nook | Putz | UNSW Old Tote Parade Theatre, Sydney | |
| 1977 | Something’s Afoot | Colonel Gilweather | Marian St Theatre, Sydney | |
| 1977 | The Three Sisters | Vershinin | Sydney Opera House | |
| 1977 | The Time Is Not Yet Ripe | Sir Joseph Quiverton | Sydney Opera House with Old Tote Theatre Co | |
| 1978 | In Praise of Love | Sebastian Cruttwell | Twelfth Night Theatre, Brisbane | |
| 1978–1980 | Annie | FDR | Her Majesty's Theatre, Melbourne, Her Majesty's Theatre, Sydney, Festival Theatre, Adelaide with J. C. Williamson | |
| 1980 | Shut Your Eyes and Think of England | Sir Justin Holbrook | Her Majesty's Theatre, Brisbane, Comedy Theatre, Melbourne with J. C. Williamson | |
| 1980 | Kiss Me, Kate | 1st Gunman | Marian St Theatre, Sydney | |
| 1981 | A Bedfull of Foreigners | Heinz | Marian St Theatre, Sydney | |
| 1982 | Amadeus | Count Orsini-Rosenberg | Theatre Royal Sydney with STC | |
| 1982 | Cowardy Custard | | Phillip St Theatre, Sydney | |
| 1982–1984 | The Cobra | Ninth Marquois of Queensberry | STC Rehearsal Room, Melbourne Athenaeum, Sydney Opera House with STC & MTC | |
| 1985 | The Heretic | | Sydney Opera House | |
| 1986 | Francis | | St Mary's Cathedral, Sydney | |
| 1986 | The Philadelphia Story | | Sydney Opera House with STC | |
| 1987 | Tom & Viv | | Wharf Theatre, Sydney with STC | |

== Radio ==
| Year | Title | Role | Notes | Ref |
|---|---|---|---|---|
| 1949 | The Merchant of Venice | Shylock | Radio play | |
| 1954 | The Fat Man | | Radio series | |
| 1958 | A Case of Split Personality | | Radio play | |
| 1959 | The Eleventh Hour | Narrator | Episode 4: "Case of the Curious Confession" | |
| 1960s | Sound of Thunder | Padraig Devoe | Radio series | |
| 1962 | The Idiot Weekly | | Radio series, season 3 | |
| 1969 | Kinkhead | Kinkhead | Radio series | |
| 1970s | Clayton Place | Jason Clay | Radio series | |
| 1979 | What Price Glory | Brigadier General Cokely | Radio play | |
| 1982 | The Castlereagh Line | Black Jack Seager | Radio series | |
| | Harvest of Hate | | | |
