= James II =

James II may refer to:

- James II of Avesnes (died c. 1205), knight of the Fourth Crusade
- James II of Majorca (died 1311), Lord of Montpellier
- James II of Aragon (1267–1327), King of Sicily
- James II, Count of La Marche (1370–1438), King Consort of Naples
- James II, Count of Urgell (1380–1433)
- James II of Scotland (1430–1460), King of Scots (1437–1460)
- James II of Cyprus (circa 1438–1473), Titular King of Jerusalem
- James II of England (1633–1701), also James VII of Scotland

== Other uses ==
- James II (record), a 1985 EP by James
- "James II" (Adventure Time), a television episode

== See also ==
- James I (disambiguation)
- James III (disambiguation)
- James IV (1473–1513), King of Scotland
- James V (1512–1542), King of Scotland
