= Time Out (Australian TV series) =

- Genre: Talk show
- Presented by: Alastair Duncan
- Country of origin: Australia
- Original language: English
- No. of episodes: 26

Original release
- Network: ATN-7
- Release: 9 March 1963

Related
- Tribunal

Time Out is an Australian television series which aired in 1963 on ATN-7. It had a spin-off, titled Tribunal.

== Cast ==
- Alastair Duncan as Interviewer
- Bridget Lenihan
- Edward Hepple as Thomas Peel
- James Condon
- John Armstrong as John Priesly
- John Gray as Samuel Marsden
- John Unicomb as Matthew Flinders
- Joe McCormick as J. C. Williamson
- Lyndall Barbour as Mary Bryant / Lola Montez
- Lynne Murphy
- Margo Lee
- Max Meldrum as Thomas Wainewright
- Max Osbiston as Robert O'Hara Burke
- Neva Carr Glyn
- Nigel Lovell as Louis de Rougemont
- Ric Hutton as William Pitt
- Richard Davis as Sir Frederick Pottinger
- Richard Meikle as James Matra
- Robert McDarra as Bernhardt Holtermann
- Ron Haddrick
- Rosemary Webster as Daisy Bates
- Stewart Ginn as Isaac Nichols
- Tom Farley as Jem Davis

== Synopsis ==
The series consisted of TV and stage actors portraying Australian historical figures, who were 'interviewed' by a faux-interviewer, played by actor Alastair Duncan.

== Production ==
26 ten-minute episodes were produced.

== Broadcast ==
The series began airing in March 1963 on Sydney station ATN-7 after the evening news (which aired in a 20-minute time-slot). It is unclear when the series ended.

== Episodes ==
No.	Title	Ref
1	"William Pitt"	
2	"Mary Bryant"	
Convict who travelled to Australia with the First Fleet and managed to escape the colony with her husband and nine other convicts – sailing over 2,500 miles to Timor in an open boat.
3	"James Matra"	
Travelled to Australia with Captain Cook on the Endeavour, and wanted to turn Australia into an agricultural centre, but it was rejected in favour of a penal colony.
5	"Matthew Flinders"	
English-born explorer in Australia, who together with George Bass, was the first to circumnavigate Van Diemen's Land, followed by the Australian continent.
6	"Louisa Lawson"	
Australian social reformer, journalist, publisher, and mother of Henry Lawson.
8	"Isaac Nichols"	
English convict who became the chief overseer of convicts, and later, the first postmaster of Sydney.
10	"Daisy Bates"	
Irish-Australian journalist, welfare worker and anthropologist who conducted fieldwork among indigenous groups in western and southern Australia.
11	"Thomas Peel"	
Land speculator who brought migrants to Western Australia in exchange for a land settlement.
12	"Mary Reibey"	
British-Australian business woman involved in real estate and shipping.
13	"Jem Davis"	
The only white man to live with indigenous Australians since the 1840s.
15	"John Priesly"	
Bushranger said to be the model for Captain Starlight in the novel Robbery Under Arms.
16	"Louis de Rougemont"	
Would-be explorer who wrote a book about his 'adventures' and was later exposed as a fraud.
17	"Samuel Marsden"	
Magistrate who helped convicts and brought their wives to Australia. Also a founder of the Australian wool industry and a missionary instrumental in New Zealand's colonisation.
19	"Bernard Holtermann"	
German-Australian goldminer, who in 1872 discovered the largest specimen of reef gold then known in the world.
20	"Sir George Arthur"	
Scottish-born administrator who was the lieutenant governor of Tasmania from 1823 to 1837.
21	Thomas Wainewright	
English writer and artist, transported to Australia in 1837 for forgery of the signatures of his trustees – also suspected of being a serial killer.
22	"Sir Frederick Pottinger"	
Australian Inspector of Police, who was responsible for the arrest of bushranger Ben Hall.
23	"Lady Forbes"	
24	"J. C. Williamson"	
U.S.-Australian actor and theatre entrepreneur.
26	"Robert O'Hara Burke"	
Australian explorer of Burke and Wills fame. He was the leader of the ill-fated expedition from Melbourne to the Gulf of Carpentaria – the first expedition to cross Australia from south to north.
	"Lola Montez"	
Spanish dancer who arrived in Melbourne at the height of the Gold rush and was endeared by the diggers, but considered a scarlet woman by the upper class.
	"Adam Lindsay Gordon"	
British-Australian poet, horseman, police officer and politician. He was the first Australian poet to gain considerable recognition overseas.
	"Charlotte Badger"	
Former convict who was on board the Venus during a mutiny in Tasmania. Fiction abounded that she had a role in the mutiny, leading her to become known – erroneously – as Australia's first female pirate.
