= Gwen Plumb =

Australian actress (1912–2002)

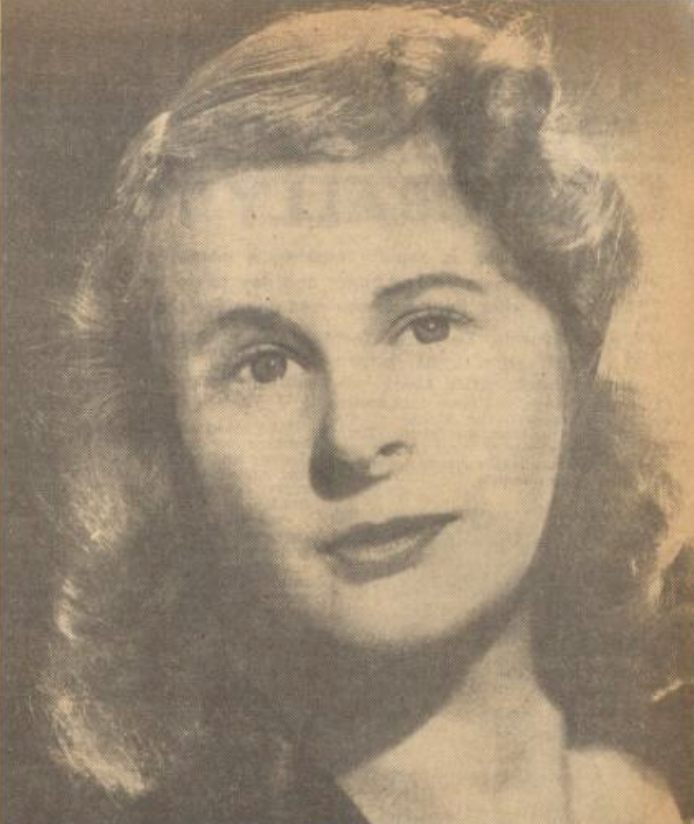
- Plumb in 1947
- Born: Gwendoline Jean Plumb; 2 August 1912; Stanmore, New South Wales Australia
- Died: 5 June 2002 (aged 89); Kirribilli, New South Wales Australia
- Occupations: Radio performer; radio producer; radio scriptwriter; stage/revue actress; vaudevillian; television actress
- Years active: 1930–1995
- Known for: The Young Doctors (TV series) as Ada Simmonds; Richmond Hill (TV series) as Mum Foote; Home and Away (TV series) pilot episode as Doris Peters; The Harp in the South (miniseries); Poor Man's Orange (miniseries)
- Partner: Thelma Scott

Gwendoline Jean Plumb AM BEM (2 August 1912 – 5 June 2002), was an Australian performer of international appeal, actress and comedian active in literally every form of the art genre, (except circus) including revue, pantomime, vaudeville, interviewing, game shows, live appearances, compering, radio production, scriptwriting and acting, television soap opera and mini-series and made-for-TV film.

She was considered the "Grand Dame of Australian entertainment", with a career spanning 65 years, in her later years she was best known to local and international audiences in serial The Young Doctors as gossip Ada Simmonds, the ill-fated Richmond Hill as May "Mum" Foote and the pilot of Home and Away as Doris Peters.

She released an autobiography in 1994 called Plumb Crazy.

== Early years ==
Plumb was born in 1912, to Charles Thomas Plumb and Ann Eliza (nee Thomas) and had worked in various jobs in her early career including as a typist, shop server and briefly in a chocolate factory, but having a flair for writing, starting to produce radio copy work for an advertising agency, after which she became interested in acting.

== Career ==
=== Radio and theatre ===
Plumb started her acting career in 1930, with the Gwen Meredith Chelsea drama club. She had her first well-known role as Emmie Lawson on The Lawsons and later in the longest-running Australian radio serial Blue Hills, She was very active in the radio industry early in her career and would work in this sector as a producer, scriptwriter and performer and hosted a long-running radio program on Australia's Macquarie Radio Network from 1945 to 1974.

Plumb also had a radio show in Sydney opposite Gordon Chater. She was well known for conducting celebrity interviews, for her own radio show including travelling to Europe to conduct recordings.

Plumb had a long career in the theatre, starting from 1930 and was a cast member of the debut season of the Old Tote Theatre Company, and once quipped that she "played in just about every form of public entertainment except the circus".

=== Television ===
Plumb appeared in some early Australian drama such as Adventure Unlimited.

She is probably best remembered for the Australian soap opera The Young Doctors as Ada Simmonds for its entire November 1976 – March 1983 run. She released a cook book, What's Cooking with Ada, under her character’s name in 1980. Other notable roles were in the mini-series The Harp in the South and Poor Man's Orange in the mid-1980s. She acted in Neighbours as Mrs. Forbes in 1985, appearing in scenes opposite Alan Dale, with whom she had starred in The Young Doctors.

She later played the key role of in the serial Richmond Hill as Mum Foote in 1988. Having agreed to act in the planned new series, Plumb was offered, and played in the pilot of another proposed series Home and Away as Doris Peters. When Home and Away also went into production, Plumb opted to honour her earlier agreement to do Richmond Hill. The role of Mum Foote had been specially written with her in mind by show creator, Reg Watson. Richmond Hill had a run of just 12 months, and Plumb stayed with the series for all of that time. In 1995, Plumb returned to Home and Away for a number of episodes, playing a different character.

Plumb also appeared in the mini-series Stark, based on Ben Elton's novel of the same name.

== Personal life ==
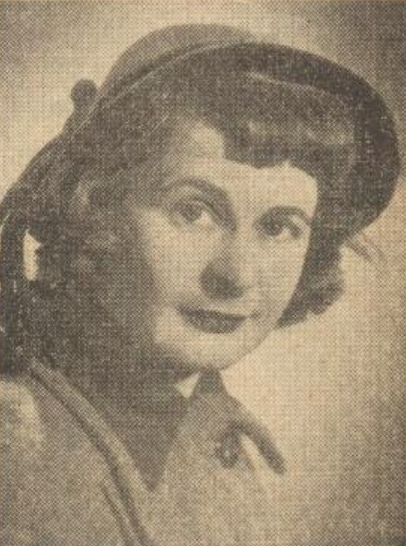
Gwen Plumb in 1952

Plumb's lifelong partner was Australian radio, stage and screen actress Thelma Scott, best known for playing pompous socialite Clair Houghton in the TV series Number 96.

Plumb's autobiography, Plumb Crazy was published by Pan Macmillan in 1994.

In 1990, Plumb had a large growth removed from her colon and lower bowel. She began rehearsing for a production of Arsenic and Old Lace two months later, which left her exhausted. She felt that she had never fully recovered from the surgery. In April 1996, she fell and broke her pelvis. In September 2000, Plumb fell while she was getting ready for bed and broke her hip. Upon hearing the news, producer and television mogul Reg Grundy filled her hospital room with flowers.

Plumb died on 5 June 2002, aged 89, at her home in Kirribilli.

== British and Australian honours ==
Plumb was awarded a British Empire Medal in 1973, and was made a Member of the Order of Australia in 1993. Both awards recognised her community and charity work.

== Selected radio ==
| Year | Title | Role |
|---|---|---|
| c.1940s | Blue Hills | Emmie |
| 1945–1974 | Macquarie Radio Network | Hostess as herself |
| unknown years | 2GB Radio Show with Gordon Chater | Hostess/interviewer |

== Filmography ==
=== Film ===
| Year | Title | Role | Type |
|---|---|---|---|
| 1960 | The Sundowners | Uncredited | Feature film |
| 1982 | Ginger Meggs | Miss Leach | Feature film |

=== Television ===
| Year | Title | Role | Type |
|---|---|---|---|
| 1958–1963 | Women's World | Host | TV series |
| 1959 | A Tongue of Silver | Role unknown | Teleplay |
| 1960 | Venus Observed | Role unknown | Teleplay |
| 1961 | Corinth House | Mrs. Heysham | Teleplay |
| 1962 | Consider Your Verdict | Guest role | TV series, 1 episode |
| 1962 | Jonah | Guest role: Lady Jane Franklin | TV series, 1 episode |
| 1965 | Write Me a Murder | Elizabeth Wooley | TV film |
| 1965 | Adventure Unlimited | Guest role | TV series, 1 episode "Crocodile" |
| 1965 | The Mavis Bramston Show | Various Characters | TV series |
| 1965 | TV Spells Magic | Guest (with Max Meldrum, Ron Shand, Ruth Cracknell, Evie Hayes, Wendy Blacklock, David Copping, Kevin Miles, Chips Rafferty & Keith Petersen) | TV Special |
| 1966 | Wall to Wall | Role unknown | Teleplay |
| 1966 | Australian Playhouse | Guest roles: Mrs. Cooper / Elsie Hopewell | TV series, 2 episodes "The Prowler" |
| 1966; 1967 | Nice 'n Juicy | Guest role: Mrs. Withers | TV series, 2 episodes |
| 1969 | The Don Lane Tonight Show | Guest | TV series, 1 episode |
| 1969 | Gwennie and Noel | Host | TV series |
| 1970 | The Rovers | Guest role: Gaylene Higgins | TV series, 1 episode |
| 1973 | Boney | Guest role: Miss Packer | TV series, 1 episode |
| 1974 | Mac and Merle | Lead role: Merle McInerney | TV pilot |
| 1975 | Celebrity Squares | Herself | TV series, 1 episode |
| 1976 | This Is Your Life | Herself | TV series, 1 episode |
| 1976–1982 | The Young Doctors | Regular role: Ada Simmons | TV series, 1394 episodes |
| 1977 | Bobby Dazzler | Guest role: Dinner Guest 1 | TV series, 1 episode |
| 1978; 1980; 1981; 1982: 1983; 1984 | The Mike Walsh Show | Guest | TV series, 6 episodes |
| 1980 | Telethon '80 | Herself | TV special |
| 1981; 1982 | The Mike Walsh Show | Guest | TV series, 1 episode |
| 1981 | Parkinson in Australia | Guest | TV series, 1 episode |
| 1981 | Go Health | Herself with Young Doctors cast: Judy McBurney, Karen Pini, Peter Lochran | TV series, 1 episode |
| 1982 | The Daryl Somers Show | Guest | TV series, 1 episode |
| 1985 | Neighbours | Recurring Guest role: Mrs. Forbes | TV series, 10 episodes |
| 1985 | The Man in the Iron Mask | Peronne (voice) | Animated TV film |
| 1986 | A Halo for Athuan | Lead role: Mother Paul | TV film |
| 1987 | The Harp in the South | Recurring role: Grandma Kilker | TV miniseries, 3 episodes |
| 1987 | Poor Man's Orange | Recurring role: Grandma Kilker | TV miniseries, 2 episodes |
| 1987 | I've Come About the Suicide | Supporting role: Miss Clemesha | TV film |
| 1987 | The Flying Doctors | Guest role: Nellie Keene | TV series, 1 episode |
| 1988 | Richmond Hill | Regular role: Mum Foote | TV series, 38 episodes |
| 1988; | Home and Away | Guest role: Doris Peters | TV series, 1 episode |
| 1989 | The Bert Newton Show | Guest with Barry Crocker & Ronnie Burns | TV series, 1 episode |
| 1991 | The Seven-Thirty Report | Guest - Herself with June Bronhill (Arsenic and Old Lace) | ABC TV series, 1 episode |
| 1992 | In Sydney Today | Guest | TV series, 1 episode |
| 1992 | A Country Practice | Guest role: Morna Peacock | TV series, 1 episode |
| 1993 | The Late Show | Guest | TV series, 1 episode |
| 1993 | Stark | Recurring role: Mrs. Tyron | TV miniseries, 3 episodes |
| 1994 | Under The Skin | Role unknown | TV film series, 1 episode "The Family Spirit" |
| 1994 | At Home | Guest | TV series, 1 episode |
| 1994 | Today | Guest | TV series, 1 episode |
| 1994 | TVTV | Guest - Herself with The Young Doctors cast: Chris King, Tim Page, Diana McLean, Louise Howitt & Darren Gray | TV series, 1 episode |
| 1995 | Home and Away | Recurring Guest role: Elizabeth Clarke | TV series, 4 episodes |
| 1997 | Where Are They Now? | Guest - Herself with The Young Doctors cast: Chris King, Judy McBurney, Mark Holden & Tim Page | TV series, 1 episode |
| 1999 | Funny By George: The George Wallace Story | Herself | TV special |
