= Tribunal (TV series) =

Australian television series

- Genre: Talk show
- Created by: Lyle Martin
- Written by: Lyle Martin
- Presented by: Alastair Duncan
- Country of origin: Australia
- Original language: English

Production
- Running time: 10-15 minutes

Original release
- Network: ATN-7
- Release: 1963 – 1964

Tribunal is an Australian television series which aired from 1963 to early 1964. It was a spin-off of the series Time Out.

== Synopsis ==
Actors played controversial historical figures such as Brutus, General Custer, Lizzie Borden and Richard III, who were interrogated about their actions by Alastair Duncan.

== Cast ==
- Alastair Duncan as Interviewer
- Alexander Archdale as Benedict Arnold
- Allan Trevor as General George Custer
- Brian Thomas as Judge Jeffreys
- Denys Burrows as Charles Dawson
- Don Pascoe as Richard III
- Gordon Glenwright as William Kidd
- James Condon as James Connolly
- John Ewart as General Santa Anna
- Keith Buckley as Andrew Volstead
- Kerry Francis as John Wilkes Booth
- Leonard Teale as Preston Tucker
- Margo Lee as Lady Emma Hamilton
- Max Meldrum as Guy Fawkes
- Nancy Stewart as Queen Elizabeth I
- Nigel Lovell as Bartolemeo Vanzetti
- Owen Weingott as Dick Turpin
- Richard Davies as Vidkun Quisling
- Ron Haddrick as Marcus Brutus / John Brown
- Ruth Cracknell as Lizzie Borden
- Stewart Ginn as Han van Meegeren
- Terry McDermott as Walther Schwieger
- Walter Sullivan as Admiral John Byng

== Broadcast ==
The series aired from 1963 to early 1964 on Sydney station ATN-7, in time slots ranging from 10 to 15 minutes in duration.

Despite airing in an era where Australian television series were often wiped, many of the episodes are held by the National Film and Sound Archive.

== Episodes ==
No.	Title	Description	Ref.
2	"Marcus Brutus"	Roman politician who lead a band of conspirators to assassinate Julius Caesar, at the height of his power.	
3	"Walther Schwieger"	Lieutenant and commander of the U-boat which sunk the liner Lusitania, losing nearly 2,000 people.	
4	"Guy Fawkes"	Catholic conspirator involved in the 1605 Gunpowder Plot, an unsuccessful attempt to assassinate King James I and destroy the Houses of Parliament.	
5	"Vidkun Quisling"	Norwegian politician who was executed for treason and collaboration with the Nazis.	
6	"Mr Lozier"	American businessman associated with the Manhattan Island Hoax, one of history’s most extraordinary practical jokes.	
7	"Admiral John Byng"	British Navy admiral who was executed, after he failed to defend British possession of Minorca against France during the Seven Years' War.	
8	"General George Custer"	General of the 7th US Cavalry involved in the Battle of the Little Bighorn, Custer's Last Stand and the peace treaty that the government and Sioux Indians signed, but white Americans didn't honour.	
9	"Richard III"	King also known as Richard Crookback, disliked by all and accused of the murder of his nephews, the little Princes in the Tower of London.	
10	"Benedict Arnold"	Mlitary officer who fought in the Continental Army during the American Revolutionary War before defecting to the British side in an act of treason.	
12	"William Kidd"	Respected sea captain, who was subsequently convicted and hanged, after being found guilty of piracy.	
13	"Earl of Cardigan"	British Army officer Involved in the charge of the light brigade of Balaclava during the Crimean War.	
14	"Isabella Beeton"	English journalist and author associated with 19th century Victorian domestic management and cookery.	
15	"Robespierre"	Known as The Incorruptible during the French Revolution.	
16	"Elizabeth I"	Queen of England who finally signed the death warrant for her cousin Mary, Queen of Scots.	
18	"John Brown"	Anti-slaver and abolitionist who raided the United States arsenal for arms in Virginia in 1869, in the hope that American negroes would revolt against their Southern masters.	
19	"James Connolly"	Irish revolutionary involved in the 1916 Easter Rising, who was killed in the fighting, despite the fact that England had already agreed to grant Ireland home rule.	
20	"Leander Starr Jameson"	Prime minister of the Cape Colony who led an army of 600 men into the Transvaal Republic, risking the chance of a full scale war.	
22	"Aimee Semple McPherson"	Evangelical preacher in California during the 1920s and 1930s, who attracted attention over how she obtained the money to finance the establishment of her church.	
24	"Niccolò Machiavelli"	Author of book called "The Prince", in which he detailed a theory of political behaviour devoid of scruples and devoted to the idea that the end justifies any means.	
25	"Emmeline Pankhurst"	Political activist who campaigned for women’s voting rights, and eventually became the leading figure in the Suffragette movement.	
26	"Judge Jeffreys"	Judge involved in the Bloody Assizes trials, following the Monmouth Rebellion against James II.	
27	"Serafino Pellizzioni"	Italian man who was convicted and sentenced to death for the 1864 murder of Michael Harrington in London, but was subsequently found innocent and received a royal pardon.	
28	"Thérèse Humbert"	French impostor and fraudster who became notorious for an elaborate inheritance scam.	
29	"John Wilkes Booth"	American stage actor who became infamous for assassinating President Abraham Lincoln.	
30	"General Santa Anna"	Mexican military leader and president involved in the Texas Revolution and the Mexican-American War.	
31	"Dick Turpin"	Eighteenth-century English highwayman whose reputation became embellished through popular legend.	
32	"Lawrence of Arabia"	British archaeologist, military officer, writer and diplomat associated with the Arab Revolt against the Ottoman Empire during World War I.	
33	"Preston Tucker"	American automobile entrepreneur who attempted to revolutionise the American motor industry in the years following the World War II.	
34	"Charles Dawson"	English amateur archaeologist involved in the Piltdown Man hoax, one of the most significant scientific frauds in the history of palaeoanthropology.	
36	"W. G. Grace"	Influential English cricketer who helped popularise modern cricket.	
37	"Andrew Volstead"	American Republican politician instrumental in establishing the legal framework for national Prohibition.	
38	"Bartolemeo Vanzetti"	Italian-born political activist arrested over the murders of two employees of a shoe factory in Massachusetts, leading to one of America’s most controversial criminal trials and his execution.	
39	"William Bonney"	American frontier outlaw associated with the Lincoln County War, also known as Billy the Kid.	
	"Han van Meegeren"	Dutch painter involved in art dealings with Nazi leader Hermann Göring during the German occupation of Holland.	
	"Lizzie Borden"	American woman accused and acquitted of murdering her father and his second wife.	
	"Louis Riel"	Political leader and revolutionary who, seeking to defend his people’s rights and land, led the Métis rebellions, and was subsequently found guilty of treason and hanged.	
	"Campbell of Glenorchie"	Deemed responsible for the infamous Massacre of Glencoe in the Scottish Highlands in 1692, in which members of the MacDonald clan were killed by soldiers who had been billeted with them.	
	"Lady Emma Hamilton"	English socialite, performer and artist’s model, best remembered for her relationship with British naval commander Admiral Horatio Nelson and her marriage to Sir William Hamilton, the British ambassador to Naples.	
