= Lola Brooks (actress) =

Australian actor (1933–1985)

- Born: Lola Edna Brooks c. 1923; New Zealand
- Died: 1985 (aged 61-62)
- Occupation: Actress
- Years active: 1941-1984
- Spouse: Richard Meikle (m 1955–?)

Lola Edna Brooks (c. 1923– 1985) was a New Zealand–Australian primarily character actress, who worked across both countries with extensive credits in radio, theatre and television (serials and TV movies and plays), over a career spanning nearly 45 years.

She appeared in several television plays, but was likely most notable for her early career in radio, starting in 1941 as one of "The Golden Age of Australian Radio" stars in the radio serial's The Lawsons and Blue Hills during a 5-year stint as Fanny/Judy MacArthur, she also appeared in several radio plays,

She was once married to actor Richard Meikle.

Primarily a character actress, however she provided her voice for the children's film adaptation of Ethel Pedley's, Dot and the Kangaroo directed by Yoram Gross, however didn't appear in any of the franchise sequels

She appeared in several theatre roles most especially in musicals including on stage touring in the Sandy Wilson musical The Boy Friend. and also a stage version of 'The Sound of Music

She had a notable guest appearance in sitcom Mother and Son as Heather the meals on wheels lady, starring Ruth Cracknell.

Brooks died in Sydney, New South Wales in 1985, aged around 61-62.

== Select filmography ==
=== Film ===
- Tomorrow's Child (1957, TV play)
- The Importance of Being Earnest (1957, TV play) as Cecily
- His Excellency (1958, TV movie)
- Bodgie (1959, TV play)
- On the Beach (1959) as Lieutenant Hosgood, Bridie's secretary
- The Sundowners (1960)
- The Right Thing (1963, TV play) as Elena
- A Private Island (1964, TV play) as Jean
- Twelfth Night (1966, TV play) as Maria
- Dot and the Kangaroo (1977) as voice

=== Television ===
- Emergency-Ward 10 (1960)
- Fury in Petticoats (1962) as Anne Dill
- The Young Victoria (1963) as Queen Victoria
- Behind the Legend (1974) as Mary Reibey
- Cop Shop (1981) Nan Greer
- Sons and Daughters (1982) as Nora Todd
- A Country Practice (4 episodes guest role)
- Mother and Son (1984) as Heather

== Theatre ==
- The Boy Friend
- A Worm's Eye View
- Top of the Bill
- The Sound of Music

== Radio ==
- Blue Hills as Mandy Gordon
