= Great Inheritance (radio play) =

1945 Australian radio play

- Genre: drama feature
- Running time: 30 mins (9:45 pm – 10:15 pm)
- Country of origin: Australia
- Language: English
- Syndicates: Australian Broadcasting Commission
- Written by: Gwen Meredith
- Original release: 16 January 1945

Great Inheritance is a 1945 Australian radio play by Gwen Meredith about soil erosion. It was one of her best known radio works outside of Blue Hills.

The play won first prize for best documentary in a 1944 ABC Writing Competition.

It was published in a 1946 collection of radio plays.

A critic from the Melbourne Advocate said "Miss Meredith has turned out a piece of radio writing that is certainly one of the best things on the air this critic has ever heard... one thing emerged clear from "Great Inheritance" and that was her sure grasp of dramatic values."
