= James I =

James I may refer to:

== People ==
- James I of Aragon (1208–1276)
- James I of Sicily or James II of Aragon (1267–1327)
- James I, Count of La Marche (1319–1362), Count of Ponthieu
- James I, Count of Urgell (1321–1347)
- James I of Cyprus (1334–1398), also titular king of Armenia and Jerusalem
- James I of Scotland (1394–1437)
- James VI and I (1566–1625), King of Scotland (r. 1567–1625), and also King of England and Ireland (r. 1603–1625)
- James Harden-Hickey (1854–1898), self-declared Prince James I of Trinidad

== Other uses ==
- James 1, the first chapter of the Epistle of James
- James I Land, Spitsbergen, Svalbard

== See also ==
- James (disambiguation)
- James II (disambiguation)
- James III (disambiguation)
- James IV
- James V
