= Paul O'Loughlin =

Australian actor and director

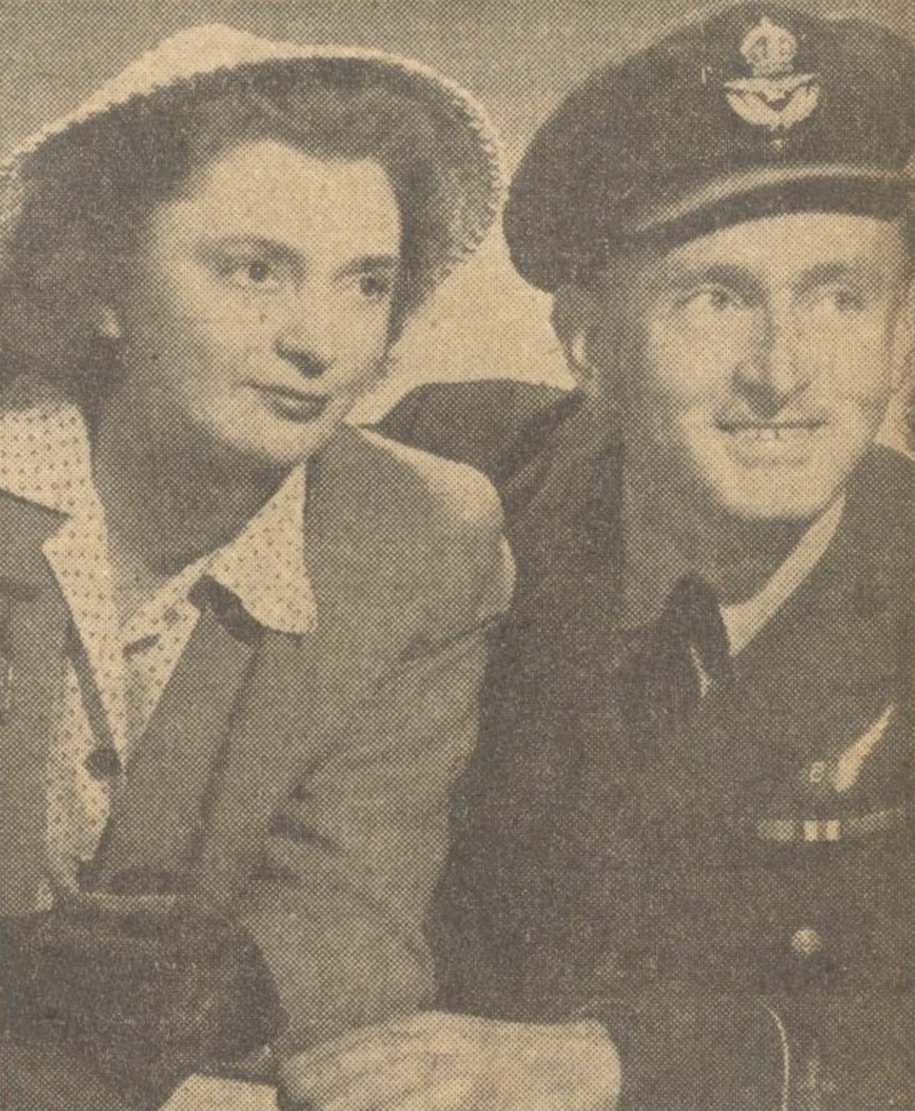
- Paul O'Loughlin in 1947 with wife Maiva Drummond
- Born: 4 July 1919; Albert Park, Victoria, Australia
- Died: 7 October 1977 (aged 58); Artarmon, New South Wales
- Occupations: Actor, director, producer
- Spouse: Maiva Drummond
- Military career
- Branch: Royal Australian Air Force
- Service years: c1939-1945
- Rank: Bombardier
- Conflicts: World War II

Paul Carmel O'Loughlin (4 July 1910 – 7 October 1977) was an Australian actor, director and producer. He directed some of the first television plays in Australia after having joined the Australian Broadcasting Commission (ABC) in the 1930s. He directed numerous stage plays.

O'Loughlin was born in Albert Park, Victoria on 4 July 1910 and worked in Brisbane and Adelaide.

He served in the RAAF in WWII and married actress Maiva Drummond in 1942. The couple had met in Melbourne in 1935 in the cast of Gregan McMahon's production of W. Somerset Maugham's Sheppey.

He directed the first Australian television drama play The Twelve Pound Look.

== Credits (selected) ==
- The Twelve Pound Look (1956)
- The Passionate Pianist (1957)
- Three Cornered Moon (1957)
- Sunday Costs Five Pesos (1957)
- A Phoenix Too Frequent (1957)
- The Importance of Being Earnest (1957)
- Miss Mabel (1958)
- Act of Violence (1959)
