= The Edge of Power =

- Directed by: Henri Safran
- Written by: Richard Cassidy
- Produced by: Jan Tyrrell; James M. Vernon
- Starring: Ivar Kants; Henri Szeps
- Cinematography: Peter Levy
- Edited by: Richard Hindley
- Release date: 1987
- Running time: 93 minutes
- Country: Australia
- Language: English

The Edge of Power is a 1987 Australian made-for-television film directed by Henri Safran.

== Cast ==
- Ivar Kants as Peter Mueller
- Sheree da Costa as Cassandra Mueller
- Henri Szeps as Steve Traynor
- Anna Maria Monticelli as Gail Traynor
- Warwick Moss as Russell Lane
- Ric Hutton as George Vendt
- Vic Rooney as Emile Ludke
- John Orcsik as Alex Cahill
- Peter Corbett as Derek Mortimer
- John Stone as Ivar Staines
- Katherine Thomson as Judy Staines
- Kjell Nilsson as Jorma

== Synopsis ==
In a future where democracy is coming to an end, a journalist publishes a fabricated story alleging that a prominent right-wing politician is a Nazi sympathiser. The journalist subsequently investigates the assassination of the leader of an opposing political party.

== Production ==
The film was also known by the alternative titles The Red Crescent and Tomorrow’s News: The Edge of Power.
