= The Young Victoria (1963 film) =

- Ad in The Age 27 Mar 1963
- Based on: the play Victoria Regina by Laurence Housman
- Directed by: Alan Burke
- Starring: Lola Brooks; Ric Hutton
- Country of origin: Australia
- Original language: English

Production
- Running time: 60 mins
- Production company: ABC

Original release
- Network: ABC
- Release: 27 March 1963 (Sydney, Melbourne)

The Young Victoria is an Australian television film of 1963 which aired on ABC on 27 March 1963. Based on the play Victoria Regina, it is a 60-minute drama about the courtship and marriage of Queen Victoria to Prince Albert. It stars Lola Brooks as Victoria and Ric Hutton as Albert.

The production was reduced to four vignettes. It was sponsored by the International ' Theatre Institute, the drama-wing of-UNESCO, to celebrate World Theatre day. It was shown on the same day in Sydney, Melbourne and Adelaide to celebrate the day.

== Premise ==
The courtship of Queen Victoria and Prince Albert.

== Cast ==
- Lola Brooks as Victoria
- Ric Hutton as Albert
- Anne Beecher
- Jasmine Greenfield as Lady Jane
- Benita Harvey
- Jessica Noad as a duchess
- Alastair Roberts
- Frank Taylor
- Judith Thompson
- Vaughan Tracey
- Rhod Walker as Ernest, Albert's brother

== Production ==
Douglas Smith did the sets.

== Reception ==
The Sydney Morning Herald gave the film a mixed review, calling it "mildly entertaining and agreeably presented" but also "these excerpts did not succeed in amounting to a play... it was all rather like a musical comedy without the music".

The Age gave it a mixed review.

The Bulletin gave the production "three cheers".

== See also ==
- List of live television plays broadcast on Australian Broadcasting Corporation (1950s)
