= A Halo for Athuan =

- Based on: radio play by Julie Ann Ford
- Written by: Alan Burke
- Directed by: Alan Burke
- Starring: Gwen Plumb; Ron Haddrick; Denise Roberts
- Country of origin: Australia
- Original language: English

Production
- Producer: Alan Burke
- Running time: 75 mins
- Production company: ABC

Original release
- Network: ABC
- Release: 1986

A Halo for Athuan is a 1986 Australian made-for-television comedy film about two nuns in a rural monastery. It was one of the series of nine Australian telemovies that screened on Friday nights in 1986.

== Cast ==
- Gwen Plumb as Mother Paul
- Ron Haddrick as The Abbott
- Denise Roberts as Maizy
- Fiona Stewart as Sister Gabriel
- Danny Carretti as Brother Jamie
- Barry Latchford as Brother Zack
- Saviour Sammut as Brother John
- Dane Carson as Tim Hollander
- Tom Farley as Mike
- Basil Clarke as Father Gregory
- Tim Elliott as Father Bernard
- Fred Steele as Cardinal 'Mbupa
- Arthur Faynes as Mayor
- Ken Snodgrass as Desk Sergeant

== Plot ==
Two nuns scale the walls of the Athuan monastery, after proving that the original charter of the place does not prevent the inclusion of women. Mother Paul quickly takes over the administration of the monastery's foundering cherry liqueur business. She has her sights set on becoming the next Abbott.

== Reception ==
Melbourne newspaper The Age called the film "a real charmer".
