= The Girl From Moonooloo =

- Written by: David Mitchell
- Directed by: Richard Wherrett
- Starring: Jacki Weaver; David Atkins
- Country of origin: Australia
- Original language: English

Production
- Producer: Jacqui Culliton
- Cinematography: Julian Penney
- Editor: Michael Honey
- Running time: 58 mins
- Production company: ABC

Original release
- Network: ABC
- Release: June 2, 1984

The Girl From Moonooloo is 1984 television musical film, directed by Richard Wherrett and starring Jacki Weaver. It features 12 songs from the 1930s and was presented as a tribute to 1940s MGM musicals.

== Plot ==
Dance school pianist Jacki Summers becomes the voice of Ginger Meggs on a radio serial while an orphaned boy Paul "Mr. Scullen" Carmichael is presented to the public as singer.

== Cast ==
- Jacki Weaver as Jacki
- David Atkins as Benny
- Henri Szeps as Bert
- Ivan Waters as Mr. Scullen
- Noeline Brown as Marge
- Margo Lee as Miss Miles
- Robyn Moase as Mabel
- Barbara Wyndon as Mrs. Meggs
- Frank Lloyd as Mr. Meggs
- Hayley Joye as Min
- John Ewart as Derelict
- John Paramor as Derelict
- Arthur Pickering as Derelict

== Reception ==
The Age's Brian Courtis says "Weaver, a consummate performer in this frothy TV musical, helped us accept the patent silliness of what we were seeing. There were many entertaining performances (Atkins, Henry Szeps, Noelene Brown and Margo Lee were excellent). Ros Coleman's choreography made use of the limitations of the small screen and, judging by the splendid art deco sets, designer Roger Kirk is ready for Busby Berkeley's return. But a big, rare thank-you to Auntie for finding in her program schedules the roomooloo..." Michael Shmith in the Age's Green Guide wrote "It is all wonderfully harmless stuff: the girl, the boy, the villain; the songs, the dances, the big production numbers. The Girl From Moonooloo is firmly tongue-in-cheek; one of those affectionate tributes to the 1930s which only minds of the 1980s are able to achieve."

The Sydney Morning Herald's Kerry Brown says "Made as a Hollywood-style musical, it suffers rather badly from an ABC-style budget. To compensate for its deficiencies, this less-than-extravaganza inundates us with Sydney landmarks." Richard Coleman in his TV Extra column in the Sydney Morning Herald wrote that "it turned out, Moonooloo was just an excuse to try out a few [Sydney Theatre Company] song-and-dance routines. Jacki Weaver, left without a character to portray, played the dumb blonde and smiled a lot."
