= The Fields of Heaven =

Play written by Dorothy Hewett

- Original language: English
- Written by: Dorothy Hewett
- Genre: Drama

Premiere
- Date: 10 February 1982
- Place: Perth, WA
- Directed by: Rodney Fisher

The Fields of Heaven is a play written by Dorothy Hewett in 1982. It shows the gradual destruction of a once-beautiful country property in the Great Southern district of Western Australia, Marvel Locke, due to overgrazing and rising salt. In Act 1 it is tree-covered with fields of wheat like "cloth of gold". In Act 2, only a few straggling trees remain. Evocative bush sounds give way to harsh crow calls.

The play spans the years 1929 to the 1950s, as the lead characters grow from youth to disillusioned middle age. Tom Barrow the owner begins a long campaign to redress the balance of nature, which loses out to the fierce ambition of the Italian immigrant worker Rome Bodera, who rises from poor farm hand to the richest farmer in the district. Rome is also exploitative in his relations with women - he "takes" Tom's schoolgirl daughter Louie behind the haystacks during his own wedding, and later has an affair with an Italian woman Lucia whom he whips off from the dance floor during Lucia's wedding. He also sleeps with his wife's sister, who lives with them. The play however also emphasises Rome's vulnerable side, his disorientation at having to live far from home in Italy.

Louie Barrow loves painting and travels as a "hanger-on" to a bohemian decadent world in Europe, but gives up painting when she discovers she is second-rate. At the end of the play, she and Rome are sworn enemies in a dispute over the property, but some hope for the future lies with their love child Gabe. Under an arrangement made by Louie's parents, he is brought up by the Bodera family, but he shares Louie's love of art.

The play was originally intended to be an epic novel. It is a parable of archetypes, very loosely based on characters from Hewett's childhood - her father Tom Hewett and the Italian neighbour who managed the property after the Hewetts moved to Perth. It follows themes from Hewett's long poem, "Legend of the Green Country".

The first staging was at the Playhouse Theatre from 10 February to 8 March 1982 as part of the Festival of Perth. It was directed by Rodney Fisher, and the cast included Ron Haddrick, Lex Marinos, and Hewett's university friend from the 1940's, actress Pat Skevington.

The production was repeated at the Festival of Sydney by the Sydney Theatre Company, and ran in the Opera House from 3 January 1983 to 19 February 1983, the longest run of any Hewett work. It was again directed by Fisher, and the stellar cast reprised Haddrick and Marinos, as well as Jennifer Claire, Arkie Whiteley, Sally McKenzie and Margo Lee.

== Review ==
Radic, Leonard (25 February 1982). "Dreamtime in the suburbs". The Age. p. 10.

Wagner, Lucy (31 December 1982). "Lex Marinos would much prefer the world of a politician". Sydney Morning Herald. p. 16.

Menzies, Colin (10 January 1983). "Superb production of Hewett play". Sydney Morning Herald. p. 54.

"Mainstream". Sydney Morning Herald. 18 February 1983. p. 28.
