= The Importance of Being Earnest (1957 film) =

1957 film

- Genre: comedy
- Based on: The Importance of Being Earnest; 1895 play by Oscar Wilde
- Directed by: Paul O'Loughlin
- Country of origin: Australia
- Original language: English

Production
- Producer: Paul O'Loughlin
- Running time: 90 minutes
- Production company: ABC

Original release
- Network: ABC
- Release: 18 December 1957 (Sydney live)
- Release: 24 January 1958 (Melbourne, taped)

The Importance of Being Earnest is a 1957 Australian TV performance of the play by Oscar Wilde. It was directed by Paul O'Loughlin. It was made at a time when Australian drama production was rare.

It aired on 18 December 1957 and starred Margo Lee and Richard Meikle. It was the longest running Australian-made drama to have aired on Australian TV until that time, beating the record set by Sound of Thunder (78 mins).

It was the first time Oscar Wilde had been performed on Australian television.

== Premise ==
A series of misunderstandings around the name "Earnest".

== Cast ==
- Lola Brooks as Cecily
- Neva Carr Glyn as Lady Bracknell
- James Condon as John
- Margo Lee as Gwendolyn
- Richard Meikle as Algernon
- Edward Howell as Rev. Canon Chasuble
- Audrey Teesdale as Miss Prism
- John Brunskill as Lane
- Charles McCallum as Merriman

== Production ==
O'Loughlin hired a studio at Artransa for show. He could only use it for two days meaning the production had to be carefully planned. The director said, "We've never done a 90-minute play before. We've done one hour plays, and the extra half hour only adds to our difficulties in one respect. In every half-hour there are 90 to 100 shots. The camera has four lenses. Each shot must be worked out in advance, and the lens' for it nominated. We have 300 instead of 200 shots to plan in minute detail."

Set designer Desmonde Downing said " "We are striving for a grand and spacious effect while retaining the atmosphere of the period." Costumer Thelma Afford said "Every detail of the women's gowns must be just right—the tiniest crease in a gown is picked up and exaggerated. As most of the shots will be close-ups and mid-close-ups, we try to create period and character in necklines and shoulderlines, and hat—we've had a lot of fun with the hats."

There were three scene changes.

== See also ==
- List of live television plays broadcast on Australian Broadcasting Corporation (1950s)
