= The Lawsons =

- Genre: Serial drama
- Running time: played twice daily
- Country of origin: Australia
- Language: English
- Syndicates: ABC
- Starring: Vivian Edwards, Ailsa Grahame, Jane Holland
- Created by: Gwen Meredith
- Written by: Gwen Meredith
- Original release: 21 February 1944 – 25 February 1949
- No. of episodes: 1,299

The Lawsons was an Australian radio serial broadcast by the ABC and created and written by Gwen Meredith that ran daily from 21 February 1944 to 25 February 1949. It was a forerunner to the better known Blue Hills also created and written by Gwen Meredith.

The show began as a propaganda series to introduce modern farming methods. Bush fires, one of natures great hazards of the countryside was give dramatic treatment on one series, of which an excerpt here >

As Meredith was from the city of Sydney north shore suburb of Castlecrag and knew little about the "country ways of life", so she gained research for the serial, by staying at a stock and station at the largely agricultural area near Gunnedah. The serial was hugely popular immediately and ran for five years. Meredith adapted the series into a play and a novel.

== Premise ==
The adventures of the Lawson family who live on a farm. Mr. and Mrs. Lawson, and there six children, daughters Sue and Jean and their four boys Wally, Chris, Ted and Brian. Described as the typical Australian country folk, they raise sheep and poultry and grow wheat and vegetables, but are not as burlesque as Dad and Dave or Doreen and Ginger Mick.

== Cast ==
| Character | Actor |
|---|---|
| Narrator | Alfred Bristowe |
| Mr. John Lawson | Vivian Edwards |
| Mrs. Ellen Lawson | Ailsa Grahame |
| Sue Lawson | Jane Holland |
| Jean Lawson | Maiva Drummond |
| Don McKenzie | Jerry Weils |
| Wally Lawson | |
| Chris Lawson | Hal Lashwood |
| Ted Lawson | Rupert Lawson |
| Brian Lawson | Warwick Ritchie |
| Ruth Lawson (Chris's wife) | Marie Rosenfeld / Margaret Christensen |
| Max Ralston | George Randall |
| Joe Walters | Reg Collins |
| Hilda Walters | Nellie Lamport |
| Emmie Lawson | Gwen Plumb |
| Aunty Kate | Winifred Green |
| Donald McKenzie | Jerold Wells |

== Stage play ==
Meredith wrote a stage play version of the radio serial. The theatre version was presented by J.C. Williamson's and produced by Vivian Edwards, who played the original John Lawson in the radio serial. The production toured New South Wales regional areas in 1950 with a cast including Ed Devereaux and Pamela Bygrave. The scenery was designed and executed by J.C. Willamson's son William Constable.

=== Cast of theatre Tour (1950) ===
- Pamela Bygrave as Sue
- George Simpson Lyttle as Mr Lawson
- Jean Blue as Mrs. Lawson
- Billee Lockwood as Hilda
- Dorothea Dunstan as Emmy
- Edward Devereaux as Ted Lawson
- Peter Morris as Brian
- Mary Bartholomew as Jean Lawson
- Pat Penny as Max Ralston
- Edmund Allison as Joe
- Ben Lewin as Archie.
