= Traveller Without Luggage =

- Based on: Le Voyageur sans bagage by Jean Anouilh
- Written by: George F. Kerr
- Directed by: Henri Safran
- Starring: Ric Hutton
- Country of origin: Australia
- Original language: English

Production
- Running time: 70 mins
- Production company: ABC

Original release
- Network: ABC
- Release: 16 August 1961 (Sydney)
- Release: 20 September 1961 (Melbourne)
- Release: 11 December 1962 (Brisbane)

Traveller Without Luggage is a 1961 Australian television film directed by Henri Safran and starring Ric Hutton. It was Safran's first English language work.

== Plot ==
A man (Ric Hutton) has been in an asylum for 16 years suffering from loss of memory. He is without the memories that the normal person carries with him as "luggage". On the advice of the asylum psychiatrist, he sets out to find his past and spends 24 hours with a family who believe he is their lost son. He discovers he was a seducer, a wife-stealer, and generally vile character, and decides to ditch his old self, adopt a new personality and a new family.

== Cast ==
- Ric Hutton as the Traveller
- Enid Lorimer as the Mother
- Rhod Walker as the brother George
- Patricia Kennedy as the maid
- Clarissa Kaye as the sister in law Valerie
- Gordon Glenwright as Butler
- Brian Gilbert as Small Boy
- Robert McDarra as psychiatrist

== Production ==
The play had been performed at the Sydney University Drama Society in June 1960.

== Reception ==
The critic from The Sydney Morning Herald wrote that the production was marked by "competence rather than exciting path-finding... Desmonde Downing's sets rank with the best one has seen in A.B.C. productions; and George Kerr's adaptation of the play, while it reduced many interesting subsidiary threads, nevertheless fairly happily retained the essence of the writing."
