= Blue Hills (radio serial) =

Former Australian radio serial

- Genre: soap opera/serial
- Running time: 15 minutes
- Country of origin: Australia
- Home station: ABC
- Starring: see: List of actors
- Created by: Gwen Meredith
- Produced by: Frank Harvey, Robert Montgomery, Eric John
- Original release: 28 February 1949 – 30 September 1976
- No. of episodes: 5,795
- Opening theme: Pastorale by Ronald Hanmer

Blue Hills was an Australian radio serial that was broadcast by the Australian Broadcasting Commission (ABC) for 27 years, from 28 February 1949 to 30 September 1976. It ran for a total of 5,795 episodes, and was at one time the world's longest-running radio serials. Each episode lasted 15 minutes.

Created and written by Gwen Meredith, the series focuses on families who reside in a typical Australian country town, called 'Tanimbla'. The series title itself related to the residence of Dr. Gordon, the local G.P.

Blue Hills succeeded another Gwen Meredith serial The Lawsons, with many of the same themes and characters, and which ran for 1,299 episodes.

== History: background ==
Blue Hills followed an earlier similar style series written by Gwen Meredith called The Lawsons, which was the brainchild of play editor Leslie Rees and Frank Clewlow of the Australian Broadcasting Corporation (then Commission), which had been approached by Government in 1943 to publicise the need for farmers to grow more soya beans as part of the war effort. They reasoned that a popular radio programme would be more effective than ordinary propaganda, and approached Gwen Meredith to write a radio drama. She was an unlikely choice as she lived in Melbourne and production was to be in Sydney, and she was a city girl with little knowledge of primary production. But she accepted the contract from the ABC's Rural Department and spent some weeks on a sheep station in Gunnedah to gather background. The show went to air on 21 February 1944 and slowly achieved a loyal country audience.

The story revolved around the farmer John Lawson (Vivian Edwards), his wife Ellen (Ailsa Grahame), and their 19-year-old daughter Sue (Jane Holland). The original remit was extended to enable modern farming methods and seasonal information to be passed on to farmers, as well as the usual fare of soap operas. As the war ended, Grahame and Holland left for England, and were replaced by Ethel Lang and Joan Lord. Under producer Charles Wheeler, who insisted of actors that they use a natural conversation style rather than stage voices, the show lasted five years before it was terminated, at Meredith's request, to make way for a similar program of greater scope.

The last episode of The Lawsons was aired on 25 February 1949, a Friday, and Blue Hills commenced the following Monday, 28 February 1949.

Blue Hills was broadcast from the ABC's capital city stations 2FC, 3AR, 4QG, 5CL, 7ZL and their regional networks at 1 pm AET and repeated, for city listeners, at 6:45 pm, Monday to Friday, though the Friday episode was dropped in 1954. Due to limitations imposed by the telecommunications of the time (and no doubt also the two-hour time difference), it was initially broadcast only in the Eastern States and South Australia. 5DR Darwin (later 8DR) began broadcasting the program in September 1952, and 6WF Perth and Western Australian regional stations began in January 1955, using transcription discs and, later, magnetic tape sourced from Sydney. The duration of each episode was 15 minutes apart from the finale, which needed 30 minutes to round up each character. The first words spoken in the first episode were by Queenie Ashton as Mrs Gordon, and as Granny Bishop the last words ("good bye") in the final episode some 27 years later. The finale episode is available at the National Film and Sound Archive.

When the serial's end was announced, a Canberra Times editorial expressed appreciation of it.

== List of actors ==
Among the many Sydney actors – perhaps hundreds – who played in Blue Hills, several actors had previously appeared in Gwen Meredith's earlier radio serial The Lawsons.

Name	Role	Notes/Ref
Alexander Archdale	Richard Darbyshire	
Queenie Ashton	Lee Gordon (married to Dr Gordon) (1949) / Granny Emily Bishop (mother of Ed and Meg) (1949-1976)	
Julianna Allen		
Philippa Baker	a Scottish nurse	
John Barnes		
Ray Barrett		
Joan Bruce		
Faye Anderson		
Lola Brooks	Fanny/Judy Macarthur	
Barbara Brunton	Sally Howard (?-1952)	
Keith Buckley	Nick Macarthur (son of Jim)	
Alma Butterfield	Mrs. Jenkins (1950)	
Neva Carr Glynn		
Amber-Mae Cecil	Jackie Macarthur / Emmie Lawson) (married Ted in 1951)	replaced Myrna Dodd, replaced Sheila Sewell
Rupert Chance	Ted Lawson (married Emmie in 1951)	
Peg Christensen	Emmie Lawson	
Marie Clarke	Mary Howard (love affair with Peter Macarthur)	
Reg Collins	Joe Walters the original Joe Walters/Ned Walters (Joe's brother)	
Ruth Cracknell	Ruth Lawson	
Patti Crocker	Mandy Gordon (younger daughter of Dr Gordon, married Dr Frobisher)/Meg Macarthur/ Anne (Meg's daughter)	(Note: Crocker returned much later to play minor parts, and was a member of the final cast, as was Osbiston)
Marshall Crosby	Josh Roberts	
Therese Desmond	Amelia	
Ed Devereaux		
Myrna Dodd	Jackie Macarthur	
Maiva Drummond	Jean Lawson (The Lawsons) / Rose Bishop (Blue Hills 1964-1976) (married to Ed)	
John Ewart	appeared in final episode)	
Tom Farley	Jim Macarthur (married to Meg)	
Winifred Green	Martha Walters	
Gordon Grimsdale	Dr Neil Gordon Dec. 1949	
Anne Haddy	Elizabeth Ross-Ingham	
Marcia Hathaway	Hospital nurse	
Madelaine Howell		
Faye Kelton		
Nellie Lamport	Hilda (the Lawsons' cook, aunt of Emmie) married Joe Walters late in life	
Ethel Lang (Note: Also known as Ethel Brunton Gibb, Lang played Mrs Lawson in The Lawsons)	Dr Gordon's charlady (1949)/Meg Macarthur (married to Jim Macarthur)	
Hal Lashwood	Chris Lawson (in The Lawsons)	
Camilla Lay	Maisie Jenkins (-1949)	
Nigel Lovell	a Polish airman	
Paul Maclay		
Charles McCallum	Ed Bishop (son of Granny, married to Rose)	
John McCallum		
Robert McDarra		
John Meillon		
Lynne Murphy		
Coralie Neville	(Note: Coralie Neville was married to Gordon Grimsdale)/Trixie Gordon (daughter of Dr Gordon) 1949	
Ida Newton	Auntie Gertie (1949)	
John Norman	Jerry Walters	
John Nugent-Hayward	Dr Neil Gordon (March 1949) (Note: According to Patti Crocker's memoirs, Grimsdale took over the part when Nugent-Howard died — definitely after 1955 and possibly 22 January 1958)	
Max Osbiston	Dr Frobisher (married Mandy Gordon) (1976)	
Pat Pearson	Judy Macarthur	
Gwen Plumb	Emmie Lawson (niece of Hilda; married Ted in 1951)	
Ron Roberts		
Madge Ryan		
June Salter	Sally Howard (1952–)	Replaced Barbara Brunton
Thelma Scott	Aunt Laura	
Hilda Scurr		
Sheila Sewell	Emmie Lawson (married Ted Lawson in 1951) (appeared to 1953)	
Georgie Sterling	Claire Throsby (love affair with Anderson Roberts)	
Nancye Stewart	Mabel Ross	
Rod Taylor	Anderson Roberts (love affair with Sally Howard)	
Ngaire Thompson	Jenny Roberts	
Morris Unicomb	Bruce Gordon (son of Dr Gordon)	
Lou Vernon	Col. Ross-Ingham	
Charles ‘Bud’ Tingwell		
Peter Whitford	Jack Porter	

Producers included:

- Frank Harvey
- Robert Montgomery
- Eric John, to whom Gwen Meredith credited much of the show's success.

== Signature tune ==
The famous opening signature tune was taken from a short orchestral piece called Pastorale by the British composer Ronald Hanmer. Until Hanmer moved to Australia in 1975, he had no idea that his work had been used by the ABC and had become so famous in Australia (although few Australians could have identified its composer). He later re-worked this short piece into a longer orchestral work titled Blue Hills Rhapsody, which he recorded with the Queensland Symphony Orchestra. The recording first used was played by the New Century Orchestra.

== Books ==
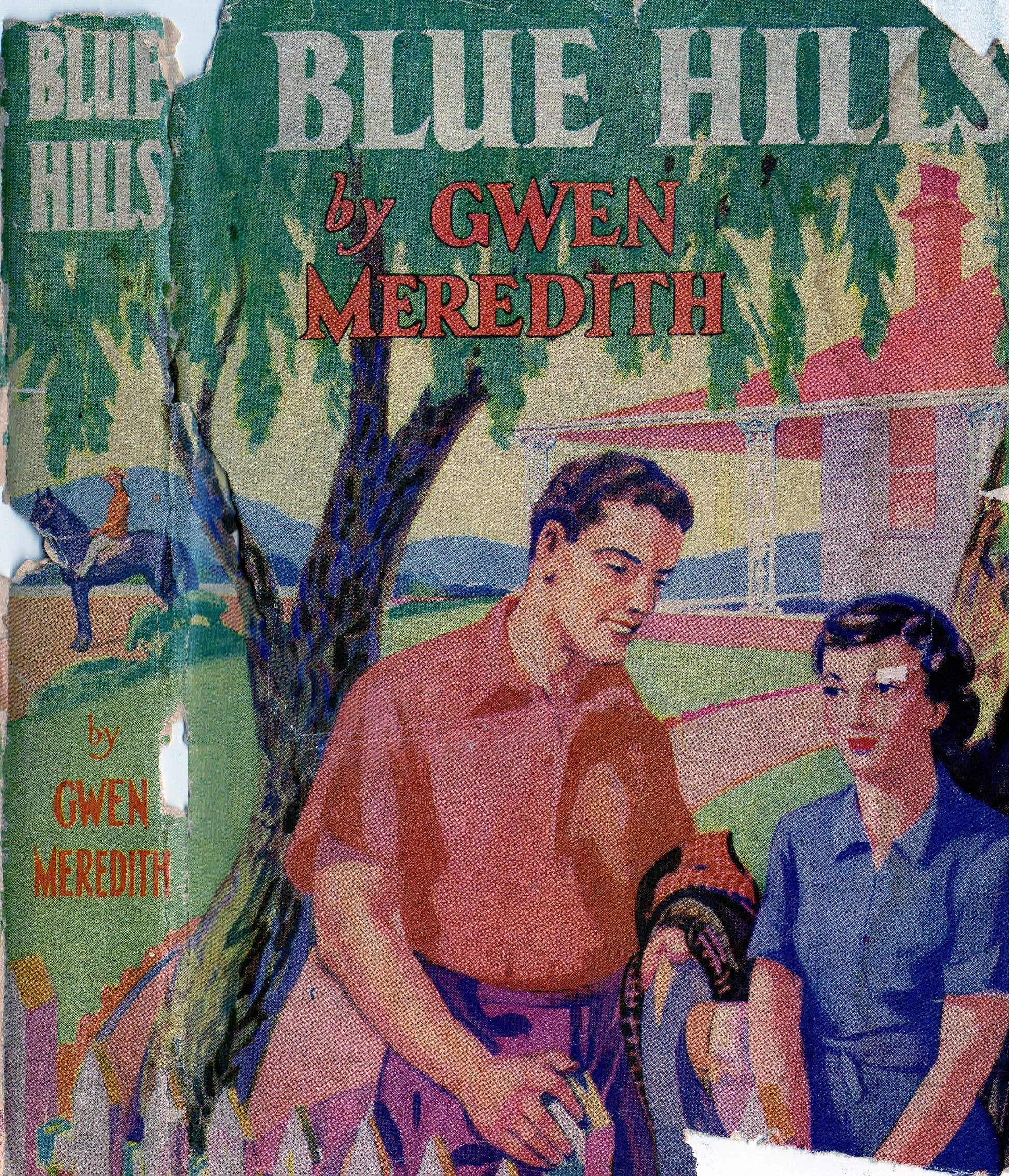
Book cover, First edition 1950

Several books based on the show were written by Gwen Meredith:

- The Lawsons (1948)
- Blue Hills, Angus and Robertson (1950)
- Beyond Blue Hills (1953)
- Into the Sun (1961)

In preparing the radio serial Blue Hills for publication I have not been set such a formidable task as faced me with The Lawsons, since up to the present date Blue Hills has been presented by the Australian Broadcasting Commission for little more than a year. This means a mere half million words to contend with! But since the publisher sets a defensive maximum of eighty thousand words, intending readers should be warned—and perhaps heartened by the warning—that in that editing, a great deal has perforce been discarded. However, I think the main elements and characters have survived the massacre and the book brings the story to the point reached on air at the time of writing. GWEN MEREDITH. (Author's note, Blue Hills (1950))

== See also ==
- The Archers – the present 'world's longest running radio soap opera' (it has broadcast over 19,200 episodes up to 2019).
