= Margo Lee =

Australian actress and singer

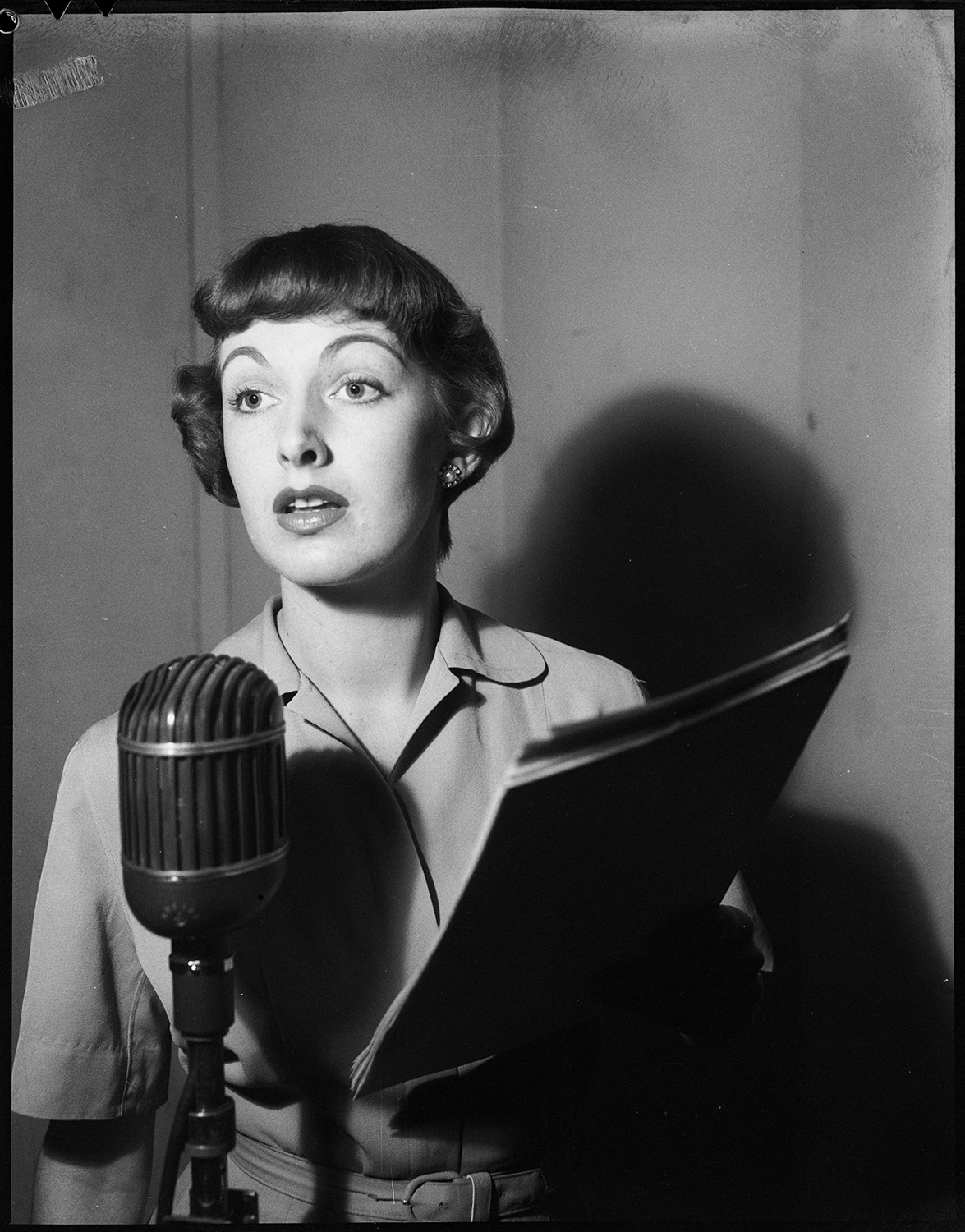
- Portrait of Margo Lee, television story, 1951, by Eric Francis
- Born: Margaret Stella Lee; 20 June 1923; Leichhardt, Sydney, New South Wales, Australia
- Died: 16 October 1987 (aged 64); Gosford, New South Wales, Australia
- Education: New South Wales State Conservatorium of Music
- Occupations: Actress, singer
- Years active: 1941–1987
- Spouse: Joseph Francis (Frank) Sidney Brooks (m. 1945)
- Children: 2

Margaret Stella Lee (20 June 1923 – 16 October 1987) credited as Margo Lee, was an Australian actor and singer of radio, stage, film and TV.

== Early life ==
Lee was born on 20 June 1923 in the Sydney suburb of Leichhardt, to Margaret Clara (née Draper, formerly Watts) and John Llewellin Hogg. Her father was a dentist in Strathfield, followed by Gloucester.

Lee went to school at the local convent, where she received piano lessons from one of the nuns. From the age of 12, she boarded with an aunt at Strathfield and in 1937 attended high school at the New South Wales State Conservatorium of Music. She studied under Frank Hutchens, keen on becoming a concert pianist, and won the under-18 piano championship at the City of Sydney Eisteddfod in 1939.

== Career ==
Lee abandoned her career as a pianist, to workman actress in radio with George Edwards before joining 'The Youth Show' on the Macquarie Network in 1941, alongside Joy Nichols and Michael Pate, in which she was known as the 'Golden Girl'. Adopting the stage name 'Margo Lee', she sang and played comedy roles with Colin Croft. During World War II, she acted in radio serials, including anthology series Lux Radio Theatre.

Lee began performing in theatre, appearing at Sydney's Minerva Theatre from 1943. She also had a role in the 1949 racecourse film Into the Straight.

From 1952, Lee was a panellist for eight years on Leave It to the Girls, beginning on Sydney radio station 2GB before moving to the television version. She also appeared on stage in a 1954 production of Top of the Bill at Sydney's Phillip Street Theatre, in their very first revue.

Lee played leading roles in ABC radio plays including Major Barbara (1953), The Merchant of Venice (1954), Kind Hearts and Coronets (1959) and The Importance of Being Earnest (1964), as well as Noël Coward comedies.

Her performance alongside American actor Vincent Price in 1984, earned her the 1955 Lux Radio Theatre Award for Best Actress of the Year. The win was accompanied by a trip to Hollywood, to star in a TV play with Lux Video Theatre. While there for a period of four weeks, she was offered television parts and two film offers, but turned them down, not wanting to be away from her husband and sons for a great deal of time.

On her return to Australia, Lee appeared in Australia's first live television drama, the ABC play J. M. Barrie's The Twelve-Pound Look in 1956. She then starred in Stormy Petrel (1960), playing Elizabeth Macarthur. Roles followed in Boney and the Devil's Steps (1972) and Ride on Stranger (1979).

Lee continued working for stage, with a tap dancing role in a 1971 Melbourne production of musical comedy Charlie Girl, alongside a young John Farnham. She also performed as Gertrude opposite John Bell in a 1973 production of Hamlet at Sydney's Nimrod Theatre and played the Queen of Hearts in an Alice in Wonderland pantomime in 1976.

In 1978, Lee appeared in the films The Journalist and Tim, the latter alongside Mel Gibson in an early role. She also featured in Now and Then. Her television credits from the era included short-lived soap opera Catwalk and Crawford Productions police procedural series Division 4, as well as Cop Shop, Patrol Boat and Mismatch. From 1982 to 1985, Lee portrayed Caroline Smithers in long-running television series A Country Practice.

Lee had a role in a 1980 stage production of The Old Country, and in 1982, performed in a STC production of You Can't Take It With You at the Sydney Opera House, playing the Russian Grand Duchess. She playing lead in the Phillip Street revue Sister Mary Ignatius Explains It All for You, the following year.

In 1985, Lee won a Green Room Award for her supporting role in a stage production of Stepping Out.

Lee appeared posthumously as Miss Dawson in 1988 miniseries Melba.

== Awards ==
Year	Work	Award	Category	Result	Ref.
1955	1984	Lux Radio Theatre Awards	Best Actress of the Year	Won	
1985	Stepping Out	Green Room Awards	Best Supporting Female (Music Theatre)	Won	

== Personal life and death ==
On 1 November 1945, Lee married Joseph Francis (Frank) Sidney Brooks (d.1984), an advertising agent, at the Vaucluse Congregational Church. Together the couple had two sons, Derek and Richard. In 1956, the family moved into a house that they had built at Seaforth. In 1978, her sons still lived at home.

Lee died of breast cancer on 16 October 1987 in St Leonards, Sydney. She was survived by her sons.

== Filmography ==
=== Film ===
Year	Title	Role	Type	Ref.
1949	Into the Straight	Zara Marlowe		
1978	Tim	Mrs Harrington		
1979	The Journalist	Editor		
1982	Heatwave	Wealthy Woman		
1982	Starstruck	Pearl		
1985	I Can't Get Started	Avril Williams		
1987	The Place at the Coast	May Ryan		

=== Television ===
Year	Title	Role	Type	Ref.
1952	Leave It to the Girls	Panellist		
1952	I Found Joe Barton	Florrie	Short TV film	
1956	Lux Video Theatre	Laurie	Episode: "The Steel Trap"	
1956	The Twelve Pound Look	Kate	TV play	
1957	Three Cornered Moon	Leonara the Duchess of Mal	TV play	
1957	The Importance of Being Earnest	Gwendolyn Fairfax	TV play	
1957	Leave It to the Girls		21 episodes	
1958	A Rose Without a Thorn	Catherine Howard	TV play	
1960	Stormy Petrel	Elizabeth Macarthur	5 episodes	
1961	Whiplash	Anna Eddington / Rosie London / Terri McKenna	3 episodes	
1961	The Outcasts	Mrs John MacArthur	3 episodes	
1961	Two-Headed Eagle	The Queen	TV play	
1963	Flowering Cherry	Isobel Cherry	TV play	
1963	Don't Listen Ladies	Madeleine	TV play	
1964	Tribunal	Lady Emma Hamilton	1 episode	
1964	The Purple Jacaranda	Anne James	Miniseries, 7 episodes	
1967	Hunter	Valerie Cummings	2 episodes	
1969	Woobinda (Animal Doctor)	Helen Mason	1 episode	
1969	Voyage Out	Tessa	TV play	
1970	Eden House	Maxine	TV play	
1970	Phoenix Five	Dr Sarah Fall	1 episode	
1970	Delta	Veronica	1 episode	
1971	Catwalk	Marguerite Sommers	1 episode	
1973	Boney	Miss Jade	1 episode: "Boney and the Devil's Steps"	
1973	Division 4	Bella Morris	1 episode	
1974	Class of '75	Janet Henderson		
1975	Behind the Legend	Miss Brennan	1 episode	
1976	McManus MPB	Renee Soundtree	TV pilot	
1978	Run From the Morning	Mrs Hennessy	Miniseries, 6 episodes	
1979	Cop Shop	Pearl Singleton	2 episodes	
1979	Ride on Stranger	Lucy Rossingdale	Miniseries, 1 episode	
1979	The Mismatch		TV movie	
1979–1983	Patrol Boat	Matron Whylie	2 episodes	
1981	The Young Doctors	Louise Fielding	8 episodes	
1982–1985	A Country Practice	Caroline Smithers	8 episodes	
1983	M.P.S.I.B.		1 episode	
1983	Carson's Law	Mrs Emily Talbot	3 episodes	
1983	Prisoner	Sonia Hanlon	1 episode	
1983	The Girl From Moonooloo		TV movie	
1985	Colour in the Creek	Mrs Anderson	Miniseries, 5 episodes	
1988	Melba	Miss Dawson	Miniseries, 2 episodes	

== Theatre ==
Year	Title	Role	Type	Ref.
1943	Janie		Minerva Theatre, Sydney with J. C. Williamson's & Whitehall Productions	
1943	George Washington Slept Here		Minerva Theatre, Sydney with Whitehall Productions	
1947	Youth at the Helm		Minerva Theatre, Sydney with Whitehall Productions	
1948	A Pickwick Story		Sydney Town Hall with Mercury Mobile Players	
1950	Amphitryon 38		Independent Theatre, Sydney	
1954	Top of the Bill		Phillip St Theatre, Sydney	
1955–1956	Happy Returns		Phillip St Theatre, Sydney	
1956–1957	All for Mary	Mary Millar	Theatre Royal, Sydney, Her Majesty's Theatre, Brisbane, Roxy Theatre, Newcastle, Theatre Royal, Adelaide with J. C. Williamson's	
1959	For Amusement Only		Theatre Royal Sydney with J. C. Williamson's	
1960	The Rape of the Belt		Elizabethan Theatre, Sydney	
1962	Shipwreck	Lucretia	University of Sydney with AETT	
1964	Sweet Day of Decision		University of NSW Old Tote Theatre, Sydney with AETT	
1965	The Gallant Imposter, or She Wooed and She Would Not		Neutral Bay Music Hall, Sydney with George Miller	
1965	An Evening With Noel Coward		St James Playhouse, Sydney with AETT	
1966	Where Did Vortex Go?		Killara Soldiers Memorial Hall, Sydney	
1966	Summer of the Seventeenth Doll		AMP Theatrette, Sydney with Q Theatre Company	
1967	A Lily in Little India		Independent Theatre, Sydney	
1968	The Runaway Steamboat	Amy	Australia Hall, Adelaide with ATYP	
1968	Little Me	Miss Poitrine	Australian Production	
1970–1971	Charlie Girl	Kay Connor	St. James Theatre, Auckland, Her Majesty's Theatre, Melbourne with Williamson-Edgley Theatres	
1973–1974	Hamlet	Gertrude	Nimrod Theatre, Playhouse, Canberra	
1974	Don't Listen Ladies		Marian St Theatre, Sydney	
1975	A Slight Ache		AMP Theatrette, Sydney with Q Theatre Company	
1976	A Very Good Year		Music Loft Theatre, Sydney	
1976	All Over	The Mistress	Nimrod Theatre, Sydney	
1976	Alice in Wonderland	Queen of Hearts	York Theatre, Sydney with William Orr Productions	
1977	Revue at the Loft		Music Loft Theatre, Sydney	
1978	A Visit With the Family	Mother	Nimrod Theatre, Sydney	
1980	The Old Country	Bron	Comedy Theatre, Melbourne, Theatre Royal Sydney with Paul Dainty Corporation & Phillip Emanuel Productions	
1980	Mourning Becomes Electra	Christine	SGIO Theatre, Brisbane with QTC	
1982	You Can't Take It With You	Russian Grand Duchess	Sydney Opera House with STC	
1983	The Fields of Heaven		Sydney Opera House with STC	
1983	Sister Mary Ignatius Explains It All for You	Lead role	Phillip St Theatre, Sydney with Peter Williams Productions & Margaret Kelly, Productions	
1983	Tikki and Johns's Theatre Music Hall		Music Hall, Melbourne	
1985	Stepping Out		Australian tour with Promcon Corporation, Paul Dainty Corporation, Wilton Morley & Peter Davis	

== Radio ==
Year	Title	Role	Notes	Ref.
1941	The Youth Show	Golden Girl	2GB	
1940s	Heritage Hall		2UE / 2KO	
1950	Deadly Nightshade	Evelyn Channell		
1951	Stamboul Train	Carol Musker	2GB	
1952–	Leave It to the Girls	Panellist	2GB	
1953	Major Barbara	Major Barbara Undershaft	ABC Radio	
1953	A Place of Honour		2UW	
c.1953–1964	Life with Dexter	Jessie	2GB	
1954	The Merchant of Venice	Portia	ABC Radio	
1954	Fat Man		2UW	
c.1954	Stairway to Fame			
1954–1955	Reach for the Sky		2UE	
1955	1984	Julia	Lux Radio Theatre on 2GZ	
1955	Fallen Angel	Angel Fairfax		
1955	Bridge Against the Sky	Nola	ABC Radio	
1955	Harry Dearth's Playhouse: The Little Glass Clock		2UW	
c.1955	Starlight Theatre			
1956	Unknown Quantity	Sarah Travers		
1956	The Clock	Virginia	Episode 35: "Flaming Frances"	
1956	The Clock	Delilah	Episode 46: "Lefty & Delilah"	
c.1956	Short Story			
1959	Kind Hearts and Coronets	Lead role	ABC Radio	
1950s	Book Club of the Air		2TM	
1950s	Dinner at Antoine's	Odile St Amant	2UW / 3UZ	
1950s	The Right to Happiness	Joan	2UW / 3UZ	
1950s–1960s	Occupational Hazard			
1950s–1960s	Rick O'Shea			
1961	Cattleman			
1962	Sara Dane	Sara Dane		
c.1963	The Letter from Spain	Ethel Crewe		
1964	The Importance of Being Earnest	Lead role	ABC Radio	
1960s	The Big Fisherman			
1960s	Sound of Thunder	Sylvia Enger		
	Big City			
