= La Boheme (1961 film) =

- Directed by: Alan Burke
- Country of origin: Australia
- Original language: English

Production
- Running time: 106 mins

Original release
- Release: 22 June 1961

La Boheme is a 1961 Australian TV play, a film of Giacomo Puccini's opera La bohème. It was directed by Alan Burke.

== Cast ==
- Valda Bagnall as Mimi
- Rae Cocking
- Alistair Duncan
- John Faasen
- Alan Light
- Russell Smith
- Neil Warren-Smith
- John Young

== Production ==
Alistair Duncan did not sing. His singing voice was provided by Raymond McDonald. Duncan also did this in Land of Smiles (1962).

== Reception ==
The Sydney Morning Herald thought "the unashamed but essentially domestic and intimate sentiment" of the opera "proved exceptionally congenial to television" and thought it had "a technical excellence in presentation that might serve as a model for future televised operas. The performers were reasonably efficient in mouthing to their own prerecorded singing.. There was little outstanding singing, but plenty of competent workmanship."
