= Women's World (TV series) =

- Also known as: Woman's World
- Genre: Lifestyle show
- Country of origin: Australia
- Original language: English

Original release
- Network: ABC Television
- Release: 1956 – 1963

Women's World (also known as Woman's World) is an Australian television series which aired from 1956 to 1963 on ABC. Originally broadcast in Sydney and later Melbourne, it would appear the last couple years (and first few months) of the series were only broadcast in Sydney.

Some editions were made (and broadcast live) in Melbourne, but many were made in Sydney, and often telerecorded for Melbourne broadcast (see below).

The series was aimed at the housewives. For example, the 6 October 1959 episode was hosted by Joy Wren, featured a segment on cooking problems, a segment on knitwear, and music provided by Freddie Philips, a pianist. The Sydney-produced episode broadcast in Melbourne on 4 November 1959 featured Gwen Plumb as host, a segment on fashions in nylon, a book review and a piano interlude by Marie van Hove.

Competition in the time-slot varied depending on which ABC station it was shown on, and also depending on when the episode was broadcast. The time-slot itself also varied during the run, and the show usually aired more than once a week. In Melbourne, the 4 November 1959 episode mentioned above, for example, aired against The Honeymooners on HSV-7 and Autumn Affair on GTV-9. In Melbourne on 15 August 1960, competition in the time-slot included The Abbott and Costello Show on HSV-7 and Western Round-Up on GTV-9 (which consisted of B movie westerns like Alias Billy the Kid) For an episode broadcast Monday 11 February 1963 in Sydney (hosted Mary Rossi), competition in the time-slot included game show Say When on TCN-9, and game show Video Village on ATN-7.

== Episode status ==
The exact number of episodes still in existence is unknown.

Though not available for viewing, around 19 episodes of the series (along with segments from several other editions) are held by National Archives of Australia, per a search of the archives website (some are listed under the Woman's World title). Hosts of these episodes include Gwen Plumb, Jean Battersby, Corrine Kerby, and Mary Mackay. These episodes exist as 16mm film prints, sometimes known as telerecordings and sometimes as kinescope recordings, that were made of the program.

Two incomplete editions (again not available for viewing) are held by National Film and Sound Archive, also as telerecordings.
