= Three Cornered Moon =

- Ad from SMH 5 Mar 1957
- Genre: comedy
- Based on: play by Michael Arlen
- Directed by: Paul O'Loughlin
- Country of origin: Australia
- Original language: English

Production
- Production company: ABC

Original release
- Network: ABC
- Release: 5 March 1957 (Sydney, live)

Three Cornered Moon is a 1957 Australian television play starring James Condon.

== Plot ==
The play is set on the Duke of Mall’s yacht at Cannes years ago. Lenora, the Duke's wife, leaves her philandering husband. The Duke seeks solace in Lenora's identical twin sister in Paris.

== Cast ==
- James Condon as the Duke of Mall
- Margo Lee as the Duchess of Mall

== Production ==
Costumes were done by Thelma Afford. Desmonde Dowling did the set design. The play was broadcast live in Sydney.

== See also ==
- List of live television plays broadcast on Australian Broadcasting Corporation (1950s)
