= The Critics (TV series) =

- Genre: Talk show
- Country of origin: Australia
- Original language: English

Original release
- Network: ABC Television
- Release: 1959 – 1962

The Critics is an Australian television series which aired on ABC. Two versions were produced, one for Sydney and another for Melbourne. Debuting 1959, the Melbourne version ran to 1960, while the Sydney version ran to circa 1962.

== Format ==
A panel of three members would review or discuss three works, often a book, a film and an event. For example, in the 10 March 1960 Melbourne edition, the book was The Heroes by Ronald McKie, the film was The Wreck of the Mary Deare and the event was The Tommy Steele Show. In a 1959 Sydney edition (shown in Melbourne on 1 November 1959), the panel discussed Yugoslav State Company dancers and musicians, the novel Henderson the Rain King by Saul Bellow, and the Sydney appearance by U.S. rock singer Fabian.

== Episode status ==
It is not known how many episodes are still extant, given the erratic survival rate of 1950s/early 1960s Australian television series. Telerecordings of two or three episodes are held by National Archives of Australia.

== See also ==
- Any Questions
