= Nellie Lamport =

Australian actress (c. 1889/1890–1969)

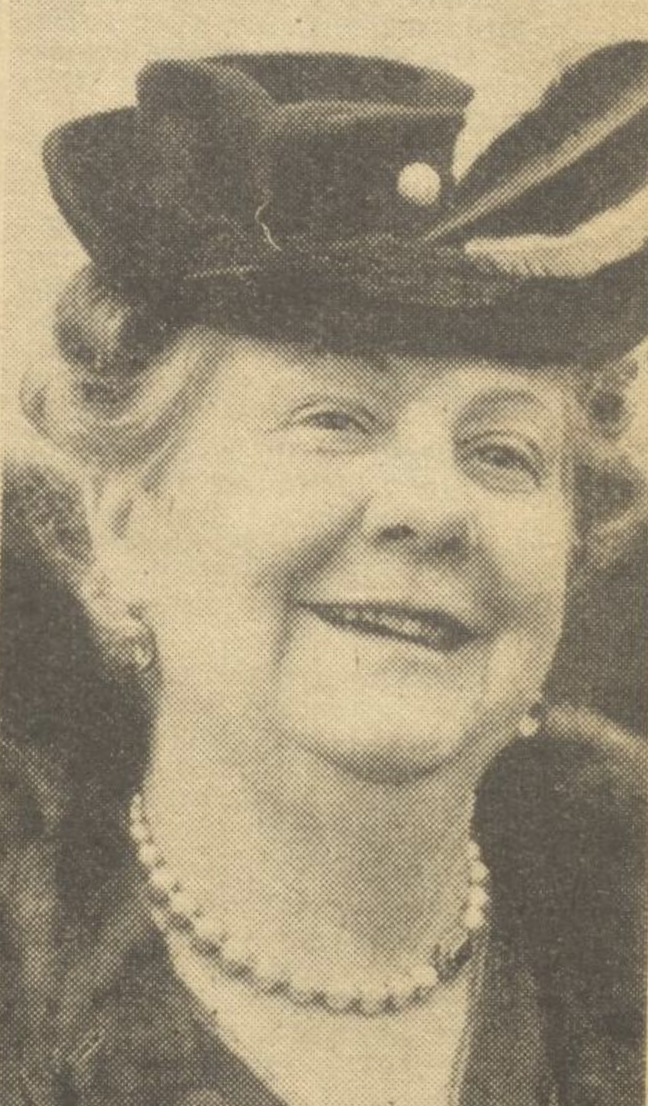
- Nellie Lamport in 1946
- Born: c. 1889/1890; Southampton, England
- Died: 23 June 1969 (aged 79); Sydney, Australia
- Occupation(s): Actress, singer
- Known for: Blue Hills and "The Lawsons" as Hilda Walters "Martin's Corner" as Granny Martin

Nellie Lamport (c. 1889/1890 – 23 June 1969) was a British-Australian actress and singer, known for the long-running ABC radio serial Blue Hills and its predecessor The Lawsons. as Hilda Walters, the Cook and Martin's Corner as Granny Martin

== Biography ==
She was born and grew up in Southampton, Hampshire, England and joined the chorus of a travelling company. She married mining engineer Godfrey Stevenson and in 1911 they emigrated to Queensland. They later moved to Northwood, New South Wales, where she became an avid gardener.

She was a leading member of the Studio Theatre Club.

Lamport played in the radio serial Martin's Corner as Granny for its 12 years to late 1952. In the ABC radio serials The Lawsons and Blue Hills she took the part of Hilda.

Her husband died on 20 November 1941 and Lamport sold up and moved into a house in Regent Street, Sydney.

She died on 23 June 1969, after four years' care in a private hospital in Sydney, aged 79. Her funeral was held at the Wayside Chapel. Actor Gordon Chater described her as "a splendid actress".
