= Josefina Niggli =

American dramatist (1910–1983)

Josefina Maria Niggli
- Born: Josephine Niggli; July 13, 1910; Monterrey, Nuevo León, Mexico
- Died: December 17, 1983 (aged 73); Cullowhee, North Carolina, United States
- Citizenship: US
- Education: Master's degree
- Alma mater: Incarnate Word College; University of North Carolina, Chapel Hill
- Occupations: Playwright; novelist; professor; screenwriter
- Writing career
- Language: English
- Genres: drama, novels
- Subjects: Mexican history and culture
- Notable work: Mexican Village

Josefina Niggli (1910–1983; birth name was Josephine) was a Mexican-born American playwright and novelist. Writing about Mexican-American issues in the middle years of the century, before the rise of the Chicano movement, she was the first, and for a time, the only Mexican American writing in English on Mexican themes; her egalitarian views of gender, race, and ethnicity were progressive for their time and helped lay the groundwork for such later Chicana feminists as Gloria Anzaldúa, Ana Castillo, and Sandra Cisneros. Niggli is now recognized as "a literary voice from the middle ground between Mexican and Anglo heritage." Critic Elizabeth Coonrod Martinez has written that Niggli should be considered on a par with such widely praised Spanish-language contemporaries as Mariano Azuela, Martín Luis Guzmán, and Nellie Campobello. She is thought to be the only Mexican-American woman to have a theatre named after her, the Niggli Studio Theater at Western Carolina University.

== Biography ==
Niggli was born on July 13, 1910, in Monterrey, Nuevo León, into an expatriated Euro-American family from the U.S. (her father, of Swiss-Alsatian descent, was from Texas, and her mother, who was Irish-French-German, from Virginia). Because of the Mexican Revolution, she was sent out of Mexico in 1913, and spent much of her youth between Monterrey and San Antonio, Texas. As a teenager in San Antonio, and in spite of being an Anglo, she felt that she did not belong, and wished to be back in Monterrey; these feelings formed the basis of her first book of poetry, Mexican Silhouettes, published in 1928 with the help of her father. As a student at Incarnate Word College, Niggli was prompted by her teachers to become a writer, leading to awards from Ladies' Home Journal and the National Catholic College Poetry Award. In 1938, Niggli wrote a collection of five one-act pieces, Mexican Folk Plays, which was published by the University of North Carolina Press. This collection touches on themes Niggli frequently addressed in her writing, ranging from pieces focusing on pre-Columbian Mexico to more contemporary history of Mexico's revolution.

Niggli was hired during World War II by NBC International to write Spanish-language messages for Latin American radio. Niggli became active as a writer and producer for San Antonio's KTSA radio station and studied play writing at the San Antonio Little Theatre (now known as the Public Theater of San Antonio), eventually joining the Carolina Playmakers at University of North Carolina at Chapel Hill, where she earned her master of arts degree. During this time, she continued to write about Mexican folklore and history, such as her play Soldadera, which depicted women soldiers (soldaderas) in the Mexican Revolution, particularly the tradition of La Adelita. After a brief stint on the faculty at UNC Chapel Hill, she moved to Mexico to work for playwright Rodolfo Usigli at the National Autonomous University of Mexico. In 1938, she published a collection of her plays, Mexican Folk Plays, with a preface by Usigli. Usigli, like Niggli, wanted to portray the history and challenges of a modern Mexico, and was supportive of her success in America.

In 1945, Niggli published her first novel-in-stories, Mexican Village, about a Mexican-born American (like Niggli, but male) who must confront problems with both American and Mexican cultures when he returns to Mexico. She followed this in 1947 with Step Down, Elder Brother, the Spanish translation of which "cemented Niggli's reputation as a giant of Mexican literature within the Latin American literary world." These novels, written in English, were meant to help her U.S. audience better understand both Mexico and the experiences of Mexican Americans; as such, she has been described by such critics as Gloria Anzaldúa as displaying a "border consciousness", a confusion of identity brought on by the process of Americanization.

When Mexican Village was picked up by Hollywood to be made into a movie (Sombrero, starring Ricardo Montalbán, Pier Angeli, and Cyd Charisse), Niggli moved to Hollywood and became a "stable writer" for Twentieth-Century Fox and MGM studios, working anonymously on such films as Seven Brides for Seven Brothers and The Mark of Zorro. The adaptation of Mexican Village involved quite a change in genre, being turned into a musical.

During the early part of the 1950s, Niggli began to work at Dublin's Abbey Theater until she began to teach. Niggli left Hollywood to teach English and drama at Western Carolina University, where she worked from 1956 to 1975, helping to found the Theatre Department; the university now houses a collection of her writings and a theater in her name. In 2009, the university sponsored a year-long, campus-wide theme in her honor: "Josefina Niggli: A Celebration of Culture, Art, and Life". While in North Carolina, she continued to write not only novels—her final novel, A Miracle for Mexico, was published in 1964—but also radio and television shows, including The Twilight Zone and Have Gun—Will Travel.

Niggli died on 17 December 1983 in Cullowhee, North Carolina. After her death, Niggli's work was for the most part forgotten until the 1990s, when literary scholars began to re-evaluate her work and Chicana/o writers began to acknowledge her as a trailblazer of the Chicana/o literature movement.

In 2005, Western Carolina University named the Niggli Studio Theater in her honor, in the university's newly opened John W. Bardo Fine and Performing Arts Center. She is thought to be the only Mexican-American woman to have a theatre named after her.

== Bibliography ==
=== Novels ===
- Mexican Village
- Step Down, Elder Brother
- A Miracle for Mexico

=== Plays ===
- Cry of Hidalgo
- Soldadera
- The Ring of General Macias
- The Red Velvet Goat
- Sunday Costs Five Pesos
- Singing Valley
- The Fair God
- The Cry of Dolores
- Azteca
- This Is Villa
- Tooth or Shave
- Sorella
- Yes, Nellie
- Grapes Are Sometimes Sweet
- The Defeat of Grandfather Devil
- The Street of The Canon

=== Poetry ===
- Mexican Silhouettes

=== Collections ===
- Mexican Village and Other Works (2007: Mexican Village; Step Down, Elder Brother; and five plays)

== See also ==
- Chicano literature

== Sources ==
- Coonrod Martínez, Elizabeth. Josefina Niggli, Mexican-American Writer: A Critical Biography. Albuquerque: University of New Mexico Press, 2007.
