= The Bread-Winner (play) =

1930 play by William Somerset Maugham

First US edition publ. Doubleday, Doran & Co.)

The Bread-Winner (1930) is William Somerset Maugham's third-last play. It is a comedy in one continuous act, lasting about 2 hours, but with the curtain lowered twice to rest the audience.

Charles Battle has been 'hammered' in the London Stock Exchange, to the point where he may be bankrupted. Maugham keeps his audience ignorant of the disaster facing Charles for much of the play, at which point we learn what the effect would be on his wife and teenage son and daughter. Charles' good friend Alfred Granger and his wife and son and daughter, all of whom are a similar age to their Battle counterparts, fill the scenes in the Battles’ house at Golders Green in London.

The play was in written in 1930 and first produced by Athole Stewart at the Vaudeville Theatre London on 30 September that year. Ronald Squire and Peggy Ashcroft played Charles and Judy Battle. The title format for the Vaudeville playbill, as reproduced in Who's Who in the Theatre, (Seventh edition, 1933) is The Breadwinner.

According to theatre archivist Robert Tanitch (Peggy Ashcroft, Hutchinson, 1987, ISBN 0-09-171030-8), one of Peggy Ashcroft's lines, "Don't you know that since the war the amateurs have entirely driven the professionals out of business? No girl can make a decent living now by prostitution," was quoted so much by 'the gentlemen of the Press' that it was cut after the first night, the management anticipating rightly that the Lord Chamberlain would be paying the theatre a visit.

The play has survived the years and is one of a number of Maugham’s works that has been resurrected. In April 2013, it was revived at the Orange Tree Theatre, Richmond, Surrey.
