= I Tell My Story =

- Genre: drama serial
- Running time: 15 mins (8:45 am – 9:00 am)
- Country of origin: Australia
- Language: English
- Syndicates: ABC
- Written by: John McKeller
- Narrated by: Alistair Duncan
- Original release: March 13, 1952

I Tell My Story is a 1952 Australian radio serial about Burke and Wills by John Mckellar. It came third in the ABC serial writing competition. (The competition was won by Two Worlds, second was Bejah Plants a Date Seed.)

The play aired the same year as another play about Burke and Wills, The Explorers. I Tell My Story was from the point of view of John King.

The play ran from Monday to Fridays. Alistair Duncan narrated.
