= Gwen Meredith =

Australian writer

- Born: Gwenyth Valmai Meredith; 18 November 1907; Orange, New South Wales, Australia
- Died: 3 October 2006 (aged 98); Bowral, New South Wales, Australia
- Education: Bachelor of Arts, University of Sydney
- Occupations: Radio scriptwriter; author; playwright; novelist
- Years active: 1932-1976 (retirement)
- Spouse: Ainsworth Harrison (m. 24 December 1938)
- Parent(s): George and Florence Meredith

Gwenyth Valmai Meredith OBE (18 November 1907 – 3 October 2006), also known by her married name Gwen Harrison, was an Australian radio entrepreneur and scriptwriter, dramatist and playwright, and novelist. She is best known for her creating and writing the radio serials The Lawsons (1944–1949) and the longer-running Blue Hills (1949–1976).

== Early and personal life ==
Meredith was born in Orange, New South Wales the only child of George and Florence Meredith, She attended Sydney Girls High School then went to the University of Sydney graduating with a Bachelor of Arts in 1929. Her father believed that, with the Great Depression, there were too many people needing jobs and that she should stay at home. She therefore managed the housekeeping and from 1932 to 1939, owned and operated a bookshop.

Meredith married Sydney engineer, Ainsworth Harrison, on 24 December 1938. He proved to be "a devoted and supportive husband" and travelled around Australia with her as she researched her serials. They also travelled overseas several times. In an interview, she told Arrow that, with the support of her father and then her husband, she never had to make a living from her writing, though believed she could have if she had needed to.

She lived in the Sydney suburb of Castlecrag, New South Wales for most of her working life in a house known as "the Gingerbread House" which is located at 369 Edinburgh Rd.

She retired in 1976 when the last episode of her most famous serial, Blue Hills, went to air, and she and her husband moved from their beachside home "Braybrook", in Seaforth, to the Southern Highlands of New South Wales, where she did watercolour painting. Her other interests were gardening, bushwalking and flyfishing. She died at her home at Bowral on 3 October 2006, aged 98.

== Career ==
=== Theatre ===
Meredith became interested in literature and with her father's financial backing, established and became the owner of the Chelsea Book Club in 1932 which she soon expanded to include a drama club "Chelsea Theatre Group" that performed her earliest plays, including her "witty and sophisticated Wives Have Their Uses" at St James' Hall, Sydney. Other plays were Murders Are Messy, Ask No Questions and Shout at the Thunder (these last two performed at the Independent Theatre). From 1939 to 1943, she worked as a freelance writer before commencing a 33-year career with the Australian Broadcasting Commission for which she wrote radio plays, serials and documentaries.

According to Michelle Arrow, Meredith entered a play competition in 1940 but was not selected as a winner by the judges. She did, however, win the listeners' poll.

=== Radio scriptwriting ===
Following this she wrote over 200 episodes of a radio serial Fred and Maggie and 50 episodes of Night Porter. She was then chosen to create the ABC's new radio serial in 1944, The Lawsons, as a propaganda medium to introduce modern agricultural methods to Australian farmers. It proved a highly successful drama that ran for 1,299 episodes from Monday 21 February 1944 to Friday 25 February 1949. It chronicled a family living on a rural property, and their battle to survive and to cope with sons being away at war. When the final episode was announced, The Sydney Morning Herald remarked that "to many people throughout the Commonwealth this will be almost a national day of mourning. The complicated affairs of the Lawson family, their friends and their enemies have made the serial the most popular in the history of Australian radio". A stage version of The Lawsons premiered in the Masonic Hall, Bathurst, New South Wales, on 28 January 1950. None of the radio cast appeared in the stage version, but it did include a young Ed Devereaux.

The Lawsons serial was replaced by the even more popular and longest running radio serial production Blue Hills, which comprised 5,795 episodes, all written by Meredith, and which ran for over 27 years, from 1949 to 1976. Her method of writing Blue Hills was unusual. Though she originally typed her own scripts, she soon progressed to a Dictaphone, later a small tape recorder, and this was transcribed by ABC typists for the actors to read. Blue Hills made her a household name in Australia.

There were several novels based on the serials, and a comic strip version of The Lawsons, which appeared in The ABC Weekly during the mid to late 1940s.

Besides these two long-running serials and Ask Ginger, a children's serial which ran for a few months 1949–50, Meredith was also a noted playwright; four of her plays (Ask No Questions (1940), Shout at the Thunder (1942), These Positions Vacant (1945)) and Cornerstone were performed by the Independent Theatre, Sydney.

== Select credits ==
- The Opportunist
- Great Inheritance

== Awards ==
- 1967: Appointed a Member (MBE) of the Order of the British Empire for her services to radio entertainment
- 1977: Elevated to Officer (OBE) of the order for her services to the arts.

== Bibliography ==
- Meredith, Gwen (1944). Wives Have Their Uses: A Comedy in Three Acts. Sydney: Mulga Publications. 81 pp.
- Meredith, Gwen (1945). Great Inheritance. Australia: RAAF Educational Services. 33 pp.
- Meredith, Gwen (1948). The Lawsons. Sydney: Angus & Robertson. 248 pp.
- Meredith, Gwen (1950). Blue Hills. Sydney: Angus and Robertson. 233 pp.
- Meredith, Gwen (1953). Beyond Blue Hills: The Ternna-Boolla Story. Sydney: Angus and Robertson. 244 pp.
- Meredith, Gwen (1961). Into the Sun: A Blue Hills Novel. Sydney: Angus & Robertson. 252 pp.
- Meredith, Gwen; Harrison, Ainsworth (1955). Inns and Outs. Sydney: Angus & Robertson. 249 pp.

== References and external links ==
- Adelaide, Debra (1986), Australian Women Writers: A Bibliographic Guide, London: Pandora
- Arrow, Michelle (11 October 2006). "Mistress of hearts and airwaves: Gwen Meredith, 1907–2006". The Sydney Morning Herald. p. 16. Archived from the original on 20 March 2014.
- Arrow, Michelle (2002), Upstaged: Australian women dramatists in the limelight at last, ISBN 978-0-86819-690-9
- Thompson, John (2006), "The mystery of The Lawsons", NLA News, XVI (5) – via National Library of Australia
- "Australian playwright Gwen Meredith dies". NineMSN. AAP. 4 October 2006. Archived from the original on 11 February 2012.
- Howard, John (4 October 2006). "Gwen Meredith OBE" (Press release). Archived from the original on 20 March 2014.
