= Don't Listen Ladies =

- Based on: a play of three acts translated from French
- Written by: Sacha Guitry (Fr.), transl. Stephen Powys and Guy Bolton.
- Directed by: James Upshaw
- Starring: Margo Lee; Neil Fitzpatrick
- Country of origin: Australia
- Original language: English

Production
- Producer: James Upshaw
- Running time: 80 minutes

Original release
- Release: 10 April 1963 (Sydney)
- Release: 12 June 1963 (Melbourne)

Don't Listen Ladies is a 1963 Australian TV movie. It starred Margo Lee and was directed by James Upshaw.

== Plot ==
In a French antique shop, Daniel and his second wife Madeleine have marital adventures. She finds a letter that makes her think he is having an affair. She encourages the love of Daniel's assistant, Blandinet. Also involved are Daniel's first wife Valentine, a former girlfriend called Julie, a young man called Michel who Madeleine thinks of marrying, and a customer Baron de Charancy.

== Cast ==
- Alex Archdale as Daniel Archelete
- Margo Lee as Madeleine
- Neva Carr Glynn as Julie
- Noel Brophy as Baron
- Neil Fitzpatrick as Blandinet
- Owen Weingott as Michel
- Audrey Teasdale
- Ronald Morse

== Reception ==
The Bulletin called it "harmless, tolerable entertainment." The Sydney Morning Herald praised Archdale's performance.

== See also ==
- List of television plays broadcast on Australian Broadcasting Corporation (1960s)
