= James III =

James III may refer to:

- James III of Cyprus (1473–1474)
- James III of Majorca (c. 1315–1349)
- James III of Scotland (1451–1488)
- James III, Margrave of Baden-Hachberg (1562–1590)
- James Francis Edward Stuart (1688–1766), pretender who styled himself James III of England and Ireland, and James VIII of Scotland

== Fictional characters ==
- James III, King of the United Kingdom in the film Red, White & Royal Blue (2023)
