= Leave It to the Girls (Australian TV series) =

- Genre: Talk show
- Based on: Leave It to the Girls by Martha Rountree
- Presented by: Terry Dear
- Country of origin: Australia
- Original language: English

Original release
- Network: ATN-7; GTV-9
- Release: March 1957 – 1958

Leave it to the Girls is one of the earliest Australian television series. Based on the American radio and television series of the same name, it aired on ATN-7 and GTV-9 starting March 1957. The Melbourne run ended in October that same year, but the series continued in Sydney into 1958. It was a televised simulcast of a Macquarie Radio Network series, reflecting how new television was to Australia. It was sponsored by Rinso laundry detergent, and hosted by Terry Dear.

== Format and episode status ==
Essentially a discussion series, three women and two men answered questions, topics and problems submitted by viewers. Seven episodes of the television series are held as kinescope recordings by the National Film and Sound Archive, and are among the earliest surviving examples of Australian television (among the episodes listed includes the first episode). The archive also holds various radio episodes.
