= Johnny Belinda (Shell Presents) =

- Shell Presents episode
- Episode no.: Season 1 Episode 1
- Directed by: David Cahill
- Teleplay by: Richard Lane
- Based on: Johnny Belinda by Elmer Blaney Harris
- Original air date: 4 April 1959
- Running time: 60 mins

Guest appearance
- Kathleen Gorham

Episode chronology
| ← Previous — | Next → "Other People's Houses" |

"Johnny Belinda" is a 1959 Australian television adaptation of the 1940 play by Elmer Harris which had been filmed in 1948. It was the first "live" one hour drama on commercial television in Australia.

It was shown live on 4 April 1959 in Sydney, recorded and shown later in Melbourne. Australian television drama was relatively rare at the time.

The play was the first episode of Shell Presents, a regular series of Australian dramas.

== Plot ==
In Nova Scotia, a deaf mute girl is raped.

== Cast ==
- Kathleen Gorham as Belinda McDonald
- James Condon as Dr Davidson
- Robina Beard
- Kevin Brennan as Black McDonald
- Michael Cole as man who assaults Belinda
- Eve Hardwicke as the rapists wife
- Mark Kelly
- Olive Walter
- Nellie Lamport
- Leonard Lee
- John Morris
- Nancye Stewart

== Production ==
It was decided to do this play first as, reportedly, it was the first play for which the rights could be obtained. The story was well known to Australian audiences because of the 1948 film. The rival TCN-9 channel sought an injunction to prevent the play's telecast on the grounds that TCN owned the Australian film rights to this movie, but this was rejected by the courts.

The adaptation was by Richard Lane who had extensive experience writing radio drama and had written Autumn Affair for Channel Seven. It was produced by Brett Porter and directed by David Cahill. Cahill's wife Keitha Munro was wardrobe mistress.

The director David Cahill foind it difficult to find to Belinda he was happy with. His wife, a dancer, suggested that a dancer could play the part. The role was given to Kathy Gorman, a ballerina who had never had a straight dramatic part before although she had played the title role in a musical, Alice in Wonderland at the Philip St Theatre. Gorham was cast in part because her ballet skills were useful for the miming part of the role. She went to the Adult Deaf and Dumb Society to be coached in sign language.

"I didn't want to make meaningless gestures", said Gorham. "I wanted to be completely accurate in everything I did in the part. I went along to an expert and learned the correct signs and movements. I found the language very beautiful. There is a lot of ballet in their movements and gestures."

The production was filmed in a studio on four sets. (Another account says three - the interior of the farmhouse, the village street and the inside of a mill.) It was designed by Kelvin Cameron and the construction team was led by Vernon Best. Two studio days were allowed to set up lighting and props prior to camera rehearsal.

David Cahill praised Brett Porter's role in encouraging using angles and shooting as components of telling a story visually rather than thinking of it as a stage play.

Len Mauger, then in charge of live productions at Channel Seven, later recalled, "It was very satisfying to be associated with the first commercial live play in Australia but it was nerve-racking. People say that video tape makes for better productions nowadays because you can edit and re-record. That's probably true, but video took away that adrenalin, both in the performer and the producer, that said it had to be good because you couldn't go back and do it again."

Head of ATN, R. H. Henderson, said the play cost £6,000. He said later dramas cost less but were much more expensive to make than variety shows which could be produced for £2,000 an hour. The cast of 65 was the largest ever for a local television drama. Sponsors agreed to play £3500 for telecast over four states: NSW, Queensland, Victoria and South Australia.

== Reception ==
The Sydney Morning Herald reported that after the production aired, the switchboard at ATN-7 "was jammed for more than half an hour" by "well-wishers" with "make-up artists, studio assistants and newsroom reporters helped cope with congratulatory calls".

=== Audience ===
The audience was estimated at 300,000.

=== Critical ===
The TV critic for the Sydney Morning Herald though the production showed the "remarkable grip that Australian television artists and technicians are getting upon the problems of telecasting live drama" with "many of the excitements that belong to a live-show as you might see it in a theatre... all the inimitably exciting bets and gambles and desperate prayers that a live show has." He thought the production did not "sink into sentimentality more than once or twice" but the one hour time limit did prevent them "from establishing some points needed for the integrity of the play as a whole", notably the superficial depiction of the rapist and the village gossip. He thought Gorham "played the main role sensitively" and "her mime was fascinating."

The TV critic for the Australian Woman's Weekly said, "cheers and a long ovation are in order" for the production. "It was splendidly produced and thoroughly good entertainment" in which Gorham "gave a first-class performance" and James Condon "took the acting honors. If it is a sample of what is to come in the scheduled dramas to be presented every month, viewers are lucky indeed."

Gorham's performance won her an award.

=== Influence ===
The program was highly acclaimed and pointed to the possibilities of local Australian drama production. The chairman of the Elizabethan Theatre Trust, Dr H. C. Coombs, said the introduction by ATN-7 of locally produced plays was a "fine idea." He said the encouragement of local talent might help to stem the movement of Australian actors and actresses overseas. The play was discussed in the House of Representatives. L. D. Clay said the play proved beyond a shadow of doubt that Australian actors were equal if not superior to any in the world and asked the Postmaster-General, C. W. Davidson, to ensure that other stations followed ATN 7's example. Davidson said the play was laudable and would certainly be followed by productions by other television stations. J. F. Cope used the play, along with Big, Blue and Beautiful, Thunder of Silence and Other People's Houses in an argument to Parliament in favour of a quota for Australian productions.

Many of the same creative team went on to work on the serial The Story of Peter Grey.

== See also ==
- List of television plays broadcast on ATN-7

== Notes ==
- McPherson, Ailsa (2007). "Dramas and Dreams at Epping: Early Days of ATN-7's Drama Production". In Liz, Liz; Dolin, Tim (eds.). Australian Television History. ACH: The Journal of the History of Culture in Australia. Australian Public Intellectual Network. pp. 163–166.
