= Diana Perryman =

Australian actress

- Born: 9 November 1924; Melbourne, Australia
- Died: 10 January 1979 (aged 54); Sydney, Australia
- Occupation: Actress
- Years active: 1946–1977
- Family: Jill Perryman (sister)

Diana Perryman (9 November 1924 – 10 January 1979) credited also as Diane Perryman, was an Australian actress, who appeared on stage, and in film and television.

== Early life ==
Perryman was born in Melbourne in 1924 to father, Melbourne-born musical comedy actor and radio station 2KY personality William Harland-Perryman (with notable credits from 1919 to 1938), and mother, Adelaide-born actress, singer and showgirl Dorothy Eileen Duval (with credits from 1923 to 1932). Her parents were married in 1923, the year before she was born.

Her first acting credit was as a child, on stage in a crowd scene role in White Horse Inn in 1936, alongside her parents and her two year old sister Jill.

Perryman studied acting alongside Maggie Dence, Leonard Teale and Ruth Cracknell.

== Career ==
Perryman was notable for her roles in early television soap operas and appeared in miniseries and made-for-tv movies, She appeared for 156 episodes in the tv series Autumn Affair with Muriel Steinbeck and Queenie Ashton. She was also a regular in tv soap The Story of Peter Grey.

Perryman also appeared in numerous theatre productions and radio plays throughout her career, including turning in an Erik Award-winning performance in stage play Two for the Seesaw in 1960.

== Personal life ==
Perryman's younger sister is stage and screen actress and singer Jill Perryman. Through her sister, she has a nephew, Tod Johnston who is an actor, musician and media personality; and a niece, Trudy Dunn who is an actress. Trudy's daughter McKenzie Dunn is also an actress.

Diana's husband, Dr. Kenneth Whiteley was a senior lecturer in wool technology at the UNSW and a huge fan of the theatre. Together with sister Jill's dancer/choreographer husband, Kevan Johnston, he urged Perryman to collaborate with her sister, which prompted her to switch to revue.

Perryman was posthumously awarded an MBE in 1979.

== Filmography ==
=== Film ===
Year	Title	Role	Type
1959	Shell Presents	Inez	TV movie series, season 1, episode 2: Other People's Houses
1960	The Scent of Fear	Joan Bridey	TV movie
1961	Corinth House	Madge Donnythorpe	TV movie
1961	The Big Client	Eleanor Comely	TV movie
1964	I Have Been Here Before	Sally Pratt	TV movie
1968	Tosca	Tosca	TV movie
1972	Yeoman of the Guard		TV movie
1975	I'm Here, Darlings!		TV movie

=== Television ===
Year	Title	Role	Type
1958–1959	Autumn Affair	Julie	TV series, season 1, 156 episodes
1961	The Story of Peter Gray	Jane Marner	TV series, season 1, 156 episodes
1964	The Purple Jacaranda	Darcy Crawford	TV miniseries, 7 episodes
1967	You Can't See 'Round Corners		TV series, season 1, 3 episodes
1970	The Link Men		TV series, season 1, 2 episodes
1972	Catwalk	Mrs. Wheeler	TV series, season 1, episode 7: "Dear Desperate"
1973	Boney	Mrs. White	TV series, season 2, episode 7: "Boney Hunts a Murderess"
1973	Serpent in the Rainbow	Mrs Quigg	TV miniseries, 4 episodes
1974	This Love Affair	Kath	TV series, season 1, episode 8: "One of My Silly Dreams"
1973; 1975	Certain Women	Alice	TV series, 2 episodes
1975	Behind the Legend	Mrs. Plummer	TV series, season 3, episode 9: "Annette Kellerman"
1975	Shannon's Mob	Mrs. Pellini	TV series, season 1, episode 2: "Nothing Else to Lose"
1976	The Outsiders	Marilyn	TV series, season 1, episode 1: "Drop Out"
1979	Glenview High	Shirley Mason	TV series, season 1, episode 30: "Daughter of Darkness"

== Radio ==
Year	Title	Role	Venue / Co.
1949	Princess Precious Pearl		
1950	Sonata	Therese, Countess von Brunswick	Lux Radio Theatre on 2UW Sydney, 3DB Melbourne, 4BK & SAD
	The Air Adventures of Biggles	Pat Kendall	Radio serial on 2GB Sydney, 2CH Sydney & 2KO Newcastle, episodes 269–625
1955	Adam Had Four Sons		Radio play, episode 170 of The General Motors Hour
1955	Rope		Radio play, episode 171 of The General Motors Hour
1955	Love from a Stranger		Radio play, episode 183 of The General Motors Hour
1955	Don't Listen Ladies		Radio play, episode 203 of The General Motors Hour
1955–56	White Coolies		Radio serial
1956	The White Rabbit		Radio serial on 2UE Sydney
1956	The Prisoner of Zenda		Radio play, episode 208 of The General Motors Hour
1956	The Pet Shop		Radio play, episode 211 of The General Motors Hour
1956	The Human Touch		Radio play, episode 215 of The General Motors Hour
1956	The Nine Days Wonder		Radio play, episode 217 of The General Motors Hour
1957	A Pin to See the Peep Show		Radio play, episode 293 of The General Motors Hour
1957	Autumn		Radio play, episode 301 of The General Motors Hour
1957	Home is the Sailor		Radio play, episode 307 of The General Motors Hour
1958	Each Wind That Blows		Radio play, episode 311 of The General Motors Hour
1958	The American		Radio play, episode 313 of The General Motors Hour
1958	Queen Bee		Radio play, episode 323 of The General Motors Hour
1958	Simon and Laura		Radio play, episode 329 of The General Motors Hour
1958	Seat of the Scornful		Radio play, episode 330 of The General Motors Hour
1958	Subway in the Sky		Radio play, episode 332 of The General Motors Hour
1958	The Quiet Room		Radio play, episode 355 of The General Motors Hour
1958	Search by Night		Radio play, episode 362 of The General Motors Hour
1958	Land of Promise		Radio play, episode 363 of The General Motors Hour
1958	The Young May Moon		Radio play, episode 364 of The General Motors Hour
1958	The Uninvited		Radio play, episode 368 of The General Motors Hour
1959	Flood		Radio play, episode 382 of The General Motors Hour
1959	After My Fashion		Radio play, episode 384 of The General Motors Hour
1959	Young Timothy		Radio play, episode 386 of The General Motors Hour
1959	Broken Journey		Radio play, episode 404 of The General Motors Hour
1959	The Fifty Mark		Radio play, episode 408 of The General Motors Hour
1959	The Guiding Light	Dr Mary Leland	Radio serial on 2UW Sydney for Grace Gibson Radio & TV Productions
1960	Love and Miss Figgis		Radio play, episode 413 of The General Motors Hour
1960	The Long Dark Road		Radio play, episode 430 of The General Motors Hour
1960	The Silent Inn		Radio play, episode 438 of The General Motors Hour
	A Stop on the Way		Radio play, episode 455 of The General Motors Hour
	The Letter		Radio play, episode 463 of The General Motors Hour
1960	Life with Dexter	Jessie	Radio serial on 2GB Sydney
1961	Cattleman		Radio serial for Grace Gibson Radio & TV Productions
	Rebel in White	Jan Regan / Elvira	Radio serial
	King Neptune and the Mermaid		Radio series
	This Man is Mine		Radio serial for Grace Gibson Radio & TV Productions
	The Big One Got Away		Radio serial for Grace Gibson Radio & TV Productions
1974	Under Her Spell	Julia Winslow	Grace Gibson Radio & TV Productions

== Theatre ==
Year	Title	Role	Venue / Co.
1936	The White Horse Inn		Northern Queensland tour (together with father Bill Perryman, mother Dorothy Duval and sister Jill Perryman)
1946	Invisible Circus	Iris Mitchell	Independent Theatre, Sydney
1946	Twelfth Night		Independent Theatre, Sydney
1946	Soldier's Wife		Minerva Theatre, Sydney with Whitehall Productions
1947	Pirandello	The Daughter	Independent Theatre, Sydney
1947	Awake My Love	Linda Manners	Independent Theatre, Sydney
1948	They Walk Alone	Bess Stanforth	Independent Theatre, Sydney
1948	Mourning Becomes Electra	Lavinia	Independent Theatre, Sydney
1949	Love Me Sailor	Ella	National Canvas Theatre, Sydney
1949	Salome	Salome	Independent Theatre, Sydney
1950	Dream Girl		Minerva Theatre, Sydney with Whitehall Productions
1950	Dark of the Moon		Independent Theatre, Sydney
1949; 1950	Bonaventure	Sarat Carn	Theatre Royal Sydney, Comedy Theatre, Melbourne, His Majesty’s Theatre, Melbourne with J. C. Williamson's
1955	Independent Theatre Twenty-Fifth Birthday Celebration		Independent Theatre, Sydney
1955	Winter Journey	Georgie Elgin	Independent Theatre, Sydney
1956; 1957	The Reluctant Debutante	Mabel Crosswaite	Theatre Royal, Adelaide, Theatre Royal Sydney, Comedy Theatre, Melbourne with J. C. Williamson's
1957	The Big Knife		Independent Theatre, Sydney
1958	Titus Andronicus		Independent Theatre, Sydney
1960	Two for the Seesaw	Gittel	Theatre Royal Sydney with J. C. Williamson's Won 1960 Best Actress Erik Award
1960	The Way of the World	Millamant	Independent Theatre, Sydney
1961	Phaedra	Phaedra	Independent Theatre, Sydney
1962	Shadow of Heroes		Independent Theatre, Sydney
1963	Flaming Youth		Phillip Street Theatre, Sydney
1963	Do You Mind!		Phillip Street Theatre, Sydney (with sister Jill Perryman)
1964	Heartbreak House		UNSW with Old Tote Theatre Company
1965	A Severed Head		Phillip Street Theatre, Sydney, Comedy Theatre, Melbourne, Canberra Theatre with J. C. Williamson's
1969	You Know I Can't Hear You When the Water's Running		Phillip Street Theatre, Sydney with Harry M. Miller
1976	Equus	Hester Saloman	Seymour Centre, Sydney with Old Tote Theatre Company
1977	The Father	Laura	UNSW Parade Theatre, Sydney with Old Tote Theatre Company

== Awards & honours ==
Year	Title	Award	Category	Result
1960	Two for the Seesaw	Erik Award	Best Actress	Won
1979	Diana Perryman	MBE		Honoured
