= June Salter =

Australian actress (1932–2001)

June Salter AM
- Born: June Marie Salter; 22 June 1932; Bexley, New South Wales, Australia
- Died: 15 September 2001 (aged 69); Mosman, Sydney, New South Wales, Australia
- Occupations: actress; author
- Years active: 1959–2000
- Known for: The Mavis Bramston Show; Certain Women; The Restless Years; A Country Practice; Neighbours
- Spouse: John Meillon (1958–1971)
- Children: John Meillon Jnr

June Marie Salter (22 June 1932 – 15 September 2001) was an Australian actress and author prominent in theatre and television. She is best known for her character roles, in particular as schoolteacher Elizabeth McKenzie in the soap opera The Restless Years and for her regular guest appearances in A Country Practice as Matron Hilda Arrowsmith.

== Early life and education ==
June Marie Salter was born on 22 June 1932 in Bexley, New South Wales, the youngest of six children of Arthur Edward Salter (born c. 1887) and his wife Edna Edythe Salter (died 24 July 1969), who married in 1916 and had a home on Henderson Road, Bexley.

Salter attended Kogarah Central Domestic Science Secondary School, where her first stage role was playing Queen Elizabeth in their production of The Tudor Wench. She obtained her New South Wales Intermediate Certificate in 1947.

While working as a typist-receptionist, Salter joined the St George Players, performing at Sydney's St James' Hall (later renamed Mercury Theatre, then Phillip Street Theatre). She also took elocution lessons from Rosalind Kennerdale and her husband Lawrence H. Cecil).

== Career ==
=== Radio ===
In 1952, largely through Rosalind Kennerdale and Lawrence H. Cecil's influence, Salter began landing acting roles in 2GB's radio serial Night Beat, while continuing her office work part-time.

With the help of fellow actress Queenie Ashton, Salter was accepted onto the books of Central Casting (Ashton's husband John Cover's company) and further radio work followed on serials including Martin's Corner on 2UW, Undercover Carson and Shadows of Doubt on 2GB.

She also had a stint on long-running radio serial Blue Hills for the ABC, in which she played Sally Edwards, taking over the role from original actress Barbara Brunton.

=== Stage ===
After years of amateur productions, including St George United Artists' Rookery Nook at St James' Hall, Salter was invited to take part in Bill Orr's 1953 production of Hit and Run (the first Phillip Street Revue). She followed this with Hat Trick, opposite Charles Tingwell, Gordon Chater, Bettina Welch, John Ewart, Lyle O'Hara and Ray Barrett. This was followed by a prominent role in Hot from Hollywood starring Mel Tormé and Irene Ryan, then Laugh Around the Clock with Billy Russell and Gordon Chater at Tivoli Theatres in Sydney and Melbourne. Her next Phillip Street Revue was the long-running Cross Section co-starring first with Ruth Cracknell, then John Meillon.

Salter relocated to London after getting married in 1958, when husband John Meillon was offered a series of film roles in London. Apart from a few quick trips home, they remained in the UK together until 1963. But while Meillon was much in demand, no film opportunities arose for Salter, so when offered work in television, she jumped at the chance.

Back in Australia, Salter appeared on stage Rattle of a Simple Man at the Phillip Theatre, co-starring with Meillon who had just returned from London. She starred in There Will Be an Interval of 15 Minutes, again for Bill Orr. Comedy stints at Frank Strain's "Bull 'n' Bush" theatre restaurant followed.

Salter's next major role was in Crown Matrimonial as Queen Mary, a critically acclaimed performance and a role she regarded as her greatest achievement. This was followed by Night Mother with Jill Perryman for Edgar Metcalfe at the Perth Playhouse, before touring in the production nationally.

A string of comedy roles for Peter Williams followed, including playing Madame Arcati in Blithe Spirit, Sheila in Relatively Speaking and Delia in Bedroom Farce. She also played Sophie in Mother's Day at the Ensemble Theatre for Edgar Metcalfe. In 1982, she performed in a production of The Anniversary with The Restless Years cast at Phillip Street Theatre, after the series had come to an end.

Another notable performance came when Salter teamed with Ruth Cracknell, to play eccentric spinsters in Lettice and Lovage for Sydney Theatre Company, which opened in 1989 at the Sydney Opera House. Additionally, she delivered an acclaimed performance as Mrs. Danvers in a 1991 stage adaptation of 1940 Hitchcock film Rebecca at Marian Street Theatre. The following year she performed again at Marian Street, with Love Letters and On Golden Pond, playing Ethel Thayer in the latter. She also performed Lettice and Lovage once more, this time with Judi Farr and directed by Peter Willams.

Salter's 1993 one-woman cabaret revue, June Salter – A Legend at the Tilbury Hotel in Woolloomooloo was met with rave reviews in the Sydney Morning Herald, before touring New South Wales. She followed this with The Last Night of the Proms at the Sydney Opera House, to celebrate its twentieth anniversary.

In 1999, Salter appeared as Ann in The Cocktail Hour at Marian Street Theatre. That same year, she played Frau Schmidt in a touring production of The Sound of Music, alongside Lisa McCune and Rob Guest, continuing into 2000.

=== Television and film ===
Salter was one of the earliest performers on Australian television, singing "I'm Getting Nothing for Christmas" from the current Phillip Street Revue at the ATN7 studios in December 1956. It was Channel 7's first television broadcast. Her next television appearance (having just returned from London) was a singing spot on Channel 7's Studio A with the Tommy Tycho orchestra, followed a successful run in The Mavis Bramston Show variety sketch series with Gordon Chater, Carol Raye, and Barry Creyton, initially as a guest then co-star.

Salter then starred in the short-lived Catwalk, a series created specially for her. This was followed with a starring role in long-running ABC drama series Certain Women as solicitor Freda Lucas, appearing in a total of 600 episodes. She also featured in 1976 film Caddie, playing Mrs Marks, opposite Jacki Weaver.

However, Salter remains best known for her role as one of the original characters, middle-aged spinster and schoolteacher Elizabeth McKenzie in the soap opera The Restless Years and for her regular guest appearances in A Country Practice as Matron Hilda Arrowsmith.

Salter played Lady Cliquot in the 1981 film Doctors and Nurses, Hannah Wilde in Wilde's Domain (1982) and Eleanor Roosevelt in The Last Bastion (1984). She then played Jim Robinson's mother Bess, in the first season of long-running soap opera Neighbours.

Salter also made guest appearances in numerous other series (mostly for Crawford Productions) including Cop Shop, Division 4, Matlock Police, Number 96, G.P., Murder Call, All Saints, Holiday Island, The Sullivans, The Adventures of Skippy and Farscape.

Salter was honoured as the subject of a 1978 episode of This Is Your Life.

In 1995, Salter published her autobiography, "A Pinch of Salt".

== Personal life ==
In 1958, Salter appeared opposite John Meillon in the Phillip Street revue Cross Section. In May of the same year, actor Meillon proposed to Salter and they were married on 21 June 1958 at St James’s Church of England, Sydney.

The pair had a son, John Meillon Jr. who was born in 1961, while they were in the UK. There were years of separation due to the demands of their separate careers. Meillon's problems with alcohol were also a contributing factor.

The relationship ended when Meillon found a new love and the couple divorced in 1971. Salter and John Jr. then lived for some time with longtime acquaintance Gwen Friend, sister of the painter Donald Friend. Salter never remarried and was distraught when Meillon died in 1989.

== Death ==
Salter underwent an operation for oesophageal cancer in 2001, but the cancer reappeared later that year. After being admitted to Mosman Hospital, she died two weeks later, on 15 September 2001 at the age of 69.

She was survived by her son, John Meillon jnr.

== Filmography ==
=== Film ===
Year	Title	Role	Type	Ref.
1973	Love at First Sight		Film short	
1976	Caddie	Mrs. Marks	Feature film	
1977	Dot and the Kangaroo	Mrs. Platypus (voice)	Animated feature film	
1981	Doctors and Nurses	Lady Cliquot	Feature film	
1993	Shotgun Wedding	Voice	Feature film	

=== Television ===
Year	Title	Role	Type	Ref.
1959	Shell Presents		TV play: "They Were Big, They Were Blue, They Were Beautiful"	
1963	ITV Play of the Week	Tess	TV play: "The Heart of the Country"	
1963	The Scales of Justice	Receptionist	Episode: "Position of Trust"	
1964	The One That Got Away	Mrs. Dawson	TV movie	
1965	Wednesday Theatre		TV play: "Rusty Bugles"	
1965	My Brother Jack		1 episode	
1965–1967	The Mavis Bramston Show	Various characters		
1969	The Candidates		TV special	
1969	A Hard Day's Week		TV series	
1969	I've Married a Bachelor	Margie Bates	Episode: "In the Key of a Flat"	
1969	News Revue	Various characters		
1969–1971	Division 4	Pam Sloan (1969) / Lillian Jordan (1970) / Mrs. Harvey (1971)	Episodes: "The Takings" (1969) / "The Tangled Web" (1970) / "Everyone Loves a Prang" (1971)	
1970	The Link Men	Judy Raymond	1 episode	
1970	The Kelly Gang		TV pilot	
1971	Matlock Police	Ellen Carey	1 episode	
1971	The Godfathers	Madame Zelda	1 episode	
1971–1972	Catwalk	Paula Healy	14 episodes	
1972	Redheap		3 episodes	
1972	Birds in the Bush (aka The Virgin Fellas)		1 episode	
1972	A Nice Day at the Office	Senate Committee Woman	1 episode	
1972	Boney	Mrs. Larkins	1 episode	
1972–1977	Certain Women	Frieda Lucas	166 episodes	
1973	Seven Little Australians	Miss Ada	Miniseries, 1 episode	
1973	The Evil Touch	Louise Carlyle	Episode: "The Upper Hand"	
1977	Hotel Story	Annabelle Lee	1 episode	
1977	Bluey	Lilly Morris	Episode: "A Touch of Stardust"	
1977	Number 96	Meg Robinson	4 episodes	
1977	The Young Doctors	Elizabeth Neilsen	5 episodes	
1977–1982	The Restless Years	Miss Elizabeth McKenzie	780 episodes	
1978	Because He's My Friend (aka Love Under Pressure)	Val	TV movie	
1979	Cop Shop	Pauline Clarke	2 episodes	
1981	Holiday Island	Faye	Episode: "The Horse Race"	
1981	The Sullivans	Mamie Spencer	2 episodes	
1982	Wilde's Domain	Hannah Wilde	TV movie	
1982	Jonah		Miniseries, 4 episodes	
1982	Living Together		TV pilot	
1983	Secret Valley		Episode: "The Worm Turns"	
1983	Learned Friends	Guest role		
1983	A Country Practice	Hannah Green	Episodes: "Have I Got a Deal for You" (Parts 1 and 2)	
1984	Who Killed Hannah Jane?	Mrs. Edwards	TV movie	
1984	The Last Bastion	Eleanor Roosevelt	Miniseries, 3 episodes	
1985	The Adventures of Robin Hood	Voice	Animated TV movie	
1985	Neighbours	Bess Robinson	8 episodes	
1985	The Lancaster Miller Affair	Maud Lancaster	Miniseries, 3 episodes	
1985; 1987; 1989-1990	A Country Practice	Matron Hilda Arrowsmith	16 episodes	
1986	Butterfly Island		1 episode	
1988	Emma: Queen of the South Seas	Mrs. Dr. Lane	Miniseries, 2 episodes	
1989	Rafferty's Rules	Diedre Potter	Episode: "The Plague"	
1990	G.P.	Evelyn Anderson	Episode: "Thicker Than Water"	
1991	Boys from the Bush	Sarah	Episode: "State and Commonwealth"	
1992	The Adventures of Skippy	Eleanor	Episode: "Skippy and the Orchid"	
1995	After the Beep	Kath Dillon	7 episodes	
1996	G.P.		Episode: "The Waiter"	
1998	Murder Call	Dolly Carlisle	Episode: "Short Circuit"	
1998	All Saints	Sister Marguerite	Episodes: "Crimes of the Heart" and "Touch and Go"	
1999	Farscape	Dimensional Being (voice)	Episode: "Through the Looking Glass"	
1999	Time and Tide	Dorothy	TV movie	
2000	Search for Treasure Island	Mrs. Silver	8 episodes	

=== Television (as self) ===
Year	Title	Role	Type
1975	This Is Your Life	Guest	Episode: "Andrea"
1978	This Is Your Life	Surprise guest	1 episode
1983	The River of Giants	Narrator	TV documentary

== Theatre ==
Year	Title	Role	Type	Ref.
1952	Rookery Nook	Rhoda Marley	St James' Hall, Sydney	
1953	His Excellency	His Excellency's daughter	Independent Theatre, Sydney	
1953	All My Sons	Anne	Metropolitan Theatre, Sydney	
1954	Jitta's Atonement	Daughter of Jitta's lover	Metropolitan Theatre, Sydney	
1954–1955	Hit and Run		Phillip St Theatre, Sydney	
1955	Hat Trick		Phillip St Theatre, Sydney	
1955	Hot from Hollywood	Singer	Tivoli Theatre, Sydney	
1955–1956	Laugh Around the Clock	Soubrette	Tivoli Theatre, Sydney	
1955–1956	Happy Returns		Phillip St Theatre, Sydney	
1957	Around the Loop		Phillip St Theatre, Sydney	
1957–1958	Cross Section		Phillip St Theatre, Sydney	
1964	Rattle of a Simple Man	Cyrenne	Phillip St Theatre, Sydney	
1967	There Will Be an Interval of 15 Minutes		Phillip St Theatre, Sydney	
1972	A Dead Liberty	Ginny	AMP Theatrette, Sydney with Q Theatre	
1978–1980; 1985–1986	Crown Matrimonial	Queen Mary	York Theatre, Sydney, Mayfair Theatre, Sydney	
1980	Gypsy	Momma Rose	SGIO Theatre, Brisbane with QTC	
1981	Together Tonight		Peppermint 80's, Sydney	
1982	The Anniversary	Mum	Phillip St Theatre, Sydney	
1984–1985	'night, Mother	Thelma	Playhouse, Perth, Canberra Theatre	
1987	Blithe Spirit	Madame Arcati	Sydney Opera House, Glen St Theatre, Sydney, Canberra Theatre, Newcastle Civic Theatre	
1988	Relatively Speaking	Sheila	Glen St Theatre, Sydney, Canberra Theatre, Seymour Centre, Sydney	
1988	Mother's Day	Sophie Greengrass	Canberra Theatre, Ensemble Theatre & NZ tour	
1989	Bedroom Farce	Delia	Glen St Theatre, Sydney & NSW tour	
1989–1990; 1992	Lettice and Lovage	Lotte Schoen	Australian tour with STC	
1990	Blithe Spirit	Madame Arcati	Illawarra Performing Arts Centre, Twelfth Night Theatre, Brisbane, Gold Coast Arts Centre, Laycock St Theatre, Gosford, Sydney Opera House	
1990; 1992	Love Letters	Melissa Gardner	Sydney Opera House	
1991	Rebecca	Mrs. Danvers	Marian St Theatre, Sydney	
1992	On Golden Pond	Ethel Thayer	Marian St Theatre, Sydney	
1993	June Salter: A Legend	Solo revue	Tilbury Hotel, Sydney, Newcastle	
1993	Follies	Solange LaFitte	State Theatre, Melbourne	
1993–1994	The Last Night of the Proms		Sydney Opera House	
1995	The Secret Garden	Mrs Medlock	QPAC, Brisbane, State Theatre, Sydney, State Theatre, Melbourne	
1996	Tilbury Hotel 10th Aniversary Gala		Tilbury Hotel, Sydney	
1998	Painting Churches		Marian St Theatre, Sydney with Northside Theatre Company	
1999	The Cocktail Hour	Ann	Marian St Theatre, Sydney	
1999–2000	The Sound of Music	Frau Schmidt	Lyric Theatre, Sydney, Princess Theatre, Melbourne, QPAC, Brisbane	

== Radio ==
Year	Title	Role	Notes	Ref.
1952	The Winner	The girlfriend		
1952–1953	Night Beat		2GB / 2UE	
1952–1954	Blue Hills	Sally Edwards	ABC	
1954	Book Club of the Air		2TM	
1954	The Tudor Wench	Elizabeth Tudor	The General Motors Hour	
1954	Martin's Corner		2UW	
1954	Undercover Carson		2GB	
1954	Shadows of Doubt		2GB	
1954	Icarus Preserved	Lead role	2FC	
1955	Fallen Angel			
1955–1956	White Coolies	Iole Harper		
1956	Smell of Terror	Denise	2GF	
1959–	Command Performance			
1950s–1960s	Life in the Balance			
1950s–1960s	A Shot in the Dark			
	Adopted Son	Leslie Mitchell		
	Fascination			
1963	Flynn	Rosetta Flynn	BBC Radio	
1986	Memory as Desire	Charlotte Sturt	ABC	

== Awards and honours ==
Year	Work	Award	Category	Result	Ref.
1975	Certain Women	Penguin Award		Won	
1976	Certain Women	Penguin Award		Won	
1977	Hotel Story	Sammy Award	Best Actress in a Single TV Performance	Won	
1977	June Salter	Queen's Silver Jubilee Medal		Honoured	
1978	The Restless Years	Sammy Award	Golden Sammy Award for Continued Excellence in Television	Won	
1978	Crown Matrimonial	Glugs Award		Won	
1982	June Salter	Member of the Order of Australia (AM), Australia Day Honours	For service to the performing arts	Honoured	
1985	Who Killed Hannah Jane?	Penguin Award		Won	

== Sources ==
- Salter, June A Pinch of Salt, Angus & Robertson 1995 ISBN 0-207-18188-8
