= Reflections in Dark Glasses =

- Shell Presents episode
- Advertisement from 6 Feb 1960
- Episode no.: Season 1 Episode 12
- Directed by: David Cahill
- Teleplay by: James Workman
- Original air date: 6 February 1960
- Running time: 48 mins (without commercials)

Episode chronology
← Previous "No Picnic Tomorrow"	Next → "Man in a Blue Vase"

"Reflections in Dark Glasses" is an Australian television film, or rather a television play, which aired in 1960. It aired as part of Shell Presents, which consisted of monthly presentations of stand-alone television dramas. It was written by Sydney writer James Workman, and is notable as an early example of Australian-written television drama. It was broadcast live in Sydney on 6 February 1960, then recorded and shown in Melbourne.

Unlike some Australian television of the early 1960s, the program still exists, as a kinescope recording held by the National Film and Sound Archive.

The program was much acclaimed.

Filmink called it "a minor gem... visceral, dark, intense – and extremely moving. (It also has the best poster art from any Australian TV play I’m familiar with – kudos to that designer, whoever she or he was.)".

== Plot ==
A disturbed woman keeps searching for her young son. She tries to pick him up at school, but he isn't there. She insists that her husband took her son away. She threatens her mother in law with a pair of scissors.

== Cast ==
- Muriel Steinbeck as Nancy Roberts
- James Condon as John Roberts
- Ruth Cracknell as Mary
- Winifred Green as Agnes Roberts
- Eve Hardwicke as Miss Truelove
- Margaret Moore as Nurse

== Production ==
Muriel Steinbeck, who played the lead role, had previously been the lead actress in Autumn Affair, the first Australian-produced television soap opera. An additional soap connection is provided by another cast member, James Condon, who later played the title role in soap opera The Story of Peter Grey. Originally broadcast in Sydney, it was shown (via early video-tape) in Melbourne at a later date. It may also have been shown in Perth.

Producer Brett Porter said, "this is a most imaginative TV production, calling for a high degree of creativeness in lighting, camera work and sound. It offers Muriel Steinbeck a real acting tour de force." Porter said ATN-7 had searched for a script to star Steinbeck for some time. It was the fourth production of Shell Presents written by an Australian author with an Australian setting especially for the show (although Workman was born in Scotland he lived in Australia).

== Reception ==
The TV critic for The Sydney Morning Herald called it a "cleverly-constructed psychological thriller... imaginatively acted and directed" in which Muriel Steinbeck "in a role tailor-made for Bette Davis or a Barbara Stanwyck... acted with great style and polish, moving smoothly through the moods of whimsy menace and slight madness which the part demanded. David Cshill's cunning direction and lighting always, underlined, and at one or two points dramatically highlighted, the effects Miss Steinbeck was trying to achieve." He thought the "psychological truth" of the play "may be a little dubious, and its ending is a bit pat" but "there were enough edge-of-the-chair moments to keep cold logic suspended."

Val Marshall from the Sunday edition of same paper called it "the finest all-Australian production yet done in the Shell Presents series. It was first-class in all fields — writing, acting, camera work, and music background. I would say that here was a play which could well hold its own in any part of the world."

FilmInk magazine said "Steinbeck's TV appearances in the early sixties tended to be "wives" – Thunder on Sycamore Street (1960) and Stormy Petrel (1960)... But she had one outstanding chance on the small screen, in the original Australian TV play Reflections in Dark Glasses (1960). She plays a wife and a mother, sure, but this time the part had some meat on its bones – her character has a breakdown convinced that her child has been stolen. Reviews were superb. Why don't the National Film and Sound Archive make these productions easily available online?"

== See also ==
- List of television plays broadcast on ATN-7
