= The Purple Jacaranda =

Television series

- Ad from SMH 28 Jun 1964
- Genre: Drama
- Based on: The Purple Jacaranda by Nancy Graham
- Written by: Richard Lane
- Starring: James Condon; Margo Lee; Ronald Morse; Diana Perryman; Walter Sullivan; John Unicomb
- Country of origin: Australia
- Original language: English
- No. of seasons: 1
- No. of episodes: 7

Production
- Producer: Colin Dean
- Running time: 30 minutes

Original release
- Network: ABC Television
- Release: 28 June – 9 August 1964

The Purple Jacaranda is an Australian television mini-series which aired on ABC in 1964, based on a novel by Nancy Graham and billed as the national broadcaster's first suspense serial. Cast included James Condon, Margo Lee, Ronald Morse, Diana Perryman, Walter Sullivan and John Unicomb.

It was first broadcast on 28 June 1964, in Sydney. The final episode was shown on 9 August.

== Plot ==
Anne James is asked by Colonel Thomson of "Security" (ASIO) to visit and stay with her friend Darcy, now married to David Crawford. The Crawfords live at "Jacaranda House", in Sydney. Anna has misgivings but eventually agrees.

== Cast ==
- Margo Lee as Anne James
- Diana Perryman as Darcy Crawford
- Ronald Morse as Colonel Thomson
- Walter Sullivan as David Crawford
- James Condon as artist Max Stevenson
- Nick Tate as Bill
- Camilla Christensen as Kelly
- John Unicomb as Bannister
- Aileen Britton as Housekeeper
- John Fegan as Detective

== Episode guide ==
No.	Original release date
1	28 June 1964
Anne James, living in Perth, is confronted by Colonel Thomson of Security who asks her to travel to Sydney and stay with her friend Darcy, who has recently married David Crawford.
2	5 July 1964
3	12 July 1964
4	19 July 1964
5	26 July 1964
6	2 August 1964
7	9 August 1964

== Background ==
In the early 1960s, ABC aired a series of historical mini-series: Stormy Petrel (1960), The Outcasts (1961), The Patriots (1962), and The Hungry Ones (1963). The Purple Jacaranda, however, featured a then-contemporary setting. It was based on a 1958 radio serial which in turn was based on a novel. Exteriors for the mansion were shot in Sydney.

Colin Dean said historical "serials take years of research and steeping in the period. Writers can't produce one at a moment's notice. I quite like this year's change to a modern serial, but I would be sad if we stopped doing historical serials. They are very rewarding."

The set designer was Desmonde Dowling. The main interior set, a private house, was built at the ABC Studios in Gore Hill, Sydney; exteriors were shot at the municipal library in Mosman. Other locations included the Commonwealth Centre and the northern Sydney beaches.

== Reception ==
Unlike the historical serials, which got largely positive response by viewers and critics, The Purple Jacaranda was a critical failure.

Reviewing the pilot episode the Tribune said "It has its moments but the stiff and stagey acting and production will need to improve if it is to hold the viewer's attention." The Australian Women's Weekly said it " didn't come to life in its first episode. The good part of it was producer Colin Dean's opening sequence of the body on the beach, the skilful blending of indoor and outdoor shots, and John Unicombe's acting as Bannister; the bad parts of it were some bad flaws in the story, the general air of unreality, and the overacting of the ladies."

The Canberra Times called it "the unintentionally funniest thing the A.B.C. has ever done."

The Tribune later said "A completely wrong slant has been given to what is supposed to be a thriller. Every element of surprise is telegraphed and foreshadowed. The actors move like automatons and with about as much feeling. The dialogue which is certainly not very good is made even worse by this treatment."

The Canberra Times said ", Richard Lane's script would have been funny, had not Colin Dean's direction been vulgar."

The Bulletin said "Perhaps the most harshly treated is Margo Lee. In the first episode she was a young woman intelligent enough to be asked to shadow dangerous criminals. Since then she has represented simpering stupidity. Miss Lee still wears a look of pained surprise at this perfidy on the part of the scriptwriter."

The Women's Weekly later called it "hideous".

The Sunday Sydney Morning Herald said "what a sorry business it turned out to be."

Richard Lane called it "disappointing".
