= Michael Cole (singer) =

Australian singer and actor

Michael Cole was an Australian singer and actor. He appeared in a number of Australian musicals.

== Select TV credits ==
- Johnny Belinda (1959)
- Pardon Miss Westcott (1959)
- Gaslight Music Hall (1959)
- Luther (1964)
- Northern Safari (1966) - singer
- Homicide - various guest roles
- The ABC of Love and Sex: Australia Style (1977)
- Skyways - various roles
- Cop Shop - various roles
- Prisoner: Cell Block H - various roles

== Select theatre credits ==
- Lola Montez (1958)
