= No Picnic Tomorrow =

- Shell Presents episode
- Ad in SMH 9 Jan 1960
- Episode no.: Season 1 Episode 11
- Directed by: Rod Kinnear
- Teleplay by: Barbara Vernon
- Original air date: 9 January 1960
- Running time: 60 mins

Episode chronology
← Previous "Pardon Miss Westcott"	Next → "Reflections in Dark Glasses"

"No Picnic Tomorrow" is an Australian television drama one-off which aired in 1960 on ATN-7 in Sydney and GTV-9 in Melbourne (as this was prior to the creation of the Seven Network and Nine Network). Part of the Shell Presents series of one-off television dramas and comedies, it was produced in Melbourne, but first shown in Sydney on 9 January 1960, and on 23 January 1960 Melbourne.

== Plot ==
An Australian woman, Gwennie, and a man of Greek descent, Tony, intend to marry. However Tony's mother decides to arrange a marriage between him and a Greek woman who is coming to Australia.

== Cast ==
- Margaret Browne as Gwennie
- Robin Ramsay as Tony
- Peter Aanensen as Mr Sweeney
- Marjorie Archibald as Mrs Sweeney
- Nina Black as Mrs Demetrius
- Carol Armstrong as Greek girl
- Bruce Archer

== Production ==
The drama was written by Barbara Vernon, best known at the time for writing the play The Multi-Coloured Umbrella (adapted for television in 1958), and who had previously written the ABC TV comedy one-off The Passionate Pianist in 1957. It was filmed at GTV-9 studios and on location in Melbourne.

Margaret Brown filmed the role during a two-week break from her regular job.

Duration was 60 minutes including commercials (running time excluding commercials is not known. Homicide episodes from the mid-1960s typically run 45–47 minutes, while some early locally produced hour-long programming on commercial television could run as long as 51 minutes).

== Reception ==
The TV critic from the Sydney Morning Herald thought "the promising basic situation" of the play "suffered, as written, from lack of richness in characterisation and dialogue and, as performed, from the flat low-voltage personalities of the mainly Melbourne players... the play's important dramatic issue... is stated... but not dramatised with any intensity."

Another critic thought it was "not up to the standard" of The Big Day but was "a fair effort" where the "cast, although inclined to be a bit too doggedly Australian at times, acted with sincerity and conviction."

== See also ==
- A Little South of Heaven - 1961 ABC television play with a similar theme
- List of television plays broadcast on ATN-7
