= Jill Perryman =

Australian actress (born 1933)

Jill Perryman AM, MBE
- Born: 30 May 1933 (age 93); Melbourne, Victoria, Australia
- Occupations: Actress; singer
- Years active: 1936–2006
- Known for: Work with J. C. Williamson theatre, musical theatre performer
- Notable work: Film and TV...Maybe This Time; Bellbird; Changi; Stage: Funny Girl; I Do! I Do!; The Two of Us; No, No, Nanette; A Little Night Music; Annie; Hello, Dolly!; The Boy from Oz
- Spouse: Kevan Johnston
- Children: Tod Johnston, Trudy Dunn
- Parent(s): William Harland-Perryman, Dorothy Perryman Duval
- Family: Diana Perryman (sister); Bill Perryman (brother)

Jill Perryman (born 30 May 1933) is an Australian retired actress, singer and dancer with a career that spanned 70 years. Perryman is from a family of show business performers; her sister was actress Diana Perryman and her son is media personality, radio and TV presenter and musician Tod Johnston.

Perryman, although a staple of theatre, appeared briefly in film; for her debut film role in Maybe this Time in 1980, she was awarded the AACTA Award for Best Actress in a Supporting Role (known then as the AFI Awards) and has also appeared as a guest in numerous TV series and as herself.

Perryman has been honoured with both the MBE (1979) and Member of the Order of Australia (1992), both with the citation "For service to the Performing Arts".

== Career ==
Perryman became a staple of Australian showbusiness, having performed on stage from the age of three in a production of the famed Austrian operetta The White Horse Inn.

Perryman in 1952, then aged 19, joined the company of J. C. Williamson Theatres Ltd as a member of the chorus and in the following year was understudying leading roles in stage musicals, under Evie Hayes in a local production of Call Me Madam.

Perryman was strong in voice and personality, and a long series of understudy and small roles eventually led her, through the recommendation of John McCallum (who was then joint managing director of J. C. Williamson Theatres), to take the lead in the key Australian production of Funny Girl, a performance that won her an Erik Award for Best Actress and led to major roles in other productions. These included I Do! I Do! in 1969, and The Two of Us in 1971. No, No, Nanette in 1972 won her another Erik Award for Best Actress for her role as Lucille Early, then in 1973 she starred in A Little Night Music. In 1976 she played Gladys Zilch in Leading Lady, a musical production created especially for her. She also toured during 1977 in Side by Side by Sondheim. She played Miss Hannigan in Annie in 1978.

Perryman won the A.F.I. (Australian Film Institute) Award for Best Actress in a Supporting Role in 1980.

She toured in the musicals Chicago in 1988 and The Boy From Oz in 1998.

== Personal life ==
Perryman was born in May 1933 in Melbourne, Victoria, into a family of performers. Her father was Melbourne-born actor William Harland-Perryman and her mother was Adelaide-born actress and singer Dorothy Eileen Duval; they had married in 1923.

Perryman is married to choreographer Kevin Johnston, and they have a son and daughter. Their son Tod Johnston is an actor, musician and media personality, and their daughter is actress Trudy Dunn. Trudy's daughter McKenzie Dunn is also an actress.

== Theatre ==
Year	Show	Role	Notes
1953	Call Me Madam	Ensemble (u/s Mrs Sally Adams)	Australian tour starring Evie Hayes
1954	Paint Your Wagon	Elizabeth Woodling	Australian tour
1955	Can-Can	Celestine	Australian tour
1957	The Pajama Game	Mabel	Australian tour starring Toni Lamond
1962	Carnival!	Rosalie	Australian tour
1965	Hello, Dolly!	Irene Molloy	Australian tour starring Carole Cook as Dolly Levi
1966	Funny Girl	Fanny Brice	Australian tour
1969	I Do! I Do!	Agnes	Australian tour
1972	No, No, Nanette	Lucille Early	Australian tour starring Cyd Charisse
1973	A Little Night Music	Countess Malcolm	Australian tour
1977	Side by Side by Sondheim	Herself	Australian tour
1978	Annie	Miss Hannigan	Australian tour
1983	Noises Off	Dotty Ottley	Australian tour
1983	Chicago	Mama Morton	Playhouse Theatre, Perth
1984	‘night, Mother	Jessie Cates	Australian tour
1985	Brighton Beach Memoirs	Blanche	Australian tour
1994	Hello, Dolly!	Dolly Levi	Australian tour
1998	Follies	Carlotta Champion	Sydney Opera House concert
1998	The Boy from Oz	Marion Woolnough	Australian tour

== Filmography ==
=== Film ===
Year	Title	Role	Type
1980	...Maybe This Time	Mother	Feature film
1986	Windrider	Miss Dodge	Feature film
1990	The Swan		Film short
1993	Love in Limbo	Aunt Dorry	Feature film
2006	Hidden Creatures	Doris	Film short

=== Television ===
Year	Title	Role	Type
1957	Pantomime Quiz	Guest	TV series, 1 episode
1962	The Good Oil	Bunny	TV film
1966	BP Super Show	Guest Singer	TV series, 1 episode
1966	The Mavis Bramston Show	Various characters	TV series
1969	Sydney Tonight	Guest	TV series, 1 episode
1970	The Mike Walsh Show	Guest	TV series, 1 episode
1971	Dynasty	Jenny Farmer	TV series, 1 episode
1972	Matt Flinders	Guest	TV series
1972	Kamahl	Guest	TV series, 1 episode
1972	Perryman on Parade	Guest	TV series, 6 episodes
1972	Bobby Limb's Sound of Christmas	Guest	TV special
1973	Jill	Herself	TV special
1974	The Firm		Film documentary
1974	The Ernie Sigley Show	Guest	TV series, 1 episode
1975	The Graham Kennedy Show	Guest	TV series, 1 episode
1975	Bellbird	Cheryl Turner (regular role)	TV series
1976	Homicide	Kate Holsworth	TV series, 1 episode
1976	This Is Your Life	Special Guest	TV series, 1 episode: "Jill Perryman"
1976	Quest	Herself	TV series
1977	Royal Children's Hospital Good Friday Appeal	Guest	TV special
1978	Cappriccio!	Guest	TV series, 1 episode
1978; 1984; 1985	The Mike Walsh Show	Guest / singer	TV series, 3 episodes
1978	Tickled Pink	Vera	TV series, 1 episode 4: "Palace of Dreams"
1978	The Peter Couchman Show	Guest	TV series, 1 episode
1979	The Jill Perryman Show	Herself	TV special
1979	Saturday Special	Guest	TV series, 1 episode
1980; 1982	Parkinson In Australia	Guest	TV series, 2 episodes
1980	Home Sweet Home	Mother Superior	TV series, 1 episode
1980	1980 Australian Film Awards	Winner – Best Actress in Support Role (for Maybe This Time)	TV special
1980	John Singleton Show	Guest	TV series, 1 episode
1980	Carols By Candlelight	Herself/Performer	TV Special
1981	The World Around Us	Herself as Presenter	TV series, 1 episode "Africa The Dispossessed"
1981	The 1981 Australian Film Institute Awards	Performer	TV special
1982	Parkinson In Australia	Guest	TV series, 1 episode
1985	Flight into Hell	Recurring role	TV miniseries
1985-1993	The Midday Show	Guest / singer	TV series
1987	Have a Go	Guest Judge	TV series, 4 episodes
1989	In Melbourne Today	Guest	TV series, 1 episode
1989	The Bert Newton Show	Guest	TV series, 1 episode
1989	The Flying Doctors	Josie Sterling	TV series, 1 episode
1989-1990	A Country Practice	Lois Gardiner	TV series, 4 episodes
1992	In Sydney Today	Guest	TV series, 1 episode
1992	Clowning Around	Miss Gabhurst	TV miniseries, 2 episodes
1992	Legends In Cabaret	Singer	TV special
1992	The Morning Show	Guest	TV series, 1 episode
1993	At Home	Guest	TV series, 1 episode
1994; 1995; 1998; 1999	Good Morning Australia	Guest	TV series, 4 episodes
1997	Hey Hey It's Saturday	Guest	TV series, 1 episode
1998; 1999	Denise	Guest	TV series, 2 episodes
2001	Changi	Older Kate	TV miniseries, 1 episode
2008	Talking Heads	Guest	TV series, 1 episode
2011	The Helpmann Awards	Honouree – JC Williamson Award (with Nancye Hayes & Toni Lamond)	TV special

== Honours and awards ==
Association	Award	Year	Results
Australian Government	Order of the British Empire (MBE).	1979	Honoured
Australian Government	Order of Australia (AM).	1992	Honoured
AACTA Awards	AACTA Award for Best Actress in a Supporting Role	1980	Won
Erik Award	Best Actress for Funny Girl	1971	Won
Erik Award	Best Actress for No, No Nanette	1972	Won
Helpmann Awards	JC Williamson Award	2011	Honoured
Mo Awards	Female Musical Theatre Performer of the Year	1995	Won
Equity Awards	Lifetime Achievement Award	2013	Honoured
