= James Condon =

Australian actor (1923–2014)

- Born: James Thomas Condon; 27 September 1923; Fremantle, Western Australia, Australia
- Died: 14 February 2014 (aged 90); Narrabeen, New South Wales, Australia
- Occupations: Actor; scriptwriter; voice over
- Years active: 1941–2003
- Spouse(s): Joan Cranmer (?-1977); 4 children Anne Haddy (1977–1999; her death)

James Thomas Condon (27 September 1923 – 14 February 2014) was an Australian pioneering actor of early theatre, radio and television, as well as a scriptwriter and voice over, primarily a character actor or supporting player, he was best known for his numerous radio and television roles in serials and television movies particularly, although he did play the title character in the early local TV soap opera The Story of Peter Gray

He briefly had small guest roles in the internationally popular TV drama's Prisoner and two different guest parts in Neighbours alongside his wife, series regular Anne Haddy.

== Early life ==
James Thomas Condon was born in Fremantle, Western Australia. Condon was the brother of actress and theatre producer Coralie Condon, who was a recipient of the Order of Australian and was known as "The First Lady of Western Australian Television", and had a brother, Terry.

== Career ==
He started his career in repertory theatre alongside his sister Coralie in 1941, before he joined ABC Radio in Perth in 1942. He served with the Royal Australian Air Force during World War II, being promoted to flight lieutenant.

After the war, Condon went to England and worked for the BBC before returning to Australia in 1951 to resume his acting career, working on radio serials, including Portia Faces Life. When TV arrived in Australia in 1956, he moved to Sydney and appeared on the opening night of ABN2, Sydney, and in a number of ABC plays, including Tomorrow's Child and A Phoenix Too Frequent.

He played the lead role in ATN7's The Story of Peter Grey, one of the first soap opera dramas produced for Australian television in 1961.

Also in 1961, while hosting his variety show What's Next, Condon hosted an old friend from Perth, Ray Hartley, to talk about his recent successes in London and New York. Hartley was a world-class Australian pianist, composer, arranger and philanthropist.

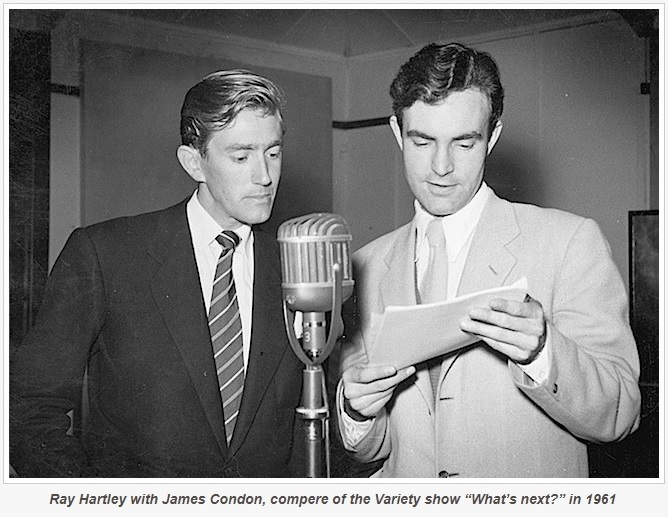
Ray Hartley and James Condon, 1961

He made many other appearances on television, including Homicide, Matlock Police, Number 96 (both the TV serial and the 1974 feature film spin-off, playing different characters) and Bellamy.

Television roles also include The Young Doctors, Carson's Law, Sons and Daughters,, The Flying Doctors, Blue Heelers and Something in the Air.

== Filmography ==
=== Film ===
Year	Title	Role	Type
1958	The Stowaway	The Purser	Feature film
1959	Desert Conquest	Narrator	Documentary film
1973	The Three Musketeers	Voice	Animated TV movie
1974	Number 96	Nicholas Brent	Feature film spin-off
1975	Scobie Malone	Walter Helidon	Feature film
1976	Silent Night, Holy Night	Voice	Animated TV movie
1978	Cass		TV movie
1979	Tim	Mr Harrington	Feature film
1979	Barnaby and Me	The Chairman	TV movie
1981	Hoodwink	Newsreader	Feature film
1984	Super Sleuth	Dennis Powell	TV movie
1985	The Boy Who Had Everything	Televisio Newsreader	Feature film
1986	Body Business	Sir Charles	TV movie
1988	Backstage	Frank Turner	Feature film
1988	Evil Angels	Reginald Scholes	Feature film
1989	Trouble in Paradise	Captain Londstrom	TV movie
1990	Bony	Tom Hemmings	TV movie
1991	The Private War of Lucinda Smith	Mr Spencer Grant	TV movie
1991	Spotswood ( aka The Efficiency Expert)	Executive 1	Feature film
1997	Kangaroo Palace	Judge	TV movie

=== Television ===
Year	Title	Role	Type
1957	Three Cornered Moon	Duke of Mall	TV play
1957	Tomorrow's Child		TV play
1957	A Phoenix Too Frequent	Tegeus	TV play
1957	The Importance of Being Earnest	John Worthing	TV play
1958	Point of Return		TV play
1958	Sixty Point Bold	President Ortega de Riverde	TV play
1958	An Enemy of the People	Dr Stockman	TV play
1959	Lady in Danger	Bill Sefton	TV play
1959-60	Shell Presents	John Roberts / Dr Davidson	TV play series, 2 episodes
1960	Stormy Petrel	Colonel Maurice O'Connell	TV series, 1 episode
1960	The Life and Death of King Richard II	Bolingbroke	TV play
1961	The Big Client	JG Henderson	TV play
1961	Play of Daniel	Narrator	TV play
1961	The Story of Peter Grey	Peter Grey	TV series, 156 episodes
1961	The Outcasts	Colonel Maurice O'Connell	TV series, 1 episode (sequel to Stormy Petrel)
1961	What Next	Host	TV variety show
1962	The Patriots	William Wentworth	TV miniseries, 10 episodes
1962	Jonah	William Wentworth	TV series, 2 episodes: "The Marquis of Mullambimbee", "The Treaty of South Island"
1963	The Long Sunset	Arthur	TV play
1964	Tribunal	James Connolly	TV series, 1 episode
1964	The Purple Jacaranda	Max Stevenson	TV miniseries, 7 episodes
1964	The Play of Herrod	Narrator	TV play
1966	Point of Departure	Molac	TV play
1966-72	Homicide	Christoper White / Gerard Naismith	TV series, 2 episodes
1968	Contrabandits	Austin	TV series, 1 episode
1969	I've Married a Bachelor		TV series, 1 episode
1970	The Link Men		TV series, 1 episode
1970	The Rovers	John Fleming	TV series, 1 episode
1970	Chequerboard	Creon	TV series, 1 episode
1971-72	Catwalk	Ray Shannon	TV series, 1 episode
1972	Matlock Police	Eric Bard	TV series, 1 episode
1972-73	Number 96	S r Arnold Ashton	TV series, 9 episodes
1972-75	Behind the Legend	Wentworth	TV series, 3 episodes
1974	Ryan	John Moss	TV series, 1 episode
1975	Shannon's Mob	Sir Arthur Maitland	TV series, 1 episode
1976	McCloud	Charles Oakland	TV series, 1 episode
1976	Luke's Kingdom	Jason Firbeck	TV series, 13 episodes
1976	King's Men	Petersen	TV series, 1 episode
1977	The Young Doctors	Sir Thomas Kendall	TV series, 40 episodes
1978	Case for the Defence	Nathan	TV series, 1 episode
1979	Chopper Squad	Norman Chambers	TV series, 1 episode
1979	Carrots	Horace W Hathaway	TV series, 1 episode
1980	Cop Shop	Doug Francis	TV series, 7 episodes
1981	Bellamy	Daley	TV series, 21 episodes
1982	1915	Mr Gillen	TV miniseries, 1 episode
1982	Secret Valley		TV series, 1 episode
1982	Der Schwarze Bumerang	Arzt	TV miniseries, 1 episode
1983	The Catlins	Senator Mahoney	TV series, 1 episode
1984	Sons and Daughters	Sean O'Donnell	TV series, 6 episodes
1984	Carson's Law	Attorney General / Sir Harold Watson	TV series, 3 episodes
1982-88	A Country Practice	Flynn / Michael Christie / Doug Abbott / James Saunders	TV series, 7 episodes
1985-86	Neighbours	Douglas Blake	TV series
1985-86	Prisoner	James Dwyer	TV series, 23 episodes
1987	The Petrov Affair	Robert Menzies	TV miniseries, 2 episodes
1987	The Flying Doctors	Bob Cameron	TV series, 1 episode
1989	The Magistrate	Sampson	TV miniseries, 2 episodes
1991	Boys from the Bush	John	TV series, 1 episode
1991	Half a World Away (aka The Great Air Race)	Sir Macpherson Robertson	TV miniseries, 1 episode
1992	The Late Show	Oir Man from the Hardly Permanent	TV series, 1 episode
1993	Time Trax	Sal Mondriano	TV series, 1 episode
1995	Neighbours	Reuben White	TV series, 37 episodes
1998 / 2000	Blue Heelers	Doc Bourke / Klaus Schultz	TV series, 2 episodes
2000	Something in the Air	Gordon Flood	TV series, 1 episode
2003	After the Deluge	Brian Corstairs (uncredited)	TV miniseries

== Theatre ==
Year	Title	Role	Type
1945	Granite		Cathedral Hall, Perth
1949	The Man Who Came to Dinner	Sheridan Whiteside	Perth Repertory Theatre
1955	Mary of Scotland		Somerville Auditorium
1956	Lord Arthur Savile's Crime	Lord Arthur Savile	Perth
1961	Play of Daniel		St Mary's Cathedral, Sydney
1964	Breakfast with Julia		Phillip Street Theatre
1964	The Play of Herod	Narrator	St Mary's Cathedral, Sydney
1965	Poor Bitos		Independent Theatre, Sydney
1965	My Life with an Interval for Asprin		Independent Theatre, Sydney
1966	Three Sisters		University of NSW, Old Tote Theatre
1966	Aspects of Love		University of NSW, Old Tote Theatre
1967	Hostile Witness	Sir Peter Crossman	Tivoli Theatre, Sydney, Princess Theatre, Melbourne
1967	The Cocktail Party		Independent Theatre, Sydney
1967	Halloran's Little Boat	Terry Byrne	Independent Theatre, Sydney
1968	The Prime of Miss Jean Brodie		Independent Theatre, Sydney
1968	The Anniversary		Independent Theatre, Sydney
1968	Loot		Independent Theatre, Sydney
1968	A Delicate Balance		Independent Theatre, Sydney
1968	Wait Until Dark		Independent Theatre, Sydney
1969	Everything in the Garden		Independent Theatre, Sydney
1969	Treasure Island		University of NSW
1970	The Seagull		Scott Theatre, Adelaide
1970	Murder in the Cathedral	Thomas Becket	Independent Theatre, Sydney
1970	King Oedipus		University of NSW, Sir John Clancy Auditorium, Sydney, Canberra Theatre, Princess Theatre, Melbourne, Octagon Theatre, Perth, University of Adelaide
1971	Conduct Unbecoming	Major Alastair Wimbourne V.C.	Theatre Royal, Sydney, Comedy Theatre, Melbourne
1971-72	The Man who Shot the Albatross		Princess Theatre, Melbourne, Canberra Theatre, Elizabethan Theatre, Her Majesty's Theatre, Adelaide
1972	Under Milk Wood		Independent Theatre, Sydney
1972	Blop Goes The Weazel		University of NSW
1973	The Third Secretary		Independent Theatre, Sydney
1974	Love for Love		Sydney Opera House
1975	Candida		Marian Street Theatre
1975	The Jockey Club Stakes		Her Majesty's Theatre, Adelaide, Princess Theatre, Melbourne
1976	The Brass Hat	Major General Charles Anderson-Green	University of NSW
1976	The Shoemaker's Holiday	Earl of Lincoln	Sydney Opera House
1976	Getting On		Marian Street Theatre
1977	The Business of Good Government		Assembly Hall, Sydney
1977	Caesar and Cleopatra	Rufio	Sydney Opera House
1977	Any Fool Can	Ernest Seaton	Bondi Pavilion
1977	Some Other Town	Editor	Bondi Pavilion
1977	The Tempest	Antonio	Sydney Opera House
1979	The Bed Before Yesterday	Fred Castle	Theatre Royal, Sydney
1980-81	The Magic Pudding	Voice Over Artist	Sydney Opera House, VIC & WA Country Tour, Playhouse, Adelaide, Regal Theatre, Perth, Monash University
1983	Morning's at Seven		Marian Street Theatre
1984	Born Yesterday	Norval Hedges	Sydney Opera House
1992	The Freedom of the City		National Theatre, Melbourne
1993	M. Butterfly	M. Toulon / Man 1 / Judge	Playhouse, Melbourne, Canberra Theatre, Seymour Centre
1994	A Flea in Her Ear		Mietta's, Melbourne
1994	There's One in Every Marriage		Mietta's, Melbourne
1995	The Best of British: Rookery Nook / When We Are Married		Mietta's, Melbourne

== Radio ==
Year	Title	Role	Type
1952	Portia Faces Life	Walter Manning	3UZ Melbourne
1957	Jenny Villiers	Julian Napier	ABC Radio play
1957	Quadrille	Hubert, Marquess of Heronden	ABC Radio play
1979	Incompletions	Father / Barber	ABC Radio Sydney
1979	Lies My Father Told Me	Father	ABC Radio Sydney
1979	Laura and the Angel	Azrafel	ABC Radio Sydney
1979	Amphitryon 38	Jupiter	ABC Radio Sydney
	We'e Asking You	Compère	Radio quiz show

== Personal life ==
Condon's first marriage was to Joan Cranmer. The couple had four daughters. Condon was married to Australian actress Anne Haddy, best known for the role of matriarch Helen Daniels in Neighbours, from 1977 until her death in 1999. Condon was the stepfather of Haddy's children Jane and Tony. He acted alongside Haddy in Neighbours twice – as Douglas Blake in 1985 and again in 1995 as Reuben White after previously appearing with Haddy in several episodes of Cop Shop in 1980.

== Death ==
Condon suffered a stroke in 2013. He died at an RSL retirement home in Narrabeen, Sydney on 14 February 2014, aged 90.
