= Gaslight Music Hall =

- Genre: Variety
- Starring: Henry Gilbert; John Bluthal; June Salter; Michael Cole
- Country of origin: Australia
- Original language: English

Original release
- Network: ABC Television; TCN-9
- Release: 1959 – 1960

Gaslight Music Hall is an Australian television series which aired from 1959 to 1960. Originally aired on ABC Television, it later moved to TCN-9. Produced in Sydney, it was a live variety show spoofing Victorian music hall. Cast included Henry Gilbert, John Bluthal, June Salter, and Michael Cole. According to a section of TV Merry-Go-Round in the 27 September 1959 edition of Sydney Morning Herald, the first episode included a comedy sketch spoofing melodrama.
