= Case file =

Case file, or casefile, may refer to:

== Media ==
- Canadian Case Files, a 2005 TV series about the investigation of unsolved crimes in Canada.
- Casefile, an Australian true crime podcast that first aired in January 2016

== Music ==
- The Case Files, a 2011 compilation album by singer-songwriter Peter Case

== Novels/comics ==
- Case Files: Sam & Twitch, part of the Sam and Twitch comic series, first published in 2013

== Software ==
- L.A. Noire: The VR Case Files, a 2011 detective video game published by Rockstar Games
- Virtual Case File (VCF), an application developed by the FBI between 2000 and 2005

== See also ==
- Case (disambiguation)
- Casebook (disambiguation)
