= Rod Kinnear =

Australian television director

Rodney Scott Kinnear (11 May 1931 – 2 May 2006) was an Australian director, best known for his work in TV.

He worked at the BBC in London then returned to Australia to work for Colin Bednall at GTV-9. Kinnear started as a cameraman but soon became a director. He oversaw shows such as In Melbourne Tonight as well as the dramas filmed at the station for Shell Presents.

== Select credits ==
- Lovely to Look At (1957) (TV series)
- Tragedy in a Temporary Town (1959)
- The Big Day (1959)
- Ruth (1960)
- No Picnic Tomorrow (1960)
- Man in a Blue Vase (1960)
- The Sammy Davis Jnr Show (1960) - film of Sammy Davis Jnr in Australia - Kinnear was floor manager
- This Is Television (1960)
- The Concert (1961)
- In the Southern Cross Hotel Tonight (1962) - TV variety special - producer
- The One Day of the Year (1962)
- In Melbourne Tonight
- Rolf Harris Special (1966)
- Berioska Ballet (1966)
- ‘Superbird Action’ (1973)
- Benny Hill Down Under (1977)
- Barley Charlie (1964) (TV series)
- The World of the Seekers (1968)
- Ash Wednesday (1983) (documentary)
