= List of television plays broadcast on GTV-9 =

The following is a list of "television plays" broadcast on Australian broadcaster GTV-9 during the 1950s and 1960s.

- Emergency (1959) - TV series

== See also ==
- List of live television plays broadcast on Australian Broadcasting Corporation (1950s)
- List of television plays broadcast on ATN-7
