= Casebook (disambiguation) =

A casebook is a type of textbook used primarily by students in law schools.

Casebook may also refer to:

- Casebook PBC, an American public benefit corporation
- Casebook (TV series), an Australian documentary series
- Casebook (video game), the 2008-9 episodic video game
