= Robert Close =

Australian writer

Robert Close (15 July 1903 in Camberwell, Victoria – 17 July 1995 in Palma, Majorca) was an Australian novelist.

== Early life ==
His early life was clouded by disappointment. He hated school, and his a passion for a life at sea was blighted when he was found to have colour blindness. Tuberculosis thwarted a possible singing career. During the 1930s Depression, he worked variously as a labourer, manager, salesman, and debt collector. He was an avid reader and won prizes as a short-story writer.

== Writing career ==
In a widely publicised case, in 1946 he and "Georgian House Pty Ltd", the publisher of his 1945 novel Love Me Sailor, were prosecuted in the Supreme Court of Victoria for "obscene libel". During the first trial, the entire 90,000-word book was read to the jury by counsel for the prosecution twice: the first jury was discharged when the court was notified that the foreman of the jury had discussed the case with one of Close's friends. Close was sentenced to three months' imprisonment and a fine of £100. This was later overturned on appeal; he served 10 days in prison and was fined £150.

Close left Australia for France in 1950. His later works included Eliza Callaghan (1957), loosely based on the life of Elizabeth Callaghan, the spouse of Australian pioneer and businessman John Batman, and The Voyage Continues (1969).

== Later life ==
He returned to Australia in 1975 but after two years relocated to Majorca, where he died in 1995. His autobiography, Of Salt and Earth, was published in 1977.

== Oral History ==
Close was interviewed in 1975 by Hazel de Berg about his life and writing career. This recording can be found at the National Library of Australia.
