= Children of the Sun (book) =

Non-fiction book by Morris West

- Author: Morris West
- Language: English
- Genre: non fiction
- Publisher: 1957
- Publication place: Australia
- Media type: Print

Children of the Sun is a 1957 non-fiction book by Morris West, an investigation into the slums of post-war Naples. It was his first international success. The US title was Children of the Shadows: The True Story of the Street Urchins of Naples.

The book was a best seller in Europe and England and marked a turning point in the career of West. The Sydney Morning Herald said "with this work, West not only found his way as a writer but discovered the theme that would underpin almost all of his subsequent books — the nature and misuse of power. Of the 18 novels he was to write post-1957, 15 are on this subject."

== Background ==
West researched the book over six months in Naples, meeting Father Borrelli who worked with the street boys of Naples.

== TV Adaptation ==
In 1959 it was announced the show would be adapted for the Australian anthology series Shell Presents.

It was adapted for ITV anthology television series ITV Television Playhouse in 1961.
