= Love Me Sailor =

1945 novel

- First edition
- Author: Robert Close
- Language: English
- Publisher: Melbourne: Georgian House
- Publication date: 1945
- Publication place: Australia
- ISBN: 9780856170096

Love Me Sailor is a 1945 novel from Australian author Robert Close.

== Plot ==
A woman travels on a ship from Chile to the US.

== Background ==
Close finished writing the book in 1943.

== Adaptations ==
The book was to have been adapted into a radio play in 1946 but the production was cancelled at the last minute. It was also to be adapted into a feature film in 1977 (with Robert Bruning producing, and with a screenplay by Bruce Wishart) before that project was also abandoned.

== Obscenity Trial ==
In 1946 Close and "Georgian House Pty Ltd", the publisher of the novel were prosecuted in the Supreme Court of Victoria for "obscene libel".

During the first trial, the entire 90,000-word book was read to the jury by counsel for the prosecution twice: the first jury was discharged when the court was notified that the foreman of the jury had discussed the case with one of Close's friends. Close was sentenced to three months' imprisonment and a fine of £100. This was later overturned on appeal; he served 10 days in prison and was fined £150.
