= The House on the Corner =

Australian television series

- Genre: Drama
- Written by: Harry Howlett
- Starring: Harry Howlett; Rosemary Barker; Annette Andre
- Country of origin: Australia
- Original language: English
- No. of episodes: 4

Production
- Producer: Harry Howlett
- Running time: 10 minutes

Original release
- Network: ATN-7
- Release: 1957 – 1958

The House on the Corner is an early Australian television program which aired on the Seven Network from 1957 to 1958.

A 10-minute segment on Sydney station ATN-7, it was a drama about a family, and was produced by the Christian Television Association. Cast included Harry Howlett (who also wrote it), his wife also played a role, as well as Rosemary Barker and Annette Andre.

The series aired live, with the cast consisting mainly of amateurs drawn from church drama clubs. It is not known if any of the episodes which were filmed on kinescoped (note: kinescope recording was an early method of recording live television, used in the days before video-tape was widely available).

It was probably the first attempt at a dramatic TV series produced for Australian television, though not the first dramatic TV series produced in that country (overseas-financed children's series The Adventures of Long John Silver was the first in that regard, and pre-dated the introduction of television to Australia) Australian TV drama was relatively rare at the time.

ATN next attempted drama with the series with Autumn Affair, a soap opera, and the well-received monthly anthology series Shell Presents (sharing production with GTV-9, which alternated in producing episodes). Other 1950s-era attempts at local television drama included twice-monthly one-off plays on ABC, and the short-lived GTV-produced hospital series Emergency.

== Background ==
A condition of a commercial television station's licence was that it had to make available free pro-rate air time to the Christian religious dominations; ATN-7 had an allocated quarter hour on Sunday afternoon. The manager of ATN-7 in Sydney, Len Mauger, allowed Harry Howlett, a former actor and then executive for an association of Protestant churches, to use that quarter hour for a drama series. It was called The House on the Corner and was given the nickname The Brothel on the Bend.

It was directed by David Cahill. According to Ailsa McPherson, who worked on the show as a script assistant, "it had a script with a social message and some highly dramatic scenes, with settings created by scavenging among the stock flats and properties available at ATN. She said the actors would come into Seven's studio on Sunday afternoon and there was a camera rehearsal before transmission.

== See also ==
- List of live television plays broadcast on Australian Broadcasting Corporation (1950s)
- List of television plays broadcast on ATN-7
