= Thunder of Silence =

- Shell Presents episode
- Ad from SMH 22 Aug 1959
- Episode no.: Season 1 Episode 6
- Directed by: David Cahill
- Teleplay by: Stewart Stern
- Original air date: 22 August 1959

Guest appearance
- John Meillon

Episode chronology
← Previous "The Big Day"	Next → "Ruth"

"Thunder of Silence" is an episode of the 1959 Australian TV drama anthology Shell Presents, and the fourth made in Sydney. It was based on an American play by Stewart Stern which had been produced in the U.S. with Paul Newman and Inger Stevens. It aired live on 22 August 1959 in Sydney with a recorded version airing on 28 November 1959 in Melbourne.

It was a drama of immigrant assimilation. John Meillon played the lead. Australian TV drama was relatively rare at the time.

== Plot ==
In the American mid-west, a middle aged farmer (John Tate) and his wife (Marion Johns) give shelter to a refugee from Europe (Richard Davies) and his daughter (Marion Johns). The refugee and the farmer have very different personalities and struggle to understand each other. The situation is resolved by the return of Everett (John Meillon), the farming couple's wandering son.

== Cast ==
- John Meillon as Everett
- Richard Davies
- Marion Johns
- John Tate
- John Llewellyn
- Margo Carrigan

== Production ==
Stewart Stern based the play on the reallife experiences of farmers in Maryland who took in refugees from Europe.

Stewart Stern wrote a letter from the USA wishing good luck to everyone connected to the play, and passing on ideas from Paul Newman as to how the role of Everett (the part he played on US TV) should be performed. The letter was read out to the cast the night before the show was recorded. Producer Brett Porter said, "'these words from the author seemed to clarify everyone's conception of the play itself, and they went on to give what I firmly believe is the best production yet in the series."

The play was filmed at ATN-7's studios in Epping. A tape recording was sent to Stern in the US.

Porter said, "I hope that showing this film, to people like Stern and Newman will prove to people in America that we have, in Australia, actors equal to the best in the world."

Margot Carrigan was in Take a Chance on ATN.

== Reception ==
The TV critic from the Sydney Morning Herald thought the play treated the theme "in the terms of a paperbacked women's novelette" with "sticky flood of sentimentality" and "naive philosophising" but thought Million "did very well to give a tense of life and vitality to a character whose motivation was obscure and whose dialogue, at times, was impossibly trite. Most of the time, his part sounded as though it had been written for James Dean by Ernest Hemingway—with neither of them at their best... David Cahill's direction was fluent and uncluttered."

The TV critic for The Age praised the production's "sound musical judgement" and opening documentary footage of refugees being vetted though felt Meillon "was much too preoccupied wrestling with the American accent" and although felt the play "was good entertainment" wondered why it was not adapted to be set in Australia.

Meillon's performance led to his casting in A Tongue of Silver.

== See also ==
- List of television plays broadcast on ATN-7
