= Other People's Houses =

- Shell Presents episode
- Ad from SMH 1 May 1959
- Episode no.: Season 1 Episode 2
- Directed by: David Cahill
- Teleplay by: Tad Mosel
- Original air date: 2 May 1959
- Running time: 60 mins

Guest appearance
- Diana Perryman

Episode chronology
← Previous "Johnny Belinda"	Next → "Tragedy in a Temporary Town"

"Other People's Houses" is the second episode of the 1959 Australian television drama anthology Shell Presents. It was based on a play by Tad Mosel and starred Diana Perryman and was directed by David Cahill. It aired on 2 May 1959 in Sydney and on 3 October 1959 in Melbourne.

The script had previously been filmed in the U.S. for Goodyear Playhouse, with Rod Steiger and Eileen Heckart.

== Plot ==
An old man (Lou Vernon) lives with his married daughter and her husband and they do not like him. His eldest daughter, Inez, moves in with them, and tries to save her father from an old person's home.

== Cast ==
- Lou Vernon as the old man
- Diana Perryman as Inez, the eldest daughter
- Coralie Neville as the married daughter
- Deryck Barnes her husband Ralph
- Fred Powell as a policeman

== Production ==
ATN-7 originally announced that the second episode of Shell Presents would be an adaptation of Children of the Sun by Morris West but that was not made. In April 1959 it was announced the second episode would be Other People's Hoses.

Rehearsals began in April 1959. It was Carolie Neville's television debut.

The production was shot at ATN 7's studio in Epping, Sydney. The complete interior of a "typical American middle class home" was built and the action was shot with three characters. Producer Brett Porter and director David Cahill spent a week going through the script to plan the presentation and the shooting pattern. There were three weeks of rehearsals and two hours of dress rehearsals. There were two rehearsals the day of the performance.

The design of the house was done in the American style. Vernon Best, operations manager for ATN, said that because the play was an intimate family drama, its setting had to be absolutely accurate. "We cannot have one false note," he said. "We have to take special care with furnishings."

Coralie Neville, one of the cast, said: "It's a brilliant play, and it's so much like life itself that we won't be able to act the people in it. We will have to be the people."

== Reception ==
A spokesman for ATN Channel 7 said the phoned lines were "choked with congratulatory calls" from "all parts of Sydney" immediately after production finished.

The television critic for the Sydney Morning Herald said the "director and cast... did not fully exploit the emotional possibilities of the ugly little domestic situation examined by the author in slick, oversimple terms. Technically fluent and firm in accents, but always rather cheap in set decoration, the production ran smoothly through its story."

== See also ==
- List of television plays broadcast on ATN-7
