= They Were Big, They Were Blue, They Were Beautiful =

- Shell Presents episode
- Ad in SMH 27 Jun 1959
- Episode no.: Season 1 Episode 4
- Directed by: David Cahill
- Teleplay by: Ross Napier
- Original air date: 27 June 1959
- Running time: 60 mins

Episode chronology
← Previous "Tragedy in a Temporary Town"	Next → "The Big Day"

"They Were Big, They Were Blue, They Were Beautiful" is an Australian television movie, or rather a live television play, which aired live on 27 June 1959 in Sydney, and on 8 August 1959 in Melbourne. It aired as part of Shell Presents, a monthly presentation of standalone productions which aired from 1959 to 1960 on ATN-7 in Sydney and GTV-9 in Melbourne.

In contrast with the first three episodes of Shell Presents, which were tragedies, this was a comedy. It was also the first based on an original Australian script.

The production was broadcast live in Sydney and later shown in Melbourne via a video-tape recording. Then Governor General William Slim was present at the live broadcast.

== Plot ==
Set in Sydney, two men (Stewart Ginn and Kevin Brennan), after being released from prison, unintentionally become involved in a baby kidnapping plot.

== Cast ==
- Stewart Ginn
- Kevin Brennan
- June Salter
- Fifi Banvard as the landlady of the house
- Diana Davidson
- Gordon Glenwright

== Production ==
The original script, by Ross Napier, won third prize of £400 in the £3,000 Shell Australian TV drama competition.

First prize when to a play about Victoria's "Black Friday" on 13 January 1939, "The Day Called Black," by Robin Cornfield. Second prize went to "The Bed by the Window" about a hospital murder by Paul Chidlow. The first prize for adaptations went to Charles Phillips for an adaptation of the Henry Lawson story "Send Around the Hat." Second prize went to Catherine Hamilton for an adaptation of the Emlyn Williams play, The Druid's Rest. James Downing won third prize for adapting the Victorien Sardou story, "The Black Pearl." The judges, Harry Dearth, Royston Morley, and John McCallum, said the standard of entries was disappointingly low.

Napier rewrote the play after submitting it for the prize. He called it "a light drama with a humorous element." Brett Porter producer of Shell Presents said "So far we have concentrated on topline American plays. These have proved very successful... But we need a proportion of good Australian plays if we are really going to produce first-rate TV drama for Australian audiences. We are making every effort to assist local writers and to introduce them to the particular problem of writing plays for TV."

It was the first TV appearance for Stewart Ginn and Fifi Banvard. Kevin Brennan had impressed in Johnny Belinda.

Australian's governor general, Sir William Slim visited the set and watched dress rehearsals.

The budget of the show was £3,070.

== Reception ==
The TV critic for the Sydney Morning Herald wrote that the "chief fault" of the play was it "stretched half an hour's worth of material over an hour-long format" and "the direct, waist-high frontal attack of director David Cahill's cameras. A little more imagination in the choice of angles and distance would have considerably reduced this monotony of observation" however it praised the touches and thought "the actors served... [the writer] well.

The Sunday Sydney Morning Herald said the production "left me a shade disappointed. Author Ross Napier proved to be a skilled and professional manipulator of words and dialogue but he developed one joke... far too long."

The Woman's Weekly critic called it "embarrassingly bad to watch".

The Age said "there was not much to enthuse about" calling the play "feeble, thin and unfunny."

In 1992 June Salter said it was the worst play or show she had ever been in.

== See also ==
- List of television plays broadcast on ATN-7
