= Man in a Blue Vase =

- Shell Presents episode
- SMH ad 5 Mar 1960
- Episode no.: Season 1 Episode 13
- Directed by: Rod Kinnear
- Teleplay by: Richard Benyon
- Original air date: 5 March 1960
- Running time: 60 mins

Episode chronology
← Previous "Reflections in Dark Glasses"	Next → —

"Man in a Blue Vase" is an Australian television one-off comedy presentation which aired in 1960. It was part of Shell Presents, which consisted of monthly presentations of standalone television dramas and comedies. It aired on 19 March 1960 on GTV-9 in Melbourne and on 5 March 1960 on ATN-7 in Sydney, as this was prior to the creation of the Seven Network and Nine Network.

A set of pictures from the show appear in a 1960 edition of The Age

Unlike most of the Shell Presents presentations, it wasn't aired live. Although produced in Melbourne, it aired in Sydney first.

== Plot ==
Set in a Polish-Jewish household in Melbourne. Aaron tries to prove his individuality by taking money from his wife Shirley's blue vase. Sister in law Esther tells Shirley that marriage is a state of war and she needs to take a stand. Aaron goes drinking and asks his brother in law Herman why he lets Esther bully him. Shirley gets advice from her mother in law, Reba.

== Cast ==
- Alan Hopgood as Aaron
- Coralie Neville as Shirley
- Sue Saffir as Esther
- John Bluthal as Herman
- Rachel Holzer as Reba
- Edward Howell as Uncle Ben
- Don Crosby as a barman
- Joe Hudson as Taxi Driver

== Production ==
The script was written by Richard Benyon (1925–99), author of the play The Shifting Heart.

== Reception ==
The TV critic from the Sydney Morning Herald said the play was "refreshing for its observation that there don't have to be lurid triangles or melodramatic boozing or homesacrificing career obsessions to put marriages on the rocks" but still lacks something of the warmth by which a Chayefsky allows his commonplace characters to arouse deeply compassionate interest in their everyday conflict, collaboration and compromise. Beynon's people... are carefully observed and their talk runs pretty naturally, but some want of rich detail in the writing and among... [the]players prevented them from making a compelling appeal."

The Age wrote that "the story wasn't 'big' enough to carry an hour of television. Otherwise the drama is quite good. The cast performed well."

== Radio Adaptation ==
The play was adapted for radio in 1960.

There was another adaptation in 1963. The cast: Nigel Lambert (Aaron), Mark Kelly (Herman), Miriam Karlin (Reba), Patricia Gallimore (Shirley), Amber Cecil (Esther), John Cazabon (Uncle Ben), Brian Harrison (Barman), and Brian Harrison (Taxi driver).

== See also ==
- List of television plays broadcast on ATN-7
