= Tragedy in a Temporary Town (Shell Presents) =

- Shell Presents episode
- Ad from SMH 25 May 1959
- Episode no.: Season 1 Episode 3
- Directed by: Rod Kinnear
- Teleplay by: Reginald Rose
- Original air date: May 16, 1959

Guest appearance
- Michael Pate

Episode chronology
← Previous "Other People's Houses"	Next → "They Were Big, They Were Blue, They Were Beautiful"

"Tragedy In A Temporary Town" is a 1959 episode of the Australian anthology drama show Shell Presents starring Michael Pate. It was filmed "live" in Melbourne, then recorded and broadcast in Sydney. It was the third episode of Shell Presents and the first shot in Melbourne. It aired live on 16 May 1959 in Melbourne with a taped version airing on 30 May 1959 in Sydney.

The script had originally been filmed under the same title on The Alcoa Hour in the U.S. in 1956.

== Plot ==
In a small town, a group of migrant workers are employed at an aircraft factory and live in a trailer park. When a girl claims she has been attacked, a group of men, led by Frank Doran, attempt to find out who is possible. They seize a Mexican boy, Raphael Infante, and threaten to lynch him. A tolerant man called Alec Beggs attempts to stop them.

== Cast ==
- Michael Pate as Alec Beggs
- George Fairfax as Frank Doran
- Paul Karo as Raphael Infante
- Marjorie Archibald as Mrs. Fisher
- Carol Armstrong as Dotty Fisher
- Susan Armstrong as Inez Infanti
- John Cousins as Repulski
- Marcel Cugola as Julio Infante, Raphael's father
- Earl Francis as Mickey Doran
- John Garry as Muller
- Frank Gatliff as Matt Fisher, the parent of the teenage girl
- Tim Goodlett as Anderson
- Alan Hopgood as McCarthy
- Edward Howell as Harry Phillips
- Bettine Kauffmann as Dolores Infante

== Production ==
The production starred Australian Michael Pate who was based in Hollywood from 1950 until the late 1960s. He made the film on a temporary return visit to Australia, arriving in Melbourne in late April to begin rehearsals.

The play was shot in Melbourne.

== Reception ==
The TV critic for The Age called it "promising" with an "outstanding performance" from George Fairfax.

The TV critic for the Woman's Weekly called the production "a tragedy all right... the play was notably unrealistic, its star, Michael Pate, disappointing... a brave and expensive experiment for a commercial channel... [but] miserable viewing."

The TV critic for the Sydney Morning Herald said it "did not make its potential impact because of uninventive direction and, with the tension factor suffering accordingly, some lack of subtlety in the characterisations."

== See also ==
- The 1956 original presentation of Tragedy in a Temporary Town.
- List of television plays broadcast on ATN-7
