= Pardon Miss Westcott =

- Shell Presents episode
- Advertisement in The Age, 17 Dec 1959
- Episode no.: Season 1 Episode 10
- Directed by: David Cahill
- Teleplay by: Peter Benjamin; Alan Burke
- Original air date: 12 December 1959
- Running time: 75 mins

Guest appearances
- Wendy Blacklock; Queenie Ashton

Episode chronology
← Previous "Rope"	Next → "No Picnic Tomorrow"

"Pardon Miss Westcott!" is a 1959 Australian television play by the Seven Network as part of drama anthology series Shell Presents. It was a musical set in colonial Australia and was broadcast live. It was Australia's first commissioned for television musical comedy. "Pardon Miss Westcott" aired on 12 December 1959 in Sydney and on 19 December 1959 in Melbourne.

It ran for 75 minutes and featured eight new songs and a cast of nineteen.

== Plot ==
It is 1809 and Britain sends its convicts to the penal colony of New South Wales. On a convict ship travelling to Sydney, the convicts, notably three men, Mansfield, Harbutt, and Snark, sing "He-ho, you'll never go back".

Elizabeth Westcott is being transported after being given a five year sentence for killing a pig and serving it to a pompous magistrate at her father's inn. On the boat over she meets Richard Soames, an army officer being transferred to the NSW Corps. Elizabeth befriends Mansfield, Harbutt, and Snark after she refuses to report them for theft; they sing "Send for Me" together.

The ship arrives in Sydney. Richard meets the new, temporary Governor, Colonel Patterson, who has taken over from Governor Bligh (the Rum Rebellion has just taken place). Paterson complains about the lack of decent servants and Richard recommends Elizabeth but Paterson is reluctant to employ a former convict.

Elizabeth arrives to track down Richard and impresses Paterson, who offers her the job of managing Government House. She persuades Richard to let Mansfield, Harbutt, and Snark join her as servants. Richard sings "You Walk By" to Elizabeth.

Elizabeth runs the house with great success but this causes the Governor's wife, Lydia, to become jealous and demand the convict leave. Paterson decides to grant Elizabeth a ticket of leave and loans her five pounds to set up an inn. Elizabeth sings "I'm on My Way".

Elizabeth runs the inn, called the Silver Bottle, along with a servant girl, Mog. It is popular but they have trouble with the local soldiers. She decides to gate crash a party held by Paterson and his wife, in order to talk to the Governor. At the party, Lydia sings a song to her guests, "Our Own Bare Hands".

Elizabeth arrives to make an appeal to Paterson, but upsets Lydia. Richard arrives at the party and dances with Elizabeth; he sings her a song, "Sometimes".

At the Silver Bottle, the customers, including Mansfield, Harbutt, and Snark, sing and dance a number, "The Grog Song". The convicts mock Lydia, when Paterson arrives and overhears. He is upset and sends the convicts home. Paterson also tells Elizabeth she and Richard must not see each other, as she would be bad for his career. She briefly reprises "Send for Me".

Paterson tells Richard to not see Elizabeth and he reluctantly agrees. Mansfield, Harbutt, and Snark escape, taking Paterson's rabbits. Sent to find the convicts, Paterson sneaks out to see Elizabeth and they sing a song, "So Much More". Paterson catches the two of them together and demands Richard's resignation; he also orders Paterson to spend the night in prison with the three recaptured convicts.

In prison, Mansfield, Harbutt, and Snark sing "The Whole Shebang", watched by Richard. The convicts escape, during which Richard is knocked out. The convicts deposit Richard and Elizabeth's inn. When Richard wakes up he insists they go back to prison. He and Elizabeth sing "The Argument" along with Mansfield, Harbutt and Snark. The convicts eventually agree to return to their cell.

Lydia is convinced that Elizabeth and her husband are having an affair. The convicts have broken out of prison again. Elizabeth insists she loves Richard. Elizabeth and Richard sing a love duet, "You Walked By".

The convicts arrive, having recaptured Paterson's rabbits. Paterson tells Richard that the NSW Corps is being disbanded, Paterson is going home and Richard is out of the army. Elizabeth has to serve out the remaining four years of her sentence. Mansfield, Harbutt, and Snark are given an extra five years of service, but are assigned to Richard as servants. Mog, the convicts, Elizabeth and Richard sing a final song.

== Cast ==
- Wendy Blacklock as Elizabeth Westcott
- Michael Cole as Lt Richard Soames
- Nigel Lovell as Colonel Patterson, the acting Governor of NSW
- Queenie Ashton as Lydia Patterson
- Chris Christensen as Mansfield
- Nat Levison as Snark
- Michael Walshe as Harbutt
- Joy Hill as Mog McGuire
- Don Crosby as corporal
- Frank Sheldon as Ensign Randall
- Frank Salter as soldier/guard
- Bruce Harris as sentry
- Don McIntyre as Lt Collins
- Joy Hill, Frank Sheldon, Margaret Abbie, Frank Salter, Paul Munro, Bruce Harris, Dawn Bowden, Don McIntyre, Judy Maxwell, Kevin Fruend, Chris George as dancers

== Production ==
The film was commissioned and broadcast live by the Seven Network's ATN-7 Sydney studio's from the writers of the musical Lola Montez, which had enjoyed a successful run on stage. The brief was to create a family musical for Christmas. The budget was £5,000

The book was by Alan Burke and Peter Benjamin, Benjamin also wrote the lyrics and the music was by Peter Stannard. Burke appeared "by courtesy of the ABC" who were employing him as a director.

The music was conducted by Tommy Tycho, leading a full ATN Studio Orchestra (rather than show band). Kevin Cameron designed the sets, Bill Robinson prepared wardrobe and Vernon Best was operations manager. Ken Shadie supervised audio. Betty Pounder was borrowed from J.C. Williamsons to direct the choreography.

Michael Cole had been fired from Lola Montez and was hired by the writers for this to make it up to him.

According to Ailsa McPherson, who worked on the show as a script assistant, during the live broadcast the actor who played Colonel Patterson accidentally omitted over a page of dialogue in an earlier scene. The other actors continued because it was live, but it meant later plot points would be confusing. After the show went to air, they re-shot the scene and re-inserted it into the tape and kine.

== Songs ==
- Overture (orchestra)
- "He-ho, you'll never go back" - sung by male chorus of convicts at beginning
- "Send for Me" - sung by Wendy Blacklock
- "I'm On My Way" - sung by Wendy Blacklock
- "Bells Suddenly Ringing" - love song sung by Michael Cole
- "The Grog Song" - sung by taverners at The Silver Bottle
- "How Could I See?" - sung by Blacklock and Cole
- "The Whole Shebang" - sung by three convicts (Chris Christensen, Nat Levinson, Michael Walsh)
- "You Walked By" - sung by Blacklock and Cole
- "So Much More"
- "Our Own Bare Hands"
- "The Argument"
- "Sometimes"
- Finale

== Reception ==
The Beacon Research Company estimated that 250,000 adults and 10,000 children watched the broadcast. More than 100 people rang in to congratulate on the broadcast on the night it aired.

=== Critical ===
The critic from the Sydney Morning Herald wrote the musical "had an entertaining and beguilingly tuneful premiere in a smoothly organised live production" despite "the lack of colour and space in which create spectacle and the effects which properly, and uniquely-belong to the stage." However:

Nine numbers in a 75-minute show is pretty fair value, and the... tunes and lyrics were fluent, neatly turned and literate. Equally important. they arose naturally from the situations arranged by the... book, and always took the story-line, and characterisation, a step further. And at least one song, "Bells Suddenly Ring" is a possible hit tune. Moreover, the show proved that for those who are willing to use their imagination, there is plenty of theatrical material in our early history... Michael Cole acted and sang very attractively indeed: Wendy Blacklock brought the proper strength of character... but was not entirely at ease with her songs. Nigel Lovell.. was engaging and sympathetic, and Queenie Ashton, his snooty hypochondriac wife, was nicely acid. Chris Christiansen, Nat Levispn and Michael Walshe made a usefully funny convict trio, and Joy Hill danced with considerable verve and enthusiasm.

Reviewing it years later Filmink called it "charming... full of life and energy, with enjoyable tunes and dance numbers; the cast completely commits, particularly the supporting players, the production values are impressive, and the script even makes vague political points (about how laws should be just, and you shouldn't keep stealing things). It's very well directed... Admittedly, the script feels as though it could have done with another draft just to tighten the subplots, but there is some lovely comedy, bright tunes, as well as thrilling high-octane dance numbers (with spectacular high kicks courtesy of ballerina Joy Hill).

== Cast Album ==
A studio cast album, with different performers from the television version (apart from Queenie Ashton), was released in December 1960.

=== Songs on 1960 Cast Album ===
1. "Overture" (Orchestra)
2. "Heigh Ho, You'll Never Go Back" (male chorus)
3. "Send For Me" (Elizabeth, Mansfield, Harbutt, and Snark)
4. "You Walk By" (Richard)
5. "The Whole Shebang" (Mansfield, Harbutt, and Snark)
6. "I'm On My Way" (Elizabeth)
7. "Grog Song" (chorus)
8. "So Much More" (Elizabeth and Richard)
9. "Our Own Bare Hands" (Lydia)
10. "The Argument" (Elizabeth, Richard, Mansfield, Harbutt, and Snark)
11. "Sometimes" (Richard)
12. "Finale" (Elizabeth, Richard, and Chorus)

== Repeat ==
The show was repeated on Channel 7 in November 1960.

The Bulletin called it "bright and tuneful".

The Sydney Morning Herald said "it came through even better on the second run than the first."

== See also ==
- List of television plays broadcast on ATN-7
