= The Big Day (Shell Presents) =

- Shell Presents episode
- SMH ad 25 Jul 1959
- Episode no.: Season 1 Episode 5
- Directed by: Rod Kinnear
- Teleplay by: John Ford
- Original air date: 11 July 1959
- Running time: 60 mins

Episode chronology
← Previous "They Were Big, They Were Blue, They Were Beautiful"	Next → "Thunder of Silence"

"The Big Day" is an Australian television film, or rather a live television play, which aired in 1959. The fifth episode of the Shell Presents presentations of standalone television dramas, it originally aired 11 July 1959 on Melbourne station GTV-9, a video-tape was made of the broadcast and shown on Sydney station ATN-7 on 25 July 1959 (this was prior to the formation of the Nine Network and Seven Network).

It was the first hour of drama made for commercial Australian TV which was written and produced by an Australian with an all Australian cast. It was called "a gentle study of an ordinary life."

Shell Presents was a monthly series presenting locally produced television dramas and comedies. Most of these were adaptations of overseas dramas such as Johnny Belinda and One Bright Day, but a few were locally-written.

Filmink magazine called this "one of those naturalistic slice of life dramas that they liked to do on TV in the late ‘50s off the back of the success of Paddy Chayefsky’s TV writing."

Archival status of the program is unknown.

== Plot ==
The last day at work of Hector Skeats, a costing clerk in a city office, who is retiring after many years. He is a father of two, a girl in her early twenties and a boy in his late teens. When his retirement is officially recognised by his boss, his son is arrested for stealing a car.

== Cast ==
- Edward Howell as Horace Skeats
- Elizabeth Wing as Mrs Skeats
- Don Battye as his son
- Roslyn De Winter as their daughter
- Syd Conabere as Clarrie
- Tony Brown
- Dudley Burton
- John Morgan
- Frank Rich
- Lloyd Cunningham

== Production ==
The play was written by John Ford, a Sydney journalist. At the time of writing he worked in public relations at Qantas.

It was the second original Australian episode of Shell Presents, following They Were Big, They Were Blue, They Were Beautiful. That play had come third in a Shell-sponsored competition for new Australian TV plays. Ford wrote "The Big Day" for this competition but was unable to submit it in time. However it was picked up for production. His writing style was compared with Paddy Chayefsky but Ford said, "I wasn't conscious of writing in any particular style when I started the play. All I have tried to do is portray a day in the life of an extremely ordinary little bloke, the kind of person who lives a dull existence from one week to the next." It involved a cast of ten.

== Reception ==
When the play screened, viewers called with their congratulations, jamming the switchboard for half an hour.

The TV critic for The Age said Howell's casting "was the vital factor in making the drama the best yet presented in commercial series."

The TV critic for the Woman's Weekly called it "beautifully done, well acted and produced... an hour of very real and moving entertainment. All the Australians in it were just ordinary people, not the usual well-known theatrical Australian types but the kind of people you'd find any- where in the world."

The critic for the Sydney Morning Herald thought the play demonstrated "television 's ability to make dramatic entertainment of undramatic people and events... except for about 45 seconds of gross overstatement in the middle of the play, and a sentimental twist at the end which weakens its main argument" the main conflict was "cleverly conducted and neatly contrived". He thought Kinnear's "direction was generally efficient, and, in one or two scenes and the opening documentary titles, more imaginative than in some previous unlively live productions."

Valda Marshall of the same paper said the play was "exactly right for the living room atmosphere of TV viewing" and praised the direction and acting. Marshall liked the play so much that two years later she said it "has remained pretty much par for the course for Australian TV drama ever since".

Ford later sold the play to Italian and British TV.

== See also ==
- Reflections in Dark Glasses - Shell Presents episode
- They Were Big, They Were Blue, They Were Beautiful - Shell Presents episode
- List of television plays broadcast on ATN-7
