= List of television plays broadcast on ATN-7 =

The following is a list of television plays broadcast on Australian broadcaster ATN-7 during the 1950s and 1960s.

- The House on the Corner (1957) - TV series
- Autumn Affair (1958) - TV series
- The Big Day - episode of Shell Presents
- No Picnic Tomorrow - episode of Shell Presents
- Man in a Blue Vase - episode of Shell Presents
- Johnny Belinda (1959) - episode of Shell Presents
- Children of the Sun (1959) - episode of Shell Presents
- Other People's Houses (1959) - episode of Shell Presents
- A Tongue of Silver (1959) - episode of Shell Presents
- Pardon Miss Westcott (1959) - episode of Shell Presents
- Big Blue and Beautiful (1960) - episode of Shell Presents
- Reflections in Dark Glasses (1960) - episode of Shell Presents
- Thunder of Silence (1960) - episode of Shell Presents
- Tragedy in a Temporary Town (1960) - episode of Shell Presents
- Shadow of a Pale Horse (1960) (TV movie)
- The Grey Nurse Said Nothing (1960) (TV movie)
- Thunder of Sycamore Street (1960) (TV movie)
- The Concert (1961) (TV movie)
- The Story of Peter Grey (1961) TV series
- You Can't See Round Corners (1967) (TV series)

== See also ==
- List of live television plays broadcast on Australian Broadcasting Corporation (1950s)
- List of television plays broadcast on GTV-9
