= Emergency (1959 TV series) =

Australian television series

- Genre: Drama
- Directed by: Denzil Howson
- Starring: Brian James; Syd Conabere; Judith Godden; Natalie Raine
- Country of origin: Australia
- Original language: English
- No. of seasons: 1
- No. of episodes: 16

Production
- Executive producer: Roland Strong
- Production locations: Melbourne, Victoria
- Running time: 30 minutes
- Production company: GTV-9

Original release
- Network: Nine Network
- Release: 16 February – 1 June 1959

Emergency is an Australian television series produced by Nine Network Melbourne station GTV-9 in 1959.

== Synopsis ==
The series was set in the busy casualty department of a major fictional Melbourne hospital, and is notable for being one of the first-ever dramas shown on Australian television.

== Cast ==
Made by Melbourne's GTV-9 in co-operation with the Royal Melbourne Hospital, and based on Britain's Emergency Ward 10, Emergency starred Brian James as Dr. Geoffrey Thompson, Syd Conabere as orderly George Rogers, and Judith Godden as Nurse Jill Adamson. Moira Carleton also featured as Matron Evans.

=== Cast roles after series ===
Following the series demise, the actors went onto other roles Brian James went on to lead roles in the ABC serial Stormy Petrel in 1960, and ATN-7's period drama Jonah in 1962, later appearing as George Tippit in the drama serial Skyways (1979–81), before becoming best known for his role in cult series Prisoner

Moira Carleton appeared in guest roles in most of the Australian TV dramas on the 1960s and 1970s, with a permanent role as Olive Turner on Bellbird, whilst Syd Conabere starred in serial Sons and Daughters.

== Production ==
The series was produced primarily in the GTV-9 studio, with brief (usually pre-credit) exterior sequences shot on 35mm film by newsreel cameramen. The episodes were not broadcast live, but were kinescoped to meet programming requirements, and facilitate later screening in Sydney.

The series' premise was simple: a basic dramatic exploration of cases passing through the Casualty ward. Scripts were written by GTV staffers Roland Strong (series producer) and Denzil Howson (series director) under pseudonyms.

Sponsorship came from British Petroleum, and a contract was signed for 52 half-hour episodes. The series debuted on GTV-9 on 16 February 1959, and on Sydney's ATN-7 a week later. Critics initially appeared fairly neutral, however a highly negative article on the series in a Sydney newspaper caused BP to withdraw sponsorship 16 weeks into the series run. Faced with having to carry the production expenses alone, GTV-9 discontinued production, with the final episode airing in Melbourne on 1 June 1959.

Patricia Kennedy called it "exhausting but exciting."

== Reception ==
The Australian Women's Weekly called it "shudderingly bad."

== See also ==
- Autumn Affair - An earlier attempt at Australian television drama in 1958
- Shell Presents - A series of one-off plays produced for Australian television in 1959-1960
- The House on the Corner
