= A Tongue of Silver =

- Shell Presents episode
- The Age 19 Feb 1960
- Episode no.: Season 1 Episode 8
- Directed by: David Cahill
- Teleplay by: Michael Dyne
- Original air date: 17 October 1959
- Running time: 60 mins

Guest appearance
- John Meillon

Episode chronology
← Previous "Ruth"	Next → "Rope"

"A Tongue of Silver" is an episode of the 1959 Australian television drama anthology Shell Presents. Australian television drama was relatively rare at the time. It starred John Meillon, who had been in Thunder of Silence in the same series.

It aired on 17 October 1959 in Sydney, and on 20 February 1960 in Melbourne. It was the first play from Shell Presents to be telecast in Western Australia, and was broadcast there in 17 October 1959.

It was repeated on 22 May 1960.

== Plot ==
A stranger arrives in an Irish village during a thunderstorm. They are convinced he is an emissary from Heaven. He sets about selling them plots in Heaven, saying he has been sent by St Columba, patron saint of the village, who is annoyed the villagers have allowed the church to fall into disrepair, and says money from the sale of plots of land will go towards repair the church.

== Cast ==
- Minnie Love as Lady Malmoney
- Mary Mackay as Mss Prym
- Tom Farley as Farmer Finney
- Gwen Plumb as Mrs Mappin
- Wynne Nelson as Miss Miller
- Nellie Lampore as Mother Sixpence
- John Meillon as Traveller
- Alistair Duncan as Willy Figg
- Lyn Falson as fiddler
- Jerry Duggan a constable

== Production ==
The play had been filmed in the US in 1957 as Matinee Theatre, with Robert Horton as the Traveller. It would be filmed again in 1960 as an episode of Startime with Robert Goulet as the Traveller.

John Meillon was cast in the lead on the basis of his performance in Thunder of Silence.

Stanley Kramer, who directed Meillon in On the Beach, called him "a brilliant young actor, and he could take his place in any moving-picture market of the world".

Filmink thought ATN-7 might have selected the play because "they wanted to tell an 'Irish story', but didn't wish to tackle anything political (which ruled out, say, adaptions of Sean O’Casey and Brendan Behan), and preferred using a road-tested script that had already been filmed overseas versus taking the risk of commissioning something new from an Australian writer with Irish heritage... They may also have been influenced by the fact that A Tongue of Silver would provide a terrific star part for John Meillon."

It was the only television performance of Wynne Nelson. Fred "Cul" Cullen did the sets.

== Reception ==
The television critic for the Sydney Morning Herald called it "a piece of folksy whimsy" which was overlong and suffered from clichés and poor accents. He said Meillon "was very effective in a quiet and craftsmanlike way; but the vigour that would have provided the proper foil for his well-judged performance was not vitally forthcoming from the actors around him. David Cahill's direction, within the limits set by the play itself, was fine and inventive, and there was some very precise and imaginative marrying of image and sound. But if we are going to have Irish plays, why not something like Juno and the Paycock or Shadow of a Gunman? There is not much merit in producing a poor play just because it is relatively new."

The Sunday Sydney Morning Herald called it "a most creditable job for all concerned."

The critic for the Woman's Weekly said the play "nearly sent me round the bend" in which a "wonderful idea... was almost completely lost in a welter of phony Irish accents" and Meillon "was sadly miscast."

The Age said "every time Meillon opened his mouth I could ses only that beautifully starched shirt. A pity."

A 1967 review of Australian television drama said that this and Johnny Belinda were among the most successful of early Australian TV plays.

Filmink said "Meillon is perfectly cast as a smooth-talking con man, full of blarney and charm; he even sings several times, twice while playing the harp, which is cool. It’s also fun to see Gwen Plumb as a barmaid, Minnie Love as a particularly naive rich old lady, and Gerry Duggan... if you don’t like Irish whimsy, then A Tongue of Silver is unlikely to change your mind, but if you do, you’ll have good time watching it."

== See also ==
- List of television plays broadcast on ATN-7
