= Mother's Day (play) =

1940 Australian play by Leslie Rees

Mother's Day is a 1940 Australian play by Leslie Rees. It received a number of amateur productions.

Reviewing a production Wireless Weekly called it "an unpretentious and pleasant enough one-act play. His juvenile characters are well drawn, but the denouement is easily anticipated."

The play was published in a 1944 collection Six Australian One Act Plays.

It was one of the plays recommended for production in 1940 by the Playwrights' Advisory Board.
