= Casebook (video game) =

Episodic point-and-click video game

- Developer: Areo Cinematic Games
- Publisher: Big Fish Games
- Engine: Areograph
- Platform: Microsoft Windows
- Release: Episode 1: December 2008; Episode 2: March 2009; Episode 3: November 2009; Episode 0: July 6, 2010; Retail version: October 1, 2010
- Genres: Interactive movie, Point-and-click adventure
- Mode: Single-player

Casebook is an episodic interactive movie point-and-click adventure game developed by New Zealand studio Areo Cinematic Games and published by Big Fish Games.

== Gameplay ==
The game is played from the perspective of a crime scene investigator tasked with solving a series of murders. The player is accompanied by a detective partner named James Burton. Players search for clues using a point-and-click system to explore various locations. Players are then graded on how well they searched and how many "hints" they used to uncover the evidence. Environments are rendered primarily using Full motion video technology. Mini-games serve to break up the FMV segments.

== Plot ==
The plot is broken up into four episodes. Episode 0 acts as a demo for the game, with the player being asked to assist Detective Burton in locating his uncle's ashes. Episode 1 is entitled "Kidnapped" and tasks the player with investigating the kidnapping of the Bichermann kids. Episode 2 is entitled "The Watcher" and concerns a purported suicide attempt by a young man in an apartment building. Episode 3 is entitled "Snake in the Grass" and concerns an assortment of cases occurring within a garden.

== Reception ==
Each episode of casebook received moderately positive reviews, with reviewers praising the game's revival of FMV technology while criticizing the game's mini-games as tedious and not interesting.
