= David Cahill =

Australian actor, writer-producer-director & TV pioneer

- Born: 1921; Sydney, New South Wales, Australia
- Died: August 2008 (aged 86–87); Sydney, New South Wales, Australia
- Occupations: Actor; writer; producer; director

David Cahill (1921 – August 2008) was an Australian actor, screenwriter-producer, playwright and director, he had early started his career writing for stage productions and also served as a stage director, but he was most notable for his work directing for television from its introduction in 1956 through to late 1970s.

It has been claimed he was one of the best directors working in early Australian TV. His pioneering credits at Seven Network ATN7 included first religious TV series, featuring a teenaged Annette Andre, and first long-running dramatic serial starring Muriel Steinbeck.

He was also an actor and writer, starting in theatre in the early 1940s and in the mid-1950s spent some time in England. before returning to Sydney in the 60s, Cahill broke taboos and pushed censorship limits as the director of the satirical sketch comedy The Mavis Bramston Show and the angry young men serial You Can't See 'Round Corners for the Seven Network. Toward the end of his directing career, Cahill helmed the majority of ABC's early colour soap opera serial Certain Women.

== Personal life ==
He was the father of Sally Cahill, the Australian actress appearing in the television series Prisoner, whom he directed in her teenage debut (Halfway to Nowhere) and a number of serial performances.

== Select credits ==
- The House on the Corner (1957–58) (Australian TV's first religious series)
- Autumn Affair (1958) (early TV soap opera series, probably first in Australia)
- Johnny Belinda (1959)
- Other People's Houses (1959) (TV movie)
- A Tongue of Silver (1959) (TV movie)
- Pardon Miss Westcott (1959) (original TV movie musical)
- Big Blue and Beautiful (1960) (TV movie)
- Reflections in Dark Glasses (1960) (TV movie)
- Shadow of a Pale Horse (1960) (TV movie)
- The Grey Nurse Said Nothing (1960) (TV movie)
- Thunder of Sycamore Street (1960) (TV movie)
- Jonah (1962) (TV series)
- Pick a Box (1963) (TV game show)
- Tribunal (1963–64) (TV series)
- The Mavis Bramston Show (1964–68) (TV comedy series)
- Casebook (1966–67) (TV series)
- You Can't See 'Round Corners (1967) (TV series)
- You Can't See 'round Corners (1969) (film)
- Phoenix Five (1970) (TV sci-fi series)
- Catwalk (1971–72) (TV series)
- Halfway to Nowhere (1972) (TV movie)
- Certain Women (1973–76) (TV serial)
- The Seven Ages of Man (1975) (TV series)
- Kirby's Company (1977) (TV series)
- Melba (1988) (TV miniseries)
