= The Story of Peter Grey =

Television series

- Genre: Daytime soap opera
- Written by: Kay Keavney
- Directed by: David Cahill
- Starring: James Condon
- Country of origin: Australia
- Original language: English
- No. of episodes: 156

Production
- Running time: 15 minutes

Original release
- Network: ATN-7

The Story of Peter Grey is an Australian television daytime soap opera produced by the Seven Network and first broadcast in July 1962 . James Condon starred in the title role as a church minister.

Produced at the Seven Network's ATN-7 studio's in Sydney, the series had a run of 156 fifteen-minute episodes, and was in black and white.

== Plot ==
Peter Grey is a clergyman appointed to a new parish. He is married to neurotic Brenda. He forms a friendship with his predecessor, Rev Henry Marner and the latter's daughter Jane.

== Main Cast ==
- James Condon as Peter Grey
- Lou Vernon as Rev. Henry Marner
- Thelma Scott
- Gordon Chater
- Don Crosby as Doctor
- Stewart Ginn
- Lynne Murphy as Brenda Grey
- Walter Sullivan as Tony Beaumont
- Moya O'Sullivan as Anna Vail
- Diana Perryman as Jane Marner
- Julianna Allan

== Production and broadcast ==
In 1959, the Seven Network (ATN7) announced they would produce three new television series, two 30-minute dramas and a 15-minute "woman's program". The 15 minute show was The Story of Peter Grey produced in the same style as their previous endeavor Autumn Affair which ended on 20 October 1959. Peter Grey was to be shown three times a week and run for 12 months

(The first of the 30-minute dramas was to be called The World of Marius Crump, the story of the devil in the disguise of a charming, whimsical character who wins or loses a soul in each episode, similar to Damn Yankees. Each episode was to be a self-contained story, but Mr Crump will be the central character every week. The series would be written by Richard Lane. It never became am on-going series. Nor did the other 30-minute drama.)

Peter Grey was shot on videotape at the Seven Network. ATN-7's studios. By 4 July 1960 the first four episodes had been taped. By August 1961 it was reportedly halfway through filming.

The show screened in mid-afternoon.

The Seven Network's Melbourne station HSV-7 repeated the series in 1964, accompanied by repeats of Autumn Affair.

The Seven Network, also aired the series in reruns on SAS10 in Adelaide in 1967 on Saturday evenings at 8.30pm.

Every episode of this series is held by the National Film and Sound Archive.

== See also ==
- List of television plays broadcast on ATN-7
