= Catwalk (Australian TV series) =

- Written by: Tony Morphett; Anne Brooksbank
- Starring: John Forgeham; Cornelia Frances; June Salter
- Country of origin: Australia
- Original language: English
- No. of episodes: 13

Original release
- Network: Seven Network
- Release: 1971 – 1972

Catwalk is a 1971 Australian television series created by Tony Morphett. It was a spin-off of an episode of television series Dynasty.

== Plot ==
A spin off from the series Dynasty, Catwalk focused on the daily lives of the staff of a women's fashion magazine, under the direction of flamboyant publisher Saxon Wells (John Forgeham).

== Cast ==
- John Forgeham as Saxon Wells
- Cornelia Frances as Cornelia Heyson
- June Salter as Paula Healy
- Cecily Polson as Miss Jenkins
- John Wood as Ricky Novak
- Christopher Cary as Harry Ellis
- Pat Bishop as Peggy Ellis
- Elli Maclure as Vicki Wilson
- Jacki Weaver as Rock Wilson
- Bill Hunter as Jim Griffin
- Kerry McGuire as Kate Mackenzie
- Michael Latimer as Tony Fielding
- Margo Lee as Margeurite Sommers
- Max Phipps as Jack Wilson
- Jill Forster as Sandra Goodall
- Diana Perryman as Mrs Wheeler
- Peter Hanlon as Peter Wilson
- James Condon as Ray Shannon
- Judy McBurney as Marit Schemmler
- Les Foxcroft as 1st Reporter
