= Casebook (TV series) =

Australian educational documentary series

- Genre: Educational television
- Directed by: David Cahill
- Presented by: Dr John Pond
- Country of origin: Australia
- Original language: English

Original release
- Network: Seven Network
- Release: 1966 – 1968

Casebook is an Australian educational documentary series produced by the Seven Network from 1966 to 1968. It was made with the cooperation of the Australian Medical Association. Each episode usually contained 2–3 segments relating to medical advice given by a real doctor (Dr John) to patients (played by professional actors) suffering from a variety of illnesses.

One of the directors was David Cahill.

Little is known about this series. The National Film and Sound Archive holds about 168 episodes in their collection.
