= Richard Lane (writer) =

Australian writer (1918–2008)

Richard Lane OAM
- Born: Richard Hamilton Lane; 18 January 1918; Coogee, Sydney, Australia
- Died: 20 February 2008 (aged 90); Sydney, Australia
- Occupations: Dramatist and playwright
- Known for: Writing radio and television drama
- Spouse: Lynne Murphy

Richard Hamilton Lane (18 January 1918 – 20 February 2008) was an Australian writer (dramatist and playwright) known particularly for his skillful adaptation of plays and films for radio. He is often called the father of Australian radio drama. His career spanned more than 60 years, and he is recognised not only for his writing achievements but for his contribution to the Australian Writers' Guild. He also wrote for television, and was described after his death as "luminary of the Australian radio and television industries".

== Early life and education ==
Richard Lane was born in the Sydney beach suburb of Coogee, Australia, and went to school in Sydney's northern suburbs at Knox Grammar School in Wahroonga, where "he excelled as an athlete and edited the school magazine".

== Writing career ==
Lane's first short story was published while he was still at school, and more of his stories were published in magazines in the following year. However, it was in radio drama, still in its infancy when he started, that he found his vocation. His first radio play was No Escape.

By the age of 21 Lane had had a number of plays produced by the Australian Broadcasting Corporation (ABC) and he was being recognised as "an exciting new talent".

He became senior playwright at Sydney's radio station 2GB, Australia's largest producer of radio drama. He adapted plays into one-hour dramas, and novels into serial form. He wrote and produced the long-running radio serial Dr Paul.

By 1949, he was recognised as Australia's "foremost radio playwright". He decided at this time to go freelance, and directed as well as wrote radio drama. With the arrival of television in Australia in 1956, he began writing for that medium too.

He wrote for the first Australian produced drama series, Autumn Affair. He adapted classic works, such as Ibsen's Hedda Gabler, into television plays, and Jon Cleary's You can't see 'round corners into a serial.

Lane moved to Melbourne and continued to write for television – for such programmes as Bellbird, Homicide, The Sullivans and Carson's Law – while also writing for radio. He won four AWGIE Awards for his work.

In his later career, he wrote two books on the history of radio drama in Australia, The Golden Age of Australian Radio Drama. These books have been described as "history through biography" and provide a comprehensive record of the actors, writers, producers and directors involved in radio drama at "the time when Australia produced more radio drama than any country in the world".

== Other roles ==
Besides his writing, Lane is known for the work he did in forming the Australian Writers Guild (AWG). He was part of the group which formed it in 1962, and was its Vice-President from 1962 to 1964 and then its third President from 1964 to 1968. He was involved in "setting up state branches for the guild, lobbying for an Australian quota, introducing the AWGIE Awards for writers, and helping establish the Australian Film and Television School".

Lane was also committed to developing a standard industry-wide contract for use between writers and the production companies or networks, using British agreements as a model. While there was initial support within the industry, problems occurred over the issue of residuals, particularly with the ABC. The ABC finally signed the Guild's standard contract in the early 1970s.

== Legacy ==
In 1988, AWG awarded him a special award for outstanding contribution to the guild. This special award, named Richard Lane Award, has become an annual award that is presented to an AWG member "in recognition of their outstanding service to the Guild".

== Awards ==
- 1968: AWGIE (Australian Writers Guild) Award: Major Award for the television adaptation of You Can't See 'Round Corners
- 1975: AWGIE Award: for episode of Bellbird
- 1977: AWGIE Award: for episode of Bellbird
- 1985: AWGIE Award: for Best Radio Adaptation for Great Expectations
- 1988: AWGIE Award (later named The Richard Lane Award): for outstanding contribution to the Guild
- 1996: ASRA (Australasian Sound Recording Association) Award: for outstanding contributions to radio drama in Australia.

== Select credits ==
- Pointless Design (1938) – radio play
- The Remittance Man (1942) -radio play
- Gods in Wedlock – radio play
- Stockade (1942) – radio play
- Autumn Affair (1958–59)
- Johnny Belinda (1959)
- Cross of Gold (1965)
- Boy on an Old Bus (1966) – radio play
- You Can't See Round Corners
- Motel
- Bellbird
