= Homicide (Australian TV series) =

1964–1977 Australian TV series

- Genre: Drama
- Created by: Crawford Productions
- Starring: John Fegan; Alwyn Kurts; Leonard Teale; Bud Tingwell; Terry McDermott; Les Dayman; Norman Yemm; Mike Preston; George Mallaby; Lionel Long; Gary Day; John Stanton; Don Barker; Dennis Grosvenor; Lex Mitchell
- Country of origin: Australia
- Original language: English
- No. of episodes: 510

Production
- Running time: 50 minutes

Original release
- Network: Seven Network
- Release: 20 October 1964 – 18 January 1977

Related
- Ryan

Homicide is an Australian television police procedural drama series broadcast on the Seven Network and produced by Crawford Productions. It was the television successor to Crawfords' radio series D24.

After self-financing the pilot episode, Hector Crawford shopped it around commercial networks for nearly a year, before a series was commissioned in 1964 by Melbourne HSV7 station manager Keith Cairns, although HSV's partner station in Sydney, ATN, initially refused to participate.

== Synopsis ==
The series dealt with the fictional homicide squad of the Victoria police force and the various crimes and cases the detectives are called upon to investigate. Many episodes were based directly on real cases, although the characters (including the detectives) were fictional. The program aired from 20 October 1964 to January 1977, a total of 12 years and 6 months), making Homicide the longest-running Australian weekly primetime drama in history, with 510 episodes produced (the last episode is numbered 509, due to the pilot episode being numbered with an 'A' suffix, making a total of 510), for many years it also held the record for most episodes produced in an Australian weekly primetime drama.

When Blue Heelers ended in 2006, the show equalled this record. However, Homicide ran on-air for longer than Blue Heelers, and had a greater cumulative running time due to the production of five feature-length episodes.

== Cast and characters ==
=== Main Cast ===
Actor	Role	Tenure	Character
John Fegan	Jack Connolly (Inspector)	1964–1969, 204 episodes	A gruff but warm-hearted pipe-smoking Irishman who worked his way up through the ranks from constable. Takes long service leave prior to retiring from the force in episode 204, "Chain of Evidence". (Note: Fegan had asked to leave the show in order to take an extended holiday to his native Ireland)
Terry McDermott	Frank Bronson (Detective Sergeant)	1964–1966, 59 episodes	A capable and calculating detective, married with children, Bronson can be very tough when necessary, but is generally easy-going with a strong core of humanity and humour. Shot dead by an escaped convict played by the then-unknown Gerard Kennedy in episode 58, "Vendetta".
Lex Mitchell	Rex Fraser (Detective)	– 1964–1965, 28 episodes	Young, impulsive, and single, Fraser is a ladies man and a milk drinker (instead of alcohol), and only recently assigned to the squad. Transferred to another squad after being promoted to Senior Detective in episode 27, "Fifth Column".
Leonard Teale	David 'Mac' Mackay (Senior Detective / Detective Sergeant / Detective Senior Sergeant)	1965–1973, 358 episodes	Known as 'Mac', Mackay is a tough cop with high ideals about justice. Initially he has a large chip on his shoulder – he had been a Detective Sergeant before, but was demoted to Senior Detective because of a report by Bronson. This initially triggers conflict when Mackay realizes Bronson is to be his superior officer, but he mellows and matures over the years. Promoted to Sergeant after Bronson's death, Mackay is eventually promoted to Inspector and transferred to Ballarat in episode 383, "Assassin". In the final episode, "The Last Task", Mackay returns to help out his old squad in a case. The final scene has the cast looking through a doorway into the lens of the camera – ostensibly farewelling Mac, but actually saying goodbye to the viewer. (Note: Teale was the programme's longest serving cast member, appearing in 358 of the show's 510 episodes.)
Leslie Dayman	Bill Hudson (Senior Detective)	1966–1968, 104 episodes	A crack shot who hates the idea of killing anyone – but is forced to do so on several occasions in order to protect other people's lives – Hudson is a 'new breed' type of detective, well-trained in scientific methods of detection and with a modern approach to everyday living – in contrast to Connolly's solid beat-trained old-school type of detective. He is transferred from Forensic to assist Homicide after Mackay is seriously wounded by a prison escapee, and remains with the squad after Sergeant Bronson is killed on the case – a death he blames himself for. After being forced to fatally shoot another person once too often, Hudson is granted a leave of absence in episode 161, "The Pay Off". Dialogue in a later episode indicates that Hudson had been transferred back to Forensic and was due to return to work shortly.
George Mallaby	Peter Barnes (Detective / Senior Detective / Detective Sergeant)	1968–1973, 265 episodes	Transferred from the Sydney Vice Squad, Barnes is a brash young cop – and a bit of a swinging bachelor – promoted to Detective at an earlier age than usual. He matures over the years, developing into a talented, formidable detective but retaining his good nature and sense of humour. Promoted to Sergeant after Mackay transfers out, Barnes has a nervous breakdown shortly afterwards from the strain of non-stop murder cases in episode 395, "One Too Many". (Note: As noted above, Barnes was added because the expanding scope of Homicide was proving a strain on the existing actors for location filming; it was decided that adding a permanent fourth detective would help spread the load around the regular cast)
Lionel Long	Alberto "Bert" Costello (Senior Detective)	1968–1969, 49 episodes	Alberto is a first-generation Australian of Italian descent who, like his predecessor Bill Hudson, has been transferred from Forensic. Unlike Hudson, he prefers more action. Killed in a mine cave-in during a case in episode 210, "A Quiet Town".
Alwyn Kurts	Colin Fox (Detective Inspector)	1969–1973, 184 episodes	Originally from Maldara in country Victoria, a widower who lives with his unmarried daughter, Colin Fox is greatly respected by the other detectives, who realise the gruff detectives bark is worse than his bite – but don't let on. Shrewd with a dry sense of humour, Fox has a deep and mature respect for the role he fills. Shot dead by a sniper in episode 383, "Assassin".
Norman Yemm	Jim Patterson (Senior Detective)	1969–1972, 123 episodes	A tough-as-nails cop with a direct methodology and a devoted family man, Patterson had previously boarded with Inspector Fox when posted to Maldara. He has an identical twin brother, Eddie (played by Norman Yemm's real-life twin Gordon), who inadvertently causes havoc in the squad in a case of mistaken identity in episode 249, "The Superintendent". The episode (an out-and-out comedy) includes a legendary dream sequence in which three of the detectives are racing down an alleyway, guns blazing – but trouserless. (Note: In all the two-shots Gordon played Jim while Norman played Eddie, and in single shots Norman played both roles; he also dubbed both their voices. In episode 298, "Inquest", Gordon Yemm doubled for his brother in action sequences after Norman suffered a leg injury) Quits the force after becoming too emotionally involved in a case in which he nearly kills the murderer of a small boy in episode 333, "Grains of Sand".
Michael Preston	Bob Delaney (Senior Detective / Detective Sergeant)	1972–1973, 42 episodes	A Londoner who had been a constable in the British police force before coming to Australia, Delaney is a 'snappy' modern dresser who pushes his clothes and hair length to the regulation limit. Replacing Jim Patterson, Delaney is killed by a letter-bomb in episode 375, "We'll Both Remember Angie"; the episode ends with a police funeral with full honours, specially filmed for the series.
Gary Day	Phillip Redford (Senior Detective)	1973–1977, 134 episodes	A Vietnam veteran who has strong ideas about violence, Phil Redford is also studying law part-time at university. He is Bob Delaney's replacement, he remains to the end of the series.
Charles Tingwell	Reg Lawson (Inspector)	1973–1977, 126 episodes	Recalled to Melbourne from Scotland Yard (after serving with the United Nations peace-keeping forces in Cyprus) to take over the squad after the murder of Inspector Colin Fox. Remains to the end of the series.
John Stanton	Pat Kelly (Senior Detective)	1973–1974, 49 episodes	A tough, no-nonsense detective brought in after Peter Barnes is promoted to Sergeant. Crippled in a car crash when pursuing a criminal in episode 432, "The Fellas Send Their Regards".
Don Barker	Harry White (Detective Sergeant)	1973–1977, 114 episodes	A family man, good-natured joker and incessant talker, but with a tough edge that increasingly comes to the fore. He replaces Peter Barnes after his breakdown, and remains to the end of the series.
Dennis Grosvenor	Mike Deegan (Senior Detective)	1974–1977, 77 episodes	A motorcycle-riding, martial-arts expert transferred to the Homicide squad from Ballarat, where he had worked under Inspector Mackay, as Pat Kelly's replacement. Remains to the end of the series. Characters' ranks (except for Detective Inspector) changed in accordance with real-life changes in the Victoria Police Force. For example, Detective Sergeant Mackay becomes Detective Senior Sergeant to reflect his role as the squad's number-two when this rank was introduced. Barnes becomes a Senior Detective after the rank of Detective was abolished.

== Scripts ==
Homicide scripts explored a number of major social issues, such as:

- pack rape (episode 21, "The Violators")
- sex work (episode 23, "The Brand")
- loneliness, suicide and mercy killing (episode 31, "An Act of Love")
- the occult (episode 34, "Witch Hunt")
- police shooting of criminals (episode 76, "The Snipers")
- road safety (episode 123, "No Licence To Kill")
- drugs (episode 128, "Freakout")
- the plight of pensioners (episode 208, "Everybody Knows Charlie")
- pollution (episode 314, "Fighting Fred")
- use of firearms (episode 405, "Time And Tide")
- 'poofter bashing' (episode 411, "A Crime Against Nature")
- youth gangs (episode 434, "The Graduation of Tony Walker")
- child abuse (episode 463, "The Life And Times of Tina Kennedy")
- the dangers of hitch-hiking (episode 478, "Wipe Out")

Many early episodes were introduced by chief of detectives John Fegan speaking directly to camera, to highlight their significance and, presumably, to indicate they may not be suitable for younger viewers.

Stories were frequently based on real murder cases, including:

- Episode 37, "Colour of Hate", based on the real-life murder of a young police constable. The victim's family later wrote a very appreciative letter to Crawfords in which they described the episode as 'a fine tribute to our son's courage and devotion to duty'. The letter was later read out by Leonard Teale in the 1970 behind-the-scenes documentary The Homicide Story, who noted that it held a special place in the production team's files.
- Episode 39, "A Lonely Place", based on the case of serial killer Arnold Sodeman, who strangled four girls between 1930 and 1935 when affected by alcohol. While Sodeman was hanged after a long legal battle, the episode doesn't indicate what happens to his fictional equivalent.
- Episode 180, "Dead or Alive", based on real-life New Zealand mass killer Stanley Graham, who murdered seven people (four policemen and three civilians) in October 1941. Unlike the real case, where Graham was eventually shot dead by police, the fictional killer is captured alive, and the episode ends with detectives wondering if he will be sentenced to death or found insane.
- Episode 211, "I, Mick O'Byrne", was based on the recent case of Ronald Ryan, the last man hanged in Australia

== Broadcast sheet ==
The first episode aired on 20 October 1964. The debut episode ("The Stunt") was not the first to be produced, with the pilot ("One Man Crime Wave") airing as episode 24A just prior to the departure of Lex Mitchell.

Regular daytime repeat screenings began in the early 1970s running until the early 1980s, as strip programming. Additionally, seven episodes were screened as specials, or part of specials:

- ep. 376 – "Initiation", as part of the HSV-7 nostalgia program "Those Were The Days"
- episodes 379 ("The Last Way Out"), 385 ("The Friendly Fellow"), 394 ("Patterns & Stripes Don't Mix"), 410 ("Bill"), and 463 ("The Life & Times of Tina Kennedy") as part of the program's 30th anniversary celebration in 1994
- ep. 383 – Assassin, shown in November 2005 as part of HSV-7's 50th year celebrations.

In the 1960s, the series was picked up, on a regional basis, by some of the ITV companies in the UK. Not all regions screened the show, which was scheduled in a late-night slot (usually 10:30pm or later), but among those that did were Westward TV, Yorkshire TV, Channel TV, Border TV and Southern Television.

In 2004, the all-film episodes "Flashpoint" (ep. 56) and "Stopover" (ep. 504) were screened cinematically by Melbourne Cinematheque. In August 2010, WIN Television, as part of their late night "Crawford's Classic Drama" series, began sequential repeats from episode 1, but ceased in March 2011 at episode 33 (the pilot "One Man Crime Wave" was not included). The pilot is significant in that one of the actors in the show was Rona Newton-John, elder sister of Olivia Newton-John.

== Production notes and technical specifications ==
Early episodes were in black and white (B&W) with the bulk of material recorded on videotape in the Dorcas street studios of HSV7 using a multicamera setup, with many video directors, the most prolific being Alex Emanuel. Each episode also featured about ten minutes of location footage shot on 16 mm film, predominantly by Ian Jones or David Lee. Total time per episode was 47 minutes. 134 of the episodes were filmed in colour. The opening and closing theme music for the entire series run was the library piece "Victory" written by American composer James Reichert, and intermittent narration from announcer John McMahon was used for the early B&W seasons.

The first "victim" was Ian Turpie shot by Gordon Glenwright, with Susanne Haworth supplying the first pre-credits scream, while Graeme Blundell and Dorothy Crawford look on as uncredited crowd extras. According to The Homicide Story, the first scene ever turned for the pilot was of veteran vaudevillian Al Mack pantomiming a derelict under the Hoddle Bridge next to the Yarra River, possibly filmed as early as 1963/4.

With occasional exceptions, the earliest filmed segments – which often focused on dramatic shots of cars pulling in, gun battles, arrests and fist fights – did not have synchronised sound. Dialogue for these scenes was recorded "post sync". This means that the dialogue was recorded on location but, due to the often low quality of audio recorded in this manner, the actor was required to lip sync the dialogue in a sound-proof studio in the standard filmmaking process known as Additional Dialogue Recording. Location recordings were used infrequently, and usually limited to brief dialogue snatches in enclosed spaces, such as the interior of a car. Sound effects and library underscore music cues (many from KPM Music) would be also dubbed onto the location-shot footage. Both pre-recorded sound effects recordings and the work of Crawford's foley artist would be used, particularly for gunshots and the title sequence's percussive car-door slams as the stars emerge.

Episode 56, "Flashpoint", which first aired on 19 April 1966, was shot as an experiment entirely on film in mountainous locations around Buxton, Victoria and most of the dialogue for this episode was post-synched. Over the years the ratio of film to videotape was increased, and synchronised sound between a Nagra magnetic tape recorder and a maneuverable Arriflex camera became the location norm by the late 1960s leading to more efficiency and documentary authenticity. When the series switched from B&W to colour in 1973, it necessitated shooting entirely on film, as the HSV7 studios were yet to be converted to colour video production, and it was also beneficial for foreign market sales.

If a script was amended, a Crawford Productions staff member who lived near the actor concerned would be required to deliver the new script to their house. Quite often this new dialogue had to be memorised for filming the next day.

The workload for the regular actors, especially for location work, was notoriously heavy. In 1967 the regular squad was increased from three to four to better share the load, which remained the standard team to the end. In 1972, when it was decided to transfer production entirely to film, the result was a massive increase in overtime demanded by the series. Teale and Kurts promptly quit, and Mallaby only re-signed with a 13-week "escape clause", which he eventually invoked. All cited the worsening workload, which was best expressed by Teale as he announced his departure from the show:

"There has never been a dispute over basic pay rates; the dispute has always involved the massive overtime that Crawfords want me to work in the new year. In the end it became a simple choice between my marriage and Homicide. I chose my marriage." (Note: As it turned out his decision was a good one; Teale and his wife remained together until his death some 20 years later)

== Feature film ==
Late in the show's run – between episodes 470 and 480 – a feature-length episode was filmed. This film was entitled Stopover, with the title Homicide not used at all, and was shot entirely on film on new sets and on location at Melbourne Airport. Lawson, White, Deegan and Redford are the detectives in the film. The story involved an international rock band that was held at the airport following the fatal overdose of a band member. Guest stars included Jon English as the band's lead singer, and Tony Bonner as the band member who overdosed. The film, directed by Igor Auzins, never received a cinema release but was shown on television as a special telefilm in 1976. It is officially listed as episode 504, with episodes 502 and 503 also being feature-length.

== Awards ==
Homicide won multiple awards for its scripts, including three AWGIEs, two Logies, one Penguin and one Sammy Award:

=== AWGIEs ===
Year	Result	Recipient	Category	Episode		Ref
Year	Result	Recipient	Category	No	Title	Ref
1970	Won	John Dingwall	Best Script for a TV Drama Series	208	"Everyone Knows Charlie"	
1975	Won	Peter Schreck	Unknown	434	"The Graduation of Tony Walker"	
1976	Won	Keith Thompson	Best Script for Telemovie	504	"Stopover"	

=== Logies ===
Year	Result	Recipient	Category	Episode		Ref
Year	Result	Recipient	Category	No	Title	Ref
1971	Won	Homicide	Best Australian Drama	—N/a		
1973	Won	Homicide	Best Australian Drama	—N/a		
1974	Won	Leonard Teale	Best Australian Actor	—N/a		
1974	Won	Fred 'Cul' Cullen	Best Script	385	"The Friendly Fellow"	
1975	Won	Fred 'Cul' Cullen	Best Script	414	"Twelve Bar Blues"	

=== Penguin ===
Year	Result	Episode		Ref
Year	Result	No	Title	Ref
1975	2nd Place	434	"The Graduation of Tony Walker"	

=== Sammy ===
Year	Result	Recipient	Category	Episode		Ref
Year	Result	Recipient	Category	No	Title	Ref
1976	Won	Keith Thompson	Best Writer (TV Play)	504	"Stopover"	

== Significance in the TV industry ==
Homicide was the first major dramatic television series to be produced in Australia, the domestic television market having been previously dominated by American and British imports. In 1964, most Australian-made product tended to be quiz shows, children's series, music/variety series and one-off plays, with local drama production sporadic at best, with only a handful of typically short-lived series, rarely running more than 13 episodes, on commercial television such as Autumn Affair, Emergency and The Story of Peter Grey, along with several mini-series on ABC such as Stormy Petrel. Foreign imports were preferred because they were cheaper, slicker and (especially for US series) more plentiful than local productions. Homicide proved that there was a market for home-grown dramatic programming and was highly successful from the start – its initial ratings were in the 30s and regularly rated in the high 40s and even low 50s (modern cop show ratings tend to be in the 20s at best). In addition, the series was produced at a tenth of the cost of an overseas program and easily outrated them, despite stiff competition from hit American shows. In 1971, it was the top-rated show in the country. Another Crawfords police drama, Division 4, was second.

Australia had little theatrical or film experience, and the series also proved itself to be a virtual training ground for Australian television and film production. During its 12-year run, almost everyone in the industry – actors, directors, scriptwriters, producers, camera crew, stunt performers etc. – got their start or worked on the series at some point in their careers, and guest roles were filled by many notable actors, both established and emerging. Steady roles in long-running Crawford series helped convince successful expatriate actors like Charles Tingwell and Michael Pate to return to their homeland after decades in Hollywood or the UK. For these reasons, as well as for inspiring a series of popular cop dramas that followed, it remains one of the most important programmes in the history of television in Australia.

In 1994, a special tribute to the series aired titled Homicide: 30 Years On, hosted by Blue Heelers stars John Wood and Lisa McCune, which included interviews with surviving cast members and guest stars (both Fegan and Teale had already died before then). In 2007, Homicide was chosen for an Australia Post stamp to celebrate 50 years of television in Australia.

== DVD release ==
Homicide has been released on DVD in a series of box sets since December 2012. Each box set contains 26 episodes on 7 discs. Twenty box sets and a bonus disc of The Homicide Story (1970) have been released, representing the complete series run.

== See also ==
- City Homicide
- List of longest-running Australian television series
