= Erik Award =

The Erik Kuttner Award, known as the Erik Award, was an annual drama critics' award for professional theatre in Melbourne, Australia.

Established in 1955, the award had categories for actors, actresses, producers (directors) and designers. It operated through to 1981.

The award statuette was designed by Julius Kuhn and was named after German-Australian actor and producer Erich "Erik" Kuttner (died 1954) commemorating his work in Melbourne theatre. The first ceremony in 1955, featured an appearance by British actress Dame Sybil Thorndike, who presented the best actor and actresses awards.

The Erik Awards were discontinued in 1981 and succeeded by the Green Room Awards which started in 1982.
