= Obscene libel =

Abolished English common law criminal offence

The publication of an obscene libel was an offence under the common law of England. Prior to the abolition by section 1 of the Criminal Law Act 1967 of the distinction between felony and misdemeanour, it was regarded as a misdemeanour. It has been abolished in England and Wales and Northern Ireland.

The existence of this offence was denied by Hawkins; and by Holt, C.J., who said that it was within the jurisdiction of the spiritual courts.

== England and Wales ==
It was an offence under the common law of England and Wales to publish an obscene libel. This was an indictable-only offence. However, section 2(4) of the Obscene Publications Act 1959 provided that a person publishing an article should not be proceeded against for an offence at common law consisting of the publication of any matter contained or embodied in that article where it was of the essence of the offence that the matter is "obscene". For this purpose the word "obscene" was defined by section 1(1) of that Act.

Lord Reid said:

The obvious purpose of s 2(4) is to make available, where the essence of the offence is tending to deprave and corrupt, the defences which are set out in the Act.

Accordingly, the effect of section 2(4) is that it was not possible for a person to be prosecuted for this offence, unless the definition of "obscene" at common law was wider than the statutory definition of "obscene". This was probably not the case, because the statutory definition is a paraphrase of the definition given by Lord Cockburn, J., in R v Hicklin (1868) L.R. 3 Q.B. 360 at 371.

The offence was abolished when section 73(c) of the Coroners and Justice Act 2009 came into force on 12 January 2010.

== See also ==
- Obscenity
- Criminal libel
- Libel
