= Autumn Affair =

- Genre: Soap opera
- Screenplay by: Richard Lane
- Directed by: Ken Hannam; David Cahill
- Starring: Muriel Steinbeck
- Country of origin: Australia
- Original language: English
- No. of episodes: 156

Production
- Running time: 15 mins

Original release
- Network: ATN-7
- Release: 20 October 1958 – 20 October 1959

Autumn Affair is an Australian television soap opera made and aired by Network Seven station ATN-7 in Sydney, and also shown in Melbourne on Nine Network station GTV-9. Television in Australia had only been broadcasting since 1956 and the Seven Network was the first commercial station to make drama a priority. The series was written by former radio writer Richard Lane.

It premiered on Monday 20 October 1958 and continued until 20 October 1959.

The series was not the first television drama made in Australia; that was The Adventures of Long John Silver which was broadcast in the United States and United Kingdom before television was available in Australia. A second locally produced drama series,The House on the Corner, was broadcast live. The only other drama content produced locally at this time was televised plays broadcast by the ABC. Autumn Affair was however the first Australian-produced television soap opera to air in that country.

== Synopsis ==
Autumn Affair centre's around the love lives of a middle aged widow, Julia Parrish, and her daughter, Meg.

== Cast ==
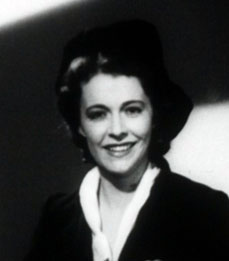
Muriel Steinbeck who played Julia Parrish

- Muriel Steinbeck as Julia Parrish
- Queenie Ashton as Granny Bishop
- Leonard Bullen as Steve Meadows
- Janette Craig as Meg Parrish
- John Juson as Mark
- Diana Perryman as Julie
- Owen Weingott as Larry Muir

== Production ==
The program was conceived from a conversation between radio writer Richard Lane and Len Mauger, station manager of Seven Network. There was a quarter hour gap in the schedule and Mauger was keen to develop use of video tape for drama. It was decided to make a 15-minute show using skills developed by those involved in The House on the Corner.

Originally conceived under the title Julia: An Early Autumn Affair, the title was later shortened to just Autumn Affair.

Many of the actors and writers involved in the production had previously worked on radio soap opera, and were inexperienced with television acting.

Episodes were fifteen minutes in duration, recorded as kinescopes in black and white, and were screened Mondays, Tuesdays and Wednesdays at 8:45 AM. a part of the station's Today breakfast program.

There were three main conditions for the production:

- it had to be written, produced and acted by Australians
- it had to stand on its own as entertainment and compare with American imports
- it had to be sold to other stations at comparable rates to the American imports.

The series went into production without a sponsor, as the station ATN7 wanted to gain experience in television drama production.

The cast comprised just six regulars; the story focused on Julia (Muriel Steinbeck), a widow in a love triangle situation with two men.

Filmink later wrote that "Steinbeck was... a natural choice to play the lead... She laughed, loved and suffered with jolly good decency – the quintessential Muriel Steinbeck part." Ailsa McPherson, who worked on the show as script assistant, wrote "for performance quality Autumn Affair relied heavily on Muriel Steinbeck's professionalism and her photographic memory. She had a prodigious capacity to remember lines and to be almost word perfect after reading them aloud only three or so times. It saved the episode on a good many occasions."

The series was well-received when originally broadcast.

Richard Lane wrote every episode. There were only two main sets and some small side pieces. Actors also would leave the series - Janette Craig accepted the role of Bubba in theatre production of Summer of the Seventeenth Doll and had to be written out.

David Cahill left the show after directing 72 episodes. He was replaced by Ken Hannam. The series ended in 1959 after 156 episodes.

In a 1960 article in the Sydney Morning Herald, it was noted that although mistakes were made during the production of the series due to inexperience, it nevertheless paved the way for improved locally produced drama productions.

Cast members Queenie Ashton and Janette Craig had previously appeared in a 1957 ABC TV play together called Tomorrow's Child, though it is not known if a copy of the production still exists.

Every episode except for two of this series are held by the National Film and Sound Archive.

== Later screenings ==
In 1964 HSV-7 Melbourne repeated the series, along with early 1960s Australian soap opera The Story of Peter Grey. In 1964 CTC-7 in Canberra screened the series along with Peter Grey, the station having not been in operation during the original run of the series. CTC kept the repeats on their schedule into 1966.

== See also ==
- Shell Presents – 1959–1960 series of one-off plays produced for Australian television
- Emergency – Short-lived 1959 Australian medical drama
- List of television plays broadcast on ATN-7
- List of live television plays broadcast on Australian Broadcasting Corporation (1950s)
