= Shell Presents =

- Advertisement in Sydney Morning Herald on 1 April 1959
- Genre: Anthology
- Country of origin: Australia
- Original language: English

Production
- Producer: Brett Porter

Original release
- Network: ATN-7; GTV-9
- Release: 4 April 1959 – 5 March 1960

Shell Presents is an early attempt at Australian television drama, being an umbrella title for several different productions. It debuted on 4 April 1959, and aired on ATN-7 and GTV-9, who split production of plays for the series between them. It was an anthology series, each program being a self-contained play for television. The series won a Logie Award in 1960 for TV Highlight of 1959. It was sponsored by Shell. It was described as "a very big deal for the station: major institutional sponsorship from international companies for locally produced drama." It would be followed by The General Motors Hour.

Though it usually presented straight drama, it also presented a live musical production titled Pardon Miss Westcott, set in colonial-era Australia. A total of 13 productions aired under the Shell Presents banner from 1959 to 1960. Some of the productions are held at the National Film and Sound Archive. ATN-7 originally announced that the second episode of Shell Presents would be an adaptation of Children of the Sun by Morris West but that was not made.

The first drama from GTV-9 in Melbourne was meant to be a production of Arthur Miller's All My Sons.

Some of the productions were based on overseas plays (such as Thunder of Silence), while some were locally written, such as The Big Day (by Sydney author John Ford).

An article in the 30 October 1960 edition of the Sydney Morning Herald titled "Australian TV is growing up", while not mentioning it by name, nevertheless provides some information on the series. The article said that the production of "modestly unpretentious" soap opera Autumn Affair provided some of the experience needed to produce Shell Presents productions like Johnny Belinda, and listed the cost to produce Pardon Miss Westcott at £5,000 (a considerable budget at the time). It mentions that work on a live drama production of the era started a month to six weeks before telecast, and that a video-tape of the final rehearsal was made so cast and camera crew could correct last minute faults.

Five of the episodes may have been shown in Perth during 1960 on station TVW-7.

== History ==
In February 1959 leading Australian writers were invited to present plays for the series.

== Episodes ==
No.	Title	Original Station	Original release date
1	"Johnny Belinda"	ATN-7	4 April 1959
2	"Other People's Houses"	ATN-7	2 May 1959
3	"Tragedy in a Temporary Town"	GTV-9	16 May 1959
4	"They Were Big, They Were Blue, They Were Beautiful"	ATN-7	27 June 1959
5	"The Big Day"	GTV-9	11 July 1959
6	"Thunder of Silence"	ATN-7	22 August 1959
7	"Ruth"	GTV-9	5 September 1959
8	"A Tongue of Silver"	GTV-9	5 October 1959
9	"Rope"	GTV-9	14 November 1959
10	"Pardon Miss Westcott"	ATN-7	12 December 1959
11	"No Picnic Tomorrow"	ATN-7	9 January 1960
12	"Reflections in Dark Glasses"	ATN-7	6 February 1960
13	"Man in a Blue Vase"	GTV-9	5 March 1960

== Ratings success ==
On 20 July 1959, a Sydney Morning Herald article said the program had an estimated audience of around 300,000 in both Sydney and in Melbourne.

== See also ==
- List of live television plays broadcast on Australian Broadcasting Corporation (1950s) – One-off plays on ABC
- Killer in Close-Up – 1957–1958 anthology of four half-hour plays on ABC
- List of television plays broadcast on ATN-7
