= The Square Ring (1960 film) =

1960 Australian television play

- Ad in SMH 18 Apr 1960
- Based on: play The Square Ring by Ralph Peterson
- Directed by: Raymond Menmuir
- Country of origin: Australia
- Original language: English

Production
- Running time: 90 mins
- Production company: ABC

Original release
- Network: ABC
- Release: 20 April 1960 (Sydney, live)
- Release: 10 August 1960 (Melbourne)

The Square Ring is a 1960 Australian TV play based on a stage play by Australian Ralph Petersen which had been successful on the stage in England and been filmed in 1953.

It was recorded live in Sydney.

== Plot ==
The story of six fighters who wait for their turn in the ring one night at a boxing ring in England. Ex champ Docker Starkie is trying to make a comeback; Eddie Burke is a new boy on the way up; Harry Coombers is a certain future champion; Rick Martell is planning on throwing a fight; Sailor Johnson is a broken-down has-been; Rawlings likes to read books before a fight.

Mixing with them all is the dressing room attendant Danny Felton who has seen fighters come and go and understand them. There is also associated characters like a stadium manager.

== Cast ==
- Don Barkham as Eddie Burke
- Guy Doleman as Harry Coombes
- Jack Fegan as Docker Starkie
- Ken Goodlet as Sailor Johnson
- Joe Jenkins as Rowdie Rawling
- Owen Weingott as Rick Martell
- Edward Hepple as Danny Felton, the handler
- Al Thomas as the stadium manager
- Ben Gabriel as Joe
- Louis Wishart as stadium doctor
- Max Osbiston as Watty
- John Unicomb as Ford

== Production ==
Sydney boxing trainer Ern McQuillan was the technical advisor for the story. Joe Jenkins, who appeared often on television as a dancer, makes his acting debut as Rowdie Rawlings. He would later go on to appear in several Australian TV dramas such as The Emperor Jones, Two-Headed Eagle and The End Begins.
