= Turning Point (1960 film) =

- Genre: thriller
- Written by: Denys Burrows
- Directed by: Raymond Menmuir
- Country of origin: Australia
- Original language: English

Production
- Producer: Raymond Menmuir
- Running time: 75 mins
- Production company: ABC

Original release
- Network: ABC
- Release: 24 February 1960 (live, Sydney)
- Release: 9 March 1960 (taped, Melbourne)
- Release: 5 April 1960 (Brisbane)

Turning Point is a 1960 Australian television play.

It was broadcast live on the ABC from Sydney on the night of 24 February. In Melbourne the ABC were doing a live broadcast of the play Eye of the Night. These two were the first in a series of ten plays made by the ABC in 1960 using local writers, others including The Astronauts and The Slaughter of St Teresa's Day. (Other plays possibly included Close to the Roof, Dark Under the Sun, The Square Ring, Who Killed Kovali?, and Swamp Creatures.)

== Plot ==
A murderer on the run, Chicka, stops in a remote South Australian town of Edenberrry. He kidnaps one of its women, Joan, when he thinks the town's policeman is going to arrest him. He runs off with her, punctures his petrol tank, but returns to kill her children after she runs away while he sleeps. The policeman arrives just in time to save the situation.

== Cast ==
- Rod Milgate as Chicka
- Benita Harvey as Joan
- Deryck Barnes as policeman
- Jane Coghlan
- Tom Farley
- Ben Gabriel as Steve Pringle
- Reg Lye as Lucy

== Production ==
Early Australian TV drama production was dominated by using imported scripts but in 1960 the ABC was undertaking what has been described as "an Australiana drive" of producing local stories. It was the first of ten Australian television plays to be produced by the ABC in Sydney and Melbourne in 1960. The writer Denys Burrows was also an actor; it was his first TV play. He based the settings and the character on a trip he made through central Australia. "The township in the play and the dialogue is fictional, but the setting and characters are based on a town we passed through," said Burrows. "I remember the place well - it was 114 degrees in the shade when we arrived there. The people were most kind and I thought at the time what a story there would be in the way they had to live the struggle. I filed the idea away in my mind and it gradually matured."

Burows described the town as "six shacks, a pub a lot of bare earth and a railway line."

Rod Milgate had only been acting professionally for 12 months. Benita Harvey said the role was a departure for her as "because of my dark features I'm usually chosen for cosmopolitan roles."

Outdoor scenes were to have been filmed on location south of Sydney. However on the day the crew went to film them, the sun stayed behind the clouds all day. These scenes were finally shot against a mock up background in the studio under large lamps.

== Reception ==
The Sydney Morning Herald called it "an unsuccessful attempt to graft an unconvincing crime melodrama on to a documentary treatment of outback life... The author's observation is better than his plot-planning and when the life of the remote, heat-hammered cluster of shacks was allowed to move along its normal lines and at its own pace, there were moments of genuine interest and accomplishment—except that the pace of Raymond Menmuir's production... tended to be a bit slow. A competent cast... worked very effectively when they were allowed by the script to be real characters."
