= Eye of the Night =

- Genre: thriller
- Written by: Kay Keavney
- Directed by: Christopher Muir
- Country of origin: Australia
- Original language: English

Production
- Running time: 75 minutes
- Production company: ABC

Original release
- Network: ABC
- Release: 24 February 1960 (live, Melbourne)
- Release: 6 April 1960 (Sydney, taped)

Eye of the Night is a 1960 Australian television play. It was written by Kay Keavney and directed by Christopher Muir.

It was broadcast live on the ABC from Melbourne on the night of Wednesday 24 February. In Sydney on the same night the ABC were doing a live broadcast of the play The Turning Point. These two were the first in a series of ten plays made by the ABC in 1960 using local writers, others including The Astronauts and The Slaughter of St. Teresa's Day. (Other plays possibly included Close to the Roof, Dark Under the Sun, The Square Ring, Who Killed Kovali?, and Swamp Creatures.)

== Plot ==
A man breaks into homes at night and terrorises women. He eludes police for two years. In the Melbourne suburb of Sunshine, a woman, Ruth Arnott, fears that a man in her own house, a man oppressed by his mother, may be the attacker. The opening scenes take place at Victorian Police Headquarters with the rest at a house in Sunshine.

== Cast ==
- Beverley Dunn as Ruth Arnott
- Brian James as her accountant brother-in-law, Frank Arnott
- Dennis Miller as her husband Ian Arnott
- Nevil Thurgood
- Syd Conabere as a detective
- Moira Carleton as the next door neighbour
- Agnes Dobson
- Dennis Miller as Ian Arnott

== Production ==
Early Australian TV drama production was dominated by using imported scripts but in 1960 the ABC was undertaking what has been described as "an Australiana drive" of producing local stories. This was based on an original script by Kay Keavney an experienced writer for radio as well as TV series like The Story of Peter Gray.

To prepare for the production, Muir visited the police department to study criminal detection techniques and meet psychologists. According to The Age Beverly Dunn "has a difficult role to play, involving several emotional scenes".
