= The Devil Makes Sunday (1962 film) =

- Advertisement from The Age 21 Feb 1962
- Genre: Historical
- Screenplay by: Bruce Stewart
- Directed by: William Sterling
- Country of origin: Australia
- Original language: English

Production
- Running time: 70 minutes
- Production company: ABC

Original release
- Network: ABC
- Release: 21 February 1962 (Melbourne, live)
- Release: 14 March 1962 (Sydney, taped)

The Devil Makes Sunday is a 1962 Australian television play by New Zealand-born author Bruce Stewart. It was broadcast live from Melbourne, and taped and shown in other cities at a later date.

It was one of the most violent plays on early Australian television.

The play had previously been performed on British and US television. Australian TV drama was relatively rare at the time. Filmink magazine wrote "this, along with Light Me a Lucifer, is the old Australian TV play more than any other we wish we could see because it sounds very exciting."

== Premise ==
In 1840, the convict settlement on Norfolk Island is run by Major Childs, who likes to punish convicts before church service on Sunday. A convict called Clay breaks out of prison and holds up the prison governor and his household in their dining room. Clay demands a boat for his escape.

== Cast ==
- Syd Conabere as Clay
- Mark Kelly as Jack
- Robert Peach as Major Childs, the prison governor
- Carole Potter as Dora Childs
- David Mitchell
- Don Crosby as Dr McCombie

== Production ==
Syd Conabere, who plays Clay, had previous performed in that role in an adaptation of the play for ABC Radio in 1961.

Producer William Sterling said Stewart wrote a "marvelous emotional study in his play."

The production was shot in Melbourne.

== Reception ==
The TV critic from the Sydney Morning Herald thought the production was "chiefly remarkable for the briskness of its violence" listing the "five deaths by shooting, one by strangulation and one by public flogging. Even a hardworking Elizabethan playwright of the most bloodthirsty kind would have thought this a respectable tally."

He added "Stewart's principal characters were merely mouthpieces for a set of ethical attitudes. Because they were so obviously pieces on a moralistic chessboard and because their dialogue dealt in words like good and evil without once making these seem more than black and white abstractions, their predicament was almost totally unmoving."

He also felt producer (director) William Sterling "was busy enough with his properties and cameras...but he seemed actually to have encouraged the actors playing the prison commandant and the chaplain to emphasise the intrinsic hollowness of their dialogue." However the performance of Sydney Conabere was praised.
