= Act of Violence (disambiguation) =

Act of Violence is a 1949 film noir directed by Fred Zinnemann.

Act of Violence may also refer to:

- Act of Violence (1956 film), a 1956 British TV play
  - Act of Violence (1959 film), a 1959 Australian remake
- Dog Eat Dog (1964 film), pre-release title An Act of Violence, a 1964 German crime drama film
- Act of Violence, a 1979 made-for-television movie starring Elizabeth Montgomery
- "Act of Violence", an episode of The F.B.I. TV series
- "An Act of Violence", 1976 episode of Joe Forrester (TV series)

== See also ==
- Acts of Violence, a 2018 film starring Bruce Willis
- A Simple Act of Violence, a 2008 novel by R. J. Ellory
