= Wild Life and Christmas Belles =

- Directed by: William Sterling
- Country of origin: Australia
- Original language: English

Production
- Running time: 60 minutes
- Production company: ABC

Original release
- Release: 10 December 1958 (Melbourne)
- Release: 31 December 1958 (Sydney)

Wild Life and Christmas Belles is a 1958 Australian television revue. It was shown on New Year's Eve, running from 10:55 pm until a few minutes before midnight. It was filmed in ABC's Melbourne studios but was shown in Sydney and Melbourne simultaneously. The cast included Barry Humphries, who played Mrs Norma Everage. The sketch had Mrs Everage enter a special model school for the "Lovely Mother" quest.

== Cast ==
- Syd Conabere
- Jennifer Eddy
- Barry Humphries
- Bettine Kauffman
- Mary Hardy
- Patricia Kennedy
- Peggy Marks
- Bambi Smith

== Reception ==
The Age called it "sensational".

Response was positive enough to lead to another revue, Trip-Tease and High C's.
