= Carole Potter =

Australian actor

Carole Potter was an Australian actor best known for her work in the early days of Australian television. She was born in England and moved to Australia in 1957. Her TV debut was made when she was 15 in The Governess. She married director William Sterling with whom she often collaborated.

== Select filmography ==
- The Governess (1958)
- The Lark (1958)
- Heart Attack (1960)
- Who Killed Kovali? (1960)
- The Lady from the Sea (1961)
- The Big Deal (1961)
- Night of the Ding-Dong (1961)
- The Ides of March (1961)
- The Devil Makes Sunday (1962)
- Shadow of the Vine (1962)
- The Hobby Horse (1962)
- Murder in the Cathedral (1962)
- The Chinese Wall (1963)
