= Prelude to Harvest =

- Genre: historical
- Written by: Kay Keavney
- Directed by: Colin Dean
- Country of origin: Australia
- Original language: English

Production
- Producer: David Tapp
- Running time: 60 mins
- Production company: ABC

Original release
- Network: ABC
- Release: 27 January 1963 (Sydney, Melbourne)

Prelude to Harvest is a 1963 Australian television play. It was written by Kay Keavney and directed by Colin Dean.

The production was broadcast to celebrate the 175th anniversary of Captain Phillip's landing at Sydney Cove.

== Plot ==
In January 1789 in London, a ship is loading up with convicts including 200 women. Six months later the ship is still there with the convicts on board, in miserable condition.

In Sydney, a ship is meant to arrive with supplies but is wrecked on the way. Governor Philip must come up with a plan to avoid famine in the colony.

== Cast ==
- Wynn Roberts as Governor Phillip
- Deryc Barnes as John Nicol
- Edward Howell as Lt Edgar, RN
- Neva Carr-Glyn was Mrs Barnsley
- Richard Meikle as Captain Collins
- Alan Herbert as Briggs
- Terry McDermott as James Ruse
- Joan Morrow as Sarah
- Mary Reynolds as Elizabeth
- Henry Gilbert as Major Ross
- Reg Gorman as Seaman
- Mark McManus as Seaman
- Ric Hutton as Watkin Tench
- Edmund Pegge as Lt Daws
- Keith Buckley as Lt King, RN
- Betty Dyson

== Production ==
Australia Day 1963 would mark the 17th anniversary of Captain Phillip's landing at Sydney Cove. The ABC decided to commemorate it by commissioning two productions to screen over the Australia Day weekend - The Land That Waited, a 50-minute documentary on the history of white exploration and settlement in Australia which screened on Saturday January 26, and Prelude to Harvest.

Rehearsals took place on November 12–14, 1962.
