= The Emperor Jones (1960 TV film) =

- Ad from SMH 13 Jun 1960
- Genre: drama
- Based on: The Emperor Jones by Eugene O'Neill
- Written by: Alan Burke
- Directed by: Alan Burke
- Starring: Joe Jenkins
- Country of origin: Australia
- Original language: English

Production
- Running time: 60 minutes
- Production company: ABC

Original release
- Network: ABN-2 (Sydney)
- Release: 15 June 1960 (Sydney, live)
- Release: 6 July 1960 (Melbourne)
- Release: 8 July 1960 (Brisbane)

The Emperor Jones is a 1960 Australian TV play based on the play The Emperor Jones by Eugene O'Neill. It starred Joe Jenkins, a dancer who was living in Australia. He played a triple role.

Joe Jenkins was a rare black actor who played lead roles in Australia at the time; he had also appeared in The Square Ring, Cafe Continental, The BP Super Show, The Two Headed Eagle and The End Begins on Australian TV. The Emperor Jones has been called the first Australian TV drama to have a black actor in the lead.

== Plot ==
Jones runs an "empire" on an island in the West Indies. The action begins when Smithers, a trader, arrives on the island to discover Jones' subjects have revolted and Jones has to escape.

Jones is terrified of the pursuing natives. He has nightmares where he meets Jeff, the man he killed in a razor fight, and another man he killed with a shovel. The nightmare then becomes a medium of regression. Jones goes beyond his own past until he finds himself on the first slave ship from Africa.

== Cast ==
- Joe Jenkins as the Emperor Jones/the witchdoctor/porter
- Moray Powell as Smithers
- Nellie Small
- Albert le Guerre

== Production ==
Ad from 6 July 1960 The Age

The production was filmed in Sydney at the ABC's studios at Gore Hill. It was directed by Alan Burke, who also adapted Eugene O'Neil's play.

Except for the opening scene between Jones and Smithers, and some scenes at the end involving some natives, the action was carried by Jones alone. Jenkins said, "This is a role that really gets you and you live every moment of the terror of the man and the jungle. Some of those jungle films were filmed on the coldest nights we experienced but I wasn't cold, the intensity of the acting calls for such concentration."

Joe Jenkins doubles in a number of scenes. He plays a witch doctor opposite himself which Burke achieved by filming the roles separately and later joining the film.

The play was also adapted for Australian radio on the ABC in 1960.

== Reception ==
The TV critic for the Sydney Morning Herald thought "loyalty to stage play conventions, in a medium where they do not belong, restrained the director from seeking the filmic fluency asked for in the quick succession of sketched scenes" in which Jenkins gave a "fine performance."
