= Ned Kelly (television play) =

- Genre: Drama
- Based on: Play by Douglas Stewart
- Written by: Douglas Stewart
- Directed by: William Sterling
- Music by: Robert Hughes
- Country of origin: Australia
- Original language: English

Production
- Producer: William Sterling
- Cinematography: Les Handy
- Running time: 75 minutes
- Production company: ABC

Original release
- Network: GTV-9
- Release: 21 October 1959

Ned Kelly is a 1959 Australian television play adapted from the radio play of the same name.

It focused on two main events – the robbery at Jerilderie and the siege at the Glenrowan Hotel.

It was different from a later TV play about Ned Kelly, Ballad for One Gun.

== Premise ==
Ned Kelly and his gang hold up the hotel at Jerilderie. They retreat to a hideout where they are visited by "The Roo". They realise they have been betrayed by Aaron Sherritt and arrange for him to be shot. They then take over the hotel at Glenrowan.

== Cast ==
- Ken Goodlet as Ned Kelly
- John Godfrey as Steve Hart
- Alan Hopgood as Dan Kelly
- Syd Conabere as Joe Byrne
- Betty Phillips as "The Roo", Ned Kelly's girlfriend
- Betty Kauffman as Mrs Skerritt
- Roland Redshaw

== Production ==
Stewart said one of the play's themes was "the conflict between the over-civilised man and the outlaw and the necessity for a balance between the two attitudes to life. Part of the spirit that was in the celebrated bushranger is still in the Australian character - the deep desire for freedom and impatience with authority."

In July 1959 it was announced the production would be filmed at ABC's Melbourne studios at Ripponlea, with the scene of Kelly's capture shot on location at Glenrowan.

In early August Sterling and a crew did an initial reconnaissance of the Glenrowan area. A unit went out to Glenrowan in late August for three days of filming. A historic building outside the town, the building originally occupied by Constable Bracken, was dressed up to look like the Royal Hotel in Jerilderie. There was also filming at the Strathbogie Ranges and Beaconsfield. William Sterling said this footage could not be duplicated anywhere else in Victoria. Cameraman Les Hendy used an 18-foot hydraulic crane to film at Beaconsfield. Scenes were also shot at Guy's Hill.

Robert Hughes wrote the music score, which also included bush songs from the Kelly years. Les Hendy was cameraman, Harold Fletcher did props, Brian Faull was location manager and Audrey Rogers script assistant.

== Release ==
Ned Kelly aired on 21 October 1959 in Melbourne on GTV-9 and on 26 January 1960 in Sydney.

== Reception ==
The TV critic from the Sydney Morning Herald thought the production "did a disservice to Douglas Stewart's richly poetic and deeply probing play" in the adaptation "which, with the real meat of the play removed, dealt with very little except its bare skeleton." He complained several important speeches were removed and "the play lost its proper perspective" and that William Sterling's direction, "after a promising beginning, failed to bring off a number of all too tricky camera effects."

The critic for The Age felt the program was too influenced by American Western TV shows although adding "there were many praiseworthy features about this production" saying "the outdoor scenes were excellently filmed and the film was blended with the studio presentations more effectively than any 'live' drama I have previously seen... The female characters... were very impressive... it was an interesting and rewarding experiment and I for one would enjoy watching it again." The review prompted a reply from William Sterling where he argued "let's go our own way in television and receive constructive criticism or praise for what we attempt to do for our own history and let us not perpetuate the purely imaginary and stereotyped methods of the average Hollywood television film."
