= Heart Attack (1960 film) =

1960 Australian television play (film)

- Genre: thriller
- Written by: George F. Kerr
- Directed by: William Sterling
- Country of origin: Australia
- Original language: English

Production
- Running time: 65 mins
- Production company: ABC

Original release
- Network: ABC
- Release: 13 January 1960 (Melbourne, live); 9 March 1960 (Sydney)

Heart Attack is a 1960 Australian television play written by George F. Kerr. It was recorded in Melbourne, broadcast "live" there, recorded and shown later on Sydney television. It was received with notably critical hostility. It was one of several thrillers filmed in early Australian television.

The play was also adapted for radio with a 75-minute running time.

== Plot ==
Dr Brian Wynter's career is threatened by a blackmailer called Pearce. Pearce learns of Wynter's affair with another woman before his marriage and threatens to tell the doctor's wife, Judith, unless he is paid. Dr Wynter pays him off but Pearce keeps asking for money. Dr Wynter decides the solution is murder.

== Cast ==
- John Morgan as Dr. Wynter
- Beverley Phillips as Judith
- Edward Brayshaw as Pearce
- Wynn Roberts as Dr. Rutherford
- Marcella Burgoyne as Clare Mackay
- Bruce Archer
- Carol Armstrong
- June Brunelle
- Campbell Copelin
- Edward Howell
- Kendrick Hudson
- Carole Potter

== Production ==
It was Edward Howell's twentieth appearance in live television drama; he had appeared in six in Sydney before moving to Melbourne to star in Black Chiffon. Howell went in for an operation shortly after taping.

== Reception ==
The Age said it "had one of the feeblest plots ever peddled on Melbourne TV... 65 minutes of incoherent mush" and suggested the ABC "stick to imported scripts" for a while.

That paper later said it "set Australian TV playwriting back several years" and then at the end of the year called it the worst Australian drama of the year.

The critic for the Sydney Morning Herald called it a "routine medical-domestic drama... given a routine performance... the play bad a kind of tired professional finish but no real originality in its plot or its techniques"in which the leads "all acted competency but without much real conviction."

== See also ==
- List of television plays broadcast on Australian Broadcasting Corporation (1960s)
