= Ned Kelly (play) =

1942 Australian radio play

- ABC Weekly 20 June 1942
- Genre: verse drama
- Running time: 90 mins (7:30 pm – 9:00 pm)
- Country of origin: Australia
- Language: English
- Home station: 2FC
- Written by: Douglas Stewart
- Original release: June 21, 1942

Ned Kelly is a 1942 radio play by Douglas Stewart about the outlaw Ned Kelly.

It was based on a stage play which was in turn adapted for television.

== Background ==
Stewart wanted to follow The Fire on the Snow "with a play that would be its reverse —a study of the heroic will perverted. Looking for a character who would thus be a kind of Miltonic Satan, a hero yet thoroughly bad, I thought about doing a celebrated New Zealand murderer, but decided he was too repulsive a figure to put on the stage. Then I thought of Ned Kelly.” He said he wanted his play to be “a study of the fascinating mixture of good and bad in Ned’s character — the boisterous good humor that made him popular, the arrogance that made him hated; the murderous impulses that could lead him to attempt to wreck a train; the amazing courage he showed when his plans went wrong; the laughter of the man and the loneliness of the outlaw; the pride that sustained him, and the pride that led to his destruction.”

"I have tried to show in the play that Ned Kelly is remembered because he stands for two things wholly and typically Australian — freedom and courage," said Stewart.

The play was originally written for stage then adapted into radio but was broadcast on radio first.

The play came first in the ABC's 1942 Bonus Play Competition (second was Fountains Beyond, third was Wheat Boat.) The ABC's Frank Clelow said the play "had faults in construction, but many outstanding and memorable qualities" praising "the quality of the verse, its always eloquent language, and its most successful characterisation."

The play was published in book form in 1943.

== Productions ==
The play was first produced in 1942.

Wireless Weekly called it "a worthy successor to the author’s much-discussed Fire on the Snow. The outstanding thing about this play, however, is the dialogue, which may easily set the fashion for a new Australian school of radio drama."

The Advocate critic "was not, I must confess, thrillfully moved by" the play feeling "it wanted less speeches and more movement. There was plenty of diction, but not enough drama."

The ABC felt the production was its most outstanding Australian play of 1942.

The play was produced again on ABC radio in 1945, 1947 (called "the finest Australian radio play of the year"), 1951 and 1959.

Syd Conabere and Wynn Roberts had performed the play on radio in March 1959.

== Cast of 1942 production ==
- Lloyd Berrell as Ned Kelly
- John Nugent Hayward as Joe Byrne
- Brenda Dunrich as barmaid
- Hope Suttor as Ma Jones

== Stage play ==
Ned Kelly
- Written by: Douglas Stewart
- Based on: radio play Ned Kelly by Douglas Stewart
- Original language: English
- Subject: Ned Kelly
- Genre: verse drama

Premiere
- Date premiered: October 14, 1942
- Place premiered: Sydney University Drama Society

It was originally written for stage then adapted into radio but was broadcast on radio first.

=== Productions ===
The stage play was first presented by the Sydney University Dramatic Society, 14 October 1942. It was performed in Melbourne in 1944 with costumes devised by Norman Lindsay. One review called it "an event of first importance in the history of the Australian drama."

There was an amateur production in Sydney in 1947.

It was professionally produced by the Australian Elizabethan Theatre Trust in 1956 with Leo McKern. This production was notably unsuccessful financially and critically.

The play was published in book form in 1943.

== 1959 television version ==
The play was adapted for a 90-minute television film in 1959, starring Kenneth Goodlet and directed by William Sterling.
