= Farewell, Farewell, Eugene =

Play by John Vari

Farewell, Farewell, Eugene was a play by John Vari.

== Plot ==
Two reclusive sisters send greeting cards to the outside world through their cousin, for which they make money that goes into a fund to visit their brother in Africa. Various complications, including a runaway marriage, an abandoned baby's appearance on a doorstep, and a revealing letter follow.

== Adaptations ==
It was adapted for British television and aired on the BBC on the 23 July 1959.

== 1960 Australian TV Version ==
Farewell, Farewell, Eugene
- Based on: Farewell, Farewell, Eugene by John Vari
- Written by: George F. Kerr
- Directed by: Alan Burke
- Country of origin: Australia
- Original language: English

Production
- Running time: 75 minutes
- Production company: ABC

Original release
- Network: ABC
- Release: 10 August 1960

Farewell, Farewell, Eugene was an Australian television adaptation of the play which was broadcast live on ABC on 10 August 1960 in Sydney and later a recorded version was broadcast on 26 October 1960 in Melbourne. The runtime of Farewell, Farewell, Eugene was 75 minutes.

=== Plot ===
Two spinsters try to earn enough money to join their nephew in Africa.

=== Cast ===
- Letty Craydon as Minerva
- Nancye Stewart as Florence
- Moya O'Sullivan as Penny the niece
- Phillip Ross as Mick Delaney
- Ron Shand as Mr Bosworth
- Dora Norris as Mrs Bosworth
- Beryl Marshall as Queenie
- Don Barkham as Willie
- Audrey Teesdale as Mrs Slack

=== Reception ===
The Sydney Morning Herald called it "a refreshing piece of work, in general terms competently assembled, and with one performance in particular adding a final touch of assurance. This was Letty Craydon's picture... [she] so thoroughly sketched the characteristics of a skittish, domineered, furtively-imbibing old lady that she seemed to have grown into the part."

The Sunday Herald called it "a pleasant bit of viewing."
