= The Sound of Thunder (film) =

- Ad in SMH 9 Dec 1957
- Written by: Iain MacCormick
- Directed by: William Sterling
- Country of origin: Australia
- Original language: English

Production
- Running time: 78 mins
- Production company: ABC

Original release
- Release: 23 October 1957 (Melbourne, live)
- Release: 11 December 1957 (Sydney)

The Sound of Thunder is a 1957 Australian television play by Australian writer Iain MacCormick. It starred Moira Carleton. It was described as "the longest and most ambitious play ABN [the ABC] has put over so far" although The Importance of Being Ernest, which followed on 18 December, exceeded it by 12 minutes.

It was made at a time when Australian drama production was rare and was one of the first productions in Melbourne.

== Premise ==
In Italy in 1944, a small advance group of Allied soldiers arrives at an Italian farm to meet up with some partisan troops, with the aim of blowing up a supply dump. There is a love story between Pietro and Lucia.

== Cast ==
- Edward Brayshaw as Pietro
- Judith Godden as Lucia
- Robert Peach as the English Major Campe
- Philip Staintin as Papa
- Lewis Tegart as the Old Man
- Alan Hopgood as Cpl Kutsky
- Syd Conabere as Seppi
- Neville Thurgood as Cpl Little
- John Morgan as Vincente

== Production ==
The Sound of Thunder was the first of a cycle of war plays under the title of The Promised Years. The series was written for BBC television by English writer Iain McCormack. The plays deal with the effect of war on small groups of ordinary people of different nationalities, "small people in the big messup," according to McCormick. They were based on personal war time experiences.

The ABC had previously broadcast Small Victory by MacCormick and would later do Act of Violence (1959) by the same author.

William Sterling went down to Melbourne to produce the play in September and October. (Sterling would later settle in the city.) It involved seven weeks of preparation, three weeks of rehearsals and two days of camera rehearsals before it was telecast, and filmed for Sydney TV. Judith Godden was in holiday in Melbourne when cast. Robert Peach was a compere of C.M.F. entertainment units in Melbourne.

Sterling spent several weeks looking at amateur theatre in Melbourne. He was inspired by Italian neo realism. "It’s right on television,” he says. "You're watching ordinary people, close up, in highly emotional situations." Among the amateurs he cast were Lewis Tegart, who had been acting in Little Theatre for 20 years but never professionally, and Alan Hopgood, who was a school teacher who had been performing in a university revue.

It was filmed out of the Coppin Hall studios.

== See also ==
- List of live television plays broadcast on Australian Broadcasting Corporation (1950s)
