= Symphonie Pastorale (film) =

- Based on: play by André Gide
- Written by: George F. Kerr
- Directed by: William Eldridge
- Country of origin: Australia
- Original language: English

Production
- Production company: ABC

Original release
- Network: ABC
- Release: 12 March 1958 (Melbourne, live)
- Release: 10 April 1958 (Sydney, taped)

Symphonie Pastorale is a 1958 Australian TV broadcast of the play by André Gide.

== Plot ==
The relationship between a pastor and his wife is affected when he brings home a blind girl Claire. He falls in love with her as does his son John. An operation restores Claire's sight.

== Cast ==
- Wynn Roberts as Pastor Etieene
- Maree Tomasetti as the wife
- Beryl Marshall as Claire
- John Kirkbride as John

== Production ==
The play had been filmed with Michele Morgan.

It was recorded in Melbourne at Coppin Hall on and shown to Sydney viewers on 10 April 1958. It was produced by William Eldrige and written by George F. Kerr.

Beryl Marshall was the only member of the cast with TV experience.

== See also ==
- List of live television plays broadcast on Australian Broadcasting Corporation (1950s)
