= Call Me a Liar =

1961 television film directed by William Sterling

- Advertisement from The Age 12 June 1961
- Based on: TV play by John Mortimer
- Directed by: William Sterling
- Country of origin: Australia
- Original language: English

Production
- Running time: 80 mins
- Production company: ABC

Original release
- Network: ABC
- Release: 12 July 1961 (Melbourne, live)
- Release: 20 September 1961 (Sydney)
- Release: 24 April 1963 (Brisbane)

Call Me a Liar is a 1961 Australian TV play. It was shot in Melbourne in studio with some location work. It was Channel 2's 49th live play.

== Plot ==
Sammy Moles lives in a world of make believe. For his employer's benefit he invents a wife and child and for his fellow lodgers he lies about his past, background and job. He meets a German girl called Martha.

== Cast ==
- David Mitchell as Sammy Moles
- Jane Oehr as Martha
- Barbara Brandon as landlady
- Campbell Copelin as man on park bench
- Rose du Clos as lady boarder
- Ken Goodlet as Mr Pheeming
- Joe Jenkins as Dr Bowker
- James Lynch as solitary drinker
- Stewart Weller as street musician
- Ligia Monamis as Indian girl
- Nancy Cato and Peter Oliver as English couple
- Abdul Ghani as an African
- Ron Pinnell as father
- Reginald Newsom as businessman
- Cecile Glass as Finnish girl
- Margherita Kean as bar girl
- Shirley Young as mother

== Production ==
It was based on a TV play by John Mortimer which had been performed in England in 1958. It was also adapted for Australian radio in 1961. The play was filmed again for British TV in 1963.

William Sterling gave the lead to Jane Oehr, a 19 year old second year university arts student who was relatively inexperienced as an actor. She had been in Macbeth and Night of the Ding Don. David Mitchell has been in both those productions as well, along with Who Killed Kovali?, Shadow of Heroes and The Astronauts.

== Reception ==
The Sydney Morning Herald TV critic said the production "had the lightness of heart and the deftness of touch so necessary to such a whimsical part-comedy, part-sentimental drama."
