= Return Journey =

- Directed by: William Sterling
- Produced by: John Sherman
- Cinematography: Gerry Vandenberg
- Budget: $12,000

Return Journey is an Australian film about the Burke and Wills expedition. It was directed by William Sterling and produced by John Sherman.

In 1961 filming began with a cast of four and a crew including Sterling and cameraman Gerry Vandenberg. Filming took place near Alice Springs. They had $12,000 in funds. The plan was to film it on 16 mm and blow it up to 35mm. Filming was difficult - there was trouble with the camera, colour stock and sound track.

The filmmakers did not have enough money to complete the feature film so it was recut as a documentary. In 1966, when John Sherman died, Colin Bennett claimed he had seen three different versions and said the best was a 30-minute documentary version. However, at that stage the film had not yet been released.

== Cast ==
- Edward Brayshaw as Wills
- Peter Carver as Burke
- Syd Conabere as King
- David Mitchell as Gray
