= One Morning Near Troodos =

1959 film by William Sterling

One Morning Near Troodos (1956) is a British TV play by Iain MacCormick which aired on the BBC as part of Sunday Night Theatre. It was the first British TV play about the Cyprus Emergency.

== Plot ==
A journalist in Cyprus is captured by EOKA guerillas. British troops track down the guerrillas and the journalist leads them into a rebel ambush. A woman is attracted to a British soldier.

== 1959 Australian Version ==
One Morning Near Troodos
- Based on: play by Iain MacCormick
- Directed by: William Sterling
- Country of origin: Australia
- Original language: English

Production
- Running time: 90 mins

Original release
- Release: 25 March 1959 (Melbourne, live)
- Release: 8 April 1959 (Sydney, recording)

Iain MacCormick was Australian and a number of his plays, originally written for British TV, were adapted for Australian television. The play was performed live on Australian TV in 1959.

It was the ABC's 22nd live drama made in Melbourne.

=== Premise ===
In Cyprus there has been terrorist activity near Mt Troodos, leading to a large scale operation of British troops and police. Two British journalists arrive in the area: James Stark, is an unscrupulous and influential former MP, and Walters, his hard-drinking offsider. Walters does the work while Start takes the credit. They are not allowed into the fighting zone so make their headquarters in a nearby village. Start decides to deal with the terrorists himself, thereby bringing bloodshed to the village.

=== Cast ===
- Edward Brayshaw
- Syd Conabere
- Carol Armstrong as Lena, the Greek girl attracted to a British soldier
- Lloyd Cunnington
- Frank Gatliff
- Judith Godden
- Ken Goodlet
- Edward Howell
- Robert Peach
- Jennifer Clare

=== Production ===
The play had been performed on Melbourne radio in 1957 and repeated in 1959.

It was rehearsed and filmed at ABC's studios at Ripponlea. There was some location filming on Melbourne streets. It had a cast of fifteen.

A segment of the script was published in The Age as an example of TV scripts. The article said that Australian writers were typically paid between £60-£80 a script.

Alexandra Atanassious was the Greek text adviser.

== See also ==
- List of live television plays broadcast on Australian Broadcasting Corporation (1950s)
