= A Drop in the Ocean =

1972 Australian children's television series

- Genre: Children's television
- Directed by: Barry Sloane
- Starring: Kate Fitzpatrick; Don Barkham
- Country of origin: Australia
- No. of seasons: 1

Production
- Running time: 30 minutes

Original release
- Network: ABC
- Release: 5 November 1972 Sydney

A Drop In The Ocean is an Australian children's television series which first screened on the ABC in 1972. A sequel drama called Birds of Passage was made.

== Plot ==
A Drop In The Ocean follows the story of three children who became involved with smugglers. It was filmed around the wharves and slipways of Balmain on Sydney Harbour.

== Production ==
The series was produced by the ABC's "Young People's Department". The episodes were also edited together as a film to screen overseas. Most of the film's dialogue is improvised. Director Barry Sloane told the Sun Herald: "It gives enormous advantages when working with child actors, and leads to a more natural film."

== Cast ==
- Kate Fitzpatrick as Shirl (a crook)
- Don Barkham as Dingo (Shirl's male accomplice)
- Matthew Crosby (son of actor Don Crosby.)
- Michelle Booker
- Carlos Merlo

== See also ==
- List of Australian television series
