= Moving On (1974 film) =

- Directed by: Richard Mason
- Written by: Anne Brooksbank; Cliff Green
- Produced by: Don Murray
- Starring: Ewen Solon
- Cinematography: Dean Semler
- Edited by: Tim Wellburn
- Production company: Film Australia
- Release date: 1974
- Running time: 57 mins
- Country: Australia
- Language: English

Moving On is a 1974 Australian film about a sheep farmer, George Collier, who moves to a county town.

== Cast ==
- Ewen Solon as George Collier
- Kay Taylor as Elizabeth Collier
- Ken Shorter as Alan
- Lyndel Rowe as Anne
- Carole Yelland as Pauline
- Brian Anderson as Ron
- Michaelle Brooker as Margaret
- Jonathan Hardy as Anne's Boyfriend
- Jeff Ashby as City Man
- Bruce Spence as Road Worker
- Roger Ward as Stock Agent
- John Fegan as Unemployed Grower
- Robert McDarra as Financier
- Carole Ashby
- Edward Howell
- Don Crosby
- Richard Meikle

== Production ==
The film was made by Film Australia to help draw attention to the problems of the rural poor.

== Release ==
The film was widely distributed through non-theatrical film libraries in Australia and screened on television in January 1974. The writer won an award with the Australian Writers' Guild.
