= The Ides of March (1961 film) =

- Ad in The Age 27 Dec 1961
- Written by: Stanley Miller
- Directed by: William Sterling
- Country of origin: Australia
- Original language: English

Production
- Running time: 60 mins
- Production company: ABC

Original release
- Network: ABC
- Release: 21 December 1961 (Melbourne)
- Release: 7 February 1962 (Sydney)
- Release: 20 April 1962 (Beisbane)

The Ides of March is a 1961 Australian television play. Director William Sterling said it was a more impressionistic production than the usual television drama.

== Premise ==
A fantastia on certain events and persons in the last days of the Roman Republic.

== Cast ==
- Brian James as Caesar
- Lynn Flanagan as Claudia
- Bruce Barry as Brutus
- Edward Brayshaw as Catullus
- Don Crosby as Cassius
- Keith Dare as Casca
- Edward Howell as Decius
- Fay Kelton as Pompeia
- Kevin McBeath as Cicero
- David Mitchell as Clodius
- Dennis Mitchell as Marc Antony
- Carole Potter as Cleopatra

== Production ==
William Sterling said:

There is no beginning, middle or end in the recognised manner. Rather the treatment will be impressionistic and sstylised with much of the action mimed by the characters to prerecorded speech. The form of the novel is followed closely and the TV screen can 'picture' the thoughts of the principal characters as well as illustrating the events that have provoked these thoughts. There will be dialogue scenes as well but the play concentrates on centralising the character of Caesar against a vast background canvas that recreates the turbulent of the first century of Rome.

More than 500 yards of material were used to make 24 costumes, five for Cleopatra.

== Reception ==
The TV critic from the Sydney Morning Herald thought "nothing could have seemed less promising" than an adaptation of the novel, which did not seem suited to television, but "the results were surprisingly successful" praising the writing and direction.
