= Act of Violence (1959 film) =

1958 Australian television film

- The Sydney Morning Herald advertisement, 23 Mar 1959
- Based on: Act of Violence; 1956 film by Iain MacCormick
- Written by: Iain MacCormick
- Directed by: Paul O'Loughlin
- Starring: Owen Weingott; Joan Landor; Peter Wagner
- Country of origin: Australia
- Original language: English

Production
- Running time: 75 mins
- Production company: ABC

Original release
- Network: ABC
- Release: 25 March 1959

Act of Violence is a 1959 television play broadcast by the Australian Broadcasting Corporation. It was based on a play by Australian writer Iain Mac Cormick which had previously been broadcast in Britain in 1956. This was typical of Australian television at the time - most locally produced drama consisted of adaptations of overseas stories. Act of Violence aired live on 25 March 1959 in Sydney and on 1 April 1959 aired a taped version in Melbourne

== Plot ==
It is set in the capital city of a country that has endured war revolution and the rule of dictators.

== Cast ==
- Owen Weingott as Alexander
- Joan Landor as Leonara
- Annette Andre
- Lou Vernon
- Max Osbiston
- John Barnard
- Douglas Bladon
- Henry Gilbert
- John Gray
- Charles McCallum
- Robert McDarra
- Peter Wagner
- Ossie Wenban

== Production ==
It was the third of MacCormick's plays to be adapted by the ABC, the others being The Small Victory and The Sound of Thunder.

An advertisement at the time said the production "was in line with ABC policy, followed since the establishment of television, regularly to present fine plays with Australian casts." The ad also claimed it was the ABC's 54th live TV drama.

== See also ==
- List of live television plays broadcast on Australian Broadcasting Corporation (1950s)
