= The Small Victory =

- Ad in The Age 26 Mar 1958
- Directed by: William Sterling
- Country of origin: Australia
- Original language: English

Production
- Production company: ABC

Original release
- Release: 26 March 1958 (Melbourne, live)
- Release: 24 April 1958 (Sydney, taped)

Small Victory is a 1958 television play broadcast by the Australian Broadcasting Corporation. It was set during the Korean War. It was directed by William Sterling and was shot in Melbourne where it aired 26 March 1958.

It was based on a play by Australian author Iain MacCormick. The ABC later broadcast Sound of Thunder and Act of Violence (1959) by MacCormick. Australian TV drama at the time would customarily consist of adaptations of stories that had been tried overseas.

== Plot ==
During the Korean War a group of people are trapped by North Korean troops at the Mission School of the Sacred Heart, including a priest, Father Riley, and a nun, Sister Annalissa. American war correspondent Thompson helps Korean orphan Sophie sneak into the Mission School.

== Cast ==
- Beverley Dunn as Sister Annalissa
- Brian James as Father Riley
- Sydney Conabere as Thompson
- Kira Daniels as Sophie
- John Morgan as the political leader
- Bettine Kaufman
- Neville Thurgood as Sgt Little
- Judith Godden
- Laurier Lange
- Tony Roberts

== Production ==
BBC lighting expert W.R. Whitmore helped with the production (he was in Australia giving lectures on lighting in Sydney and Melbourne). Whitmore had helped light the BBC version. James, Dunn and Morgan had just appeared in the TV play Gaslight. It was one of a number of TV plays featuring Dunn.

Director Will Sterling borrowed a machine gun from the army.

== Reception ==
According to The Age the production was "well received".

== See also ==
- List of live television plays broadcast on Australian Broadcasting Corporation (1950s)
