= Blue Murder (1959 film) =

- Ad from SMH 2 Dec 1959
- Genre: thriller
- Written by: George F. Kerr
- Story by: George F. Kerr
- Directed by: Ray Menmuir
- Country of origin: Australia
- Original language: English

Production
- Running time: 60 mins
- Production company: ABC

Original release
- Network: ABC
- Release: 2 December 1959 (Sydney, live)
- Release: 25 February 1960 (Melbourne, tape)

Blue Murder is an Australian live television play which aired in 1959 on ABC. Broadcast live in Sydney on 2 December 1959, a kinescope ("telerecording") was made of the broadcast so it could be shown in Melbourne (it is not known if it was also shown on ABC's then-new stations in Adelaide and Brisbane).

It is not known if the kinescope recording still exists. Filmink magazine wrote "it sounds as if it would be great, campy fun." It was one of several thrillers filmed in early Australian television.

== Premise ==
On Sydney's north shore, an ageing actress, Thelma Lane-Forest, is killed by her bitter and untalented son, Ricky. The son's girlfriend, Jeanette, has a brother, Philip, who is a theatre critic. A journalist, Lundy, also becomes involved.

== Cast ==
- Ric Hutton as Ricky Lane-Forest
- Nancye Stewart as Thelma Lane-Forest
- Derani Scarr as Jeanette Gage
- Colin Croft as Philip Gage
- Hugh Stewart as Martin Johnson
- Richard Davies as Lundy

== Reception ==
The Sydney Morning Herald felt the plot was illogical, but also called it a "neatly constructed thriller, very competently produced" with "enough gloss on the writing and production to overcome any lingering questions raised by logic; and the play succeeded admirably on its own chosen level – it was craftsmanlike, thoroughly professional and pleasantly diverting."

The story was also adapted into a radio play which was broadcast in 1960.

== See also ==
- List of live television plays broadcast on Australian Broadcasting Corporation (1950s)
