= A Tale of Christmas =

1954 Australian television play by Kay Keavney

A Tale of Christmas is a 1954 Australian television play. It was written by Kay Keavney.

It featured an early performance from Nick Tate and was shot at Pagewood Studios.
