= Wynn Roberts (actor) =

Australian actor (died 2021)

- Wynn Roberts in ABC TV play Moby Dick in 1966
- Born: 29 April 1924; Australia
- Died: 24 August 2021 (aged 97); Tanja, New South Wales, Australia
- Other names: Wyn Roberts, Wynne Roberts
- Occupation: Actor
- Years active: 1947–2001

Wynn Roberts (29 April 1924 – 24 August 2021) credited also as Wyn Roberts and Wynne Roberts, was an Australian character actor of stage, radio, and screen who appeared in more than 70 film and television productions between the late 1940s and 2001. He appeared in numerous TV plays and was also featured in TV miniseries for a career spanning over 50 years.

== Career ==
Roberts was born in 1924 and started his career as an actor in the theatre in 1947, as a character actor, he was best known however for his small guest roles on television series.

He may be most recognisable to international audiences for his role in the cult Grundy Television prison drama, Prisoner (also known as Prisoner: Cell Block H. 1979-1986), in which he appeared as Stuart Gillespie, a mean-spirited prison department inspector, in episodes originally aired in 1980-81. His character's authoritarian regime led to the 1980 season cliffhanger, where a number of inmates escape in a tunnel which subsequently collapses, killing a prisoner and trapping others. Later, in 1987, he guest starred in another Grundy soap opera, Neighbours (1985-), as Frank Darcy, an artist friend of Anne Haddy's character, Helen Daniels. The character memorably wore a leather eye patch and came from the Bungle Bungles, and he and Helen almost moved there together, but in the end, Helen decided to stay in Melbourne with her family and Frank left without her.

He is also known for his prominent role as Sergeant Bumpher in the 1975 film classic, Picnic at Hanging Rock.

He was also a leading stage actor, starting in the late 1940s.

His other guest roles on television included Homicide, Special Squad, The Flying Doctors, Police Rescue, A Country Practice and Wildside. He worked for a number of years in radio.

A 1965 article called him "one of the best and most versatile actors left in Australia - probably the best in Melbourne".

== Death ==
He died in a nursing home on 24 August 2021 in Tanja, New South Wales, aged 97.

== Filmography ==
=== Film ===
Year	Title	Role	Type
1958	Symphonie Pastorale	Pastor Etieene	TV play
1959	Last Call		TV play
1959	Treason		TV play
1960	Heart Attack	Dr Rutherford	TV play
1960	Uncle Martino	Trulla	TV play
1960	Macbeth	Banquo	TV play
1961	Hedda Gabler	Eilert Lovborg	TV play
1961	Burst of Summer	Clinton Hunter	TV play
1961	The Lady from the Sea	The Stranger	TV play
1962	Manhaul	Charles Forrester	TV play
1962	Shadow of Heroes	Laszlo Rajk	TV play
1962	The Hobby Horse	Billy Brocknell	TV play
1962	Light me a Lucifer	Bill	TV play
1962	Murder in the Cathedral	Beckett	TV play
1963	Prelude to Harvest	Governor Phillip	TV play
1964	A Man for All Seasons	Sir Thomas More	TV play
1964	Corruption in the Palace of Justice	Counsellor Enzi	TV play
1964	Everyman	Death	TV play
1964	The Physicists	Mobius	TV play
1965	Romanoff and Juliet	Vadim Romanoff	TV play
1965	A Time to Speak	Gilly (the Doctor)	TV play
1965	Moby Dick - Rehearsed	Ahab	TV play
1965	Macbeth	Macbeth	TV play
1966	The Tape Recorder	Voice of Novelist	TV play
1966	Should the Woman Pay	Gerald Henderson	TV play
1966	Ticket to Nowhere		TV play
1966	Flight into Danger		TV play
1968	Cobwebs in Concrete	Dan Fenner	TV play
1972	The Survivor		Feature film
1972	Flashpoint	Foxy	Feature film
1974	Essington		TV film
1975	Picnic at Hanging Rock	Sergeant Bumpher	Feature film
1977	Listen to the Lion	Hunter	Feature film
1977	Born to Run (aka Harness Fever)	McGinnis	Feature film
1978	Weekend of Shadows	Sergeant Caxton	Film
1982	Fighting Back	Payne	Feature film
1985	Wills & Burke	William Wright	Feature film
1988	The Man from Snowy River II	Priest	Feature film

=== Television ===
Year	Title	Role	Type
1958	Killer in Close Up		TV series, 1 episode
1962	Jonah	Morgan	TV series, 1 episode
1964	Barley Charlie	Jim Fogarty	TV series, 1 episode
1962-64	Consider Your Verdict	Defence Counsel Robert Winter / Crown Prosector Robert Winter	TV series, 19 episodes
1966	Australian Playhouse	Johnson / Gerald Henderson / The Author	TV series, 3 episodes
1967	Sergeant Musgrave's Dance	Sergeant Musgrave	TV miniseries, 1 episode
1967-68	Contrabandits	Joshua Stoney / Arnell	TV series, 2 episodes
1979	Adventure Island	Captain James Cook	TV series, 1 episode
1968-70	Delta	Rand / Janosek	TV series, 2 episodes
1974	Homicide	Ross Bullen	TV series, 1 episode
1975	Behind the Legend	Christopher Brennan	TV series, 1 episode
1978	Skyways	Barney Waters	TV series, 2 episodes
1979	Disneyland	McGinnis	TV series, 2 episodes
1980-81	Prisoner: Cell Block H	Stuart Gillespie	TV series, 9 episodes
1981	Holiday Island	David Owens	TV series, 2 episodes
1980-82	Cop Shop	Alan MacNamara, George Payne, Jack Gren, Walter Green	TV series, 8 episodes
1982	Spring and Fall	Clive	TV series, 1 episode
1984	Waterfront	Inspector Legge	TV miniseries, 3 episodes
1983-84	Carson's Law	Andrew Riley KC / Andrews	TV series, 4 episodes
1984	Special Squad	Superintendent Kerslake	TV series, 3 episodes
1985	One Summer Again	James Smith	TV miniseries, 3 episodes
1985	The Dunera Boys	Slattery	TV miniseries, 2 episodes
1986	Whose Baby?	Edward Hudson KC	TV miniseries, 2 episodes
1986	Sword of Honour	Arthur Lawrence	TV miniseries, 4 episodes
1987	The Petrov Affair	Brigadier Spry	TV miniseries, 2 episodes
1988	Always Afternoon	Pastor Jules	TV miniseries, 1 episode
1988	Neighbours	Frank Darcy	TV series, 5 episodes
1988	All the Way	Maynard	TV miniseries, 3 episodes
1988	The Last Resort	Exeter Shannon	TV series
1988	Spit MacPhee	Judge Laker	TV miniseries, 4 episodes
1989	Rafferty's Rules	Matt Keegan	TV series, 1 episode
1991	Police Rescue	Anthony Mason	TV series, 1 episode
1986-91	The Flying Doctors	Dr Don McKenzie / Bill Richards / Stirling / Mal Pryor	TV series, 4 episode
1991	Embassy	Dave	TV series, 1 episode
1992	Boys from the Bush	Harry	TV series, 1 episode
1992	Bony	Templeman	TV series, 1 episode
1992	The Adventures of Skippy	Grumpy Johnston	TV series, 1 episode
1993	A Country Practice	Gordon Moss	TV series, 2 episodes
1993	Snowy	Alf Rutherford	TV series, 4 episodes
1993-99	Law of the Land	Hamilton Chalmers	TV series, 14 episodes
1995	Snowy River: The McGregor Saga	Sir Harry Garfield	TV series, 1 episode
1996	Sun on the Stubble	Ebeneezer Blitz	Miniseries, 2 episodes
1997	Big Sky	Fred Morgan	TV series, 1 episode
1999	Wildside	Lionel	TV series, 1 episode
2001	The Farm	George Cooper	Miniseries, 3 episodes

== Theatre ==
Year	Title	Role	Type
1947	Othello	Brobantio (Desdemona's Father)	Melbourne Repertory Theatre
1950	An Inspector Calls	Eric Birling	University of Melbourne
1951	Desert Highway		University of Melbourne, National Theatre, Melbourne, Hobart
1952	Montserrat		University of Melbourne
1953	The Giaconda Smile	Henry Hutton	University of Melbourne
1954	Ned Kelly	Ned	University of Melbourne
1954	Escape	Matt Dennant	University of Melbourne
1956	Death of a Salesman	Uncle Ben	University of Melbourne
1956	Misalliance	Mr Tarleton	University of Melbourne
1957	The Play's the Thing	Almady	University of Melbourne
1957	Our Town	Dr Gibbs	University of Melbourne
1957	The Matchmaker	Horace Vandergelder	University of Melbourne
1957	Tonight in Samarkand		University of Melbourne
1957	Ring Around the Moon		University of Melbourne
1957	Cat on a Hot Tin Roof	Brick	University of Melbourne
1957	Arsenic and Old Lace	Jonathan Brewster	University of Melbourne
1957	A View from the Bridge	Mr Alfieri	University of Melbourne
1957	Speak of the Devil		University of Melbourne
1958	The Making of Moo	Frederick Compton	University of Melbourne
1958	A Hatful of Rain	John Pope Snr	University of Melbourne
1958	The Threepenny Opera	Peachum	University of Melbourne
1958	The Ballad of Angel's Alley	Nobbler	New Theatre, Melbourne
1961	The Sentimental Bloke	Ginger Mick	Melbourne
1961	The One Day of the Year	Alf Cook	Russell Street Theatre, Devonport Town Hall, Theatre Royal, Hobart, Burnie, National Theatre, Launceston
1962	Summer of the Seventeenth Doll		Russell Street Theatre
1966	The First Country		Emerald Hill Theatre
1973	A Celebration of the Life and Vision of Pierre Teilhard de Chardin		Dallas Brooks Hall
1979	Cymbeline	Cymbeline	ABC Radio, Melbourne
1984	The Cherry Orchard		The Mill Theatre, Melbourne
