= Uneasy Paradise =

- Ad in The Age 26 Jun 1963
- Written by: Laurence Collinson
- Directed by: William Sterling
- Country of origin: Australia
- Original language: English

Production
- Running time: 60 mins
- Production company: ABC

Original release
- Release: 26 June 1963 (Melbourne)
- Release: 3 July 1963 (Sydney)

Uneasy Paradise is a 1963 Australian television film directed by William Sterling. It is a 60-minute drama set in Melbourne about a gambler married to Sally. He loses much money at a club run by Paolo.

Australian drama was relatively rare at the time.

== Premise ==
Neville is a gambler married to Sally. He loses much money at a club run by Paolo.

== Cast ==
- Peter Aanensen as Neville
- Terri Aldred as Sally
- Syd Conabere as Billy
- Edward Howell as Paolo
- Jules Caffari as Gambler
- James Lynch
- Douglas Kelly
- Ian Boyce
- Roly Barlee
- Ron Pinnell
- Stewart Weller
- Lewis Tegart
- Ray Angel

== Production ==
The show was written by Melbourne writer Laurence Collinson. It was based on a true story and was written as part of a challenge by Sterling at a UNESCO conference in Adelaide. William Sterling decided to treat the subject matter "neo-realistically".

== Reception ==
The Sydney Morning Herald wrote that the plot "carried a spell of authenticity which was broken only by a contrived and comfortable ending" in which Sterling's production "exploited camera angles and action scenes vividly enough to make the-television medium, seem eminently suitable for an effective if somewhat sordid play that took all the tricks except the final, one of a satisfactory, ending."

The Age criticised the writing saying, "every development could be telegraphed."

== See also ==
- List of live television plays broadcast on ABC (1956–1969)
