= Don Crosby =

Australian actor (1924–1985)

- Born: George Wallace Donald Crosby; 29 October 1924; Sydney, New South Wales, Australia
- Died: 3 December 1985 (aged 61); Potts Point, New South Wales, Australia
- Education: Royal Academy of Dramatic Art, London
- Occupations: Actor, radio producer
- Partner: Elizabeth Teresa Betty Glover
- Children: 4
- Parent(s): Joseph Alexander (Marshall) Crosby and Teresa King

George Wallace Donald Crosby, OAM (29 October 1924 – 3 December 1985) was an Australian actor of radio, stage, television and film, radio producer, stage manager, airman and trade unionist.

== Early life ==
Crosby was the fifth child of actor and singer Joseph Alexander "Marshall" Crosby and Theresa Crosby (formerly King), George Wallace Donald Crosby was named after his father's friend, actor and comedian George Stevenson Wallace. At the age of one, he was taken on stage by his father in a production of the operetta His Royal Highness. At age 12, he started producing radio sketches at the ABC.

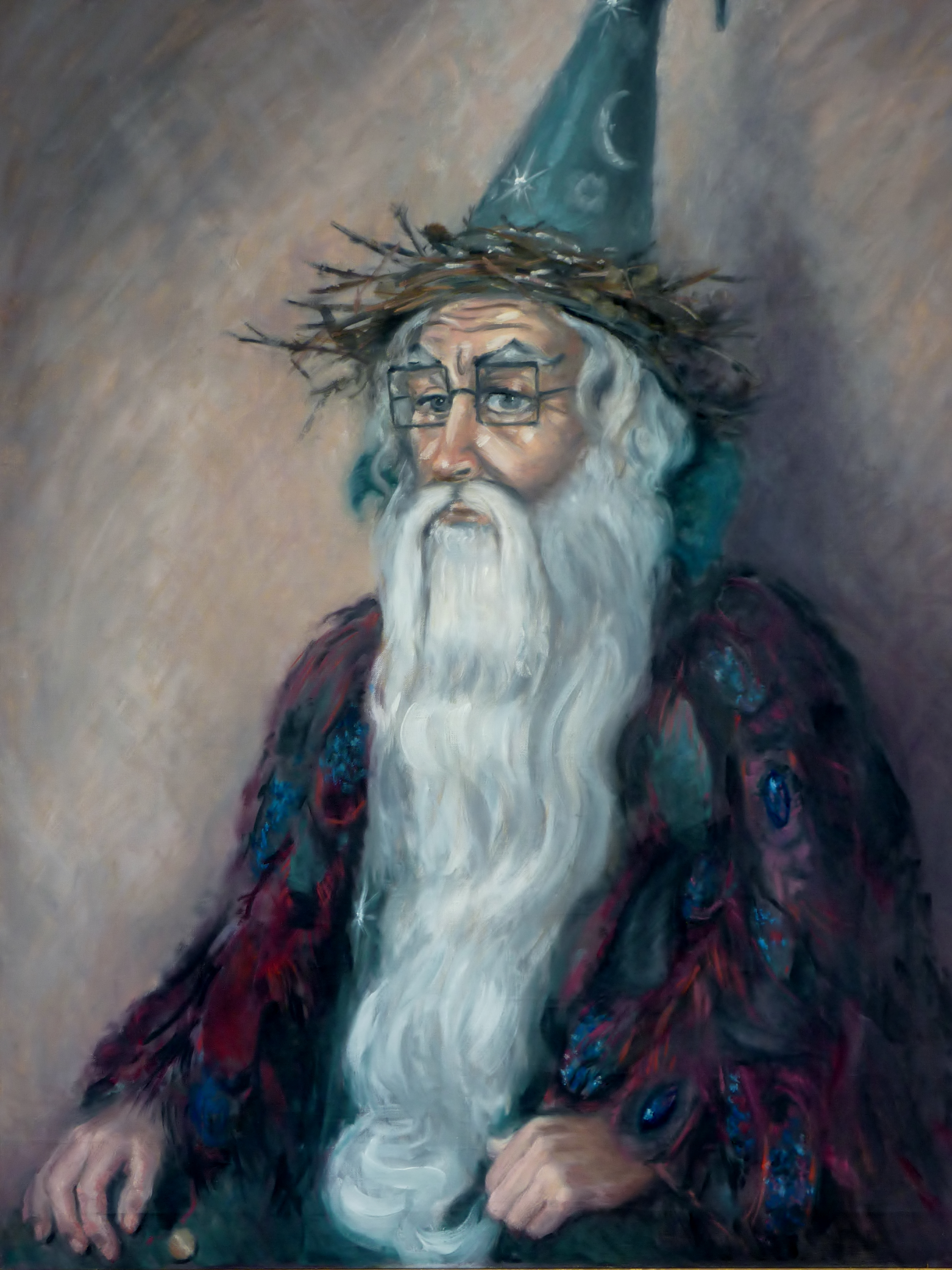
Don Crosby, as Merlin by Douglass Baulch

== Career ==
Crosby started producing radio sketches at the ABC. After leaving school, he continued acting, while working in insurance. After World War II broke out, Crosby served as an air gunner in the Royal Australian Air Force.

In 1945, aged 21, he travelled to London and worked as an assistant stage manager in the West End, when he was offered a scholarship to study at the Royal Academy of Dramatic Art, after which he worked throughout England in repertory. In 1949 he returned to Sydney. He appeared in Doris Fitton's production of Dark of the Moon, and numerous other productions in Sydney and Melbourne. Entering radio in 1949, he had a successful career not only as an actor but also as a producer.

When television arrived in Australia in 1956, he easily made the transition to the new medium, featuring in plays, again at the ABC. According to Richard Lane:

For all his success on stage, it was on television and later in film that his greatness in developing characterisation was fully revealed. His was a craggy face that could sometimes be humorous, often grim or judicial, but always sensitive.

His craggy features, often saw him compared to Sir John Mills.

Crosby moved to commercial television, appearing in serials made by Crawford Productions, such as Ryan, Division 4, Matlock Police and Homicide. In 1968, he played the role of Mervyn in Tony Hancock's doomed Australian series, which was shelved upon Hancock's suicide and later released as a TV movie in 1972. His later television work included roles in The Young Doctors and A Country Practice.

In radio, another popular role was in the long-running Gwen Meredith drama serial Blue Hills. More stage roles followed and Crosby was celebrated for his appearances in works by Steele Rudd. In film, his credits include Newsfront, Little Boy Lost, The Picture Show Man and the indigenous rights film The Chant of Jimmie Blacksmith.

Crosby was one of Australia's most distinguished actors and radio producers, with a career spanning all genres including stage, film, radio and television. He urged the use of Australian actors where possible and spoke out against cuts in ABC funding. In 1980, he was awarded an OAM, and in 1985 he received the Australian Film Institute's Longford Lyell Award for services to the industry.

Crosby served for a time as the President of The Actors' Benevolent Fund of NSW, a charity assisting performers and entertainers in times of dire circumstance. In 1975, Crosby facilitated a donation of $500 from the Benevolent Fund of NSW, to seed a new charity of a similar kind in Queensland. This group became The Actors & Entertainers Benevolent Fund of Queensland, and was founded by Alan Edwards. He was a trade unionist and was president of Actors Equity of Australia from 1976 until his death.

== Personal life ==
Crosby met fellow actress, Elizabeth Teresa Glover in London in 1947, while he was studying at the Royal Academy of Dramatic Art. They were married at Holy Cross Catholic Church, in Woollahra, Sydney. They appeared together in Crawford Productions police dramas of the 1960s and 1970s.

He had three sons (who are also in the industry as actors and film directors) and a daughter. Don's son Matthew Crosby appeared in 1972 series A Drop in the Ocean.

== Death ==
Crosby died at age 61 from a myocardial infarction in 1985 in the Sydney suburb of Potts Point. He was survived by his wife and three children.

== Awards ==
Year	Work	Award	Category	Result
1978	Newsfront	Australian Film Institute Awards	Best Supporting Actor	Nominated
1978	The Chant of Jimmie Blacksmith	Australian Film Institute Awards	Best Supporting Actor	Nominated
1980	Don Crosby	Order of Australia Medal	Services to the media and to theatre	Honoured
1985	Don Crosby	Australian Film Institute Awards	Raymond Longford Award	Won

== Filmography ==
=== Film ===
Year	Title	Role	Type
1974	Moving On		
1976	The Fourth Wish	Priest	
1977	The Picture Show Man	Major Lockhart	
1978	The Chant of Jimmie Blacksmith	Jack Newby	
1978	Newsfront	A.G. Marwood	
1978	Little Boy Lost	Cyril Grills	
1982	Heatwave	Jim Taylor	
1985	A Street to Die	Deputy President of Commission	

=== Television ===
Year	Title	Role	Type
1957	Shadow of Doubt	Dr Arthur Ross	TV play
1958	Murder Story	Warden Graves	TV play
1959	The Strong Are Lonely		TV play
1959	Bodgie	Police inspector	TV play
1959	Crime Passionel	Georges	TV play
1959–1960	Shell Presents	Barman / Corporal	2 episodes
1960	Seagulls Over Sorrento	AB Hudson	TV play
1960	Uncle Martino	Martino	TV play
1961	The Big Deal	Herbie Schiff	TV play
1961	The Ides of March	Cassius	TV play
1961	The End Begins	Hugh Pakenham	TV play
1961	Shadow of Heroes	János Kádár	TV play
1962	The Devil Makes Sunday	Dr. McCombie	TV play
1962	The Music Upstairs		TV play
1962	Freddo the Frog	Kanga (voice)	Animated series
1962–1964	Consider Your Verdict	Michael Nelson	2 episodes
1964	Othello	Duke of Vince	TV play
1965–1975	Homicide	Film Truck Driver / Paul Campbell / Tait / George Harris / Joe Kosenko / James Nelson	6 episodes
1966	Australian Playhouse	Carter / Mr Bigelow / Mr. Fletcher	3 episodes
1966	The Man Who Saw It	Smithy	TV play
1967	Nice 'n Juicy	Mr. Mollis	1 episode
1967	Something Else		
1967	Love and War	Plonko	Miniseries, 2 episodes
1967–1968	Contrabandits	Eddie Miller / Glover	2 episodes
1968	Skippy the Bush Kangaroo	Snapes	1 episode
1968–1969	Hunter	Lang / Mick Jackson	2 episodes
1969–1970	Australian Plays	Jack	2 episodes
1970	The Link Men		1 episode
1970	The Rovers	Mr. Newton	1 episode
1970	The Long Arm	Harry Moss	1 episode
1970–1973	Division 4	Mr. Perkins / Stan Wilson	2 episodes
1971	Dead Men Running		Miniseries, 1 episode
1971	Barrier Reef	Dave McPhie	1 episode
1971	Spyforce	Professor Maurice Trilby	1 episode
1971–1975	Matlock Police	Frank White / George Bailey / Jim Grimes / Hamish McKenzie / Tom Baxter / Harry Burke	6 episodes
1972	The Tony Hancock Special	Mervyn	TV movie
1972	Lane End	Sergeant Woods	Miniseries
1972	The Spoiler	White	2 episodes
1973	Ryan		TV series
1974	Escape from Singapore	General Gordon Bennett	TV documentary film
1974	Behind the Legend	Protector of Aboriginies	1 episode
1974	Billy and Percy		TV docudrama film
1974–1975	Certain Women		5 episodes
1975	They Don't Clap Losers	Magistrate	TV docudrama film
1976	Shannon's Mob		1 episode
1976	Stories Round the World	Bert Hammond	1 episode
1976	Luke's Kingdom	Dr. Harty	Miniseries, 1 episode
1976	Bellbird		1 episode
1978	Chopper Squad	Police Radio Operator	1 episode
1978–1980	Cop Shop	Speed / Tom 'Banjo' Patterson	3 episodes
1979	Ride on Stranger	George Benson	Miniseries, 2 episodes
1979–1981	Skyways	Vincenzo Fanelli	1 episode
1980–1981	The Young Doctors	Harry Norman	2 episodes
1981	Bellamy	Landlord	Miniseries, 1 episode
1981–1982	The Restless Years	Rex Williams	2 episodes
1982	Spring & Fall	Harry	1 episode
1982	Holiday Island	Yin Ma	2 episodes
1982–1985	A Country Practice	Arnie Griffiths / George Prentice / Jock	TV series, 6 episodes
1983	The Dismissal		Miniseries, 1 episode
1984	Five Mile Creek	Doctor	1 episode
1984	The Last Bastion	Arthur Coles	Miniseries, 3 episodes

== Stage ==
Year	Title	Role	Type
1925	His Royal Highness		Perth
1950	Dark of the Moon		Sydney / Melbourne
1951	The Playboy of the Western World	Christy	Little Theatre, Melbourne
1953	Seagulls over Sorrento	AB Hudson	Australian tour with J. C. Williamson's
1965	Camelot	Merlin	Her Majesty's Theatre, Adelaide, Her Majesty's Theatre, Brisbane with J. C. Williamson's
1971	The Removalists	Sergeant Simmonds	La Mama Theatre, Melbourne
1979–1980	On Our Selection	Joseph Murtagh Rudd (Dad)	Nimrod Theatre, Sydney

== Radio ==
Year	Title	Role	Type
	Blue Hills	Josh Roberts (also producer)	Gwen Meredith drama serial
	Crime Five	The Inspector	Serial
	Oliver Twist		Serial
	The Passionate Years		Serial
	Adopted Son	Mr Wainright	Serial
