= Never Say Die (TV series) =

British television series

Never Say Die is a British television series, which aired in 1970. Cast included Reginald Marsh, Patrick Newell, Noel Purcell, Teddy Green, Larry Noble, Wilfrid Brambell, Ken Parry, Mary Healey and Hugh Walters. It was a comedy produced by Yorkshire Television. Of the six episodes produced, 2 are missing from the archives.
