= The Lady from the Sea (1961 film) =

- Ad from The Age 4 Oct 1961
- Based on: 1888 play by Norwegian playwright Henrik Ibsen
- Directed by: William Sterling
- Country of origin: Australia
- Original language: English

Production
- Running time: 75 mins
- Production company: ABC

Original release
- Network: ABC
- Release: 4 October 1961 (Melbourne, live)
- Release: 17 January 1962 (Sydney, taped)

The Lady from the Sea is a 1961 drama one-off presented on Australian broadcaster ABC. An adaptation of 1888 play by Norwegian playwright Henrik Ibsen, it went for 75 minutes and was telecast live on 4 October 1961 in Melbourne, and was recorded for showing in Sydney (it is not known if it was also shown on ABC's stations in Adelaide, Brisbane and Perth).

Per a search of their website, the National Archives may hold a copy, with running time listed as 1:23:12.

Australian TV drama was relatively rare at the time.

== Plot ==
A young woman, Eldsa, is married but still carries a torch for a former lover, who she believes is drowned. The husband believes another man was also his wife's former lover. A young consumptive man seems to be interested in the wife, but actually wants her daughter. The former lover emerges from the sea.

== Cast ==
- Lynne Flanagan as Eldsa
- Edward Howell as Dr Wangel
- Carole Potter as Bolette
- Eva Freitag as Hilde
- Roland Redshaw as Arnholm
- David Mitchell as Lyngstrand
- Wynn Roberts as the stranger
- Campbell Copelin as Ballested
- Nancy Cato
- Edward Brayshaw

== Production ==
The play had been performed on Australian radio in February 1959.

It was the first TV production for Lynne Flanagan and 14 year old Eva Freitag.

== Reception ==
The Australian Woman's Weekly TV critic said "The whole thing really had to be seen to be believed. There was so much talk of the sea, people drowning, so much trick photography that didn't come off, that I ended up feeling like a sea creature myself."
