= Singles (miniseries) =

- Written by: Robert Caswell; Linda Aaronson; Michael Aitkens; Alma De Groen; Anne Brooksbank
- Directed by: David Goldie; Ted Robinson; Graham Thorburn; Helene Harris; Ric Pellizerri
- Starring: Elizabeth Alexander; Barry Otto; Robert Coleby; Richard Moir
- Country of origin: Australia
- Original language: English

Production
- Producer: Martin Williams
- Production company: ABC

Original release
- Release: 14 August – 11 September 1984

Singles is a 1984 Australian miniseries about a 30 something woman having a series of relationships with men. It consists of five self-contained plays.

The Sun Herald said Elizabeth Alexander gives "a fine fraught performance".

== Premise ==
Sydney doctor Alison ends a seven year relationship. The series spans 18 months and consists of five plays dealing with five different men.

== Cast ==
- Elizabeth Alexander as Alison Kirk
- Barry Otto as Peter
- Robert Coleby as Jack Howard
- Richard Moir as Stefan
- Melissa Jaffer as Gloria
- Francis Yin as Andrew Lu
- Phillip Ross as Pat
- Susan Leith as Jeanette
- Dinah Shearing as Allison's mother
- David Downer as Farrell
- Julie Hamilton
- Dennis Miller as Des
- Steven Jacobs as Chris

== Episodes ==
- Ep one (14 August 1984) - w Robert Caswell, d Ted Robinson - Allison breaks up with Farrell, and she enrols in a singles agency and meets eter
- Ep two (21 August 1984) - w Michael Aitkens d Ric Pellizzeri - Allison meets Jack Howard a charming businessman
- Ep three (28 August 1984) - d Graham Thorburn - Allison is matched with an industrial chemist from Poland called Stefan
- Ep four (4 September 1984)
- Ep five (11 September 1984) - Allison dates Rob, a boat designer. She decides to study acupuncture n China.
