= Hedda Gabler (1961 film) =

- Genre: drama
- Based on: play Hedda Gabler by Henrik Ibsen
- Written by: Richard Lane
- Directed by: William Sterling
- Country of origin: Australia
- Original language: English

Production
- Running time: 90 minutes
- Production company: ABC

Original release
- Network: ABC
- Release: 11 January 1961 (Melbourne)
- Release: 5 April 1961 (Sydney)
- Release: 13 November 1961 (Brisbane)

Hedda Gabler is a 1961 Australian television play based on the 1891 play by Henrik Ibsen.

== Plot ==
Hedda Gabler pursues the destruction of a former lover.

== Cast ==
- June Brunell as Hedda
- Richard Davies as George Tesman
- Edward Howel as Brack
- Wynn Roberts as Eilert Lovborg
- Dorothy Bradley as Bertha
- Moira Carleton as Julia Tesman
- Pat Connolly as Thea Elvsted

== Production ==
Brunell's casting was announced in November 1960. Wendy Pomroy recorded the music.

== Reception ==
The Age said the production "had excellent sets and dressing, fine technical presentation and the assistance of a strong cast", but felt Brunell "interpreted Hedda in too 'genteel' a fashion."

The critic for the Sydney Morning Herald wrote that the play suffered from "adequate rather than generous acting" except for June Brunell in the lead, who was praised. The Age TV critic felt Brunell was "too genteel" in the lead but thought the production had "excellent sets and dressing".

Richard Lane, who did the adaptation, said that Edward Howell as "chilling" as Brack, "it was a character that suited him perfectly."
