= Swamp Creatures =

1957 stage play by Alan Seymour

- Original language: English
- Written by: Alan Seymour
- Characters: Constance; Amy; Christian; Mr Fall; Mrs Fall
- Genre: drama
- Setting: A derelict house in a swamp

Premiere
- Date: 1 November 1957
- Place: Riverside Theatre, Canberra

Swamp Creatures is a 1957 stage play by the Australian author Alan Seymour. He later adapted it for radio and TV. It was Seymour's first produced play.

== Plot ==
Two sisters live together in the Australian bush, the dominant Constance and the frail Amy. Amy's son Christian returns after having disappeared when he was in his teens.

== Background ==
The play was written in 1955–56. Seymour was inspired to write it reading about two sisters who lived near Bacchus Marsh, one of whom had disappeared. He also read about a pet dog that disappeared in a swamp. Seymour later said he "was interested in all the atom bomb talk at that time, and the suggestions that radio-activity would produce curious mutations. I set out, from the ideas these things gave me to write a play which would give audiences an exciting theatrical experience even if they didn't get any deeper message.” Seymour claims this message was "that the scientific world is creating monsters to destroy itself."

In 1956 Swamp Creatures was highly commended in a competition for the best new Australian play held by the Journalists' Club and judged by the Playwrights' Advisory Board. (This competition was won by The Shifting Heart with The Multi Coloured Umbrella coming second.)

In 1957 Swamp Creatures was one of the twenty-five finalists in the play competition held by the London Observer.

The play was first performed by the Canberra Repertory Society in 1957 in a production sponsored by the Elizabethan Theatre Trust.

Reviewing this production Lindsey Browne of the Sydney Morning Herald wrote play "packs more horrible fancies into four scenes than in any other horror show in recent memory... The Work is certainly original but one could feel surer that this kind of originality was worth achieving if Mr Seymour thought a little more of developing a story and was less ready to allow one almost unvarying mood and one basic situation to spin on and on through four scenes. He excites curiosity; he does not grip the imagination."

Browne later wrote a profile on Seymour where he called Swamp Creatures a "nightmare play in the mood of slimy macabre" in which "there is a distinction of vision and writing for all of his failure to give taut order, meaning and design to horribleness. A man needs to be obsessed with the play- writing urge to bring forth work like Alan Seymour's Swamp Creatures. The play is his own need, and he fulfils it. Obses-sion is too scarce a thing in all Australian art. I wish I had said so in print at the time of the premiere performance... but a daily paper critic, as I was then, is often a man in too much of a hurry to be able to record the impressions of leisure." Filmink argued that by this "time Seymour had moved to England, so it was kind of a useless mea culpa, whereas a strong Herald review in 1957 would have really helped the play’s commercial prospects."

=== Cast of original production ===
- Joyce Goodes as Constance
- Barbara Shanahan as Amy
- Michael Dennis as Christian
- Harry Schmidt as Mr Fall
- Daphne Curtis as Mrs Fall

=== Other productions ===
The play was presented at the 1959 Country Drama Festival where it won an award for the best production of an Australian play at the festival.

It was given a production at Turner Hall, Sydney Technical College, in September 1960. Reviewing this the Sydney Morning Herald wrote "the play gives promise of true dramatic maturity".

== Critical reception ==
Alrene Sykes, academic, called the play "a slow, highly theatrical revelation of horrors, but there is also, very clearly, a message embedded in its unmistakable symbolism. The play was written when Australians were still at the beginning of their awareness that science might indeed have got out of hand, and could turn and rend its maker."

Geoffrey Dutton wrote, "The play retains some interest as a product of the cold war period of the fifties, compounding fear by postulating that science could control life. "

Leslie Rees, in his history of Australian playwriting, called the play:

A hauntingly explorative drama with two separate compulsions—one as a bald but nightmarish thriller, the other as a symbol-drama warning with slow driving force against the impact of bizarrely experimental modern science on normal emotions, behaviour, and happiness... the play had a true theatrical interest in developing macabre situations and a slow-creeping miasma of fear. But the reality of Seymour’s social and cautionary meaning went deeper, even though at times one felt the parallels were not fully worked out. For its time it was an ugly play, not likely to be “enjoyed” by general audiences, but one to win the respect of limited audiences as a modern morality. Undoubtedly one felt that a dramatist of power was at work.

== 1960 TV adaptation ==
Swamp Creatures
- Genre: drama
- Based on: play by Alan Seymour
- Written by: Alan Seymour
- Starring: Jacqueline Knott
- Country of origin: Australia
- Original language: English

Production
- Running time: 75 mins
- Production company: ABC

Original release
- Network: ABV-2 (Melbourne)
- Release: 13 July 1960 (Sydney, live)
- Release: 1 August 1960 (Brisbane)
- Release: 19 October 1960 (Melbourne, taped)

The play was filmed for TV by the ABC in 1960. It has been argued this was done after the ABC refused to film Seymour's original TV script, Lean Liberty.

The play was repeated on TV in 1962.

=== Cast ===
- Jacqueline Kott as Caroline
- Lynne Murphy as Amy
- Graham Hill as Christian
- Marion Johns as Mrs Fall
- Frank Walters as Mr Fall

=== Production ===
In September 1959 it was announced that the ABC had created a TV Writers Pool, with the aim of teaching local writers the techniques of learning for the screen. There were ten initial members: Alan Seymour, Jeff Underhill, Richard Lane, Barbara Vernon, D'arcy Niland and Ruth Park, Gwen Meredith, Kay Keaveny, Peter Kenna and Coral Lansbury.

Early Australian TV drama production was dominated by using imported scripts but in 1960 the ABC was undertaking what has been described as "an Australiana drive" of producing local stories. Swamp Creatures was one in a series of ten plays made by the ABC in 1960 using local writers, others including The Astronauts and The Slaughter of St Teresa's Day

Floor assistant David Twiby recalled that during the making of Swamp Creatures, the smoke machine caused a stage hand to nearly die during the broadcast.

=== Reception ===
Reviews for the production were very strong. Val Marshall, the Sunday Sydney Morning Herald TV critic called it "one of the finest drama efforts I have seen done here. Both from a technical and acting point of view, it couldn't be faulted... it gripped the interest from the first sequence. A scene where the two demented sisters stage a dream party in the near empty house was a brilliant piece of work."

Another Herald critic said the production "was at least successful in showing how a handful of characters can be marshalled to produce gripping theatre" but thought "the central issues are somewhat cloudily expressed. It is as if Seymour, having bunched these characters in a relatively surreal situation, is content to pile shock on shock at the expense of fully developing the main thread: that humanism rather than science is the answer"

No known copy of this play survives although the script does.

== Other adaptation ==
The play was adapted for radio by the ABC several times.

The play was intended to be adapted as a feature film by Kevin Powell and Anthony Buckley Productions but no film resulted.

== See also ==
- List of television plays broadcast on Australian Broadcasting Corporation (1960s)
