= Murder in the Cathedral (1962 film) =

- Ad in The Age 8 Aug 1962
- Directed by: William Sterling
- Country of origin: Australia
- Original language: English

Production
- Running time: 8 August 1962 (Melbourne)
- Production company: ABC

Murder in the Cathedral is a 1962 Australian television play adapted from T. S. Eliot's 1935 play Murder in the Cathedral, about Thomas Becket. It was one of a number of verse plays produced by the ABC.

William Sterling said he wanted to adapt it for TV for a long time. Australian TV drama was relatively rare at the time.

== Cast ==
- Wynn Roberts as Beckett
- Madeleine Howell
- Kevin McBeath
- Alan Tobin
- Edward Brayshaw
- Marcia Hart
- Carole Potter

== Reception ==
The critic for the Sydney Morning Herald though the production "went closer to justifying its two hours traffic... than anyone had a right to expect."

The Bulletin praised the acting but did not think the play was adapted particularly well for television.

Filmink magazine said "It is beautifully shot with wonderful design though at two hours, it’s not an easy watch. Two hours of plot-light verse drama, all in the one set. Two. Hours. Cripes. Different time."
