= Phillip Ross =

Australian-born actor (1929–2025)

- Born: 19 July 1929; Perth, Australia
- Died: 9 June 2025 (aged 95); Ballina, Australia
- Occupation: Actor
- Years active: 1960–2000
- Spouse: Felicity Pull (stage name Felicity Gordon) (m. 1964)

Phillip Adrian Ross (19 July 1929 – 9 June 2025) was an Australian-born television actor. He appeared in many British and Australian television series and films between 1960 and 2000, which include No Hiding Place, The Avengers, Z-Cars, The Private Life of Sherlock Holmes, S*P*Y*S, Prisoner, Return to Eden, A Country Practice and others.

== Acting credits ==
Production	Notes	Role
Farewell, Farewell, Eugene	TV Movie (1960)	
Whiplash	"Convict Town" (1961); "Barbed Wire" (1961); "Dutchman's Reef" (1961); "The Hunters" (1961)	Mathews; Pierce; Kelly; Len Dillon
Consider Your Verdict	"Queen Versus Glandon" (1962)	Roy Glandon
The Marked One	Film (1963)	Tom
No Hiding Place	"Requiem on a Typewriter" (1963)	Plain clothes policeman
Crossroads	Unknown episode (1964)	Jacques Duclos
Dixon of Dock Green	"Windfall" (1964); "The World of Silence" (1966); "The Collectors" (1967); "Ania" (1968); "Shadows" (1970); "The Fingerman" (1972)	Vicar; Painter; Waiter; Garage Attendant; Foreman; Bridges
The Valiant Varneys	1 episode (1965)	Unknown
The Avengers	"The Fear Merchants" (1967)	Hospital Attendant
Great Expectations	"Confidences Exchanged" (1967); "Estella's Father" (1967)	Petitioner; Waiter
Les Misérables	"Buried Treasure" (1967)	Usher
Poor Cow	Film (1967)	Shelley
Detective	"Cork on the Water" (1968)	The Watcher
The Wednesday Play	"The Big Flame" (1969)	Inspector
The File of the Golden Goose	Film (1969)	Carter
Z-Cars	2 episodes: " No Time to Think" (1969)	Harrison
Softly, Softly: Task Force	"Diversion" (1969)	Insp. Reid
Strange Report	"Report 1553: Racist – A Most Dangerous Proposal" (1969)	Canon Lewis
ITV Sunday Night Theatre	"Bangelstein's Boys" (1969); "Every Day of the Life Man" (1969); "When Johnny Comes Marching Home" (1970)	Police Sergeant; Sergeant; Man
The Private Life of Sherlock Holmes	Film (1970)	McKellar
La última señora Anderson	Film (1971)	
The Onedin Line	"When My Ship Comes In" (1971)	Captain Goody
Danny Jones	Film (1972)	Mr. Harper
Frenzy	Film (1972)	Policeman
Pope Joan	Film (1972)	Peasant
The Adventures of Black Beauty	"Out of the Night" (1973)	Jessop
Class of '74	Unknown episodes	David Willard (1974); Grimble (1975)
S*P*Y*S	Film (1974)	KGB Agent
Silent Number	"Judas" (1974); "Bang, Bang, You're Dead" (1974)	Unknown; Smith
Two Way Mirror	Film (1975)	Jimmy Maxwell
Sunday Too Far Away	Film (1975)	Dawson
Ride a Wild Pony	Film (1975)	
Armchair Theatre	"Tully" (1975)	Inspector Young
Matlock Police	"Forget Me Not" (1975); "Judgement Day" (1976)	George Donovan; Bill Grant
Luke's Kingdom	"The Prisoner" (1976)	Doggett
Mad Dog Morgan	Film (1976)	Watson
The Box	1 episode (1976)	Walter Freeman
Let the Balloon Go	Film (1976)	Goff Vockler
Pig in a Poke	Unknown episode (1977)	
Spring & Fall	"Winner" (1980)	
Prisoner	1 episode (1981)	Workman
Airhawk	TV Movie (1981)	Bob Fenton
Bellamy	"A Nice Girl Like You" (1981)	Owen
NBC Special Treat	"Oh, Boy! Babies!" (1982)	Philip
It's a Living	Short Film (1983)	Passenger
Scales of Justice	"The Job" (1983)	Boarding House Mgr
Singles	5 episodes (1984)	Pat
Undercover	Film (1984)	Mason
Stock Squad	TV Movie (1985)	
Return to Eden	1 episode (1986)	Flying doctor
Rikky and Pete	Film (1988)	Barracks Man
A Country Practice	"Seeing the Light: Part 2" (1988)	Reg Farrell
Home and Away	8 episodes (1988–90)	Reverend Flowers
G.P.	"A Minor Complaint" (1993)	Mr. Lucas
Soldier Soldier	"Ill Wind" (1995)	Andy Miller
Married 2 Malcolm	Film (2000)	Old Man
