= Rita (1959 film) =

- Directed by: Alan Burke
- Starring: Rosalind Keene
- Country of origin: Australia
- Original language: English

Production
- Running time: 60 minutes

Original release
- Release: 3 September 1959

Rita is a 1959 Australian television play starring Rosalind Keene. It is a recording of an opera by Donizetti.

== Cast ==
- Joe Jenkins
- Rosalind Keene as Rita
- Ereach Riley as Beppo
- Russell Smith as Gasparo

== See also ==
- List of live television plays broadcast on Australian Broadcasting Corporation (1950s)
