= The Big Deal (film) =

1962 film by William Sterling

- Advertisement from The Age 29 Nov 1961
- Written by: Charles Cohen
- Directed by: William Sterling
- Starring: Don Crosby
- Country of origin: Australia
- Original language: English

Production
- Running time: 60 mins

Original release
- Network: ABC
- Release: 29 November 1961 (Melbourne)
- Release: 9 May 1962 (Sydney)
- Release: 5 March 1963 (Brisbane)

The Big Deal is a 1961 Australian TV play. Australian TV drama was relatively rare at the time.

== Plot ==
Herbie, a despatch worker at a plastics factory, dreams of being a millionaire, but he lacks the killer instinct. His friend Julian dreams of creating novelties from plastic.

== Cast ==
- Donald Crosby as Herbie Schiff
- Marie Renshaw as Lillian
- Edward Howell as Solly Parness
- Kenneth Goodlet as Julian Ring
- Morton Smith as Al Konits
- Diana Bell as Ginger
- Brenda Beddison as Claire
- Keith Hudon as Ralph
- Roland Renshaw
- Campbell Copelin
- Carole Potter
- Nancy Cato
- James Lynch

== Production ==
The play had been broadcast in London and New York but this was its first production in Australia. Brenda Beddison and Morton Smith made their debuts in "live" drama. Eight studio sets were constructed by Kevin Bartlett.

== Reception ==
The critic from the Sydney Morning Herald thought the play was "neither comical, subtle, ironic, nor in fact even, remotely entertaining" having "no plot worthy of the name, and its theme, tenuous to say the least, gained nothing from the hourlong treatment" with "dialogue of unrelieved stodginess, produced without imagination, dramatic sense or photographic skill."
