= The Forbidden Rite =

- Directed by: William Sterling
- Country of origin: Australia
- Original language: English

Production
- Running time: 45 minutes
- Production company: ABC

Original release
- Release: 17 July 1962 (Sydney)

The Forbidden Rite is a 1962 Australian television play. It is a filmed ballet - the first ballet written in Australia exclusively for TV. The ABC did regularly broadcast ballet at the time.

It was a joint effort of producer, choreographer Rex Reid and composer Robert Hughes.

== Plot ==
On a Mediterranean island, a tourist party inspects the ruins of a shrine built for the goddess of love.

== Cast ==
- Mary Duchensne as an English tourist
- Victoria Biro as a village lass
- Edward Miller as a village lad
- Ron Paul as a tourist guide
- Alida Glasbeck
- Patrina Coates
- Laurence Bishop
- Barry Moreland

== Production ==
The Forbidden Rite was composed by Robert Hughes, a music writer and arranger for the Victorian Symphony Orchestra. It is the first work commissioned for the Alfred Hill Memorial Award. The ballet was choreographed by Rex Reid.

== Reception ==
The Sydney Morning Herald called The Forbidden Rite "a triple success for composer Robert Hughes, producer William Sterling and choreographer Rex Reid" praising its "beautifully stylised sets and cameras working with machine-like precision."

The Bulletin said it "had its moments". The Age gave a mixed review.
