= Teddy Green =

English actor, choreographer and dancer

- Born: 1945 (age 80–81)
- Occupations: Actor; choreographer; dancer
- Years active: 1956-

Teddy Green is an English actor, choreographer, and dancer probably best known for playing supporting roles in two Cliff Richard films, The Young Ones and Summer Holiday.

== Career ==
His film roles include Chris in The Young Ones with Cliff Richard (1961), Steve in Summer Holiday, again with Cliff Richard (1963), and Muleteer in Man Of La Mancha (1972). He also became a choreographer and performed in the West End stage musical Pickwick with Harry Secombe in 1963, and in the 1960s appeared in the Broadway musicals Baker Street and Darling Of The Day (alongside Vincent Price). Green later returned to acting in television, with roles in The Professionals, The Bretts, and Holby City. He also appeared on BBC TV 's long running variety show The Good Old Days.

== Selected Stage Work ==
- The Pajama Game, 1955, London
- When in Rome 1959-60, Adelphi Theatre, London
- Pickwick 1963, Saville Theatre, West End
- Baker Street (Wiggins) 1965, The Broadway Theatre, Martin Beck Theatre, Broadway
- Green Room Rags, 1966-7, Adelphi Theatre, London
- Darling Of The Day (Alf) 1968, George Abbott Theatre, Broadway
- For Better For Worse, (Tony) (1968) Queen's Theatre, Hornchurch
- And All That Jazz (choreographer and performer) 1968, Queen's Theatre, Hornchurch
- Kiss Me Kate (Bill Calhoun/Lucentio), 1970, London Coliseum, London
- The Taming of the Shrew, 1970-1, Theatre Royal, Bath
- Trelawny 1972, Sadler's Wells Theatre, London
- The Taming of the Shrew, 1972-3, Little Theatre, Bristol
- No, No, Nanette, (Billy Early), 1973, Drury Lane Theatre, London
- Rock Nativity, (Gabriel and choreographer) 1974, University Theatre, Newcastle-upon-Tyne
- Mother Goose, (Colin) 1975, Hull New Theatre
- Very Good Eddie, (De Rougemont) 1976, Piccadilly Theatre, West End.
- The Wizard Of Oz, (Director and choreographer), 1983, Congress Theatre (Eastbourne)
- South Pacific (Luther Billis) 1990, Queen's Theatre, Hornchurch
- Sinbad – The Great Adventure (Caliph) 1990, Queen's Theatre, Hornchurch
- Mizpah (Herschel/Johan), 1991, Queen's Theatre, Hornchurch
- The Fifteen Streets (James Llewellyn / Father Bailey) 1994, Queen's Theatre, Hornchurch
- Dick Whittington (choreographer) 1994, Queen's Theatre, Hornchurch
- Hot Shoe Shuffle (performer and director) (1996) Grand Theatre, Wolverhampton
- Promenade, 1998, Off Broadway
- West Side Story (Doc), 1998, Alan Johnson tour
- Noël Coward's Still Life With Red Peppers, (choreographer) 2011, Pentameters Theatre

== Selected filmography ==
- Five Guineas A Week (1956)
- The Young Ones (1961)
- Dixon Of Dock Green (1962)
- Summer Holiday (1962)
- Quick Before They Catch Us (1966)
- Never Say Die (1970)
- Man Of La Mancha (1972)
- The Professionals (1978)
- Sorry! (1986–87)
- The Bretts (1987)
- No Frills (1988)
- Holby City (2006)
