= Alan Burke (director) =

Australian writer, film director and producer (1923–2007)

- Born: 18 November 1923 (Note: The NLA catalog record for the 1988 Burke interview by Bill Stephens gives the dates of Burke's life as 1922-2007, but in the recording, Burke twice says he was born in 1923 (at 0:51 and again at 1:13).); Hawthorn, Melbourne, Victoria, Australia
- Died: 28 August 2007 (aged 83); Sydney, New South Wales, Australia
- Education: University of Melbourne
- Occupations: Writer, director, producer
- Years active: 1939–2003

Alan Burke (18 November 1923 – 28 August 2007) was an Australian writer and film director and producer. His credits include the musical Lola Montez.

== Biography ==
Burke was born in the Hawthorn suburb of Melbourne, Victoria in 1923.

Burke was interested in theatre from a young age and began writing plays. One of them Follow Suit debuted in 1941. According to The Argus "Alan is aged only 17 years, but has been turning out plays so prolifically for the past 4 or 5 years that he must now be reckoned a veteran playwright. Most surprising of all is that there's nothing "youthful" in his writings. Most of his efforts have had all the sophistication and wit of a Coward."

He served in the army from 1941 until 1946. He did a Bachelor of Arts at the University of Melbourne where he was heavily involved in the dramatic society. In 1948 he became a member of the Old Vic Company when they were touring Australia.

He worked with the Melbourne Little Theatre, notably with Frank Thring, and toured Victoria with several shows. He moved to Sydney, where he produced plays for the Metropolitan Theatre and Sydney University.

In December 1951 he was appointed as producer-manager of the Canberra Repertory Society, which he did for two years. Burke went overseas for three years on a UNESCO fellowship, in England, Europe and the United States. On his travels he met Thornton Wilder.

In 1954 in England in attended a two-month BBC television training course run by Royston Morley. He directed six plays in England. He returned to Australia in 1956 at the request of Neil Hutchinson to work with the Australian Elizabethan Theatre Trust where he directed eight plays and an opera.

He also wrote the book to a popular musical, Lola Montez.

=== Television ===
In 1957 he directed a TV play for the ABC, A Fourth for Bridge. He formally joined ABC TV in 1958 and as an executive producer and director until 1986. He directed operas, ballet, musicals including his own, original Australian drama and Australian adaptations of overseas drama.

Burke later described his process for directing operas:

What I do first is learn the whole opera. I would get the records of the opera and learn every note and all the dialogue. I would play it, and play it etc. After a while images come into the mind – the way an aria sticks out in an opera and so do certain key moments. Then I work out the crucial scenes. What makes it different to any other opera. Why is this opera the opera it is. The ABC Music Department cast all the operas so I played no part in that. Next was the design. I was allocated a designer. We would work out the costumes and sets and flavour and tone and period. Next is the big job of plotting the opera ie pictures and all the detail. I would leave the office and go home and play the opera for weeks, with the script in front of me. I would work on it plotting bar by bar. Then I passed all that information to the cast. I found most singers very grateful for direction.

He directed a production of Merchant of Venice starring Barry Creyton who later called Burke "a very gentle, erudite man. Very sympathetic – he knew exactly what he wanted from actors and how to get it without ranting and raving; he would coax it out of you."

The team of Lola Montez were commissioned by ATN7 in 1959 to write an original musical for television, Pardon Miss Westcott which was directed by David Cahill. A third musical by the trio, based on Ruth Park's The Harp in the South, has never been performed.

He taught at NIDA and did consultancy for the Australian Film Commission.

In 1980 he won a Sammy Award for directing A Toast to Melba. He returned to directing theatre in 1982 with Errol Flynn's Great Big Adventure Book for Boys.

== Select TV credits ==
- Rita (1959) – director
- Wuthering Heights (1959) - director
- The Slaughter of St Teresa's Day (1960) - director
- The Emperor Jones (1960) – writer & director
- A Little South of Heaven (1961) – director

== Select theatre credits ==
- Follow Suit (1940) – original play written by Burke
- Woman Bites Dog (1944) – play written by Burke
- Over 21 by Ruth Gordon (1947) – directed production at Melbourne University
- Night Must Fall (1947)
- The Father by Stringberg (1948) – director
- Rusty Bugles (1949) – directed at Majestic Theatre, Adelaide
- The Play's the Thing (1950) – with Frank Thring
- The Importance of Being Earnest (1951) – toured a production in Victoria – he directed
- The Man Who Came to Dinner (1951) – with Frank Thring and Pat Hanna at the Melbourne Little Theatre
- Happy as Larry (1951) – produced play at Sydney Metropolitan Theatre
- The Eagle Has Two Heads by Jean Cocteau (1951) – Wallis Theatre
- Venus Observed (1951) – produced this at Arrow Theatre in Melbourne
- Ned Kelly (1952) – directed production in Canberra
- Harlequinade, The Browning Version (1952) – directed production in Canberra
- The Skin of Our Teeth (1953) – directed production in Canberra
- Ring Round the Moon (1953) – directed production in Canberra
- The Government Inspector (1953) – directed production in Canberra
- Hedda Gabbler (1953) – directed Canberra production
- The Seagull (1954) – directed in Geneva
- The Cherry Orchard (1954) – directed in Geneva
- Look Back in Anger (1957) – Australian premiere – with Zoe Caldwell – director
- The Matchmaker – Australian premiere – director
- The Rainmaker – Australian premiere – co-directed with Leo McKern
- Lola Montez – co-author
- Errol Flynn's Great Big Adventure for Boys (1982) – director
