= The Astronauts (film) =

- Advertisement in The Age 18 May 1960
- Written by: Don Houghton
- Directed by: Christopher Muir
- Country of origin: Australia
- Original language: English

Production
- Running time: 60 minutes
- Production company: ABC

Original release
- Release: 18 May 1960 (Melbourne - live)
- Release: 27 July 1960 (Sydney)

The Astronauts is a television film, or rather a live television play, which aired in Australia during 1960 on ABC. Broadcast originally in Melbourne on 18 May 1960, a kinescope recording was made of the broadcast and shown in Sydney on 27 July 1960 (it is not known if it was also shown on ABC's stations in Brisbane, Adelaide and Perth). FilmInk magazine said it may be the only Australian drama about the space race and "the first (to my knowledge) locally written Australian sci-fi drama for the small screen."

== Plot ==
Four men (two Americans, an Englishman and an Australian) are training in Australia to become astronauts, and are preparing for the first manned space launch, for which only one of the men will be selected.

Medical officers think the men are mentally and physically perfect. However, one of them has a physical defect.

== Cast ==
- Alan Hopgood as Dave Armstrong, the Australian astronaut
- David Mitchell as Len Cassidy
- Mark Kelly as Jeff Burrows
- Tony Brown as Flight Lieutenant Peter Corbitt, the English astronaut
- Keith Eden as Dr. Vaughan
- Kurt Ludescher as a German scientist
- Kendrick Hudson as a U.S. Air Force general
- Marie Redshaw as Jill Corbitt, Peter's wife
- Anne Harvey as Del Armstrong, Dave's wife
- Collins Hilton as a steward

== Production ==
Don Houghton, a Sydney writer, was prompted to write the drama after the announcement of the Mercury Seven. Houghton said "For the sake of the play I hope any attempt to put a man in space will not be made before May 18," when the show was being broadcast. He wrote the play in late 1959 and was worried "that my play will become a piece of history first -not a projection of the future as it is now." It was bought by the Canadian Broadcasting Corporation.

Houghton said the drama was not science fiction, but rather highlighted the short step ahead of what was actually happening with space exploration. The play posed the question, "what sort of man is an astronaut?"

During the broadcast on 18 May a conversation between two ABC employees was picked up accidentally; it was about the marriage between Princess Margaret and Antony Armstrong-Jones. The ABC said the wrong switch was turned on, saying it was "a human error for which the ABC offers its apology for any inconvenience."

== Reception ==
Filmink, reviewing the thirty minutes of the play that survive, wrote "the concept of an Australian space program is instantly likeable, to me at any rate, and the story was progressing logically, with strong stakes and interesting characters. When the men sit around joking, trying not to talk about death, it even had slight Only Angels Have Wings vibes."

The production sold to US television.

== See also ==
- The End Begins (1961)
- The Road (1964)
- The Stranger (1964–65)
- Campaign for One (1965)
