= George F. Kerr =

English screenwriter

- Born: 15 April 1918; England, UK
- Died: 9 October 1996 (aged 78)
- Occupation: Screenwriter

George F. Kerr (15 April 1918 – 29 October 1996) was an English writer best known for his work in TV. He worked for eight years in British TV as a writer and script editor.

He moved to Australia in 1957 and wrote several early TV dramas as well as stage and radio plays. He returned to England in the mid 1960s.

He was a POW during World War II.

In 1955 when Kerr was a script editor for Associated Television he wrote that "a successful television play should have a strong contemporary story plus a subplot, preferably of emotional entanglement. The story should be classifiable as a study of the peoples next door or, if the troubles are slightly unsavoury, of the people next door but one."

== Doctor Who ==
In April 1966, Kerr was asked from the production office at BBC to work on some stories for Doctor Who on Season 4 of the program. These stories Kerr submitted have no explanation details, and were both rejected by story editor Gerry Davis on 15 June 1966. These stories were entitled as:

The Hearsay Machine

The Heavy Scent of Violence

The Man from the Met

These story titles are all that remain.

(see List of unmade Doctor Who serials and films)

== Select credits ==
- Business in Great Waters (1952) – novel
- A Month of Sundays (TV play) (1952) – British TV play
- Jan and the Blue Fox (1952) – British TV play
- Almost Glory (1953) – radio play
- The Voice (1955) – British radio play
- Killer in Close-Up (1957)
- Symphonie Pastorale (1958)
- Man (Mark II) (1958) – - Australian radio play
- LBW Smith (1957) - radio play
- An Enemy of the People (1958)
- The Multi-Coloured Umbrella (1958) – TV movie
- Blue Murder (1959) – TV movie
- His Name Isn't Rogers (1959) – radio play
- Man in the Grovesnor Hotel (1959) – radio play
- The Last Minute (1960)
- Farewell, Farewell, Eugene (1960) – TV play
- Hunger of a Girl (1960) – play
- Ghost of a Day (1960) – radio play
- The Dock Brief (1960) – TV play
- Moment of Indecision (1961) – radio play
- Heart Attack (1960) – TV play
- A Little South of Heaven (1961) – TV play
- The Concert (1961) – TV play
- Traveller Without Luggage (1961) – TV play
- Once Upon a Time (1961) – radio play
- Jenny (1962) (TV play)
- She'll Be Right (1962) – TV movie
- Ghost of a Day (1964) – radio play
- Quick Before They Catch Us (1966) – TV series
- Z-Cars (1969) – TV series
