= Act of Violence (1956 TV play) =

1956 British BBC TV play

- Written by: Iain MacCormick
- Directed by: Iain MacCormick
- Starring: Andree Melly; Keith Michell; Alan Penn
- Country of origin: United Kingdom
- Original language: English

Production
- Producer: Iain MacCormick
- Running time: 90 mins
- Production company: BBC

Original release
- Network: BBC
- Release: 9 February 1956

Act of Violence is a 1956 television play broadcast by the British Broadcasting Corporation. It was later remade as an Australian television play in 1959.

== Cast ==
- Andrée Melly - Lenora
- Keith Michell - The Man
- Ewen Solon - Inspektor Frink
- Leonard Sachs - Professor Kroz
- Diana Lambert - Katina Kroz
- Philip Stainton - Vent
- Peter Swanwick - General Zuglin
