= Quick Before They Catch Us =

1966 British television series

- Genre: Action; Adventure; Mystery
- Written by: N. J. Crisp; George F. Kerr; Jack Trevor Story; Margot Bennett; John Gray
- Directed by: Derek Martinus; Morris Barry; Paddy Russell; James Cellan Jones
- Starring: Pamela Franklin; Teddy Green; David Griffin
- Theme music composer: Monty Norman
- Opening theme: "Quick Before They Catch Us"
- Country of origin: United Kingdom
- Original language: English
- No. of seasons: 1
- No. of episodes: 20

Production
- Producer: William Sterling
- Running time: 25-30 mins
- Production company: BBC

Original release
- Network: BBC One
- Release: 7 May – 24 September 1966

Quick Before They Catch Us is a 1966 British action/adventure children's television series. It starred then child actors Pamela Franklin, Teddy Green and David Griffin as three teenagers who become amateur detectives in Swinging London during the mid-1960s. Although the series was short-lived, all three stars went on to have long and successful television careers in both the United Kingdom and the United States. Its theme song, written and performed by Brian Epstein's Paddy, Klaus and Gibson, later became a popular tune and one of the group's first hits after releasing it as a single.

== Plot ==
The series concerns the adventures of three London teenagers: Kate (Pamela Franklin), Johnny Martin (Teddy Green) and Mark Dennison (David Griffin), who use their unique talents to solve crimes in their neighbourhood. Kate, the youngest of the three, possessed a photographic memory and was a talented artist; as well as a sketch artist, she most often trailed suspects. Johnny was a technology student and often built surveillance equipment and other inventive gadgets. Mark (David Griffin) was the "nerdy" bookworm of the group, arguably the most intelligent of the three, and was the photographer.

Kate works part-time as a waitress at a café. She is approached by several suspicious men who wish to rent her attic room. The men offer to pay her at first, but then intimidate her until she reluctantly agrees to rent them the room. She befriends Johnny Martin, a mechanic who works at a nearby garage, and photography student Mark Dennison. Kate remains suspicious of her new tenants. With the help of her new friends, she exposes a real estate agent who was using the camera obscura in the attic room to spy on local tenants and blackmail them.

In their second adventure ("Mark Of Distinction"), Mark stops a purse snatcher who inadvertently leads the three friends to uncover a plan to steal a valuable stamp collection. While vacationing on the southern coast of England, the three friends are drawn into a naval plot after Mark snaps an odd-looking photograph. In their last adventure they start a band. Performing at the opening night of the "Big A" nightclub, they find out that someone is planning to steal a picture from the club as part of an art fraud scheme.

== History ==
In the summer of 1966, BBC Television commissioned a replacement series for Dixon of Dock Green during that show's summer hiatus. Five writers – N. J. Crisp, George F. Kerr, Jack Trevor Story, Margot Bennett and John Gray – were hired to create an action serial for children and teenagers. Pamela Franklin, Teddy Green and David Griffin were cast in the lead roles. Green and Griffin had previously guest starred on Dixon of Dock Green.

Each screenwriter wrote one four-episode story. The first story was written by Crisp who, at the time of the series, had written over a dozen original television plays and was a regular contributor for Doctor Finlay's Casebook and Dixon Of Dock Green.

The production crew included Richard Martin, Derek Martinus, Morris Barry and Paddy Russell, all of whom also directed stories for Doctor Who. Barry Newbery, Peter Kindred and Oliver Bayldon worked on the series as set designers.

== Reception ==
The first episode aired on 7 May 1966 in an early Saturday evening timeslot. The Radio Times promoted the show during the first few weeks on the air, and the series appealed to the younger audiences of the 1960s. Although the series received high ratings throughout its run, the series was not renewed. Its final episode was aired on 24 September 1966, and was replaced by the returning Dixon Of Dock Green.

The series theme song was performed by Paddy, Klaus and Gibson, a Liverpool-based group managed by Brian Epstein. It was released as the B side of their third and final single (on Pye 7N 17112 in the UK).

All three stars went on to have successful film and television careers. Franklin later moved to the United States where she guest starred in numerous American television series such as Hawaii Five-O, Police Woman, Fantasy Island and Vega$. Griffin remained in the UK where he became a regular on Hi-de-Hi! as Squadron Leader Clive Dempster, and in Keeping Up Appearances as Emmet Hawksworth. Green would become a visible character actor in both the United Kingdom and the United States, most notably, in the series Holby City.

Quick Before They Catch Us heavily influenced Gerry Anderson's 1970s television series The Protectors. The series was never commercially released on home video and no longer exists in the BBC archives, a victim of the BBC's wiping practices.

== Characters ==
- Kate (Pamela Franklin) - the youngest of the three, she is a typical carefree teenage girl who has unconventional tastes in clothes and pets. She works part-time in a local café while waiting to go to art school.
- Johnny Martin (Teddy Green) - a technological student, Johnny works part-time in a nearby garage also waiting to attend school. He has an exceptional skill for electronics and has, for example, assembled a fully working walkie-talkie from a box of assorted wires, plugs and transistors.
- Mark Dennison (David Griffin) - son of a well-known photographer, Mark also intends to become a photographer as well. He is extremely intelligent and well-read with an encyclopaedic knowledge on a wide number of subjects. He is often referred to in the series as the "brains" of the operation.
- Don (Colin Bell) -

== Episodes ==
No.	Title	Written by	Original release date
1	"Power of Three: Part 1"	N.J. Crisp	7 May 1966
A meeting of three young people ... a discovery ... and an unknown visitor.
2	"Power of Three: Part 2"	N.J. Crisp	14 May 1966
The trio learn of a villainous racket and make a dangerous enemy.
3	"Power of Three: Part 3"	N.J. Crisp	21 May 1966
Johnny gets beaten up and Mark shows how to track down enemy H.Q.
4	"Power of Three: Part 4"	N.J. Crisp	28 May 1966
The three friends are in extreme peril at the end of their first adventure.
5	"Mark of Distinction: Part 1"	George F. Kerr	4 June 1966
A handbag is snatched - and Mark is given an unusual job.
6	"Mark of Distinction: Part 2"	George F. Kerr	11 June 1966
Are the stamps stolen? The trio split up in order to find out.
7	"Mark of Distinction: Part 3"	George F. Kerr	18 June 1966
Johnny breaks into Danny's flat - and Kate has a nasty surprise.
8	"Mark of Distinction: Part 4)"	George F. Kerr	25 June 1966
The trio meet two dangerous conspirators - and show them a couple of tricks.
9	"Season of the Skylark: Part 1"	Jack Trevor Story	9 July 1966
Seaside jobs for two boys and a girl - and their encounter with a very odd family.
10	"Season of the Skylark: Part 2"	Jack Trevor Story	16 July 1966
Whoever saw Kate looking like this? No wonder the boys lose all track of her.
11	"Season of the Skylark: Part 3"	Jack Trevor Story	23 July 1966
Kate is in grave danger - a search leads to a sudden disappearance.
12	"Season of the Skylark: Part 4"	Jack Trevor Story	30 July 1966
A fight with the police ... a lightning rescue ... and the truth at last.
13	"The Tungsten Ring: Part 1"	Margot Bennett	6 August 1966
What was it Mark photographed?
14	"The Tungsten Ring: Part 2"	Margot Bennett	13 August 1966
A dive into the river leads Johnny, Mark and Kate to a discovery - and a frightening consequence.
15	"The Tungsten Ring: Part 3"	Margot Bennett	20 August 1966
Johnny and Mark are too clever by half - and land themselves in an ugly situation.
16	"The Tungsten Ring: Part 4"	Margot Bennett	27 August 1966
The three friends set a trap and land a man-size fish in a final wrestle with the conspirators.
17	"The Weasel Goes Pop: Part 1"	John Gray	3 September 1966
Mark and Kate are invited to perform in a new club. But, careful! Don is in charge.
18	"The Weasel Goes Pop: Part 2"	John Gray	10 September 1966
The three friends investigate odd happenings at the "Big A" and soon encounter trouble.
19	"The Weasel Goes Pop: Part 3"	John Gray	17 September 1966
With the help of a new videotape device, Johnny, Mark and Kate learn how the picture is to be stolen.
20	"The Weasel Goes Pop: Part 4"	John Gray	24 September 1966
Gala opening night of the "Big A" - and what happens after an ingenious theft.

== Archive Status ==
Almost all episodes are currently missing from the archives, with only episode 1 of The Tungsten Ring known to exist.
