= Light Me a Lucifer =

- The Age 19 Dec 1962
- Written by: John O'Grady
- Directed by: William Sterling
- Country of origin: Australia
- Original language: English

Production
- Running time: 75 mins
- Production company: ABC

Original release
- Network: ABC
- Release: 19 December 1962 (Melbourne)
- Release: 26 December 1962 (Sydney)

Light Me a Lucifer is a 1962 Australian television comedy film which aired on ABC. Written by John O'Grady, it starred Frank Thring as the devil, along with Wyn Roberts, Edward Howell, Joan Harris, Ken Goodlet and Lynne Flanagan. It was produced in Melbourne.

Australian TV drama was relatively rare at the time. Stephen Vagg, in Filmink wrote "A 75-minute television comedy was a bold commitment from the ABC at a time when there wasn’t much scripted local comedy... Light Me a Lucifer is a little-known but important work that captures something of Australia. A flawed piece, but it’s brilliant that the ABC made it."

Despite having aired in an era where wiping was common, the TV film still exists.

== Plot ==
In Hell, Satan (Frank Thring) reproaches his Australian agent, Stoker (Edward Howell) for not bringing enough Australians to Hell. Stoker persuades Satan to come to Sydney with his wife Lilith (Lynne Flanagan) to study the situation.

In Australia, married couple Doris and Harry have a 19-year-old daughter Barbara and a neighbor Bill.

Satan arrives in an industrial suburb as Stoker's boss, Nick Devlin.

The Devil decides to give up being the Devil and becomes an Australian instead.

== Cast ==
- Frank Thring as Satan/Nick Devlin
- Kenneth Goodlet as Harry Harmon
- Joan Harris as Doris Harmon
- Edward Howell as Stoker
- Wynn Roberts as Bill
- Lynne Flanagan as Lilith/Lil Devlin
- Bruce Webster
- Lyndel Rowe as Barbara Harmon
- David Mitchell as Sid, Barbara's boyfriend

== Production ==
The production was announced in September 1962.

William Sterling cast according to type. O'Grady attended rehearsals and made some minor cuts and dialogue re-working. Cas Van Puffen did the design.

== Reception ==
The Sydney Morning Herald TV critic called it a "brilliant Melbourne production" which "gave a candid picture of the unsubtle and rough-diamond Aussie, but was in itself subtle and refined in all the details of manner, pronunciation and setting which make up the Australian in-the-round. The main points in this witty study of Australiana were never rammed home they came up naturally in the dialogue" and "the cast portrayed them to perfection."

The Sunday Herald called it "neither a good play nor a bad play but something in between" in which O'Grady "has a sure and accurate ear for the Australian way of speech... but jammed into 75 minutes of television it wasn't enough to bolster a basically weak comedy."

The Bulletin said it "could become a fairly good television play, but not for English ears. The audio side of it would be a torment for them. It was to mine, too, in places... it tried to stretch a thin situation to 75 minutes, which was at least 15 minutes too long for a small joke."

The Age TV critic said it "was not the success it might have been had the author, I imagine, had more time to study television techniques. Ten minutes of talk and hardly any action stalled the play... and, for me, it never got going again."

Filmink wrote "It’s a very funny script with some great lines and moments. It feels as though it could have used a dramaturg to get all the juice out of the characters and situations (O’Grady was never too strong on plots) but you can imagine the actors having the time of their lives with it."
