= Trip-Tease and High C's =

- Directed by: William Sterling
- Written by: Joan and Edgar Seppings
- Production company: ABC
- Release dates: 18 February 1959 (Melbourne, live); 3 June 1959 (Sydney)
- Running time: 45 mins
- Country: Australia
- Language: English

Trip-Tease and High C's is a 1959 Australian television revue which featured an early performance by Barry Humphries. The show was announced in January 1959, off the back of the success of Humphries' first special.

== Cast ==
- Barry Humphries
- Melissa Jaffer
- Edward Brayshaw

== Reception ==
The production was well received. However Humphries then went to England and the ABC refused to put on more shows unless they were of sufficiently high quality.
