= Kay Keavney =

Australian writer

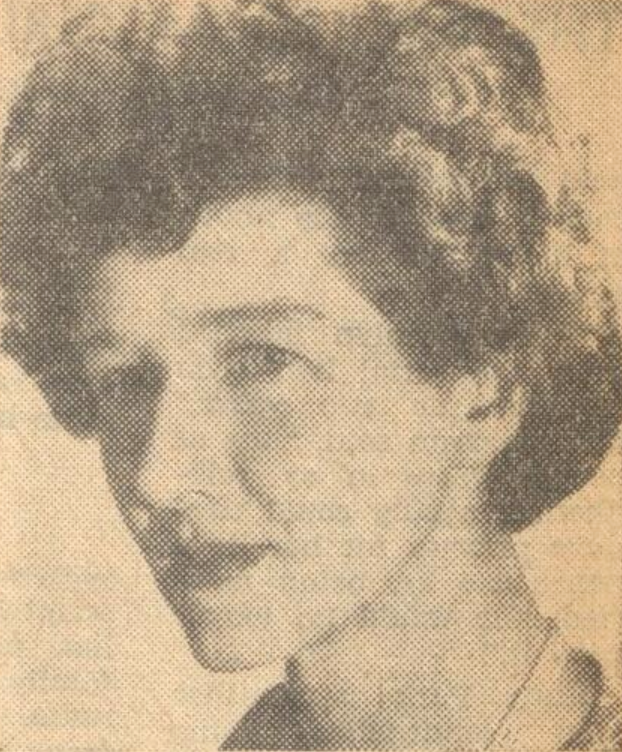
- Keavney in 1953
- Born: 1921; Drummoyne, New South Wales, Australia
- Died: 1989 (aged 67–68)
- Other names: Kay Keane
- Education: University of Sydney
- Occupations: Playwright, radio and television scriptwriter

Kay Keavney (1921–1989) also known as pen name Kay Keane, was an Australian playwright and radio and television scriptwriter, who also worked in the United Kingdom.

== Biography ==
Keavney was born in Drummoyne, New South Wales, a suburb of Sydney in 1921 and completed a Bachelor of Arts at the University of Sydney. She went to work at the ABC, the youngest person and the first woman to be hired as a scriptwriter by that organisation. She resigned from the ABC in 1945.

In the late 1940s she wrote serials and plays for various networks and production companies and became one of the leading writers of Australian radio.

She went to London to study writing TV drama at the BBC and wrote episodes of The Adventures of Long John Silver. She won two Walkley Awards for her journalism.

== Select credits ==
- Mantle of Greatness (1948) (radio play)
- A Tale of Christmas (1954) (television play)
- The Adventures of Long John Silver (1955) (TV series) – writer of various episodes
- Eye of the Night (1960) (television play)
- The Barber (1962) – novel
- The Nurse's Story (1962) (documentary)
- The Story of Peter Grey (1962) (TV mini series)
- Prelude to Harvest (1963) (television play)
- The Nylon Trap (1963) radio serial
- Adventure Unlimited (1965)
- Skippy (1968–70) (TV series) – writer of various episodes
