= Edward Howell (actor) =

British Australian actor, producer, director, writer and drama teacher

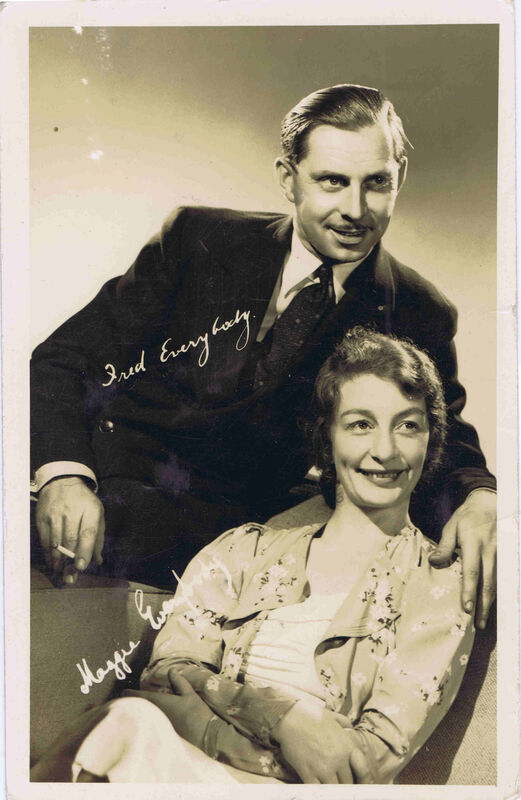
- Edward Howeel and wife Theerese Desmond (1941) stars of radio serial Fred and Maggie Everybody
- Born: Edward Welsford Rowsell Howell; 15 July 1902; Bromley, England
- Died: 20 August 1986 (aged 84); Sydney, Australia
- Other names: E.R. Howell; Edward Welsford Rowsell; Teddy/Ted Howell
- Occupations: Actor (radio, theatre, television and film; radio and theatre producer; radio and theatre director; radio and theatre scriptwriter; theatre founder; drama teacher
- Years active: 1910–1985
- Spouse(s): Mary Grace Cecillia Long (known professionally as Therese Desmond and Molly Long) (m-1927–1961)
- Children: 1

Edward Welsford Rowsell Howell (15 July 1902 – 20 August 1986), also known as pen name E.R. Howell, Edward Welsford Rowsell and Teddy/Ted Howell was a British-born Australian character actor, radio and theatre producer, director and scriptwriter, theatre founder and drama teacher.

He was notable for his career in Australia in all genres of the entertainment industry in a career spanning radio, stage, television and film. In 1927 he appeared in a cameo role in the early Australian film For the Term of his Natural Life, at the time the highest-grossing film in Australian cinema. After this film, he moved to radio broadcasting and producing until reviving his screen career in the late 1950s, mainly appearing in made for TV Movies and serials.

== Early life ==
Howell was born on 15 July 1902 (some sources give 1901) in Bromley, England, the youngest son of bank clerk and actor Edwin Gilburt Howell and his wife Madeleine Ann (née Rowsell). As an eight-year old in 1912, he was brought to Australia with his brother, Lewis, and father to appear in James Cassius Williamson's stage production of The Blue Bird by Belgian playwright Maurice Maeterlinck After the family decided to stay in Australia permanently, he completed his education at Sydney Grammar. With his father moving to settle in Suva, young Ted soon followed, studying law while working in the government's legal department, before joining the Colonial Sugar Refining Company.

== Professional career ==
=== Theatre and tutoring ===
While in Suva, Edward and father Edwin founded the Suva Dramatic Actor Guild. He returned to Australia in 1924 and joined the Playbox Theatre in Melbourne, and later, with his wife Molly, ran Sydney's (Royal) Academy of Dramatic Arts.

=== Radio and theatre (acting, producing, writing and directing) ===
In 1929, he began a career in radio when he was asked by the Australian Broadcasting Commission to produce a play for the network. As an author of one of the first successful variety shows, he had a very prominent career in the sector as a writer, producer and director, as well as appearing in productions as an actor. He was best known as the creator and visionary behind the popular long-running serial Fred and Maggie Everybody, that ran under a number of titles between 1932 and 1953. The series depicted the life of a middle-class couple played by Edward and his wife, Mary Howell (professionally billed as Therese Desmond). At its height it was heard on fifty six stations throughout Australia and was sold to numerous countries including New Zealand.

Edward worked for AWA, where he served as the chief producer of drama, before going freelance as producer and actor. In 1949, he returned to his native England and took up a post at the BBC, writing and producing radio productions as well as stage plays, and returned to Sydney in 1950, where he continued his radio and stage career as a prominent scriptwriter.

=== Television series, TV movies and film ===
After a lengthy successful career in radio and on stage he had a prominent career on television, starting from the 1960s appearing in numerous Australian serials, including My Name's McGooley, What's Yours?, Skippy the Bush Kangaroo, Homicide, Division 4 and Cop Shop.

He appeared in the Brisbane TV play The Absence of Mr Sugden.

He was best known for his recurring role as Bert Griffiths in the long-running rural soap A Country Practice.

In film during the latter he appeared in The Cars That Ate Paris and Careful, He Might Hear You.

== Personal life ==
He was married to Mary Grace Cecilia Long (born Sheffield, 2 May 1902– died Sydney, Australia, 1961) on 11 May 1927, an English-born stage and radio actress and theatre director whom he also collaborated with and known professionally as Therese Desmond or Molly Long, whom he had met while appearing with Sydney's Playbox Theatre, marrying at the St Mary's Cathedral in Sydney. Mary suffered a stroke in 1955 and died in 1961. Edward died on 20 August 1986, in a nursing home in Chatswood at the age of 84, and was cremated. Their daughter, Madeline Howell, was the second wife of the British actor Geoffrey Keen.

== Theatre ==
=== Founder ===
Year	Company	Proprietors
c. early 1920s	Suva Dramatic Actors Guild	Edward Howell – Edwin Howell

=== Theatre company ===
Year	Company	Role
1924	Playbox Theatre	Performer

== Drama school ==
Company	Year	Position
Royal Academy of Dramatic Arts	unknown	Proprietor with Therese Desmond

== Radio ==
=== Radio company roles ===
Company	Year/s	Position
ABC	1929–?	Radio producer, playwright, director, actor
AWA	various	Chief Producer of Drama; Producer and actor
BBC	1949–?	Writer and producer

=== Radio serial/s ===
Production	Role/s
Fred and Maggie Everybody	Creator, writer and performer

== Filmography ==
=== Film ===
Year	Title	Role	Notes
1927	For the Term of his Natural Life	Kirkpatrick	Silent film
1956	The Rose and Crown		TV movie
1956	The Sub-Editor's Room		TV movie
1957	The Passionate Pianist		TV movie
1959	Black Chiffon	Husband	TV movie
1959	One Morning Near Troodos		TV movie
1959	Ruth		TV movie
1959	Till Death Do Us Part		TV movie
1959	Tragedy in a Temporary Town	Harry Phillips	TV movie
1959	A Dead Secret		TV movie
1959	Antony and Cleopatra	Agrippa	TV movie
1959	The Big Day	Horace Skeats	TV movie
1960	Heart Attack		TV movie
1960	Man in a Blue Vase	Uncle Ben	TV movie
1960	Close to the Roof	Perelli	TV movie
1961	Hedda Gabler	Brack	TV movie
1961	Burst of Summer	Joe	TV movie
1961	The Lady from the Sea	Dr Wangel	TV movie
1961	The Big Deal	Solly Parness	TV movie
1961	The Ides of March	Decius	TV movie
1962	Light Me a Lucifer	Stoker	TV movie
1963	Double Yolk	Doctor	TV movie
1963	Uneasy Paradise	Paulo	TV movie
1964	The Angry General	Lord Athol Medway	TV movie
1965	A Time to Speak	Man	TV movie
1965	Campaign for One		TV movie
1965	Daphne Laureola		TV movie
1965	Ring Out Wild Bells	Reverend Stephen Millcote	TV movie
1969	Tilley Landed On Our Shore		TV movie
1972	The Tony Hancock Show	Colonel	TV movie
1974	Moving On		Feature film
1974	The Cars That Ate Paris	Tringham	Feature film
1978	The Night Nurse	Morphett	TV movie
1979	Barnaby and Me	Tennis Umpire	TV movie
1983	Careful, He Might Hear You	Judge	Feature film
1984	Who Killed Hannah Jane?	Mr. Andrews	TV movie

=== Television ===
Year	Title	Role	Notes
1959	Emergency!		Episode: "Death Drive"
1961	The Outcasts	Dr. D'arcy Wentworth	1 episode
1963	Consider Your Verdict	Costella	2 episodes
1964–1973	Homicide	The Pathologist / Judge / John Young / Leo Sheldon / Brian Spurling / Walter Lambert / Lucio / Connor / Harold Smith	9 episodes
1965	The Magic Boomerang	Jim Wallace	2 episodes
1968	My Name's McGooley, What's Yours?	Stallybrass	Episode: "A Change of Gear"
1968	Contrabandits	Quiellen	Episode: "A Mention in Despatches"
1969	Skippy the Bush Kangaroo	Dr. Ames	Episode: "Mixed Company"
1969	Delta	Lawler	Episode: "The Devil Take the Blue Tongue Fly"
1969	Woobinda, Animal Doctor	Doctor	Episode: "A Life for a Life"
1971	The Comedy Game	Speaker	Episode: " Our Man in Canberra"
1971–1973	Matlock Police	Dr. Ian Sutherland / Pop Thompson / Doctor Sutherland	11 episodes
1972	The Virgin Fellas	1st Old Man	1 episode
1972	Spyforce	Doctor O'Hara	Episode: "The Mission"
1973	Division 4	Fergy Ferguson	Episode: "Take Over"
1973	The People Next Door	Dr. Henshaw	Episode: "A Tiny Touch of Tonsil Trouble"
1974	The Evil Touch	Julian	Episode: "Faulkner's Choice"
1974	Class of '75	Mr. Finlay	TV series
1977	Moynihan		Episode: "Bird in the Hand"
1978	Loss of Innocence		Episode: "1943"
1978	Cop Shop	Clive Brooks / Mr. Ashley	2 episodes
1978	Case for the Defence	Wheems	9 episodes
1980	Young Ramsay	Ernie Farrell	Episode: "Natural Selection"
1982–1985	A Country Practice	Bert Griffiths	18 episodes, (final appearance)
1984	Bodyline	Lord Hailsham	1 episode
1985	Colour in the Creek	Joe Ellis	4 episodes
