= Two-Headed Eagle =

1960 film by William Sterling

- Advertisement The Age 14 Dec 1960
- Genre: romantic drama
- Based on: play by Jean Cocteau translated by Carl Wildman
- Written by: Alan Seymour
- Directed by: William Sterling
- Country of origin: Australia
- Original language: English

Production
- Running time: 75 mins
- Production company: ABC

Original release
- Network: ABC
- Release: 14 December 1960 (Melbourne)
- Release: 8 March 1961 (Sydney)
- Release: 3 April 1962 (Brisbane)

Two Headed Eagle is a 1960 Australian television play directed by William Sterling and starring Margo Lee. It was based on a play by Jean Cocteau which had been first presented on the London stage in 1946. The adaptation was by Alan Seymour who wrote a number of TV plays around this time. The play had been produced with Tallulah Bankhead.

== Premise ==
In a fictitious European country, a Queen has been mourning her dead husband for the ten years since he was assassinated. A peasant-poet assassin, Stanislas, sets out to kill her. He is unable to do so after she greets him calmly and he winds up falling for the Queen, which costs him his life.

== Cast ==
- Edward Brayshaw as the assassin Stanislas
- Margo Lee as the Queen
- Michael Duffield as Felix von Willenstein
- Christopher Hill as Christopher Von Foehn, the police chief
- Madeline Howell as Edith Von Berg, the Queen's reader
- Joe Jenkins as Tony

== Production ==
Costumes were by John Peters. The production was shot in Melbourne in 1960 though not broadcast in Sydney until the following year. It featured a 15 minute speech by Margo Lee.

== Reception ==
The Age said it was a "personal triumph" for Lee.

The TV critic for The Sydney Morning Herald praised Margo Lee's performance but thought the play "could have been more effective if there had been a little more care in the production. The camera work relied too much on ordinary close and long shots; there was nothing much, in this respect, to enliven proceedings during the queen's long vocal cadenza; and the quality of the sound-reproduction was variable."

== See also ==
- List of television plays broadcast on Australian Broadcasting Corporation (1960s)
