= Joe Jenkins (dancer) =

American dancer and actor in Australia

Joe Jenkins was an American dancer who moved to Australia and appeared in a number of TV plays. He was a rare black actor who played lead roles in the Australian film industry at the time. He was the first black actor to play a lead role in an Australian TV drama.

Jenkins came to Australia with the Katherine Dunham Dance Company and decided to stay. He made his acting debut in The Square Ring.

== Select filmography ==
- Rita (1959) - TV opera
- Make Outs Music (1959) - variety
- Cafe Continental
- The BP Super Show (1959) - variety show, guest star
- The Square Ring (1960)
- The Emperor Jones (1960)
- The Two Headed Eagle (1960)
- The End Begins (1961)
- Call Me a Liar (1961)
- Just Barbara (1961) and Chez Barbara - variety show starring Barbara Virgil - Jenkins was a regular performer
