= Iain MacCormick (writer) =

Scottish-Australian writer

Iain MacCormick (1917–1965) was a Scottish-Australian writer. He wrote for British TV in the 1950s and 1960s and a number of his works were adapted for Australian TV.

He was a POW for four years during World War II.

== Select Credits ==
- A Beautiful World (1949) - play
- The Small Victory (1954)
- Act of Violence (1956) - TV play
- Marjolaine (1957)
- The Sound of Thunder (1957)
- The Small Victory (1958) - TV movie
- The Uninvited (1958)
- The Money Man (1958) - TV series
- One Morning Near Troodos (1959) - TV movie
- The Hunted (1961)
- Nightfall at Kriekville (1961)
