= The End Begins (film) =

1961 Australian TV science fiction film

- Genre: science fiction
- Written by: Ray Rigby
- Directed by: William Sterling
- Country of origin: Australia
- Original language: English

Production
- Running time: 75 mins
- Production company: ABC

Original release
- Network: ABC
- Release: 22 March 1961 (Melbourne, live)
- Release: 14 June 1961 (Sydney, taped)

The End Begins is a 1961 Australian television play shot in ABC's Melbourne studios. Like many early Australian TV plays it was based on an overseas script. It was a rare Australian TV play with a science fiction theme and a black lead actor, although no recordings are thought to have survived.

== Plot ==
On an island off the west coast of Great Britain, a group of survivors of World War Three struggle to continue living. Hugh Packenham foresaw the oncoming conflict and fled to the island. His only neighbours are fisherman Shaun O'Donnell and his wife Barbara. Then other survivors seek refuge, including an African American sailor, and conflicts develop.

== Cast ==
- Don Crosby as Hugh Pakenham
- Joe Jenkins as Hank Christians, an American serviceman
- Douglas Kelly as Shaun O'Donnell
- Barbara Brandon as Mrs O'Donnell
- Fay Kelton as Valerie Hollis, a young English girl
- Keith Hudson as Tom Jarrow, a bank clerk
- Syd Conabere as Dr Wincot
- Kenrick Hudson as Commander Ridgwell
- James Lynch as Petty Officer Marks
- David Mitchell as Seaman Wells
- Edward Brayshaw as Smithers
- Elizabeth Goodman as woman

== Productions ==
It was based on a British TV play by Ray Rigby, who wrote it in collaboration with his wife Jean when working as a booking clerk at Victoria station. He submitted it to the BBC and they filmed it in 1956 in a production starring Earl Cameron. Rigby later became well known for writing The Hill. His play was later adapted for Australian radio in 1964.

The production was filmed in Melbourne. It was William Sterling's first production after returning to Australia following a trip overseas. Sterling said prior to broadcast:

This is perhaps the most controversial play the ABC has attempted on television. There are a number of dramatic developments that which are not comfortable, easy-way-out solutions of many of the moral and political problems of everyday life. The author's treatment is adult in every sense. This is the type of play television handles best. In fact, this is the first play in a long time that has made such a dramatic comment on contemporary affairs.

The set was created by Douglas Smith who did the designs for Stormy Petrel.

The cast included Joe Jenkins, a black American actor and dancer who came to Australia with the Katherine Dunham Dance Company and decided to stay. He was one of the few black actors to play a lead role in Australia at that time.

== Reception ==
The Sydney Morning Herald said it "had the merit of exploratory camera work" and called it "quite imaginative".
