= Close to the Roof =

1960 Australian live television play

- Ad from the Age 25 Jan 1961
- Genre: Crime
- Based on: play Hideout by Rienits and Stewart Howard based on short story "Heat"
- Written by: Rex Rienits
- Directed by: Raymond Menmuir
- Country of origin: Australia
- Original language: English

Production
- Running time: 60 mins
- Production company: ABC

Original release
- Network: ABC
- Release: 14 December 1960 (Sydney, live)
- Release: 25 January 1961 (Melbourne, taped)

Close to the Roof is a 1960 Australian live television play which aired on ABC. Broadcast 14 December 1960 in Sydney, it was kinescoped ("telerecorded") and shown in Melbourne on 25 January 1961 (it is not known it was also shown on ABC's stations in Adelaide, Brisbane and Perth). Australian TV drama was relatively rare at the time.

It was also adapted for radio by the ABC in 1960.

== Plot ==
In a house in the Sydney suburb of Surry Hills, two siblings, Lucy and Charlie, prepare the beds in their attic for guests. The siblings are the children of Tony Perelli, a widowed Italian migrant who is bitter about his lack of success in Australia, and who is determined to return home from whose children come home. Tony refuses to let Lucy work and does not know the Charlie has been boxing, thinking that he is going to be a musician.

Two men, Wally and Joe, arrive to stay in the attic. They were part of a trio who robbed a band at Newtown, which resulted in people being injured; the third member of their group, Bill, was captured in a shoot out. They are paying Tony money and Tony's children discover this; they are unhappy about it but support their father.

Joe is an ex-boxer from the country on his first robbery Wally is an experienced criminal. Joe and Lucia seem to like each other. Joe gives Charlie advice how to fight a particular boxer.

As the days pass, things become tense between Joe and Wally. They disagree over a number of things including Lucy and over how to divide the money. Bill dies in hospital without waking up and Joe wants them to give Bill's share to the latter's widow. Wally mandhandles Lucy, resulting in Joe fatally knocking out Wally.

Charlie and Tony bury Wally's corpse in French's Forest. Tony discovers that Joe has been helping his son with boxing and orders the criminal out of the house. Charlie decides to drive Joe to Queensland. Joe tells Lucy that he has a girlfriend but she deduces he is lying and they kiss. Joe realises police are waiting outside. He knocks out Charlie so the latter will not follow him, and walks out the front of the house. A gunshot rings out.

== Cast ==
- Stewart Ginn as Wally Fox
- Ron Haddrick as Joe Cullon
- Edward Howell as Tony Perelli
- Josephine Dunphy as Lucy Perelli
- Ken Lawrence as Charlie Perelli

== Source material ==
Hideout
- Original language: English
- Written by: Rex Rienits; Stewart Howard

Premiere
- Date: May 1, 1937
- Place: Independent Theatre
- Directed by: John Alden

The play was based on stage play called Hideout by Rex Rienits and Stewart Howard which was produced at Sydney's Independent Theatre in 1937 starring John Alden.

This in turn was based on a story by Howard called Heat, which appeared in the Melbourne magazine, Pandemonium in 1934.

Heat led to Adelaide police to seize copies of the magazine. (The story was published in Coast to Coast in 1941.)

== Production ==
Early Australian TV drama production was dominated by using imported scripts but in 1960 the ABC was undertaking what has been described as "an Australiana drive" of producing local stories. Nonetheless advertising promoted it as "the play seen on British TV". It was Ron Haddrick's first TV appearance.

== Reception ==
The Sydney Morning Herald said it was "a fairly efficient if unimportant variation on the "and then there were none" theme" whose "only unusual contributions to the form were its "don't - come - the - raw prawn" dialogue and its coincidental echoes of the two most successful Australian dramas of recent years", namely The Shifting Heart (in Edward Howell's character) and Summer of the Seventeenth Doll (in the characters of the two robbers). The reviewer said Haddrick's "appearance was entirely convincing, a piece of sculptured Australiana" but that Ginn's character "a rat under a hot tin roof if ever there was one, was the most interesting character before the cameras." The reviewer added the "production made a virtue of dispensing with background music and of confining the action almost entirely to one setting. The unconvincing sounds of shooting at the end of the play were a minor flaw."

The allegations of "coincidental echoes" with two other Australian plays prompted Rex Rienits to write to the newspaper pointing out the play was based on a stage play called Hideout which had been performed at the Independent Theatre twenty years earlier, well before Shifting Heart or Doll had been written.

The critic responded to Rienits, denying he had made a charge of plagiarism.

== See also ==
- List of television plays broadcast on Australian Broadcasting Corporation (1960s)
