= Syd Conabere =

Australian actor (1918–2008)

- Born: Sydney Leicester Conabere, 8 July 1918; Footscray, Victoria
- Died: 15 July 2008 (aged 90); Sydney, Australia
- Occupation: Actor
- Years active: Film and television 1957–2002, theatre 1938–1989
- Spouse: Elizabeth "Betty" Howden (m. 1945)
- Children: Prudence, Sally

Sydney Leicester Conabere (8 July 1918 – 15 July 2008) was an Australian actor and puppeter. He was notable for his work in theatre, film and television drama in a career spanning more than fifty years. In 1962 Conabere won the Logie award for Best Actor, for his performance in the television play The One Day of the Year.

He is known for his stints in soap operas Sons and Daughters as Doug Palmer and Neighbours as patriarch Dan Ramsay

== Biography ==
Conabere was born in the Melbourne suburb of Footscray on 8 July 1918 and worked prolifically in the industry starting out as a stage actor with Gregan McMahon in 1938, in particularly he worked with the Melbourne Theatre Company and Melbourne Little Theatre, sharing the stage (and applause) with Irene Mitchell in, for example, Lilian Hellman's The Little Foxes.

Conabere had an extensive career as a character actor from the 1950s to the 2000s, regularly appearing in popular Australian television serials, including Emergency, Matlock Police and Homicide. He worked for a short period in the United Kingdom, appearing in the drama serials Z Cars and Sherlock Holmes, the comedy Please Sir!, and in the crime film Man of Violence.

In the 1980s Conabere reached a wider international audience, making occasional appearances in two long running Australian soap operas, in Neighbours as Dan Ramsay and as Doug Palmer in Sons and Daughters.

Sydney Conabere died in Sydney, Australia on 15 July 2008, aged 90.

== Selected filmography ==
=== Film ===
- The Duke in Darkness (1957, TV movie)
- Sound of Thunder (1957, TV movie)
- The Small Victory (1958, TV movie)
- Captain Carvallo (1958, TV movie)
- Wild Life and Christmas Belles (1958, TV movie)
- One Morning Near Troodos (1959, TV movie)
- Till Death Do Us Part (1959, TV movie)
- The Big Day (1959, TV movie)
- Ned Kelly (1959, TV movie)
- Outpost (1959, TV movie) – Signaller Tiger Lyons
- Eye of the Night (1960, TV movie)
- The End Begins (1961, TV movie)
- The Devil Makes Sunday (1962, TV movie) – Clay
- She'll Be Right (1962, TV movie) – Bluey
- You Can't Win 'Em All (1962, TV movie) – Corrigan Blake
- The One Day of the Year (1962, TV movie)
- Murder in the Cathedral (1962, TV movie)
- Uneasy Paradise (1962, TV movie) – Billy
- Corruption in the Palace of Justice (1964, TV movie)
- Everyman (1964, TV movie) – Confession
- The Physicists (1964, TV movie)
- Luther (1964, TV movie)
- Daphne Laureola (1965, TV movie)
- Plain Jane (1966, TV movie)
- The Shifting Heart (1968)
- Man of Violence (1970) – Alec Powell
- Cool It Carol! (1970) – Lazlo
- Country Town (1971) – Ted Atkins
- Petersen (1974) – Annie's Father
- The Trespassers (1976) – Harry
- Blue Fire Lady (1977) – Mr. Bartlett
- The Big Hurt (1986) – O'Neal
- Heaven Tonight (1990) – Priest
- Greenkeeping (1992) – Milton

=== Television ===
- Emergency (1959, TV series) – George Rogers
- Homicide (TV series, 1965–76)
- Hunter (TV series, 1967, 1968)
- Australian Playhouse "A Stay at Home" (not aired)
- Sherlock Holmes (TV series, 1968)
- Please Sir! (TV series, 1969)
- Z Cars (TV series, 1970)
- Division 4 (TV series, 1971–74)
- Matlock Police (TV series, 1971–76)
- A Taste for Blue Ribbons (1973, TV series) – John Emmet
- Sons and Daughters (1982–84, TV series) – Doug Palmer
- A Country Practice (1983–93, TV series) – Reg Brundle / Alec Hales / Eddie Marshall
- Neighbours (1986–88, TV series) – Dan Ramsay
- Poor Man's Orange (TV miniseries, 1987)
- The Harp in the South (TV miniseries, 1987)
- E Street (1992, TV series) – Grandpa Windsor
- Home and Away (1994, TV series) – Gerry
- Heartbreak High (1996, TV series) – Jack Shaw
- All Saints (1998–2002, TV Series) – William Belden / Maurie Taylor (final appearance)
