= Who Killed Kovali? =

- Based on: radio play Who Killed Rikhjovi by Rex Rienits
- Written by: Rex Rienits
- Directed by: William Sterling
- Country of origin: Australia
- Original language: English

Production
- Running time: 60 mins
- Production company: ABC

Original release
- Network: ABV-2 (Melbourne)
- Release: 13 July 1960 (Melbourne, live)
- Release: 14 September 1960 (Sydney, taped)
- Release: 1 March 1961 (Brisbane)

Who Killed Kovali? is a 1960 Australian television play. It had previously been filmed for British TV in 1957.

It was made at a time Australian TV drama was rare. It was one of several thrillers filmed in the early days of Australian television.

== Plot ==
Hungarian tennis player Ivor Kovali is playing in a semi-final at Wimbledon against Australian player Tony Hargreaves. Kovali, who is winning the game, is chewing sweets then dies suddenly of arsenic poisoning.

A Scotland Yard inspector, Carson, looks into the murder with the help of his assistant, Sgt Scott. Suspects include his widow Maria, who hated Kovali's cruelty; Maria's lover Dimitri; Tony Hargreaves, who stood to win a thousand pounds if he won the game; Australian player Jeff Willis who Kovali accused of cheating; American played Pedro Moreno who was going to face Kovali in the final.

When Carson views footage of the game he figures out whodunnit.

== Cast ==
- Keith Eden as Inspector Carson
- Charles Sinclair as Sgt Scott
- Mark Kelly as Tony Hargreaves
- Alan Hopgood as Jeff Willis
- Fay Kelton as Jill Masters, Tony Hargreaves' fiancé
- Penelope Shelton as Maria Kovali
- Edward Brayshaw as Dimitri Rikhjovic
- David Mitchell as Pedro Moreno
- Carole Potter as Nancy
- Laurie Lange as official in charge of Wimbledon
- Bryan Edwards as Igor Kovali

== Radio play ==
It was based on a radio play, Who Killed Rikhjovic by Rex Rienits, an Australian who had worked in London for many years.

The play was performed on British radio in 1954, then on Australian radio in 1955 starring Keith Eden as Inspector Carson; Eden would reprise this role in the 1960 TV production. The play was given a new production on Australian radio a few months later, starring Charles Tingwell.

== 1957 British TV version ==
Rienits adapted the story for British TV where it was named "Who Killed Kovali" and was produced as part of ITV Playhouse in 1957.

=== Cast ===
- Annette Carell
- Allan Cuthbertson as Carson
- Maureen Davis

=== Reception ===
The Daily Telegraph said it had "an interesting opening but disappointing in the development... the majority of viewers must surely have spotted the culprit some time before the end and play therefore could hardly be expected to hold our interest. Some character development might have helped but then in these hour long television plays plot is everything and characterisation is thrown to the winds."

== Production ==
Early Australian TV drama production was dominated by using imported scripts but in 1960 the ABC was undertaking what has been described as "an Australiana drive" of producing local stories. In January 1960 the ABC announced they would show a series of ten plays by local writers. This included Who Killed Kovali?

It was filmed at the ABC's studios in Melbourne, with some location work done at Kooyong Tennis Courts standing in for Wimbledon. John Cooper, brother of Ashley Cooper, played a ballboy. The voice of Kenrick Hudson, a real tennis umpire, was used as an umpire's voice.

Fay Kelton and Penelope Shelton made their first Melbourne TV appearances.

== Reception ==
The television critic from The Sydney Morning Herald thought that the basic idea "could have been made diverting" but in the production, "attitudinising displaced frank exposure and cardboard cut-outs, delivering dialogue usually heard only in morning serials on radio, stood in for characters." He added that director William Sterling "kept the action moving smoothly and filled in such details as background music with unobtrusive efficiency."

The Age called it "an exciting trifle of the general appeal type and the Australian cast handled its presentation very well... a rather exciting one hour television play."
