= William Sterling (director) =

William Sterling (born 14 September 1926) was an Australian producer and director.

== Biography ==
Sterling was born in Sydney, one of two brothers. When his father was killed during World War II, Sterling left school to work in a chartered accountant's office. He served in the Royal Australian Navy then did a Bachelor of Arts at Sydney University, with Honours in English and History. He was going to be a teacher, but then got a job as liaison officer between the ABC and the Department of Education. He began writing and producing radio plays, and in 1956 moved into directing television at the ABC. He moved to Melbourne in 1957.

Sterling originally directed all sorts of programs for the ABC, but in October 1959, was assigned to drama full time. Audrey Rogers was his assistant.

Sterling directed a landmark Australian TV play about Aboriginal Australians Burst of Summer (1960).

Sterling collaborated several times with Robert Helpmann.

In 1961, he commenced shooting a feature film about Burke and Wills with Edward Brayshaw. This became known as Return Journey.

In 1965 he went to the USA for a study tour, worked for three months with CBC Toronto, then settled in the UK.

Sterling returned to Australia in 1972 to promote the release of Alice in Wonderland and criticised local movies as too self consciously Australian. He returned again in 1977 seeking finance for a feature called The Bird of Strange Plumage. Filmink reported Sterling "kind of vanished" after making Alice.

== Filmography ==
- Ending It (1957)
- Rope (1957)
- Captain Carvallo (1958)
- Gaslight (1958)
- Killer in Close-Up (1958)
- The Small Victory (1958)
- Wild Life and Christmas Belles (1958)
- Trip-Tease and High C's (1959)
- One Morning Near Troodos (1959)
- A Dead Secret (1959)
- Black Limelight (1959)
- Ned Kelly (1959)
- Treason (1959)
- Mine Own Executioner (1960)
- Macbeth (1960)
- Dark Under the Sun (1960)
- Who Killed Kovali? (1960)
- Shadow of Heroes (1961)
- Call Me a Liar (1961)
- Hedda Gabler (1961)
- Night of the Ding-Dong (1961)
- Burst of Summer (1961)
- The Lady from the Sea (1961)
- The Big Deal (1961)
- The Ides of March (1961)
- Murder in the Cathedral (1962)
- Light Me a Lucifer (1962).
- The Devil Makes Sunday (1962)
- The Hobby Horse (1962)
- The Music Upstairs (1962)
- The Forbidden Rite (1962)
- The Prisoner (1963)
- The Pearl Fishers (1963)
- Uneasy Paradise (1963)
- Barnstable (1963)
- The Fighting Cock (1963)
- A Man for All Seasons (1964)
- Half an Hour with Robert Helpmann (1964)
- Compact (1965) (TV series)
- Quick Before They Catch Us (1966) (TV series)
- The Three Musketeers (1966–67)
- The Further Adventures of the Musketeers (1967) (TV series)
- Sherlock Holmes (1968) (TV Series)
- Dr. Finlay's Casebook (1969) (TV series)
- The Expert (1969) (TV series)
- Counterstrike (1969) (TV series)
- Alice's Adventures in Wonderland (1972)
