= Gaslight (1958 film) =

- Ad from 3 Mar 1958
- Based on: Gas Light; 1938 play by Patrick Hamilton
- Directed by: William Sterling
- Starring: Beverly Dunn
- Country of origin: Australia
- Original language: English

Production
- Cinematography: Frank Few
- Running time: 75 minutes
- Production company: ABC

Original release
- Release: 8 January 1958 (Melbourne, live)
- Release: 4 March 1958 (Sydney, taped)

Gaslight is a 1958 television play broadcast by the Australian Broadcasting Corporation based on the 1938 play Gas Light by Patrick Hamilton. It starred Beverley Dunn.

It was one of several Patrick Hamilton adaptations done on Australian television.

== Plot ==
Years after her aunt was murdered in her home, a young woman, Bella Manningham, moves back into the house with her new husband. However, he has a secret that he will do anything to protect, even if means driving his wife insane.

== Cast ==
- Beverley Dunn as Bella Manningham
- Brian James as Manningham
- John Morgan as Inspector Rough
- Mary Ward as Elizabeth
- Judith Godden as Nancy the housemaid
- Neville Thurgood as police constable

== Production ==
William Sterling came down from Sydney to direct. It was the eleventh play to be performed live on Melbourne television – the others were Roundabout, The Twelve Pound Look, Holiday in Biarritz, Fair Passenger, The Right Person, Dark Brown, The Duke in Darkness, The Sound of Thunder and Killer in Close Up.

It was one of a number of TV performances given by Dunn, others including Roundabout, The Lark, The Small Victory and Fair Passenger.

== Reception ==
The Sydney Morning Herald said the "production was well received by viewers and critics in Melbourne."

== See also ==
- List of live television plays broadcast on Australian Broadcasting Corporation (1950s)
