= List of live television plays broadcast on the Australian Broadcasting Corporation (1956–1969) =

The following is a list of live television plays broadcast on Australian broadcaster ABC from its inception in 1956 until 1969. Some were produced in Sydney (on ABN-2), and some were produced in Melbourne (on ABV-2). Most of the Sydney productions were kinescoped so they could be shown in Melbourne, and vice versa. It is not known how many of these kinescope recordings still exist.

Most of the live television plays presented on ABC during the period were adaptations of overseas stage plays, or new versions of works originally aired on BBC television. A few were written locally. The list mainly consists of drama and comedy productions, and also includes several opera presentations.

== 1950s ==
=== 1956 ===
- The Telephone – first opera broadcast
- The Twelve Pound Look – based on play by J.M. Barrie – a play broadcast the first night the ABC went to air
- The Sub-Editor's Room – produced and written by Leslie Rees – first Australian-written television drama to air on Australian TV.

=== 1957 ===
- Amahl and the Night Visitors – opera
- Dark Brown – story of unknown origin
- The Duke in Darkness – adaptation of play by Patrick Hamilton
- Ending It – adaptation of British play
- Fair Passenger – adaptation of 1955 British TV play
- A Fourth for Bridge
- Holiday in Biarritz
- The Importance of Being Earnest – adaptation of play by Oscar Wilde
- In The Zone – adaptation of play by Eugene O'Neill
- Killer in Close-Up – four episodes broadcast over 1957–58
- The Passionate Pianist – adaptation of original Australian play by Barbara Vernon
- A Phoenix Too Frequent – adaptation of play by Christopher Fry
- The Proposal – based on the play A Marriage Proposal by Anton Chekov
- The Right Person
- Rope – adaptation of play by Patrick Hamilton
- Roundabout
- Shadow of Doubt – based on a British play
- The Sound of Thunder
- The Sub-Editor's Room – an original Australian play
- Sunday Costs Five Pesos
- Three Cornered Moon
- Tomorrow's Child
- Twelve Pound Look (a different adaptation to the 1956 version)
- The Wraith

=== 1958 ===
- As You Are
- The Barber of Seville
- Box for One
- Captain Carvallo
- Chance of a Ghost
- Citizen of Westminster – adaptation of British play
- An Enemy of the People
- Fidelio
- G'day Digger
- Gaslight – adaptation of play by Patrick Hamilton
- The Governess – adaptation of play by Patrick Hamilton
- His Excellency
- I Pagliacci (1958) – opera
- If It's a Rose
- The Lark
- Last Call
- Miss Mabel
- The Multi-Coloured Umbrella – adaptation of Australian stage play
- Murder Story
- The Public Prosecutor
- Rose Without a Thorn
- Sixty Point Bold
- The Small Victory
- Sorry, Wrong Number
- Symphonie Pastorale
- Three's Company – opera

=== 1959 ===
- Act of Violence
- Albert Herring – opera
- Antony and Cleopatra – adaptation of Shakespeare
- Black Chiffon
- Black Limelight
- Blue Murder – original Australian TV play
- Bodgie – original Australian TV play
- Cavalleria Rusticana – opera
- Crime Passionel
- A Dead Secret
- Dinner with the Family
- Hamlet
- Lady in Danger – adaptation of 1942 Australian play
- Misery Me
- One Bright Day
- One Morning Near Troodos – adaptation of BBC TV play
- Outpost – original Australian play written for TV
- Prima Donna (1959) – opera
- Rita – opera (per a search of their website, National Archives may hold a copy)
- The Seagull
- The Skin of Our Teeth
- The Soldier's Tale
- The Strong are Lonely
- Till Death Do Us Part
- Treason
- Trip Tease and High C's (1959)
- Wuthering Heights

== 1960s ==
=== 1960 ===
- The Bartered Bride (1960) – opera
- Close to the Roof (1960) – TV play
- The Dock Brief (1960) – TV play based on British play by John Mortimer
- Even Unto Bethlehem (1960) – opera
- Heart Attack
- Il Seraglio (1960) – opera
- The Life and Death of King Richard II (1960) – TV play
- The Marriage of Figaro – opera
- The Medium (1960) – opera
- Ned Kelly (1960)
- The Scent of Fear (1960)
- The Slaughter of St Theresa's Day – based on Australian play by Peter Kenna
- The Square Ring (1960) – TV play
- Swamp Creatures (1960) – TV play
- Turning Point (1960) – TV play
- Venus Observed

=== 1961 ===
- The Abduction from the Seraglio
- The Big Client (1961)
- Burst of Summer
- Corinth House (1961)
- Il Tabarro – opera
- La Boheme
- A Little South of Heaven
- The Merchant of Venice
- The Night of the Ding Dong (1961)
- A Night Out
- Samson and Delilah – opera
- The Secret of Susannah – opera
- The Sergeant from Burralee (1961) – TV play
- The Tell-Tale Heart
- Two Headed Eagle – based on an ITV play

=== 1962 ===
- Boy Round the Corner – original Australian TV play
- The Case of Private Hamp (1962)
- The Consul – opera
- The Devil Take Her – opera
- Don Pasquale – opera
- Fly by Night – original Australian TV play
- Funnel Web – original Australian TV play
- Hansel and Gretel – opera
- The Hobby Horse – original Australian TV play
- The House of Mancello – original Australian TV play
- Jenny – original Australian TV play
- La Serva Padrona – opera
- The Land of Smiles – opera
- L’Enfant Prodigue – opera
- Lola Montez (1962)
- Madame Butterfly – opera
- My Three Angels – based on an American play by Samuel and Bella Spewack adapted from a French play
- The Pearlfishers – opera
- She'll Be Right
- The Taming of the Shrew
- The Teeth of the Wind – original Australian TV play

=== 1963 ===
- Ballad for One Gun (1963) – TV play about Ned Kelly
- Bastien and Bastienne – opera
- A Dead Secret
- Don't Listen Ladies (1963)
- Fisher's Ghost – opera
- Flowering Cherry (1963) – based on play by Robert Bolt
- The Long Sunset (1963) – based on play by R.C. Sheriff
- Manon – opera
- A Piece of Ribbon (1963)
- The Right Thing (1963) – TV play
- The Sentimental Bloke (1963)
- Simone Boccanegra – opera
- The Tempest
- The White Carnation (1963)
- The Young Victoria

=== 1964 ===
- Cinderella – opera
- I Pagliacci (No.2) – opera
- Peter Grimes – opera
- Tosca – opera

=== 1965 ===
- Amelia Goes to the Ball – opera
- The Big Killing
- A Christmas Play – opera
- The Gypsy Baron – opera
- Louise (1965) – opera
- Macbeth
- Ring Out Wild Bells
- Rusty Bugles
- School for Fathers – opera
- The Tape Recorder (1965)
- Thirty-One Backyards (1965) – TV pkay
- The Tower (1965)
- What About Next Year (1965)

=== 1966 ===
- Anonymous (1966)
- The Attack (1966)
- Blind Balance (1966)
- The Decision (1966)
- Easy Terms (1966)
- Goodbye, Gloria, Hello! (1966)
- The Gypsy Baron (1966) – opera
- Maestro a Capella – opera
- Marleen (1966)
- Objector (1966)
- The Paradise Shanty (1966)
- A Small Wonder (1966)
- Ticket to Nowhere (1966)
- The Third Witness (1966)
- V.I.P.P. (1966)

=== 1967 ===
- The Brass Guitar (1967)
- The Five-Sided Triangle, Or One Too Many (1967)
- Shadow on the Wall (1967)
- Slow Poison (1967)

=== 1968 ===
- Fiends of the Family (1968) – based on novel by Pat Flower
- The Shifting Heart (1968)

=== 1969 ===
- The Cheerful Cuckold (1969)
- The Torrents (1969) – based on Australian play by Oriel Grey

== See also ==
- The Adventures of Long John Silver
- Take That – 1957–1959, reputedly Australia's first regularly broadcast sitcom
- Autumn Affair – 1958–1959 Sydney-produced soap opera
- Emergency – 1959 Melbourne-produced series
- The House on the Corner (1957, ATN-7)
- List of television plays broadcast on ATN-7
- Shell Presents – one off plays on ATN-7/GTV-9, 1959–1960
