= An Enemy of the People (1958 film) =

- Based on: An Enemy of the People by Henrik Ibsen
- Written by: George F. Kerr
- Directed by: Royston Morley
- Starring: James Condon; Edward Smith
- Country of origin: Australia
- Original language: English

Production
- Producer: Les Weldon
- Running time: 65 mins
- Production company: ABC

Original release
- Network: ABC
- Release: 5 November 1958 (Sydney, live)
- Release: 14 December 1958 (Melbourne, taped)

An Enemy of the People is a 1958 Australian television play starring James Condon. It was based on the 1882 play by Henrik Ibsen and was updated to a contemporary Australian setting. It was broadcast live.

== Plot ==
A new resort is about to open in the Queensland coastal town of Jacaranda. A central feature of the resort is the fact the area has mineral waters which are beneficial to people's health. Dr Stockman discovers that a local tannery is poisoning the water. This would be expensive to fix so the townspeople are opposed to him, including the mayor (his brother), the local newspaper editor and the owner of the tannery. Pressure is put on his wife Kate and daughter Jan. Jan resigns from her teaching post.

== Cast ==
- James Condon as Dr. Stockman
- Eleanor Elliott as Jan Stockman
- Aileen Britton as Kate Stockman
- Moray Powell
- Lou Vernon

== Production ==
George F. Kerr was an English writer who had moved to Australia. He was asked to adapt the play to Australia and decided to set it in Queensland. Morley had done a number of Ibsen adaptations in England on TV.

It was broadcast in a series of "live" dramas on Sunday night on ABV-2 Melbourne. In order, they were The Governess, The Last Call, The Rose without a Thorn, The Lark, Citizen of Westminster, and Enemy of the People (the last of "the season").

Desmonde Dowling was the designer.

== Reception ==
Filmink. reviewing the script, felt Kerr did not really properly adapt the text to Australia.

== See also ==
- List of live television plays broadcast on Australian Broadcasting Corporation (1950s)
