= A Rose Without a Thorn =

- Based on: play by Clifford Bax
- Directed by: Alan Burke
- Country of origin: Australia
- Original language: English

Production
- Running time: 60 mins

Original release
- Release: 10 September 1958 (live, Sydney)
- Release: 2 November 1958 (recording, Melbourne)

A Rose without a Thorn is a 1958 Australian television play about King Henry VIII's marriage to Catherine Howard. It was directed by Alan Burke from a play by Clifford Bax. The play was shown live in Sydney, recorded, then shown in Melbourne.

== Premise ==
The courtship and marriage of King Henry VIII and Catherine Howard.

== Cast ==
- Kevin Brennan as Henry VIII
- Margaret Wolfit as Anne of Cleves
- Elisabeth Waterhouse as Mary Lascelles
- Moray Powell as Thomas Cranmer
- Margo Lee as Catherine Howard
- Charles Tasman as Audley
- Jerome White as Thomas Culpepper
- John Huson as Earl of Hertford
- Philippa Baker

== Production ==
A Rose Without a Thorn had been performed in 1933. It was adapted for Australian radio by Max Afford in 1940, a production much revived. It was also filmed by British TV in 1948.

It was the first production directed by Alan Burke after he joined the ABC full-time. Burke would go on to be one of the leading directors of the early days of Australian television. Seven different sets were used in the program.

It was broadcast in a series of "live" dramas on Sunday night on ABV-2 Melbourne. In order, they were The Governess, The Last Call, The Rose without a Thorn, The Lark, Citizen of Westminster, and Enemy of the People (the last of "the season").

== See also ==
- List of live television plays broadcast on Australian Broadcasting Corporation (1950s)
