= Brian James (actor) =

Australian actor (1918–2009)

- Brian James in 1984 in his stint in the cult TV series Prisoner as Officer Stan Dobson
- Born: 5 July 1918; Maryborough, Victoria, Australia
- Died: 2 November 2009 (aged 91); Melbourne, Victoria, Australia
- Other name: Brian D. James
- Education: Royal Central School of Speech and Drama
- Occupation: Actor
- Years active: 1947-2003

Brian James (5 July 1918 – 2 November 2009) was an Australian radio, stage, television and film actor.

== Early life and theatre ==
Brian James was born in Melbourne, the son of the Bishop of St. Arnaud and started his career as a teacher at Ivanhoe Grammar School for four years. He joined the Royal Australian Navy in 1933. After being demobilised five years later, he decided to pursue a career as an actor, attending Royal Central School of Speech and Drama in London, and making his stage debut in 1947. He featured in the 1952 J.C. Williamson production of Seagulls Over Sorrento, and also appeared in the 1960 TV production of the play.

== Television and film ==
According to screenwriter Richard Lane "in that first decade of television it seemed that Brian James was everywhere."

James appeared in several ABC drama plays in the late 1950s, including Duke In Darkness and Killer in Close-Up: The Wallace Case in 1957, Gaslight, The Small Victory, The Public Prosecutor, and The Governess (all 1958), Crime Passionel, Treason, and The House By The Stable (1959).

He had the lead role as Dr Geoffrey Thompson in the early medical drama Emergency (1959). He also appeared in commercial dramas Shadow of a Pale Horse and Seagulls Over Sorrento in 1960, along with ABC dramas Heart Attack, Eye of the Night, and Mine Own Executioner, and was awarded the TV Week Logie award for "Best Actor" for the plum role of Governor William Bligh in the 1960 ABC drama serial Stormy Petrel (a role which he reprised in a 1974 episode of the anthology series Behind The Legend).

Other ABC drama play appearances included The Ides Of March (1961), The Physicists, Luther, and The Wind From The Icy Country (all 1964).

In 1962, he took the lead role of Jonah Locke in the ATN-7 drama series Jonah.

In 1964, James appeared as a presenter on This Is It!, the opening night program for ATV-0 in Melbourne.

He also featured as Ian Bennett in Bellbird. He appeared as George Tippett in the soap opera Skyways (1979–81) – a character he continued in the ill-fated series Holiday Island in 1981.

He is probably best known to international audiences for his part in the cult soap opera Prisoner (aka Prisoner: Cell Block H) as friendly officer and later prison handyman Stan Dobson, having previously appeared in the series briefly as Dr. Kennedy. He also appeared as John Worthington in Neighbours in the late 1980s.

On film, he made an uncredited appearance as a naval officer in the 1959 Stanley Kramer film On the Beach. He also played screen father to Meryl Streep in A Cry in the Dark, the 1988 movie about the Lindy Chamberlain court case.

== Personal life and death ==
Brian James had served with the Royal Australian Navy during World War II. He died at The Alfred Hospital, Melbourne, of complications following a fall in 2009 aged 91.

== Filmography ==
Year	Title	Role	Notes
1954	Seagulls Over Sorrento		
1959	On the Beach	Bit Part	Uncredited
1966	Adulterous Affair	Stephen	
1974	Between Wars	Deborah's Father	
1976	The Fourth Wish	Jarvis	
1983	Moving Out	Mr. Aitkins	
1987	Ground Zero	Vice-Adm. Windsor	
1988	Evil Angels	Cliff Murchison	
1997	Joey	Ticket Master	
2003	Bad Eggs	Newsreader	Voice

== Television ==
Year	Title	Role	Notes
1957	The Duke in Darkness		ABC drama play
1957	Killer in Close-Up: The Wallace Case	Prosecutor	ABC drama play
1958	Gaslight		ABC drama play
1958	The Small Victory		ABC drama play
1958	The Public Prosecutor		ABC drama play
1958	The Governess		ABC drama play
1959	Crime Passionel		ABC drama play
1959	Treason		ABC drama play
1959	The House by the Stable		ABC drama play
1959	Emergency	Dr Geoffrey Thompson	TV series
1960	Shadow of a Pale Horse		TV play
1960	Heart Attack		
1960	Eye of the Night		TV play
1960	Mine Own Executioner		
1960	Stormy Petrel	Governor William Bligh	
1961	The Ides Of March		ABC drama play
1961	The Physicists		ABC drama play
1962	Jonah	Jonah Locke	ATN-7 drama series
1964	Luther		ABC drama play
1964	Wind from the Icy Country		ABC drama play
1964	This Is It!	Presenter	
1964	Bellbird	Ian Bennett	TV series
1974	Behind the Legend	Governor William Bligh	TV series- 1 episode
1979-81	Skyways	George Tippett	TV series
1981	Holiday Island	George Tippett	TV series
1981, 1984–85	Prisoner	Dr. Kennedy / Stan Dobson	TV series
1988	Neighbours	John Worthington	TV series
