= The Wraith (1957 film) =

- Based on: 1936 radio play by Graeme-Holder
- Screenplay by: W. Graeme-Holder
- Country of origin: Australia
- Original language: English

Production
- Running time: 30 mins
- Production company: Australian Broadcasting Commission

Original release
- Release: 23 April 1957 (Sydney, live)
- Release: 24 May 1957 (Melbourne, recording)

The Wraith is a live television comedy play presented on Australian television in 1957. Broadcast on ABC, it was originally telecast in Sydney, and shown in Melbourne via a kinescope recording. It was made at a time when Australian drama was rare.

Duration was 30 minutes, in black and white. It was written by W. Graeme-Holder, and had previously been presented on radio during the 1930s. It is not known if the kinescope recording of the television version is still extant.

== Premise ==
"The Wraith" is the name of a mysterious burglar.

Two gentlemen, John and James, are burgling the London flat of Madeleine Bloom, a wealthy actor. They are interrupted by a lady who accuses them of trespass.

== Cast ==
- Leonard Bullen - John
- Normal Cull - James
- Joan Lord - Lady

== Production ==
The play was based on a 1936 radio play that was often performed in the late 1930s. It had been performed on the BBC radio in 1939.

Joan Lord had been in earlier TV plays Twelve Pound Look and Elizabeth Refuses.

== See also ==
- List of live television plays broadcast on Australian Broadcasting Corporation (1950s)
- Take That - First Australian television sitcom.
