= Amahl and the Night Visitors (1957 film) =

- Based on: Amahl and the Night Visitors by Menotti
- Country of origin: Australia
- Original language: English

Production
- Producer: Christopher Muir
- Production company: ABC

Original release
- Release: 25 December 1957

Amahl and the Night Visitors is a 1957 Australian TV play. It was a filmed version of the opera Amahl and the Night Visitors by Menotti. The ABC had previously televised Menotti's The Telephone and this was the second opera they broadcast.

It was broadcast live in Melbourne, recorded, then shown in Sydney. It was presented by members of the Elizabethan Theatre Trust's Australian Opera Company and the Victorian Symphony Orchestra under the direction of Joseph Post.

== See also ==
- List of live television plays broadcast on Australian Broadcasting Corporation (1950s)
