= Albert Lim =

Albert Lim (Singer) 林俊 (Lim Chun)
- Origin: Hong Kong
- Genres: Opera
- Occupation: Baritone

Albert Lim (Traditional Chinese: 林俊) is a Hong Kong Baritone graduated from the Royal College of Music and Hong Kong Academy for Performing Arts.

== Career ==
Graduated from the Hong Kong Academy for Performing Arts and the Royal College of Music postgraduate diploma programme, Lim made his debut as a soloist in 1997, performing Mozart’s C Minor Mass, K.427 with the Hong Kong Bach Choir. Since then, Lim has appeared regularly with the group. He has also collaborated with various vocal ensembles, namely the Hong Kong Oratorio Society, the Learners’ Chorus. His most recent performance was given in conjunction with the Chinese University Chorus, as part of the 330 commemoration of J.S. Bach as well as a featured event of the 2015 Singfest in Hong Kong.

Lim has sung different roles in productions produced by Opera Hong Kong and Musica Viva, two opera companies in Hong Kong. Lim’s repertoire include Figaro from Le Nozze di Figaro, Papageno from Die Zauberflöte, Escamillo from Carmen, Marcello from La Bohème, Ben from Menotti’s The Telephone, and Umeya from Huang Ruo’s opera, Dr. Sun Yat Sen. In 2011, Lim was invited to perform with the Shanghai Symphony Orchestra, representing Hong Kong in the Shanghai EXPO. In 2012, Lim appeared as the featured soloist in Faure's Requiem with the Hong Kong Sinfonietta. Lim performed as a soloist with the Hong Kong Philharmonic Orchestra in 2013.

A versatile singer, Lim is equally at home in the pop music scene. He has shared the stage with a number of Cantopop stars, notably Hacken Lee and the Taiwanese singer, Jeff Zhang. Lim has also recorded music soundtracks for Walt Disney's animated movies, including Lady and the Tramp, Enchanted and Lava in Cantonese. As a devoted Christian, Lim has taken part in the studio recordings produced by ShareHymns Association Limited, a non-profit making Christian music organization in Hong Kong.

== Others ==
While keeping a busy teaching schedule, Lim is currently president of Aria Academy of Music, faculty member of the Hong Kong Academy for Performing Arts and Chinese University of Hong Kong, conductor at the Hong Kong Children's Choir and the assistant chorus master of Opera Hong Kong.
