= Cavalleria rusticana (disambiguation) =

Cavalleria rusticana is an 1890 opera by Pietro Mascagni.

Cavalleria rusticana may also refer to:

- Cavalleria rusticana (short story), an 1883 short story by Giovanni Verga; also a play by him based on his story
- Cavalleria rusticana (1953 film), a 1953 Italian film based on the opera
- Cavalleria Rusticana (1959 film), a 1959 Australian television play based on the opera
- Cavalleria rusticana (1982 film), a 1982 Italian film based on the opera
- Cavalleria Rusticana and Other Stories, a collection of short stories by Giovanni Verga, translated by D.H. Lawrence, first published in 1928.
