= You Can't Win 'Em All (1962 film) =

- Ad in The Age 5 Sep 1962
- Genre: comedy-drama
- Written by: Alun Owen
- Directed by: Patrick Barton
- Country of origin: Australia
- Original language: English

Production
- Producer: Bernard Heron
- Running time: 60 mins
- Production company: ABC

Original release
- Network: ABC
- Release: 5 September 1962 (Melbourne); 3 October 1962 (Sydney)

You Can't Win 'Em All is a 1962 Australian television play directed by Patrick Barton. Filmed in London, it was based on a play by Alun Owen which had been previously filmed by the BBC in 1962.

Filmink called it "a light-hearted comedy adventure closer to a 1940s Humphrey Bogart movie at Warner Bros, complete with colourful support characters, sexy dames and a backlot third world setting."

== Premise ==
British wireless operator Corrigan Blake is stranded in Jamaica. In a bar, he receives an offer to help repair a radio for some revolutionaries in a South American company. Corrigan agrees on the proviso he is paid one thousand dollars.

Corrigan visits the revolutionary compound, under the command of Feliz and Feliz's sister Anna Maria.

Feliz is kidnapped by soldiers led by Manuel Selasco, who once loved Anna Maria. Corrigan decides to rescue him by pretending to be a traitor.

Corrigan succeeds in rescuing Feliz and capturing Selasco. Feliz decides not to kill Selasco in order to humiliate him. A delighted Anna Maria believes Corrigan has joined the revolution, but he tells her he would only let her down.

== Cast ==
- Syd Conabere as Corrigan Blake
- Alan Hopgood as Feliz
- Norman Kaye as Manuel Selasco
- Leon Lissek as Chalo
- James Lynch as Julio
- Judith Thompson as Anna Maria, sister of Feliz
- Christopher Hill as 1st Guard
- Lorenzo Nolan as 2nd Guard
- Roly Barlee
- Carl Bleazby
- Sonia Borg
- Brian Hannan
- Gordon Davis
- Anne Charleston
- Madeleine Howell
- Janet Keyte
- Lyndel Rowe
- Andrew Lodge
- Neil Curnow
- Joseph Segal
- Christine Nolan

== Original Play ==
It was based on a play by Alun Owen, which aired on the BBC in February 1962. Jack Hedley played Corrigan Blake. The Guardian said it "never achieved reality" and had some "surprisingly dull dialogue."

The lead character of the play, Corrigan Blake, featured in a TV series of the same name made by the BBC in 1963. The Guardian said "it falls flat and hard".

== Production ==
It was the first TV play produced by Patrick Barton, an Englishman who had lived in Australia for two years. Most ABC drama in Melbourne until then had been done by William Sterling or Christopher Muir. Barton said the play was different in tone to other works by Owen.

Kevin Bartlett was the designer.

Other Australian TV plays set in South America included Last Call and The Strong are Lonely (1959).

== Reception ==
The quality of the production was criticised.

The Age said "the production was racy to match the play and the hand of the producer, though firm, never intruded. One, however, cannot pass without congratulating actor Sydney Conabere for making the character of Corrigan Blake so completely Corrigan Blake."

Filmink called it "a bizarre experience: all these Australian actors pretending to be South Americans in a backlot jungle, trying to stop their natural accents sneaking through, and Syd Conabere channeling Bogart/Alan Ladd/Dick Powell/John Payne... Indeed, I wish the play had embraced its junkiness to a greater degree: it could have done with more action/sex/tension and less chat. And Syd Conabere, fine an actor as he was, doesn't quite have the charisma the role requires."
