= The Barber of Seville (disambiguation) =

The Barber of Seville is an 1816 opera by Gioachino Rossini.

The Barber of Seville may also refer to:

- The Barber of Seville (play), a 1773 French play by Pierre Beaumarchais
- The Barber of Seville (Paisiello), a 1782 comic opera by Giovanni Paisiello
- The Barber of Seville (1904 film), a French silent film
- The Barber of Seville (1933 film), a French film directed by Hubert Bourlon and Jean Kemm
- The Barber of Seville (1938 film), a German-Spanish musical film
- The Barber of Seville (1944 film), a Woody Woodpecker cartoon
- The Barber of Seville (1947 film), an Italian film
- The Barber of Seville (1948 film), a French film
- The Barber of Seville (1958 film), an Australian telefilm

== See also ==
- Adventures of the Barber of Seville, a 1954 film
- The Ghosts of Versailles, a 1991 opera by John Corigliano
- Rabbit of Seville, a 1950 Looney Tunes theatrical short
