= Funnel Web =

1962 drama television play directed by Bill Bain

- Based on: play by Philip Grenville Mann
- Written by: Philip Grenville Mann
- Directed by: Bill Bain
- Country of origin: Australia
- Original language: English

Production
- Producer: John Garton
- Running time: 60 mins
- Production company: ABC

Original release
- Network: ABC
- Release: 25 April 1962 (Sydney, live)
- Release: 30 May 1962(Melbourne, taped)
- Release: 30 October 1962 (Brisbane)

Funnel Web is a 1962 Australian TV play starring Grant Taylor and written by Phillip Grenville Mann. It screened on the ABC and was a suspense drama.

== Plot ==
A Canadian woman, Nina, is searching for her husband, Max Godfrey, who deserted her years ago. She finds him living in Sydney. Max has also defrauded his business partner. He decides to take steps to get rid of both his ex-wife and former business partner.

== Cast ==
- Grant Taylor as Max Godfrey
- Diana Davidson as Nina Godfrey
- Wendy Playfair as Irene Charlton
- Alastair Duncan as Paul Charlton
- Phillipa Baker as Marion Westlake
- Mary Mackay as Miss Wetherby
- Stewart Ginn as Dt Sgt Lundy
- Ken Hacker as Gleeson
- Philippa Baker

== 1956 British TV version ==
It was based on a story by Phillip Grenville Mann. He originally wrote it as a 30-minute TV play for British TV called "Dead or Alive". This aired in 1956 as part of the anthology series Theatre Royal, hosted by Lilli Palmer. The episode starred Australian actor Ron Randell and was directed by Don Chaffey, who would later work in Australia. Other actors included Ralph Michael, Patricia Driscoll, Lloyd Lamble and John Miller.

Mann expanded the story into a full length stage play, which was performed in Britain.

== Development ==
Mann adapted the story for Australian TV. According to Filmink "A lot of TV plays around this time sound as though they were inspired by Dial M for Murder, which started as a TV play, i.e. tales of murder among the monied classes."

It was the last in a series of live TV plays by Australian authors on the ABC which had been announced in March 1962. The others were:

- Boy Round the Corner
- The House of Mancello
- The Teeth of the Wind
- The Hobby Horse
- Jenny

== Production ==
It was Grant Taylor's second TV performance following Jenny and was shot in Sydney. The set, including two office interiors and a beach house at Avalon, was designed by Francesca Crespi. Technical supervisor John Garton was a veteran of many ABC plays and operas. Director Bill Bain said "the play is an excellent vehicle for actors and producer, being slick, tight and dynamic."

== Reception ==
The Sydney Morning Herald praised "the meticulously chic settings designed by Francesca Crespi (a beach house at Avalon and a Sydney office interior) and the easy-limbed, masterful portrayal of the villain by Grant Taylor".

== See also ==
- List of television plays broadcast on Australian Broadcasting Corporation (1960s)
