= The Twelve-Pound Look =

The Twelve-Pound Look may refer to:

- The Twelve-Pound Look, a 1911 one-act play by J. M. Barrie
- The Twelve Pound Look (1920 film), a British silent version of Barrie's play
- The Twelve-Pound Look (1956 film), an Australian television performance of Barrie's play
