= A Private Island =

- Written by: Chris Gardner
- Directed by: Henri Safran
- Country of origin: Australia
- Original language: English

Production
- Running time: 60 mins
- Production company: ABC

Original release
- Network: ABC
- Release: 9 December 1964 (Sydney)
- Release: 30 December 1964 (Melbourne)

A Private Island is a 1964 Australian television play. It was written by Brisbane author Chris Gardner (real name Marjorie Gardner) and was directed by Henri Safran.

== Premise ==
Set in Sydney, Ben Clayburn is a real estate agent whose two children are grown up and settled. Ben decides to buy an island off the coast of Queensland and live there with his wife. His son Don has other ideas. His daughter wants to go to work to support her artist husband.

== Cast ==
- John Gray as Ben Clayburn
- Marion Johns as Viv
- Brian Young as Don Clayburn
- Lola Brooks as Jean
- Alexander Can
- Patricia Hill
- Roberta Hunt
- Guy Le Claire as Mark

== Production ==
The show was shot in Sydney. Marion Jones, who played the wife, had recently appeared in A Season in Hell for Safran. It was writer Chris Garner's third TV play after Dark Under the Sun and The House of Mancello.

== Reception ==
The Canberra Times said the play "was bogged down with a dull pedestrian script. The basic idea had possibilities but the writer needs to learn about his craft, especially the art of creating characters through the dialogue. The actors were uninteresting."

The Sydney Morning Herald said "For stupefying banality of idea and sentiment it would have been hard to surpass Chris Gardner's homiletic Private Island", saying "the remorseless predictability of the play's action and dialogue must have ended even the most sympathetic viewer's attempt to accept it as other than a moralistic charade."

== Radio version ==
Gardner also adapted the play for radio for the ABC. It aired in 1965 starring Richard Meikle as the agent. Reviewing that production the Sydney Morning Herald said "the players overcame the limitations of script to involve the listener" adding Gardner "wrote from confused values. She tried to present an aging real estate man trying to get away from it all but held back by sense of responsibility. In fact. Dad was held to the treadmill by his son's forgery which left the old man with no choice" arguing that if the writer had "snipped away the sub-plots and cut the thing to a halfhour comment on how people meet the arrows of fate, she would have a play."
