= The Right Person (1957 film) =

- Story by: Philip Mackie
- Directed by: Eric McCleery
- Country of origin: Australia
- Original language: English

Production
- Running time: 30 mins
- Production company: ABC

Original release
- Network: ABC
- Release: 21 August 1957 (Melbourne, live)
- Release: 18 September 1957 (Sydney, taped)

The Right Person is a 1957 Australian television play. It was made at a time when Australian drama production was rare.

It was filmed in ABC's Melbourne studios.

== Plot ==
A suspense play about three people faced with events from the past in present-day Copenhagen.

== Cast ==
- Norman Griffiths
- Laura James
- Carl Bleazby.

== Production ==
The play had previously been shot for English television on the BBC and turned into a short film in 1955 made by Hammer Films.

John Peters, who designed the Australian production, had worked on the film in England. The play was shot in Melbourne with some insert scenes filmed at the Hotel Federal on Collins Street. Frank Few was the cameraman.

Eric McCleery also directed Holiday in Biarritz.

== See also ==
- List of live television plays broadcast on Australian Broadcasting Corporation (1950s)
