= Dark Under the Sun =

- Ad from the Age 23 Mar 1960
- Written by: Chris Gardner
- Directed by: William Sterling
- Country of origin: Australia
- Original language: English

Production
- Running time: 60 mins
- Production company: ABC

Original release
- Network: ABC
- Release: 23 March 1960 (Melbourne)
- Release: 27 April 1960 (Sydney)

Dark Under the Sun is a 1960 Australian TV play. It was written by Brisbane author, Chris Gardner, who also wrote The House of Mancello (1962) and A Private Island (1964). Australian TV drama was relatively rare at the time. The play concerned an interracial romance which led Filmink magazine to think it was "an indication that Australian television was willing to confront some of the nation’s trickier social issues head on." Other Australian TV plays to deal with racial issues included Burst of Summer. However the Aboriginal character is played by a white actor in blackface.

It was aired on ABC and ran for an hour on Wednesday 27 April 1960 at 8.30pm. It was produced in Melbourne.

== Plot ==
In the town of Nombora, a university-educated half-aboriginal man, Jim Robertson, falls for a white woman, his childhood playmate, Julie Handford. Social and family problems begin when they decide to get married. The play is set at a homestead near a Queensland banana plantation.

Beryl Parker is a scheming friend who causes trouble. Julie winds up rejecting Jim.

== Cast ==
- Edward Brayshaw as Jim Robertson
- Elizabeth Goodman as Julie Handford
- Moira Carleton as Grannie Hill
- James Lynch as Les Holland
- Berys Marsh as Beryl Parker
- John Norman as Dave Handford
- Joyce Turner as Mr Handford

== Production ==
Early Australian TV drama production was dominated by using imported scripts but in 1960 the ABC was undertaking what has been described as "an Australiana drive" of producing local stories. In January 1960 the ABC announced the play would be one of several new TV plays from Australian writers. The others included Eye of the Night, The Turning Point and The Slaughter of St Teresa's Day.

The play was written by Chris Gardner, a Queensland author. She had moved from England to Australia eight years previously was living in Woody Point. She started writing when briefly bed-ridden due to a slipped disc then became more serious about it when she joined a Brisbane radio group in 1956. Dark Under the Sun was her first TV play.

Director William Sterling said the play was written in the style of Paddy Chayevsky or Ted Willis - "a familiar social situation being shown in a simple, believable story with recognisable characters appearing in realistic situations and arguing their point of view forcefully without being mere mouthpieces for a particular opinion."

Advertising called it "a dramatic live play by Chris Gardner on the problem of social assimilation in a Queensland community."

== Reception ==
The Age TV reviewer called it "excellent... struck such a telling blow for Australian produced and written drama that it is regrettable that not more than a handful of viewers watched this one hour production." He added Brayshaw "at times his acting was quite brilliant" and thought Goodman "also performed excellently... the drama flowed smoothly and well."

The same paper, when it reviewed the year in Australian television, again called the production "outstanding".
