= Dark Brown =

Dark Brown may refer to:

- Dark brown
- Dark Brown (1957 film), an Australian television film
- Dark Brown (1963 film), another version of the above
