= Jenny (1962 film) =

- Ad from SMH 28 Mar 1962 p 17
- Written by: George F. Kerr
- Directed by: Henri Safran
- Country of origin: Australia
- Original language: English

Production
- Producer: Harrie Adas
- Running time: 75 mins
- Production company: ABC

Original release
- Network: ABC
- Release: 28 March 1962 (Sydney)
- Release: 4 April 1962

Jenny is a 1962 Australian TV drama.

It was a rare early Australian television play to focus on teenagers.

== Plot ==
Jenny is a 16-year-old girl whose father Roger, an actor, and mother Margaret, a television personality, have been separated for 15 months. Jenny has a boyfriend, Michael, a law student.

Margaret tells Jenny she has met a Melbourne businessman, Rex Porter, that she wants to marry.

This sends Jenny out looking for her father and boyfriend. She winds up at a party at Kings Cross being held by beatniks.

She gets a cab driver to take her to The Gap where she intends on committing suicide. However the cab driver talks her out of it and takes Jenny home to her father.

Roger returns and he and Margaret realise how troubled Jenny is. They decide to try again for her sake.

== Cast ==
- Carolyn Keely as Jenny
- Joan Winchester as Margaret Playford
- James Condon as Roger Playford
- Grant Taylor as Rex Porter
- David Yorston as Michael
- Lex Mitchell as the beatnik
- Tony Carere, Joan Morrow and Kerry Collins as beatniks

== Hunger of a Girl ==
The play appears to be based on a stage play written by Kerr called Hunger of a Girl. This play was sponsored by the Elizabethan Theatre Trust and produced by the North Sydney Independent Theatre, starting 13 September 1960. Peter Summerton directed.

The play was set in a house in the Blue Mountains and was about a 17-year-old girl (played by Veronica Rouse) whose parents - one an author of romance novels (Joan Winchester), the other an actor (Leonard Teale) - are separated. The girl reacts badly when her mother falls for another man (Ben Gabriel), who is younger than the mother, who has lived off prostitutes. The girl tries to get rid of the younger lover, even offering herself to a teenage friend (Graham Hill) as a reward for the lover's murder. When that does not work the girl kills the lover herself.

It was very rare at the time for Australian plays to be put on in theatres unless they were plays for children.

=== Reception ===
The Sydney Morning Herald said the first half of the play "reproduces all the features of an English drawing room comedy as it was in the middle 1920s" and was all "commendably smooth." However the reviewer felt the play became contrived in the second half of the play, after the murder, "when the author seeks to examine his characters with compassion."

Another reviewer said Kerr and Summerton "have not tried to provoke the initiation of social action on the problems that the play depicts; rather have they exposed very lucidly facts and reasons backing the behaviour of a proportion of young people."

== Production ==
It was the first of a series of six Australian plays to be produced by the ABC in 1962. The other five were:

- Boy Round the Corner
- The House of Mancello
- Funnel Web
- The Teeth of the Wind
- The Hobby Horse

Patricia Hooker worked as script assistant.

== Reception ==
A critic from the Sunday Sydney Morning Herald called it "first rate drama" until the last five minutes when "it collapsed into nothingness" because it left unanswered the central question, namely "Should the partners of an unsuccessful marriage forgo their own chances of happiness for the sake of their children?... Did author Kerr simply throw up his hands and give the whole thing away?"

The critic from the Sydney Morning Herald said "the play had all the searing truth and genuine emotion of a piece of eminently marketable woman's magazine fiction."

== See also ==
- List of television plays broadcast on Australian Broadcasting Corporation (1960s)
