= Bill Eldridge =

Australian producer

Bill Eldridge was an Australian producer. He worked at ABC radio as an actor and producer. He also produced some early TV plays such as Roundabout. Eldridge was a BBC Radio producer and came to Perth in 1947.

== Select credits ==
- Candida (1951) - radio play - actor
- Deadly Nightshade (1954) - actor
- Camera Club (1957)
- Fair Passenger (1957) - director
- Roundabout (1957) - director
- Symphonie Pastorale (1958) - director
- Seeing Stars (1958) - TV variety show - director
- They Found a Cave (1962) - writer
