= Fidelio (film) =

Fidelio is a 1958 Australian television live recording of the opera Fidelio. It was one of a number of operas presented by the Australian Broadcasting Corporation at the time.

The opera had been performed that year by the Australian Elizabethan Theatre Trust. Sylvia Fisher sang Leonora.

== See also ==
- List of live television plays broadcast on Australian Broadcasting Corporation (1950s)
