= A Dead Secret =

1957 play by Rodney Ackland

- Original language: English
- Written by: Rodney Ackland
- Genre: Crime
- Setting: Willesden, London, 1911

Premiere
- Date: 22 April 1957
- Place: Royal Court Theatre, Liverpool

A Dead Secret is a 1957 crime play by Rodney Ackland. It is a murder drama set in 1911 London and is based on the Seddon murder trial. It premiered at the Royal Court Theatre, Liverpool then transferred to the Piccadilly Theatre in London's West End where it ran for 212 performances. The West End cast included Paul Scofield, Madge Brindley, Dinsdale Landen, Megs Jenkins, Harold Scott, Gretchen Franklin, Arthur Lowe, Maureen Delany and Laidman Browne.

== Plot ==
Insurance agent Frederick Dyson owns a house in London with his wife. Among the lodgers is a misery elderly woman, Miss Lummus, who hoards her money in the house. When she is murdered, Dyson is charged with the crime.

== 1959 British television version ==
A version aired 3 March 1959 as part of British television series ITV Play of the Week. The adaptation was by John McKeller. This version is believed to be lost.

== 1959 Australian television version ==
A Dead Secret
- Country of origin: Australia
- Original language: English

Production
- Running time: 75 mins

Original release
- Release: 21 May 1959 (Melbourne, live)
- Release: 24 June 1959 (Sydney, taped)

A television version aired 21 May 1959 on Australian broadcaster ABC. This version aired live in Melbourne, and was kinescoped for interstate broadcasts. It is not known if the kinescope still exists.

It was made when Australian drama was very rare. It starred Bryce Archer who was in the film Smiley Gets a Gun.

=== Cast ===
- Bruce Archer as Alfie, Miss Lummus' adoptive son
- Kenneth Goodlet as Frederick Dyson
- Elizabeth Wing as Mrs Dyson
- Moira Carlicion as Miss Lummus
- Bettina Kauffman
- Edward Howell
- Campbell Copelin
- Lewis Tegart
- Carol Armstrong

=== Reception ===
The TV critic for the Sydney Morning Herald thought that the "potential dramatic richness" of the play "was not fully exploited" because the director "had little time—or space—to create the atmosphere which can come much more easily to a stage director". However he did think the production "was, without any startling virtues, nevertheless a satisfactory piece of domestic entertainment.

== 1963 Australia radio version ==
A radio version aired 15 December 1963 on Melbourne Australia radio station LO.

== 1963 Australian television version ==
A Dead Secret
- Starring: Ron Haddrick
- Country of origin: Australia
- Original language: English

Production
- Running time: 60 mins

Original release
- Release: 8 May 1963 (Sydney)
- Release: 18 July 1963 (Melbourne)

An Australian television version aired 1963 on ABC.

=== Cast ===
- Ron Haddrick as Frederick Dyson
- Marion Johns as Mrs Dyson
- Lyndall Barbour as dead woman
- Thelma Scott as Henrietta Spicer
- Walter Sullivan as Arthur Lovecraft QC
- Tom Farley as Dyson's Father

== See also ==
- List of live television plays broadcast on Australian Broadcasting Corporation (1950s)

== Bibliography ==
- Wearing, J.P. The London Stage 1950–1959: A Calendar of Productions, Performers, and Personnel. Rowman & Littlefield, 2014.
