= Antony and Cleopatra (1959 film) =

- Ad in The Age 17 Jun 1959
- Based on: play by William Shakespeare
- Written by: Arthur Chipper
- Directed by: Christopher Muir
- Country of origin: Australia
- Original language: English

Production
- Running time: 125 mins
- Production company: ABC

Original release
- Network: ABC
- Release: 17 June 1959 (Melbourne, live)
- Release: 8 July 1959 (Sydney, taped)

Antony and Cleopatra is a 1959 Australian television play based on the play by William Shakespeare.

It was broadcast live in Melbourne then recorded and screened in Sydney. The ABC also broadcast a production of Hamlet at the same time, which was broadcast live in Sydney then recorded and screened in Melbourne. It was the ABC's first live Shakespeare play.

== Cast ==
- Bettie Kauffman as Cleopatra
- Keith Eden as Antony
- Kevin Miles as Caesar
- Laurier Lange as Lepidus
- Edward Howell as Agrippa
- Judith Godden as Charmain
- Paul Bacon as Alexas
- Beverley Dunn as Octavia
- Frank Gatliff as Pompey
- John Morgan as Menas
- Keith Hudson as Eros
- Alan Tobin as Procuecius
- Colin Eaton as Soothsayer
- Philip Stainton as Clown
- Hugh McDermott as first messenger
- George Ogilvie as second messenger
- Alan Hopgood as first soldier
- Alan Morley as second soldier
- Kenneth Goodlet as Enobarus
- Soula Paulay, R de Winter, Antonio Rodrigues and Albert la Guerre as Cleopatra's attendants
- Nevil Thurgood, John Godfrey and Peter Diess as soldiers

== Production ==
Arthur Chipper did the adaptation, which made a number of alterations from the play, including reducing the characters and opening it in Rome not Alexandria.

It was shot at ABC's studios in Rippon Lea. It used a cast of 24, 15 speaking parts, ten sets and 31 scenes. The set was designed by Jon Peters. It was Keith Eden's first performance as a "straight" actor on TV - he was better known as a radio actor. There were 31 scene changes. Keith Clarke did costumes.

== Reception ==
"Janus", the TV critic for The Age thought the play was "not for television."

Another critic for the same paper said it "was a gallant and praiseworthy attempt in the face of heavy odds" but did not think the play suitable for television although he liked the two lead performances.

The Sydney Morning Herald critic wrote that:

Not much of the pomp and poetry came through the rich texture of Shakespeare's language in the... production.. although as a straightforward account of love and war this Melbourne performance Was satisfactory enough. Two things helped to lower the temperature of the love and the language; first, Arthur Chipper's rearrangement of the first half of the play was quite skillful, but the cutting was on a political rather than on a passionate bias, and second, producer Christopher Muir'_s use of cameras and- lighting did little—except in a few scenes — to imaginatively underline the play's mood, atmosphere, and growing tensions.

The Bulletin said "A satisfactory TV treatment of this play is probably impossible. Even more than Hamlet it cries out for space and color. Its conflicting worlds of politics and self-consuming passion are created in images of the utmost scope and vigor, and if a producer cannot match them in physical terms he must concentrate on the richness of the poetry and look continually for the points of tension between the two worlds."

== See also ==
- List of live television plays broadcast on Australian Broadcasting Corporation (1950s)
