= Fair Passenger =

1957 Australian television film

- Based on: play by Aimée Stuart
- Directed by: Bill Eldridge
- Country of origin: Australia
- Original language: English

Production
- Running time: 60 mins
- Production company: ABC

Original release
- Network: ABC
- Release: 17 July 1957 (Melbourne, live)
- Release: 1 September 1957 (Sydney, taped)

Fair Passenger is a 1957 Australian television film which aired on ABC. It was the first one-hour television drama produced in Melbourne, and aired there live on 17 July 1957.

It was described as a "drama of mixed romances".

Although it was kinescoped in order to be shown in Sydney, it is not known if the kinescope still exists. The UK version is lost.

== Plot ==
Erica Tranmore is dissatisfied in her marriage with a quiet adoring husband. She goes to London on the pretext of visiting an old school friend, Meg, but actually to see an infatuated young man, Clive. She meets Rosemary, a young film star, at Meg's flat and sets out to captivate Meg's boss with a screen test.

Rosemary falls in love with Clive. Erica has an unsuccessful screen test and returns home.

== Cast ==
- Philip Stainton as Frank Clayton
- Nicolette Bernard as Meggie Craig
- Beverley Dunn
- Marcia Hart as Erica Tramore
- Walter Brown
- Margaret Wolfit

== Production ==
The show was based on a play by Aimee Stuart. It had been adapted for Australian radio in 1951 1952 and 1954 and for British TV in 1955 as part of anthology series London Playhouse.

The ABC had a site in the Melbourne suburb of Ripponlea. However it did not have normal TV studio facilities yet so the production was filmed at a temporary studio at Coppin Hall in Richmond. (The studio was used for a six-month period from 1 July while the Ripponlea studios were being built. Among the shows made there were variety shows, musicals and the Village Glee Club.)

It was the first hour-long television drama broadcast in Melbourne. Marcia Hart, who was in the cast, had previously appeared in the first hour-long television drama broadcast in Chicago (a production of Gas Light).

== See also ==
- List of live television plays broadcast on Australian Broadcasting Corporation (1950s)
