= The Hobby Horse (film) =

1962 Australian television play

- Ad in The Age 16 May 1962
- Written by: Robert Wales
- Directed by: William Sterling
- Country of origin: Australia
- Original language: English

Production
- Running time: 60 mins
- Production company: Australian Broadcasting Commission

Original release
- Release: 16 May 1962

The Hobby Horse is a 1962 Australian television play which aired on ABC. Broadcast live, it was a drama set on a grazing property in northern New South Wales about a rodeo rider.

Australian TV drama was relatively rare at the time. It was one of a series of six Australian plays produced by the ABC in 1962. The others were:

- Boy Round the Corner
- The House of Mancello
- Funnel Web
- The Teeth of the Wind
- Jenny

== Plot ==
Billy Brocknell gets a job breaking horses on a large property. His former wife, Margaret, is now married to the older property owner. The two meet for the first time since their marriage was annulled by their parents.

== Cast ==
- Wynn Roberts - Billy Brocknell
- Lynn Flanagan - Margaret
- Ken Goodlet
- Douglas Kelly
- Neil Curnow
- Bill Bennett
- Rose Du Clos
- Carole Potter
- Ron Pinnell
- David Mitchell
- Beris Sullivan

== Production ==
It was written by Robert Wales, a Scotsman who had worked for a number of years in Australia. Wales recently won the Coffs Harbour play competition. Wales said he got the idea from two professional horsebreakers he met at a pub in Walcha.

== Reception ==
The TV critic for The Bulletin called it:

Drama with out cause. The horsebreaker came to the station and found his former wife in residence. He had the alternative of leaving immediately, like any sensible man, or grabbing her back. Instead, he was given the task of appearing to want her and yet not want her, to be going to leave and yet not leaving. An hour of soul-searching by people who did not know their own minds for more than one minute at a time. It could have been cabled, with apologies to Sidney Kingsley, "They Knew Not What They Wanted”.
