= Three's Company (film) =

1958 comic opera

Three's Company is a 1958 comic opera by Antony Hopkins broadcast by the Australian Broadcasting Corporation in 1958. It aired in Sydney on August 13, 1958.

== See also ==
- List of live television plays broadcast on Australian Broadcasting Corporation (1950s)
