= Roundabout (1957 film) =

- Ad from 4 Jan 1957
- Based on: play by Michael Clayton-Hutton
- Written by: William Sterling
- Directed by: Bill Eldridge
- Country of origin: Australia
- Original language: English

Production
- Running time: 30 mins
- Production company: ABC

Original release
- Network: ABV-2
- Release: 4 January 1957

Roundabout is a television movie, or rather a live television play, which aired on Australian television in 1957. Broadcast 4 January 1957 on ABC station ABV-2, it is notable as the first example of television drama produced in Melbourne.

It was made at a time when Australian drama production was rare.

"Official" television broadcasting in the city had only begun two months earlier. There seems to have been a Melbourne production and a Sydney production, as happened with The Twelve Pound Look.

== Plot ==
The original TV listing in The Age newspaper described the plot as "a woman's reactions to her husband's suspected affair with another woman".

== Melbourne cast ==
- British actor Patrick Horgan
- Mary Ward as the wife
- Beverley Dunn as the other woman
- Sydney Conabere
- Mira Carleton

== Production ==
The show is based on a 1952 one-act play by Michael Clayton-Hutton.

A Melbourne production was aired live on 4 January 1957 over 30 minutes. Production was by Bill Eldridge. Filming took place at ABC's studios at Ripponlea. Star Patrick Horgan was appearing on stage at the time and had to get in a taxi to the theatre after filming. Beverly Dunn went on to appear in a number of live TV productions.

== Sydney production ==
Roundabout
- Based on: play by Michael Clayton-Hutton
- Directed by: Raymond Menmuir
- Country of origin: Australia
- Original language: English

Production
- Production company: ABC

Original release
- Network: ABC
- Release: 19 February 1957

A Sydney production was directed by Raymond Menmuir and aired February 19, 1957.

== Cast ==
- Roger Climpson as David
- Anne Bullen as Ruth
- Judith Godden as Paula

== See also ==
- The Passionate Pianist
- Box for One
- Tomorrow's Child
- Ending It
- The Shadow of Doubt
- List of live television plays broadcast on Australian Broadcasting Corporation (1950s)
