= The Duke in Darkness =

1942 psychological drama play

- First edition, 1943
- Original language: English
- Written by: Patrick Hamilton
- Genre: Psychological drama
- Setting: Around 1580 in the imaginary French province of Lamorre

Premiere
- Date: 7 September 1942
- Place: Royal Lyceum Theatre, Edinburgh, Scotland

The Duke in Darkness is a 1942 play by Patrick Hamilton. A psychological drama set during the French Wars of Religion, it was first staged on 7 September 1942 at the Royal Lyceum Theatre in Edinburgh. It ran for 72 performances (8 October – 5 December 1942) at the St. James Theatre, London, and had a brief run on Broadway in 1944.

== Plot ==
In 1580, during the French Civil Wars, the Duke of Latteraine has been imprisoned in the Chateau Lamorre for 15 years, together with his servant, Gribaud. The Duke has feigned blindness in the hope that it will aid his eventual escape. As the two men play a tense game of chess, it becomes evident that confinement has caused Gribaud to lose his reason. They are visited by an erstwhile friend named Voulain, now in the service of the enemy, who tries to persuade the Duke that he is still loyal to him. Voulain sets out a daring plan of escape. The Duke must decide whether he can be trusted—and determine what to do with a loyal, mad companion who could be the plan's undoing.

== Production ==
The Duke in Darkness had its premiere on 7 September 1942 at the Royal Lyceum Theatre in Edinburgh. The original London production was presented from 8 October to 5 December 1942 at the St. James Theatre. Running 72 performances, the three-act drama was directed by Michael Redgrave.

- Michael Redgrave as Gribaud
- Leslie Banks as the Duke of Latteraine
- Hugh Burden as Voulain
- D. J. Williams as Chauvet
- Fred Groves as Marteau
- Walter Fitzgerald as the Duke of Lamorre
- Richmond Nairne as the Count d'Aublaye

=== Broadway production ===
The Duke in Darkness was presented at the Playhouse Theatre in New York City from 24 January to 12 February 1944. The cast included Edgar Stehli (Gribaud), Philip Merivale (Duke of Latteraine) and Raymond Burr (Voulain).

== 1948 British TV adaptation ==
The Duke in Darkness was adapted for a live 90-minute BBC television presentation on 11 March 1948. No recording of the broadcast is known to exist.

== 1957 Australian TV adaptation ==
The Duke in Darkness
- Based on: Play by Patrick Hamilton
- Written by: James Carhatt
- Starring: Brian James
- Country of origin: Australia
- Original language: English

Production
- Running time: 60 mins
- Production company: ABC

Original release
- Release: 10 October 1957 (Melbourne, live)
- Release: 13 November 1957 (Sydney, taped)

It was filmed for Australian TV in 1957 at a time when Australian drama production was rare and was the ninth live TV production by ABV-2 (The ABC in Melbourne).

There were several other adaptations of Hamilton plays on Australian television around this time, including Rope and The Governess.

=== Cast ===
- Brian James as the Duke
- Walter Brown
- Syd Conabere
- Lisle Jones
- John Morgan
- Philip Stainton

=== Production ===
It was shot in Melbourne. John Peters designed the set.

== Revised edition ==
Orlando Wells revised and adapted Hamilton's play for a stage revival from 16 April to 13 May 2013 at the Tabard Theatre, London.

== See also ==
- List of live television plays broadcast on Australian Broadcasting Corporation (1950s)
