= Margaret Macnamara (playwright) =

British playwright

Margaret Macnamara (born Margaret Mary Mack; 1874 – 1950) was a British playwright and suffragist whose work promoted feminist, pacifist and socialist values and opposition to eugenics.

== Biography ==
Macnamara was born Margaret Mary Mack in 1874, later changing her name to Macnamara. Her parents were James Andrew Mack and Margaret Mack (née Norris) and she was the eldest of six children. The family lived at various places in Kent and Sussex. Macnamara and her sister Helena Mack took on domestic and childcare responsibilities in the home and cared for their elderly parents. Helena was supported financially by an aunt to attend university which left Macnamara resentful that she had not been given the same opportunity. Helena also wrote and produced plays.

Macnamara and Helena lived in Henfield, Sussex and both belonged to the Henfield Women's Institute. Macnamara was one of the founders of the Institute in 1917 and its recording secretary; the president was Elizabeth Robins.

On her death in 1950 Macnamara left her estate to her niece Sylvia Legge. Legge donated her works to the University of Bristol Theatre Collection.

== Career ==
Macnamara was part of the Fabian Society and the Independent Theatre Movement.

Themes of eugenics, motherhood and poverty are presented in Baby in the Ring which had its first performance in Henfield in 1918. In Safety has pacifist themes. Women's rights are themes of Light Gray or Dark?, The Witch and Love-Fibs.

Nineteenth century novelists Jane Austen, George Eliot and Elizabeth Gaskell had their works adapted by Macnamara. Elizabeth Refuses her adaptation of Jane Austen's Pride and Prejudice was made into a TV programme by the Australian Broadcasting Corporation in 1957. Macnamara's plays were performed in the United States, New Zealand and Australia.

Macnamara held numerous positions in the theatrical world. In 1933 she was appointed Honorary Research Secretary of the Old Vic and was one of the first professional dramaturgs. During the 1920s and 1930s she was active in the British Drama League as Community Theatre Secretary, organiser of drama in schools, and organiser of drama schools for amateurs.

== Plays ==
- The Gates of the Morning (1908)
- Our Little Fancies (1911)
- A Masque of Fashion (1912) - a pageant
- George and Jenny (1917)
- The Baby in the Ring (1918)
- Love–Fibs (1920)
- The Witch (1920)
- Light Gray or Dark? (1920)
- Mrs Hodges (1920)
- The Miss Dodsons that were (1922) - from The mill on the Floss by George Eliot
- In Safety (1924)
- By the Wayside (1924)
- St George and the Turkish Knight (1924)
- Mrs Jupp Obliges (1925)
- Enjoying the Business (1925)
- Yesterday (1926)
- A Masque of Fashion (1926) - a masque
- The Tall, Tall Castle (1927)
- A Penny for the Guy! (1928)
- I Have Five Daughters (1936) - adapted from Pride and Prejudice by Jane Austen
- Elizabeth Refuses (1947) - an adaptation of Pride and Prejudice by Jane Austen
- Wives and Daughters (1947?) - an adaptation of Elizabeth Gaskell's novel of the same name
