= Laidman Browne =

English actor (1896–1961)

Laidman Browne

Laidman Browne (13 September 1896 – 11 September 1961) was an English stage, radio and television actor.

Born in Newcastle upon Tyne in 1896, he was a founder member of the Newcastle Repertory Company in 1925, playing leading parts there until 1931. Later, in 1939, he was a founder member of the BBC Radio Repertory Company, with whom he remained for 12 years, reputedly playing 2,126 roles. In 1949 he was the narrator of Arthur Conan Doyle's Sherlock Holmes story 'The Adventure of the Speckled Band', the first book read on the BBC's long-running series A Book at Bedtime. His stage credits included seasons at the Shakespeare Memorial Theatre and the Open Air Theatre, Regent's Park, together with such West End plays as 1066 and All That (1935-36) and A Dead Secret (1957).

He died in Bournemouth in 1961, aged 64.

== Filmography ==
Year	Title	Role	Notes
1935	Immortal Gentleman	Gambler / Petruchio / Feste	
1937	Dark Journey	Rugge	The Evangelist in the Radio Series, "The Man who Would be King" by Dorothy L.Sayers, 1939–43;
1938	Sixty Glorious Years	Gen. Gordon	
1951	Sherlock Holmes		TV Mini-Series
1952	Wide Boy	Pop	
1952	Ghost Ship	Coroner	
1955	The Dam Busters	Committee Member #3	
1956	My Teenage Daughter	Minor Role	Uncredited
1957	The Birthday Present	Dawson	
1961	Fate Takes a Hand	Maxwell	
1963	The Gentle Terror	Byrne	(final film role)
