= The Skin of Our Teeth (film) =

1959 Australian film by Alan Burke

- Advertisement from SMH 21 Feb 1959
- Based on: play The Skin of Our Teeth by Thornton Wilder
- Written by: Philip Albright
- Directed by: Alan Burke
- Country of origin: Australia
- Original language: English

Production
- Running time: 90 mins

Original release
- Release: 25 February 1959 (Sydney)
- Release: 6 May 1959 (Melbourne)

The Skin of Our Teeth is a 1959 Australian television play based on the play by Thorton Wilder. It starred John Ewart.

== Premise ==
The story of life on Earth as lived by Mr and Mrs Antrobus; their two children; and their maid, Sabina.

== Cast ==
- John Ewart as Henry
- Leonard Teale as Mr Antrobus/Mr Everyman
- Aileen Britton as Mrs Antrobus/Mrs Everyman
- Diana Davidson as Sabina the maid
- Beryl Marshall as Gladys
- Robert Hunt as Fortune Teller
- Nick Tate as Telegraph Boy

== Production ==
The film was directed by Alan Burke, who had directed a production of Skin of Our Teeth on stage in Canberra in 1953 and had spent a day talking to Wilder in the US at the latter's New Haven home. Burke had met him through a letter of introduction while on a UNESCO scholarship. Burke considered the meeting with Wilder one of the most important of his life.

"He is the most knowledgeable man I've ever met," said Burke. "He is a great humanist and has great faith in mankind."

Two sets were used: one for the Antrobus house the other for Atlantic City boardwalk.

== Reception ==
Burke said although the play had "tiny ratings... it represented the big break-through in the production of television plays."

== See also ==
- List of live television plays broadcast on Australian Broadcasting Corporation (1950s)
