= Pat Twohill =

Australian actor (1915–1989)

- Born: Edmund Patrick Twohill; 22 October 1915
- Died: 7 October 1989 (aged 73)
- Occupations: Actor, radio announcer
- Years active: 1937–1968
- Known for: Forty Thousand Horsemen (1940); The Adventures of Long John Silver (1956–1957)
- Spouse: Thora Lumsdaine (m. 26 January 1940)
- Children: 5
- Relatives: Jack Lumsdaine (father-in-law)

Edmund Patrick Twohill (22 October 1915 – 7 October 1989) was a New Zealand actor and radio announcer who worked extensively in Australian film, radio and theatre, often under the name John Sherwood.

Twohill went to England aged 21 and was cast in the second lead role in a boxing film with John Mills called Only Pain is Real. It was cancelled due to the war and he returned home.

He is best known for his role in the classic war film in Forty Thousand Horsemen (1940) although this has been described as a "nothing part". After this he took the stage name John Sherwood. He said he did this to avoid confusion over the spelling of his real name.

Twohill had a long association with radio station 2SM as an announcer.

== Personal life ==
Twohill met his future wife, Thora Lumsdaine, a model and radio actor, while on a photographic shoot for a cruise line. She was the only child of songwriter and radio star, Jack Lumsdaine. They were married on 26 January 1940, at St Mary's Cathedral, Sydney. They had five children together.

== Filmography ==
=== Film ===
Year	Title	Role	Notes
c.1936	Only Pain is Real		(cancelled)
1937	The Avenger	Solicitor	
1940	Forty Thousand Horsemen	Larry	
1944	The Rats of Tobruk		(as John Sherwood)
1956	Shearing Time at Billabong	Narrator	Short film
1958	G'day Digger!	The Bodgie	Short film (as John Sherwood)
1961	Bungala Boys		(as John Sherwood)
1968	The Drifting Avenger (aka Kôya no toseinin)	Carson	(as John Sherwood)

=== Television ===
Year	Title	Role	Notes
1956–1957	The Adventures of Long John Silver	Governor Sir Henry Strong	10 episodes
1967	Homicide	Francis Mullins	1 episode

== Radio ==
- The Irwin Family (1941)
