= Dinner with the Family =

1959 Australian TV play

- Based on: play by Jean Anouilh
- Written by: Philip Albright
- Directed by: Christopher Muir
- Country of origin: Australia
- Original language: English

Production
- Running time: 75 mins
- Production company: ABC

Original release
- Network: ABC
- Release: 26 August 1959 (Melbourne, live)
- Release: 2 September 1959 (Sydney, taped)

Dinner with the Family is a 1959 Australian TV play. Australian TV drama was relatively rare at the time. It featured English star Jessie Matthews in her first Australian TV appearance – she was touring the country at the time – and was shot in Melbourne.

== Plot ==
A young man, Georges, married for money and is unhappy because he has fallen in love with Isabelle. To escape from reality one night he hires actors to play his parents and a butler and invites over Isabelle. However, George's parents are determined to save their son's marriage, and turn up with George's worthless friend Jacques. Barbara is Jacques' wife.

== Cast ==
- Tony Brown as Georges
- Joy Mitchell as Isabelle
- Alan Tobin as Jacques
- Jessie Matthews as Madam de Montrachet
- Paul Bacon as Delmonte
- June Brunell(e) (credited with an ending "e") as Barbara, wife of Georges' friend
- Marcia Hart
- Laurie Lange

== Production ==
The play had recently been performed in Little Theatre in Melbourne starring Sheila Florence. It was announced in July 1959 that the ABC would film it with Jessie Matthews playing Florence's role. Star June Brunell had recently returned from England where she appeared in The Flying Doctors TV series.

== Reception ==
The Sydney Morning Herald called it "a brave, but not really successful attempt to bridge the gap between quintessential theatre on the one hand, and the television screen on the other... Christopher Muir's production was precise, well-planned, and often Imaginative."

The Age TV critic said "it was not the sort of play to set the Yarra on fire" but felt it was strong in the scenes in which Matthews appeared, although her role was relatively small.

== See also ==
- List of live television plays broadcast on Australian Broadcasting Corporation (1950s)
