= They Found a Cave =

- Directed by: Andrew Steane
- Written by: James Pearson; William Eldridge
- Based on: novel by Nan Chauncy
- Produced by: Charles E. Wolnizer
- Starring: Beryl Meekin; Mervyn Wiss
- Cinematography: Mervyn Gray
- Edited by: Robert Walker; Alan Harkness
- Music by: Peter Sculthorpe; Larry Adler (harmonica)
- Production company: Visatone Island Pictures
- Distributed by: Columbia Pictures (Aust); Children's Film Foundation (UK)
- Release date: 20 December 1962
- Running time: 61 minutes
- Country: Australia
- Language: English

They Found a Cave is a 1962 Australian children's adventure film directed by Andrew Steane. The film was originally made from a book by the same name by author Nan Chauncy. In 2010, a company called Argosy Films set up a website to find the production crew and actors/actresses of They Found a Cave and Bungala Boys for the 50th anniversary.

== Plot ==
Four English orphans – Cherry, Nigel, Brick and Nippy – migrate to Tasmania, to the care of their Aunt Jandie on her farm outside Hobart. Their arrival is greeted with enthusiasm by young farm boy Tas, and weeks of exploration and good times follow before Aunt Jandie enters hospital, leaving the children in the care of Ma and Pa Pinner, her foreman and housekeeper.

A few days of tyrannical treatment by the Pinners force the children to seek refuge in a secret cave, where they set up home to await the return of Jandie. Despite Pa's repeated efforts to recapture them, it is here the children stay until Nigel's secret trip to town uncovers a plot by the Pinners to abandon the farm and swindle Aunt Jandie.

== Cast ==
- Beryl Meekin as Ma Pinner
- Mervyn Wiss as Pa Pinner
- Barbara Manning as Aunt Jandie
- Anne Davies as Cherry
- Christopher Horner as Tas
- Michael Nation as Nigel
- Michael Woolford as Nippy
- Peter Conrad as Brick
- Michael Boddy as Sergeant Bentley
- Cecily McKinley as Mrs Clandy
- Joseph Smith as Bluey

== Production ==
The Australian Council for Children's Film and Television had been campaigning for locally made children's films on Australian subjects. In 1961, Island Film Services, a Tasmania company formed by Charles E. Wolnizer, co-produced the film with Visatone Television. It was based on a popular children's novel by Nan Chauncy.

The lead actors were selected out of 500 children.

The film was shot in south-east Tasmania in the summer and autumn of 1961 over seven months with interiors done at Elwick Showground in Hobart and some interiors done in Sydney. The railway footage was on the north coast of Tasmania and at New Town Station. Most of the cast and crew were Tasmanian. As the camera equipment was noisy during filming a lot of the dialogue was overdubbed in post-production. Director Andrew Steane was former head of the Tasmanian Department of Film Production.

Larry Adler recorded harmonica for the music score while touring Australia. Tasmanian composer Peter Sculthorpe was commissioned to write the score for the film. The main theme consists of a short catchy melody that provided foundational material for other music in the film. He later reworked this popular theme as a piano piece, Left Bank Waltz by which this music is now more commonly known.

The film held its world premiere at the Odeon Theatre, Hobart on 20 December 1962.

== Reception ==
The film was positively reviewed but was not a success at the box office.
