= The Teeth of the Wind =

1962 Australian TV film

- Advertisement from The Age 2 March 1962
- Written by: John Cameron
- Country of origin: Australia
- Original language: English

Production
- Producer: Christopher Muir
- Production company: Australian Broadcasting Commission

Original release
- Release: 2 May 1962 (Melbourne)
- Release: 15 May 1962 (Sydney)
- Release: 16 October 1962 (Brisbane)

The Teeth of the Wind is a 1962 television play broadcast by the Australian Broadcasting Corporation. It was written by John Cameron who had written Outpost (1959) which had screened on American television.

It was shot in Melbourne and set in Africa and concerns local politics.

== Plot ==
In a new African republic, Zambotu, a United Nations force holds the elected president and vice president in protective custody under the responsibility of an Australian officer Frank Andrews, who is leading a United Nations Command.

The officer romances Dr Pearson, makes friends with some people experienced with Africa (Kurt Ludescher and Mary Ward), and meets President Ngimba (Keith Eden). Ngimba is English educated and was voted into power by a large majority. The colonists favor the vice president, Kurobe.

Ngimba and Kurobe are held in protective custody following clashes between supporters of both. Andrews hears arguments from his friends, Peter and Mary Vender, experienced in Africa. He also hears from Peter Vender ia mining tycoon opposed to local independence who is a supporter of Kurobe. A doctor, Pearson, makes Andrews realise that the people support Zambotu.

The UN releases Kurobe but Andrews has to keep Nigmba in custody. Andrews grows more sympathetic to Ngimba. Ngimba's supporters march on the presidential palace to release him and Frank Andrews considers ordering his troops to open fire. He decides to lay down his arms and the locals take charge. The weapons are used to kill some women.

== Cast ==
- Alan Hopgood as Frank Andrews
- Roly Barlee as Kandaro
- Keith Eden as President Ngimba
- Joan Harris as Doctor Pearson
- Kurt Ludescher as Peter Vender
- Mary Ward as Mary Vender

== Production ==
It was one of a series of six Australian plays produced by the ABC in 1962. The others were:

- Boy Round the Corner
- The House of Mancello
- Funnel Web
- The Hobby Horse
- Jenny

The play was John Cameron's follow up to his successful Outpost. It was based on the experience of Dr Ivan Smith, an Australian who worked as Chief United Nations representative during the Congo Crisis in November 1961. He had been attacked by mobs and had to be rescued.

Cameron said, "the play attempts to explore the problem in human terms rather than the stark black and white of an ideological or racial clash. It examines the tragedy of people caught up in this conflict, each conscious of his own rights, each resentful of the claimed conflicting rights of others."

Cameron said "the play is essentially about people forced into an environment of crisis rather than the stark blac and white issue of a racial clash. I looked for the sort of tough military situation in which a certain decision cold result in a court martial, but with circumstances that could win sympathy for the officer. The Congo was very much in the news at the time I wrote the play. So The Teeth of the Wind is set "somewhere in Africa" and deals with conflicting interests between two cultures."

== Reception ==
The Bulletin gave the play a harsh review saying "the net result was neither drama nor documentary. It was Blue Hills moved to Africa, but with a less accurate presentation of the pros and cons than Gwen Meredith provides in her more intense moments."
