= Treason (1959 film) =

1959 television film directed by William Sterling

- Genre: WW2, drama
- Based on: play by Saunders Lewis
- Directed by: William Sterling
- Country of origin: Australia
- Original language: English

Production
- Production company: ABC

Original release
- Network: ABC
- Release: 16 December 1959 (Melbourne, live)
- Release: 13 January 1960 (Sydney, taped)

Treason is a 1959 Australian television live drama, which aired on ABC about the 20 July plot during World War Two. Originally broadcast 16 December 1959 in Melbourne, a kinescope ("telerecording") was made of the program and shown in Sydney on 13 January 1960. It was an adaptation of a stage play by Welsh writer Saunders Lewis, which had previously been adapted as an episode of BBC Sunday-Night Theatre.

== Premise ==
Set during World War II. A group of officers, believing Germany to be losing the war, plan to assassinate Adolf Hitler so they can negotiate peace with the Allies.

Hofacker tells Albrecht he is worried Germany will lose the war; Albrecht thinks that will only happen through treachery. Hofacker ends a romantic relationship with Countess Else. Hofacker becomes involved in a plot to kill Hitler along with von Stulpnagel and von Kluge. However the plot is unsuccessful. Albrecht deduces Hofacker's involvement but tells Else if she sleeps with him Hofacker will be freed.

== Cast ==
- Frank Thring as General Karl Albrecht, chief of German Secret Police
- Brian James as Colonel Caesar von Hofacker
- June Brunell as Countess Else von Dietlof, secretary to the Military Governor of France
- Frank Gatliff as General Otto von Stülpnagel
- Edward Howell as Field-Marshal Günther von Kluge
- Wynn Roberts
- Edward Brayshaw
- Dennis Miller as Orderly

== Production ==
George F. Kerr wrote a radio play on this topic which was broadcast on the ABC in 1958.

Saunders Lewis originally wrote the play in Welsh for performance in 1958. It was translated into English for the 1959 British TV version.

The play was produced live in the Melbourne studios of the A.B.C. Director William Sterling called it "a study in mental conflict rather than a play of action and, therefore, particularly suited to TV close-up treatment."

Authentic German decorations for the play, as well as the Graf Spee's flag, were lent by the Military Collectors' Club, Melbourne. Scenes which take place in a luxury French hotel were pre-filmed in a Melbourne hotel.

It was Frank Thring's Australian television play debut.

== Reception ==
The Age called it "one of the very few top line dramas yet presented on Australian TV."

The Sunday Sydney Morning Herald said Thring gives "an impressive performance" being "closely matched in honours by the sensitive work" of Howell.

The daily Sydney Morning Herald said the production was "stylish and forceful" in which "the big four male roles offered fascinating contrast in temperament and motives."

According to Filmink "Thring is everything you want in a Nazi villain in Treason – intense, shrewd, lecherous, smart. He doesn’t overplay, he adjusts for the camera, he has charisma. It’s very good work. Brian James is also excellent."

== See also ==
- Blue Murder - Another ABC TV drama play of 1959
- Misery Me - Another ABC TV drama play of 1959
- List of live television plays broadcast on Australian Broadcasting Corporation (1950s)
