= The House by the Stable =

- Written by: Charles Williams
- Country of origin: Australia
- Original language: English

Production
- Running time: 45 mins
- Production company: ABC

Original release
- Network: ABC
- Release: 20 December 1959 (Melbourne)
- Release: 24 December 1959 (Sydney)

The House by the Stable is a 1959 Australian TV play. It was a nativity play for Christmas and was filmed in Melbourne.

== Cast ==
- Brian James as Man
- Sydney Conabere
- Patricia Kennedy
- Beverley Dunn
