= Mary Ward (actress) =

Australian actress (1915–2021)

- Mary Ward in the TV series Prisoner (also known as Prisoner: Cell Block H) as Mum Brooks in 1979.
- Born: Mary Lorraine Ward; 6 March 1915; Fremantle, Western Australia, Australia
- Died: 19 July 2021 (aged 106); Melbourne, Victoria, Australia
- Other name: Mary Ward Breheny
- Occupations: Actress; radio announcer; commercial spokeswoman; media personality
- Years active: 1949–2000 (Film and television); 1939–1945 (Radio); 1933–1991 (Theatre)
- Known for: Prisoner; Sons and Daughters; The Henderson Kids

Mary Lorraine Ward (6 March 1915 – 19 July 2021), also known as Mary Ward Breheny, was an Australian actress of stage, television, and film and radio announcer, singer and media personality and publicist. Her career spanned seven decades. Ward trained in England and Australia, and worked in both countries.

Ward during the outbreak of World War II, was in high demand as a stage actress in England, before returning to Australia where she worked in local theatre, and became one of the first female radio announcers at the ABC in Australia, billed as the Forces Sweetheart on Radio Australia.

At ABC Television, she appeared in a number of filmed stage plays, as well as featuring in Australian films, both made-for-television and theatrical, including the film Amy.

She is perhaps best known—both locally and internationally for her stints as an actress in two television soap opera roles, portraying elderly characters including Prisoner, as "Mum" Jeanette Brooke, who was an original cast member in 1979 and appeared sporadically in the series until 1981. Ward subsequently featured briefly in soap opera Sons and Daughters in 1983 as Dee Morrell, in which she was classified as a recurring guest role (season 2 - Episodes 305–337).

Ward post-Sons and Daughters, continued to have small guest roles in serials like The Young Doctors, Neighbours and Blue Heelers and retired in 2000, and in 2020, residing in Melbourne, turned 105 years old, and was at the time stated as being "possibly Australia's oldest living actress".

== Biography ==
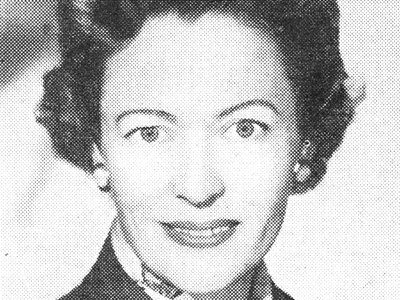
Ward, during her early broadcasting stint in England at the BBC in 1940

=== Early life and career in Britain ===
Ward was born in Fremantle, Western Australia on 6 March 1915, her father was a pearler, who later became the town publican.

Ward attended boarding school and began acting professionally shortly after leaving high school, and later studied at the Perth drama school, where she befriended mining magnate Lang Hancock. She also studied in Britain, and worked as a teacher of elocution and meeting Lionel Logue who was a speech therapist who helped King George VI, overcome his stutter. Ward travelled to England in 1933, where she worked in England repertory, with contemporaries Trevor Howard and John McCallum and also in television and film, before returning to Australia in 1940, working at the Minerva Theatre and became alongside Dorothy Crawford (the sister of television impresario Hector Crawford) one of the first female radio announcers for the Australian Broadcasting Corporation (then Commission) during the war, where she was billed as "The Forces Sweetheart", whilst also appearing radio play productions.

She returned to England in 1948, to pursue work in radio, stage, television and film, and appeared in the first televised serial production at ITV and featured in television commercials doing sewing demonstrations, sponsored by Vogue, while also performing parts for the British Broadcasting Corporation, and appeared in a cameo role in the 1949 film, Eureka Stockade.

Ward made her first television appearance as a minor character in detective series The Vise - originally titled Saber of London - in 1954, and in the television movie The High-Flying Head the following year. She had starring roles in the television movies Marriage Lines and The Tower.

=== Career: television, stage and film ===
She began working in television full-time in Australia after having returned in 1956, firstly working at the ABC, whilst continuing a successful media career, and being the first woman to present fashions on the field, in the 1960s at the annual Melbourne Cup spring racing carnival.

Ward featured at commercial stations, in serials from 1970s with Andrew McFarlane, Robert Bettles and Tom Farley (actor) in 1977. Harness Fever would later appear as a two-part episode, Born to Run, on Wonderful World of Disney in 1979. She continued her stage work in the 1970s with the Melbourne Theatre Company, remaining with the company until 1983, and performing in a David Williamson stage production.

=== Prisoner and Sons and Daughters ===
In 1979, Ward first appeared in one of her best known roles, "Mum" (Jeanette) Brooks, on the popular soap opera Prisoner. She portrayed an elderly institutionalised inmate, serving an eighteen-year prison sentence for the euthanisation of her terminally-ill husband Jim Brooks. When the filming schedule for the series increased from one to two hours per week in 1979, she and co-star Carol Burns decided to leave the series. However, her character remained a popular one during the show's early years, and she reprised her role occasionally until her character died off-screen in 1983. She starred with a number of her fellow Prisoner co-stars in the 1981 television movie I Can Jump Puddles as a character called Mrs. Birdsworth.

She was given the prominent role as scheming Dee Morrell in Sons and Daughters during 1983.

=== The Hendersons ===
Ward starred in the 1985 television series The Henderson Kids and its 1987 follow-up series The Henderson Kids II.

=== Later film and TV ===
During the late-1980s, she had supporting roles in films Jenny Kissed Me and Backstage as well as appearing in more soap guest roles including G.P. and Neighbours in 1989. After starring in the 1989 television movie Darlings of the Gods, she returned again to the theatre, with the exception of an appearance in the television series The Damnation of Harvey McHugh in 1994, and appearing in the film Amy in 1997. In 1991, she appeared in the play Alive and Kicking.

Between 1999 and 2000, she played the recurring character Betty Withers in the police drama Blue Heelers. She retired from the industry in 2000.

=== Death ===
Ward died on 19 July 2021, aged 106, in Melbourne, Victoria.

== Filmography ==
=== Film ===
Year	Title	Role	Notes
1949	Eureka Stockade	Lady Hotham	Feature film
1949	That Dangerous Age	Nurse	Feature film, UK. Released in the US as If This Be Sin
1975	Born To Run aka 'Harness Fever'	Aunt Marian Castle	Feature film
1976	Cry Your Purple Heart Out	Mike	Feature film, US. Also known as How To Score With Girls
1985	Jenny Kissed Me	Grace	Feature film
1986	Backstage	Geraldine Wollencraft	Feature film
1997	Amy	Mrs. Mullins	Feature film

=== Television ===
Year	Title	Role	Type
1951	I Was a Stranger	Official	TV film, UK
1954	The Vise	Guest role: Mrs Diana Campbell	TV series UK, 1 episode
1955	The High-Flying Head	Mrs Taylor	TV film, UK
1957	Roundabout	The Wife	Teleplay
1957	The Twelve Pound Look	Kate	ABC Teleplay
1958	Gaslight	Elizabeth	TV play
1958	Captain Carvallo	Smila Darde	Teleplay
1959	The Lark	Queen Yolande	Teleplay
1962	Marriage Lines	Lysette Eggerton	TV film
1962	The Teeth of the Wind	Mary Vender	Teleplay
1963	The Hot Potato Boys	Millicent Mayne	ABC Teleplay
1965	The Tower	Hester Fortescue	ABC Teleplay
1965	Otherwise Engaged	Dorothy	TV film
1974	This Love Affair	Guest role: Hannah Galbraith	ABC TV series, 1 episode 9: "This Year, Next Time
1974	Rush	Guest role: Mrs Hawk	ABC TV series, 1 episode
1975–1976	Homicide	Guest roles: Mrs Parsons / Margaret Lennox / Mrs Phillips	TV series, 3 episodes
1976	The Judging Ring	Role unknown	ABC TV film
1976	Power Without Glory	Guest role: Edith	ABC TV miniseries, 1 episode
1978	Cop Shop	Recurring Guest role: Emma Hudson	TV series, 2 episodes
1979; 1981	Prisoner	Regular role: Janette 'Mum' Brooks	TV series, 33 episodes aka 'Prisoner: Cell Block H' and 'Caged Women'
1979	The Franky Doyle Story	Mum Brooks	TV film
1979	The Wonderful World of Disney	Aunt Marian Castle	TV series US, 2 episodes 'Born To Run' aka 'Harness Fever'
1980	Skyways	Joan Sloan	TV series
1981	The Young Doctors	Recurring Guest role: Mrs Wilson	TV series
1981	I Can Jump Puddles	Mrs Birdsworth	ABC TV series, 1 episode
1982	A Country Practice	Thelma Thomas	TV series, 2 episodes: The Seeds of Discontent (Parts 1 & 2)
1983	Sons and Daughters	Recurring role: Dee Morrell	TV series, 22 episodes
1984	Hot Pursuit	Role unknown	TV series, 1 episode: Steel Trap
1985	The Henderson Kids	Recurring Guest role: Mrs Cathcart	TV series, 2 episodes
1987	The Henderson Kids II	Recurring Guest role: Mrs Cathcart	TV series, 2 episodes
1989	Neighbours	Recurring Guest role: Mrs Granger	TV series, 3 episodes
1989	G.P.	Guest role: Jessie McLean	ABC TV series, 1 episode
1989	Darlings of the Gods	Barbara Ward	ABC TV mini-series
1992	The Late Show	Lady Frontbottom	ABC TV series, 1 episode of The Olden Days (edited from Rush)
1994	The Damnation of Harvey McHugh	Guest role: Ivy	ABC TV series, 1 episode
1999–2000	Blue Heelers	Recurring Guest role: Betty Withers	TV series, 3 episodes
