= Hamlet (1959 film) =

1959 Australian TV play by Royston Morley

- Advertisement from The Age 27 Sep 1961
- Based on: Hamlet; 1599 play by William Shakespeare
- Written by: Royston Morley
- Directed by: Royston Morley
- Country of origin: Australia
- Original language: English

Production
- Producer: Royston Morley
- Running time: 120 mins
- Production company: ABC
- Budget: £2,500

Original release
- Network: ABC
- Release: 13 June 1959 (Sydney, live)
- Release: 22 July 1959 (Melbourne, taped)

Hamlet is a 1959 Australian TV play starring William Job and produced by Royston Morley.

It was one of the first two productions of Shakespeare transmitted by ABC, the other being Anthony and Cleopatra.

== Cast ==
- William Job as Hamlet
- Henry Gilbert as the King
- Georgie Sterling as the Queen
- Owen Weingott as Laertes
- Delia Williams as Ophelia
- Gordon Glenwright as the Gravedigger
- Douglas Hayes as the Gravedigger
- James Lynch as Bernado
- Grahame Webb as Francisco / Attendant
- Frank Taylor as Horatio
- Vaughan Tracey as Marcellus
- Charles McCallum as Voltemand / Priest
- Geoffrey King as Polonius
- John Fegan as Ghost
- Maurice Travers as Rosencrantz
- James Elliott as Guildenstern
- Lou Vernon as the Player King
- Dennis Carroll as Player Queen
- John Hurrell as Lucianus / Osric
- Tony Arpino as Norwegian Captain
- Geoffrey Hill as Fortinbras
- Ria Sohier as Attendant
- Anne Kelly as Attendant
- Evelyn Kopfer as Attendant
- John Brock as Attendant
- David Bryant as Attendant
- Kevin Williams as Attendant
- Gary Deacon as Attendant

== Production ==
William Job had played Hamlet on stage in Adelaide in 1952. He then went to England and Canada and had only recently returned to Australia, appearing in a TV production of The Seagull. It was Georgie Sterling's third TV appearance after The Multi-Coloured Umbrella and Sorry Wrong Number.

The show used some basic special effects to create the ghosts.

Owen Weingott helped choreograph the fight scene.

The production had a ten-minute intermission.

== Reception ==
The production was well received. The Australian Woman's Weekly called it "two hours of engrossing TV... It was just pleasure and wonderful entertainment. Even if you didn't like Shakespeare, any televiewer would appreciate the notable production and camera work.... A most satisfying night of TV."

A critic from the Sunday Sydney Morning Herald said that it "proved that Shakespeare can be successfully translated to television" with Morley's direction responsible for "much of the credit... he kept the field of action small, relying on _closeups to intensify the drama. I also thought that William Job's portrayal of the young and tragic Dane was outstanding... A night to remember"

A critic from the daily Sydney Morning Herald thought the production suffered from "the skimping of preparation time, the skimping of histrionic talent, and the skimping of imagination and subtlety" although it said Job's performance was one of "sensitiveness, vision and skill".

The critic from The Age thought it was much better than Anthony and Cleopatra.

The Bulletin thought the tragedy of the play "shrank to middle-class size; Hamlet was a G.P.S. boy angry and hurt by what had been going on at home during term" but felt "the production was sound enough—even, in places, admirable."

It was repeated in 1961 and 1964.

== See also ==
- List of live television plays broadcast on Australian Broadcasting Corporation (1950s)
