= The Telephone (1956 film) =

- Based on: The Telephone by Menotti
- Starring: Marie Tysoe; Kevin Mills
- Country of origin: Australia
- Original language: English

Production
- Producer: George Trevare
- Running time: 30 mins
- Production company: ABC

Original release
- Release: 20 December 1956

The Telephone is a 1956 Australian television play. It was a filmed version of the opera The Telephone by Menotti. It was the first of many operas broadcast by the ABC. It went for 25 minutes and only featured two people, played by Marie Tysoe and Kevin Mills.

== Premise ==
Ben attempts to marry Lucy but she keeps gossiping on the telephone. Ben decides to propose to her on the phone.

== Cast ==
- Kevin Mills as Ben
- Marie Tysoe as Lucy

== Background ==
Tysoe and Mills had performed the opera together many times in 1953 and 1954, on stage and on radio.

Marie Tysoe later recalled making the film:

It was done live to air from the radio studio at Kings Cross. The OB Van was parked at Kellett Street, and I remember all the cables going through the windows down to the van. The Sydney Symphony Orchestra was there. We had a marvellous producer, George Trevare, and it all went without a hitch. I actually sang this opera before for a group of singers called the Sydney Opera Group. The ABC – that is Tony Hughes or Werner Baer - probably knew about that, and I got the call. It was an ideal opera to start off on television, as it only had 2 performers and was a relatively simple set and not many props. During rehearsal I remember the producer asking me what I was going to wear. The conductor and one of the stage managers took me to a boutique shop at Kings Cross, and they bought an elegant dress for me to wear on the production.

== See also ==
- List of live television plays broadcast on Australian Broadcasting Corporation (1950s)
