= Philip Albright =

American actor and writer

Philip Albright (died 21 July 1959), was an American actor and writer who worked for a number of years in Australia. He came to Australia in 1949 to appear in Dream Girl on stage and decided to stay, becoming a writer at the ABC, on radio and TV. He was one of the key radio writers for Ron Roberts Productions.

He wrote some of the first TV dramas in Australia. He died in 1959 and his play The Break was produced after his death.

== Select credits ==
- Dream Girl - actor
- His Excellency (1958) - TV play - writer
- Sorry, Wrong Number (1958) - TV play - writer
- Lady in Danger (1959) - TV play - writer
- The Skin of Our Teeth (1959) - TV play - writer
- Dinner with the Family (1959) - TV play - writer
- The Strong Are Lonely (1959) - TV play - writer
- Captain Carvallo (1959) - TV play - writer
- The Bust (1959) - play - writer
- The Break (1962) - play - writer
