= Captain Carvallo =

Captain Carvallo is a traditional comedy play in three acts by Denis Cannan, telling the story of a philandering young army officer, Captain Carvallo.

The comedy was an immediate success when it opened at the St. James Theatre on 9 August 1950, as the second production under Sir Laurence Olivier's management.

A television production of the play was broadcast on the BBC the following year, with Patrick Macnee in the lead. Cannan adapted the play himself for a Rediffusion production later that decade. In 1988 the play was revived at the Greenwich Theatre. A version aired on Australian television in 1958.

== Plot ==
Smila Darde, wife of Caspar Darde, a farmer and lay preacher who is also a partisan, is asked for billet Captain Carvallo, an enemy officer. Her husband and his fellow partisan, Professor Winke, a biologist, are commanded to kill Carvallo but they discover they like him too much.

== Original production ==
The play was first tried out in March 1950 at the Bristol Old Vic, where Cannan was acting at the time. A few months later, Laurence Olivier boldly restaged the play – billed as a "traditional comedy" – at the St James's theatre in London, with James Donald in the lead role, opposite Diana Wynyard. It was a great success, although Cannan preferred the Bristol production. "His play shimmers with ideas wittily juxtaposed, and it is funnier than the Crazy Gang", wrote the critic Harold Hobson.

=== Original cast (St. James Theatre, 1950) ===
| Character | Actor |
|---|---|
| Captain Carvallo | James Donald |
| Smilja Darde | Diana Wynyard |
| Professor Winke | Peter Finch |
| Caspar Darde | Richard Goolden |
| Private Gross | Thomas Heathcote |
| Anni | Jill Bennett |
| The Baron | Anthony Pelly |

== 1958 Australian TV version ==
Captain Carvallo
- Genre: comedy
- Based on: play by Dennis Cannan
- Directed by: William Sterling
- Country of origin: Australia
- Original language: English

Production
- Cinematography: Ray Hammond
- Running time: 60 mins
- Production company: ABC

Original release
- Release: 21 May 1958 (Melbourne, live)
- Release: 16 June 1958 (Sydney)

It was the first "live" play produced from the new studios of the A.B.C. in Melbourne, which had opened on 21 May 1958.

=== Cast ===
- Neil Fitzpatrick as Carvallo
- Mary Ward
- Syd Conabere
- Frank Gatliff

=== Production ===
The play had been performed in theatres in Australia in the early 1950s.

It had been performed on Australian radio in 1957 with Ray Barrett and Gordon Glenwright.

It was the first presentation at the ABC's new studio at Rippon Lea, Melbourne. At that point, the ABC were using a small studio at Rippon Lea and telecasting its bigger productions from Coppin Hall. A third studio at Rippon Lea would be open in September.

== See also ==
- List of live television plays broadcast on Australian Broadcasting Corporation (1950s)
