= The Marriage of Figaro (1960 film) =

- Based on: opera The Marriage of Figaro by Mozart
- Directed by: Alan Burke
- Country of origin: Australia
- Original language: English

Production
- Running time: 120 mins

Original release
- Network: ABC
- Release: 17 February 1960 (Sydney)
- Release: 6 May 1960 (Melbourne)

The Marriage of Figaro is a 1960 Australian TV film broadcast by ABC TV. It was a filmed version of Mozart's 1786 opera, sung in English.

== Cast ==
- Valda Bagnall as Susanna
- Geoffrey Chard as Figaro
- Heather McMillan as Countess
- Russell Smith as Count
- Marie Tysoe as Cherubino
- Margaret Winkler as Marcelina
- Noel Melvin as Dr Bartolo
- Ereach Riley as Basilio
- John Probyn as Antonio

Georg Tintner conducted the Sydney Symphony Orchestra.

== Production ==
Marie Tyso had appeared in several other operas for the ABC. She was used to doing them live but this one involved pre-recorded music. "It was a much better way to do it", she said. "Of course, we now had to mime during the performance. We did the dialogue live. Alan Burke was the producer – he was wonderful to work with."

It was the sixth opera broadcast live from the ABC in Sydney and the first two-hour one done live in Australia. Settings for the four acts were devised in one unit to enable aimed at keeping the action moving continuously.

== Reception ==
The critic for The Sydney Morning Herald praised the singing and set, saying it was "a distinguished live telecast ... producer Alan Burke boldly moved his cast about through ... [the] elaborate and fanciful set with great zest and speed."

== See also ==
- List of live television plays broadcast on the Australian Broadcasting Corporation (1956–1969)
