= Killer in Close-Up =

1957 Australian television film

- Ad from The Age 14 Nov 1957
- Genre: Anthology
- Written by: George F. Kerr
- Directed by: Christopher Muir; William Sterling; Raymond Menmuir
- Country of origin: Australia
- Original language: English
- No. of seasons: 1
- No. of episodes: 4

Production
- Running time: 30 minutes
- Production company: ABC

Original release
- Network: ABC
- Release: 9 September 1957 – 13 August 1958

Killer in Close-Up is a blanket title covering four live television drama plays produced by the Australian Broadcasting Commission in 1957 and 1958. It could be seen as the first anthology series produced for Australian television.

Production of the plays was split equally between the Melbourne and Sydney ABC stations, with the first and fourth being produced in Sydney, the second and third in Melbourne. Each ran for 25 minutes. The plays were produced by Christopher Muir, Raymond Menmuir and Will Sterling.

The title came from the use of the close up in television drama.

The drama plays were based on real-life cases, dramatised for television by George F. Kerr. They were, in order:

- “The Robert Wood Trial” (4/9/57)
- “The Wallace Case” (20/11/57)
- “The Rattenbury Case” (18/6/58)
- “The Trial Of Madeleine Smith” (13/8/58)

In Melbourne, the play aired against Chesebrough-Ponds Playhouse on HSV-7 (which consisted selections from US anthology series) and Douglas Fairbanks Theatre (aka Douglas Fairbanks Jr Presents, a British-American anthology production) on GTV-9, and was broadcast at 8:30PM. In effect, viewers had a choice of three different half-hour self-contained dramas during that night.

== "The Robert Wood Trial" ==
It was broadcast "live" from Sydney on 4 September 1957, recorded and shown in Melbourne on 4 October 1957. It was directed by Raymond Menmuir.

=== Plot ===
Based on the 1907 Camden Town Murder, where Robert Wood was tried for the murder of a prostitute and was acquitted.

=== Cast ===
- Brian Anderson
- Leonard Bullen

=== Production ===
The first play used nine sets and twelve actors. The Sydney Morning Herald said its goal was "to show new techniques in Australian TV production and acting."

== "The Wallace Case" ==
The Wallace Case was directed by Christopher Muir in Melbourne. It was broadcast live in that city on 20 November 1957.

=== Plot ===
In 1931, William Herbert Wallace is accused of murdering his wife.

=== Cast ===
- Laurier Lange (aka Laurie Lange) as William Wallace
- Noel Howlett as the judge
- Brian James as the prosecutor
- Norman Griffiths as the defence counsel
- John Morgan
- Robert Stevens
- Campbell Copelin

=== Production ===
Muir used close ups extensively to build tension. George F. Kerr came down from Sydney to help with the production and acted asa narrator.

== "The Rattenbury Case" ==
This episode was recorded live in Melbourne and aired on 18 June 1958. It was directed by Will Sterling.

The episode The Rattenbury Case may be held by the National Archives of Australia (per a search of their website).

=== Plot ===
Francis Rattenbury, a famous architect, is murdered.

=== Cast ===
- Patricia Kennedy as Mrs Rattenbury
- Edward Brayshaw as Stoner
- John Morgan
- Neil Fitzpatrick
- James Haggart
- Bettine Kauffmann
- Laurie Lange
- Brian Moll
- Wyn Roberts
- Nevil Thurgood

=== Production ===
It was the first TV performance from experienced actor Patricia Kennedy.

== "The Trial of Madeleine Smith" ==
The play was broadcast "live" from Sydney on 13 August 1958. It aired Melbourne 25 October 1958.

=== Plot ===
In 1857 Glasgow, a girl is tried for the murder of her lover. From the first meeting between the lovers to the final verdict in Edinburgh Court.

=== Cast ===
- Janette Craig as Madeleine Smith
- Owen Weingott as Emile L'Angelier
- Berys Marsh
- Keith Jarvis
- Gordon Glenwright
- Keith Buckley
- Mayne Lynton
- Edward Smith
- Royston Marcus
- George F. Kerr as Narrator

=== Production ===
Janette Craig was Miss NSW in 1957.

== See also ==
- List of live television plays broadcast on Australian Broadcasting Corporation (1950s)
