= The Public Prosecutor =

- Based on: play by Fritz Hochwälder.
- Written by: William Sterling
- Directed by: William Sterling
- Country of origin: Australia
- Original language: English

Production
- Running time: 75 minutes
- Production company: ABC

Original release
- Release: 23 July 1958 (Melbourne, live)
- Release: 6 January 1960 (Sydney)

The Public Prosecutor is a 1958 television play broadcast by the Australian Broadcasting Corporation. It was set during the French Revolution and was based on a play by Fritz Hochwälder. It was shown live in Melbourne in July 1958 but did not screen in Sydney until 1960.

== Plot ==
The Public Prosecutor is responsible for rounding up victims of the guillotine. He wants the name of a man known only to Theresia. Meanwhile the French Assembly of Deputies debate the end of terror. The identity of the final victim is a surprise.

== Cast ==
- Frank Gatliff as Fouquier, the Prosecutor
- John Morgan as Tallien, Theresia's husband
- Patricia Kennedy as Theresia

== Production ==
The play had been performed by the BBC in 1957.

It was shot at ABC's new studios at Rippon Lea. It was Patricia Kennedy's second TV performance following playing Mrs Rattenbury in Killer in Close Up. The play took eight weeks to prepare and involved construction of an eight foot guillotine.

Designer John Peters had also designed sets depicting revolutionary France in the film The Elusive Pimpernel.

== Reception ==
GTV-9 engineers called up after the broadcast to congratulate ABV-2 on the technical excellence of the program.

== See also ==
- List of live television plays broadcast on Australian Broadcasting Corporation (1950s)
