= The Strong Are Lonely =

- SMH ad 18 May 1959
- Genre: historical
- Based on: play by Fritz Hochwälder
- Written by: Philip Albright
- Directed by: Raymond Menmuir
- Country of origin: Australia
- Original language: English

Production
- Running time: 75 mins
- Production company: ABC

Original release
- Network: ABC
- Release: 20 May 1959 (Sydney, live)
- Release: 1 July 1959 (Melbourne, taped)

The Strong Are Lonely is a 1959 Australian television play produced by Ray Menmuir and starring John Alden. It was one of several plays set in South America.

== Plot ==
The struggle by Spanish Jesuits to establish themselves in Paraguay. At a Jesuit mission, a state official arrives from Madrid, because Spanish slave owners are upset at Indian labourers are fleeing to the mission where they can live freely and in communities.

== Cast ==
- John Alden as Father Provincial
- Ric Hutton as the inquisitor
- Peter Carver
- Don Crosby
- Al Thomas
- Philip College
- Nat Levison

== Production ==
The 1942 play written by Fritz Hochwälder was originally performed in German as Das heilige Experiment, then translated into French then English. Donald Wolfit had starred in a 1956 British TV and radio version.

According to one report, "With 16 speaking roles and extras numbering 23, The Strong Are Lonely will have the largest cast to appear in a “live” Australian TV drama."

Five Indian students from Sydney University were among the 23 extras.

It was advertised as "the ABC's 56th live TV play, with an all-Australian cast... acclaimed in London, Paris and Rome as an outstanding contribution to contemporary drama."

== Reception ==
The Age said Alden contributed some "very fine acting" and that the play was "a cut above the TV dramas offered us in recent months."

The Bulletin said "Ray Menmuir won considerable acclaim" for the production.

The Sydney Morning Herald called it "an absorbing live-play" where "the author's skilful working of the big issues involved being _matched in vital places by acting forceful and sizable enough to ensure safepassage for his arguments." The critic felt both Alden and Hutton were "a little undecided from time to time as to whether a stage-acting or a film-acting technique was required of them. But, with television acting being such a difficult combination of both kinds of playing, they were fortunate to have the guidance of a producer like Raymond Menmuir, and the net outcome of the production, though finally a little flat and disappointing, was an entertainment of stature, substance and challenge."

== See also ==
- List of live television plays broadcast on Australian Broadcasting Corporation (1950s)
