= Beverley Dunn =

Australian actress (1933–2021)

- Born: Beverley Ruth Dunn; 24 April 1933; Melbourne, Victoria, Australia
- Died: 27 November 2021 (aged 88); Melbourne, Victoria, Australia
- Occupations: Actress (film, TV, radio and theatre), voice artist, radio reader
- Years active: 1957-2016 (Film and TV) Theatre 1952-2008

Beverley Ruth Dunn (24 April 1933 – 27 November 2021) was an Australian veteran radio, stage, television and film actress based in Melbourne, Australia.

== Biography ==
Dunn had roles in films including Ground Zero, Gross Misconduct, Shine (1996), The Craic (1999), The Dish (2000) and Charlie and Boots (2009).

She appeared in numerous television series for which she was best known including Bellbird and The Flying Doctors as Claire Byrant.

Other TV credits : Productions for both Crawford Productions and Grundy Television including Homicide, Matlock Police, Division 4, Prisoner (4 different character roles), Carson's Law, Neighbours (as Tina Bentley), A Country Practice and All Saints.

She appeared in Roundabout, the first live play produced for Melbourne television (broadcast on 4 January 1957).

Dunn featured in hundreds of radio plays and book readings for both the ABC and the BBC in England.

Her lengthy stage career dating from 1952 until 2008, included roles for state and local companies, including for the Melbourne Theatre Company, Playbox Theatre, HIT Productions, South Australian Theatre Company, St Martins Theatre, Alexander Theatre. Melbourne Little Theatre and Tin Alley Players, as well as her one woman play As We Are that several times toured nationally.

Dunn died in Melbourne, Australia on 27 November 2021, at the age of 88.

== Awards ==
| Award | Year | Production | Result |
|---|---|---|---|
| Green Room Award | 1993 | A Happy and Holly Occasion | Won |

== Filmography ==
=== Film ===
| Year | Title | Role | Type |
|---|---|---|---|
| 1957 | Roundabout | The Other Woman | TV movie |
| 1957 | Fair Passenger | | TV movie |
| 1958 | Gaslight | Bella Manningham | TV movie |
| 1958 | The Small Victory | Sister Annalissa | TV movie |
| 1958 | The Lark | Joan of Arc | TV movie |
| 1959 | Black Chiffon | | TV movie |
| 1959 | Antony and Cleopatra | Octavia | TV movie |
| 1960 | Eye of the Night | Ruth Arnott | TV movie |
| 1962 | Marriage Lines | Peggy, Felix's secretary | TV movie |
| 1964 | Everyman | Good Deeds | TV movie |
| 1964 | Luther | Katherine | TV movie |
| 1964 | A Provisional Lady | Daris Studendev | TV movie |
| 1965 | Photo Finish | The Mother | TV movie |
| 1987 | Ground Zero | Commissioner #1 | Feature film |
| 1993 | Gross Misconduct | Judge Barlow | Feature film |
| 1996 | Shine | Beryl Alcott | Feature film |
| 1996 | Brilliant Lies | President | Feature film |
| 1997 | The Last of the Ryans | Ethel | TV movie |
| 1999 | The Craic | Farmer's Wife | Feature film |
| 2000 | The Dish | Secretary | Feature film |
| 2009 | Saved | Carmel | TV movie |
| 2009 | Charlie and Boots | Val | Feature film |
| 2016 | Dogstar: Christmas in Space | Gran | TV movie |

=== Television ===
| Year | Title | Role | Type |
|---|---|---|---|
| 1970–75 | Division 4 | 5 character roles | TV series |
| 1973–75 | Matlock Police | 3 roles | TV series |
| 1965–76 | Homicide | 6 roles | TV series |
| 1976-1977 | Bellbird | Mary Campbell | TV series, 3 episodes |
| 1977 | Bluey | Janey Hobbs | TV series |
| 1978-1979 | Cop Shop | Mrs Jean Holden | TV series |
| 1981 | Cornflakes for Tea | | TV series |
| 1982 | Carson's Law | Mrs. Craig / Mrs. Forbes | TV series |
| 1995 | The Fast Lane | Rona | TV series |
| 1979-1985 | Prisoner: Cell Block H | Ethel Warner / Mrs. Michell / Irene Henderson / Cynthia Leach | TV series |
| 1987 | Neighbours | Tina Bentley | TV series |
| 1989 | The Magistrate | Doctor | TV miniseries |
| 1992 | Bligh | Flora Betlham | TV series |
| 1990-1992 | The Flying Doctors | Claire Bryant | TV series |
| 1992 | Fast Forward | Additional cast | TV series |
| 1992 | Kelly | Mrs. Williams | TV series |
| 1992 | Cluedo | Aunt Elelina | TV series |
| 1993 | A Country Practice | Sister Leonie Sterling | TV series |
| 1997 | Good Guys, Bad Guys | Norma Finster | TV series |
| 1999 | The Adventures of Lano and Woodley | | TV series |
| 1999 | Halifax f.p. | Monica Harris | TV series |
| 1999 | The Micallef Program | Lynn Claxton | TV series |
| 1999 | Tribe | Sister Margaret | TV miniseries |
| 2003 | Welcher & Welcher | Mrs. Cosgrove | TV miniseries |
| 2003 | All Saints | Sister Roslyn Barry | TV series |
| 2008 | Underbelly | Sybil Kinniburgh | TV series |
| 2007–11 | Dogstar | Gran | TV series |
| 2012 | Conspiracy 365 | Millicent Ormond | TV series |
