= Don Pasquale (1962 film) =

- Directed by: Alan Burke
- Country of origin: Australia
- Original language: English

Production
- Running time: 100 minutes

Original release
- Release: 31 January 1962

Don Pasquale is a 1962 Australian television play based on the opera Don Pasquale by Gaetano Donizetti and Giovanni Ruffini. Australian TV drama was relatively rare at the time.

== Cast ==
- Peter Baillie as Ernest (tenor)
- Alan Eddy as Don Pasquale
- John Germain as Dr. Malatesta
- Rosalind Keene as Norina

== Reception ==
The Sydney Morning Herald critic thought the "acting was not of a calibre to seem more than dutifully amusing at close quarter" and that some of the cast struggled "to suit lip, tongue and jaw movements to the sound of their own pre-recorded voices" but that "the compensations were many and decisive: coolly handsome settings and costumes... a sequence of witty and graceful drawings of orchestral musicians that solved the problem of what to do with the cameras during the overture; a general visual sophistication and dignity" as well as the "insinuating brilliance of Donizetti's music".
