= G'Day Digger! =

1958 televised Australian ballet

G'day Digger! is a 1958 televised Australian ballet. It was the first complete Australian ballet to be broadcast by the ABC. Peter Page directed. It aired on February 11, 1958, and ran for half an hour. It was a "light-hearted fantasy" about an Australian soldier and his friend on leave in Sydney. It aired in Melbourne on March 12.

== Plot ==
The ball opens in a shell-hole during the Siege of Tobruk. Two Diggers meet and dream of leave in Sydney. The scene dissolves to a bar in King's Cross. They met barmaid May and her friend Sheila plus an Elegant Inebriate and a "Bodgie".

== Cast ==
- Colin Fitzgerald as the Digger
- Beth Dean as Sheila
- Valrne Tweedie as May
- Alec Crethar as the Digger's Mate
- John Sherwood

== Production ==
The story was by Victor Carell and the choreography was by Beth Dean for composer John Antill. Dean had done the choreography with Antill for the ballet Corroboree. The ballet was commissioned by the Arts Council and toured New South Wales in April. Desmonde Dowling did the sets.

=== Music ===
Music included a comic theme for the Elegant Inebriate, a rhumba for "The Bodgie", and romantic music for May and the Digger's Mate.
