= Cavalleria Rusticana (1959 film) =

- Based on: the opera Cavalleria Rusticana by Pietro Mascagni
- Directed by: Alan Burke
- Country of origin: Australia
- Original language: English

Production
- Running time: 75 mins

Original release
- Release: 12 June 1959

Cavalleria Rusticana is a 1959 Australian television play, an adaptation of the opera by Pietro Mascagni. It was directed by Alan Burke.

Music was provided by the Sydney Symphony Orchestra conducted by Georg Tintner.

== Plot ==
In a Sicilian village, the peasant girl Santuzza falls for the tanner Turiddu. However he tires of her and returns to his old love, Lola. To get revenge, Santuzza tells Lola's husband Alfio about the love affair, resulting in a duel with knives between Alfio and Turiddu.

== Cast ==
- Heather McMillan as Santussa
- Alan Ferris as Turiddu
- Florence Taylor
- Neil Easton as Alfio
- Mary Tysoe as Lola

== Production ==
It was the fourth live opera from the ABC following, "The Telephone," "Pagliacci", and "Prima Donna." Alan Burke had directed Prima Donna.

Singer Marie Tysoe later recalled "That was also performed live. We had monitors strategically placed in the sets so that the singers could always see the conductor."

== Reception ==
The TV critic from the Sydney Morning Herald called it "no more than a partial success". He praised its "well planned and well designed sets" but thought it lacked movement and felt the singing "was often heavy and uncertain" and acting "either stagey or inhibited, and sometimes both.. It seems that the initial requirements for local televised opera is singers who can adapt their style to the searching eye of the camera.

== See also ==
- List of live television plays broadcast on Australian Broadcasting Corporation (1950s)
