= The Barber of Seville (1958 film) =

- Based on: The Barber of Seville
- Country of origin: Australia
- Original language: English

Production
- Production company: ABC

Original release
- Release: 1958

The Barber of Seville is a 1958 Australian TV play.

== See also ==
- List of live television plays broadcast on Australian Broadcasting Corporation (1950s)
