= Holiday in Biarritz =

- The Age 16 May 1957
- Based on: play by Jean Sarment
- Directed by: Eric McCleery
- Country of origin: Australia
- Original language: English

Production
- Running time: 30 mins
- Production company: ABC

Original release
- Network: ABC
- Release: 20 May 1957

Holiday in Biarritz is a 1957 Australian TV play, adapted from a French play by Jean Sarment. It aired on 20 May 1957 and ran for 30 minutes. It was directed by Eric McCleery from the ABC's studios at Rippon Lea.

It was based on a radio play that had been performed on Australia radio in 1953. It had also been performed on British TV in 1953.

== Plot ==
A French stationmaster, George Dupont, wants to spend a holiday at Biarritz.

== Cast ==
- Peter O'Shaughnessy as George Dupont
- Moira Carleton
- Neil Fitzpatrick

== Production ==
Advertisements said "pardon our pride but Channel Two is still the only TV station bringing you live drama – produced in Melbourne – with Australian artists." Moira Carleton had been in the Melbourne TV production of Roundabout (1957), the first live drama from that city.

== See also ==
- List of live television plays broadcast on Australian Broadcasting Corporation (1950s)
