= Gas Light =

1938 British thriller play by Patrick Hamilton

Gas Light A Victorian Thriller in Three Acts
- First edition 1939
- Original language: English
- Written by: Patrick Hamilton
- Characters: Mr Manningham; Mr Rough; Mrs Manningham; Elizabeth; Nancy
- Genre: Thriller
- Setting: On Angel Street, in the Pimlico district of London, 1880

Premiere
- Date: 5 December 1938
- Place: Richmond Theatre, Richmond, London

Gas Light is a 1938 thriller play, set in 1880s London, written by the British novelist and playwright Patrick Hamilton. Hamilton's play is a dark tale of a marriage based on deceit and trickery, and a husband committed to driving his wife insane in order to steal from her.

Gas Light was written during a dark period in Hamilton's life. Six years prior to the play Hamilton was hit by a drunk driver and dragged through the streets of London, leaving him with a limp, a paralysed arm, and a disfigured face. Two years later, Hamilton's mother took her own life.

Premiering at the Richmond Theatre in London on 5 December 1938 before transferring to the Apollo Theatre in the West End on 31 January 1939, the play closed after six months and 141 performances, but it has endured through an impressive list of incarnations most notably Five Chelsea Lane (1941 American play – renamed for Los Angeles production), Angel Street (1941 American play – renamed again when Los Angeles production transferred to Broadway), and Gaslight (1958 Australian television play). Angel Street was a hit in its Broadway premiere, and it remains one of the longest-running non-musicals in Broadway history, with 1,295 total performances.

The play was adapted to the big screen as two films, both entitled Gaslight—a 1940 British film, and a 1944 American film directed by George Cukor, also known as The Murder in Thornton Square in the UK. Both films are considered classics in their respective countries of origin, and are generally equally critically acclaimed. The 1944 American version received seven nominations at the 17th Academy Awards, including Best Picture, and won two, Best Actress (for Ingrid Bergman) and Best Production Design. In 2019, the film was selected for preservation in the United States National Film Registry by the Library of Congress as being "culturally, historically, or aesthetically significant".

== Synopsis ==
The play is set in fog-bound London in 1880, at the upper middle class home of Jack Manningham and his wife Bella. It is late afternoon, a time that Hamilton notes as the time "before the feeble dawn of gaslight and tea."

Bella is clearly on edge, and the stern reproaches of her overbearing husband (who flirts with the servants in front of his wife) make matters worse. What most perturbs Bella is Jack's unexplained disappearances from the house: he will not tell her where he is going, and this increases her anxiety. It becomes clear that Jack is intent on convincing Bella that she is going insane, even to the point of assuring her she is imagining things.

The appearance of a police detective called Rough leads Bella to realise that Jack is responsible for her torment. Rough explains that the apartment above was once occupied by one Alice Barlow, a wealthy woman who was murdered for her jewels. The murderer was never found.

Jack goes to the flat each night to search for the jewels, and lighting the apartment's gas lights causes the lights to dim in the rest of the building. His footsteps in the supposedly empty apartment persuade Bella that she is "hearing things". Rough convinces Bella to assist him in exposing Jack as the murderer, which she does, but not before she takes revenge on Jack by pretending to help him escape. At the last minute she reminds him that, having gone insane, she is not accountable for her actions. The play closes with Jack being led away by the police.

== Productions ==
=== London ===
Gas Light premiered on 5 December 1938 at the Richmond Theatre in Richmond, London. It transferred to the Apollo Theatre on 31 January 1939 and to the Savoy Theatre on 22 May 1939. The cast featured Dennis Arundell (Mr. Manningham), Milton Rosmer (Mr. Rough), Gwen Ffrangcon-Davies (Mrs. Manningham), Beatrice Rowe (Elizabeth) and Elizabeth Inglis (Nancy). The production closed 10 June 1939 after a total of 141 performances.

=== Broadway ===
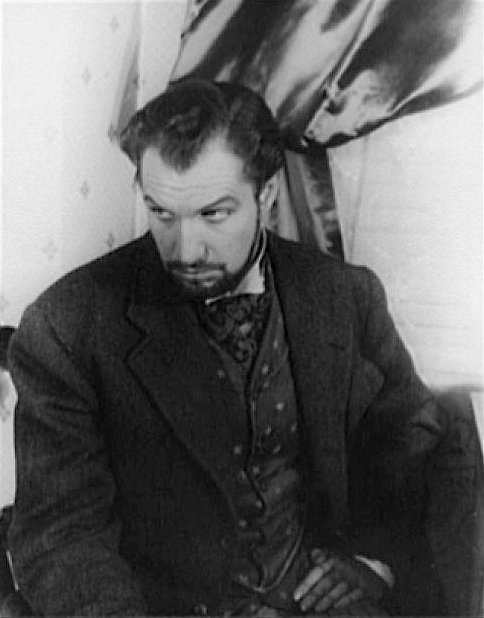
Vincent Price in the Broadway production of Angel Street

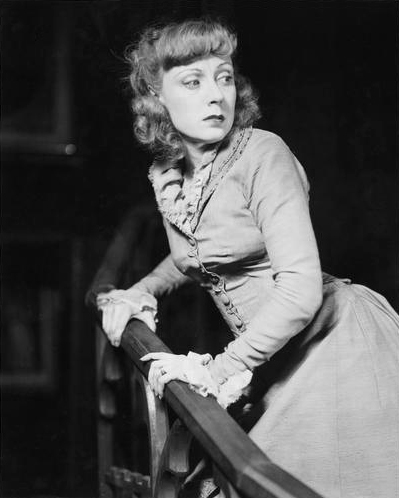
Judith Evelyn in the Broadway production of Angel Street

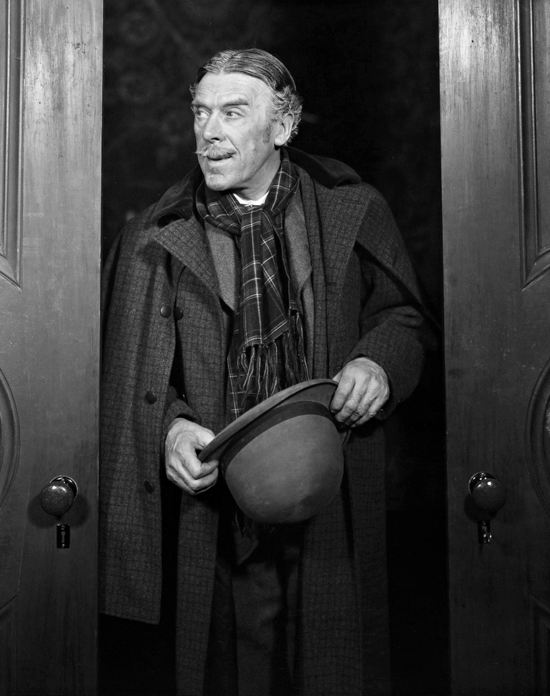
Leo G. Carroll in the Broadway production of Angel Street

In the spring of 1941 Vincent Price and his wife, actress Edith Barrett, saw Gas Light performed in Los Angeles as a three-hander titled Five Chelsea Lane. They were impressed by the play and set about securing the rights for a Broadway production of their own. By fall, they had found a producer to underwrite the project, but Barrett abruptly withdrew to remain in Hollywood and work in films. In November 1941 Price returned to work on the New York stage. Judith Evelyn, the Canadian actress who played the role of Mrs. Manningham in Los Angeles, joined the Broadway production. The name of the play changed to Angel Street.

Angel Street premiered on Broadway at the John Golden Theatre on 5 December 1941, produced and directed by Shepard Traube (1907–1983). The cast featured Leo G. Carroll (Rough), Florence Edney (Elizabeth), Elizabeth Eustis (Nancy), Judith Evelyn (Mrs. Manningham) and Vincent Price (Mr. Manningham). Price left the play after a year, when his working relationship with Evelyn deteriorated into what she later described as "violent dislike". In December 1942 John Emery assumed the role of Mr. Manningham.

In a long profile headlined "The Triumph of Traube," published on 14 March 1943, The New York Times described some of the challenges faced by the production, including the untimely opening date, two days before Pearl Harbor: "On Dec. 5 the play opened, on Dec. 6 the rave reviews had sent a long line of pilgrims to the theatre box office, on Dec. 7 the play was forgotten under the impact of the Japanese attack. Angel Street wabbled momentarily then picked up its stride, which has hardly slackened since." The play transferred to the Bijou Theatre on 2 October 1944 and closed on 30 December 1944 after 1,295 performances.

=== On tour ===
On 19 December 1941 The New York Times announced that Traube had cancelled a trip to the West Coast in order to form a touring company for Angel Street. The tour was to begin in Baltimore in February, with stops including Washington, D.C.; Pittsburgh, Pennsylvania; and Chicago, Illinois.

On Sunday, 15 March 1942, the touring company of Angel Street opened in Chicago to rave reviews. The New York Times reported an observation by Chicago critic Robert Pollak that "Not since Hellzapoppin had the crowd out front participated so heartily".

=== Revivals ===
Angel Street was added to the repertory of The American Negro Players in 1947.

Gas Light ran at New York City Center from 22 January 1948 to 1 February 1948 for 14 performances. Directed by Richard Barr, the cast featured José Ferrer (Mr. Manningham), Uta Hagen (Mrs. Manningham), Phyllis Hill (Nancy), Nan McFarland (Elizabeth), Ralph Roberts (Policeman), Victor Thorley (Policeman) and Richard Whorf (Rough).

On 19 August 1952 The New York Times announced that a new off-Broadway group, Hamilton-Bruder Productions (a partnership of Patrick Hamilton and Janet Bruders), was opening with a revival of Angel Street.

Angel Street was revived on Broadway at the Lyceum Theatre, opening on 26 December 1975 and closing on 8 February 1976 after 52 performances and 4 previews. Also directed by Shepard Traube, the cast featured Michael Allinson (Mr. Manningham), Dina Merrill (Mrs. Manningham), Christine Andreas (Nancy), Bette Henritze (Elizabeth) and Robert E. Thompson (Rough).

Dulaang UP produced Angel Street's Philippine premiere in February 2005 with an English version and a Filipino translation.

The play was produced at The Old Vic, London in June 2007 under the title of Gaslight. Directed by Peter Gill, the cast featured Andrew Woodall as Mr. Manningham, Rosamund Pike as Mrs. Manningham and Kenneth Cranham as Rough.

The Irish Repertory Theatre produced the play Off-Broadway (as Gaslight) running from 17 May 2007 to 8 July 2007. The production was directed by Charlotte Moore and the cast featured David Staller (Mr. Manningham), Laura Odeh (Mrs. Manningham), Laoisa Sexton (Nancy), Patricia O'Connell (Elizabeth), April Ann Klein (Police Officer) and Brian Murray (Rough). Murray was nominated for a Lucille Lortel Award as Outstanding Featured Actor. Staller was nominated for the Drama League's Distinguished Performance Award, and the production was nominated for the League's Distinguished Revival of a Play.

In 2014 the Sandyford Little Theatre Company produced Gaslight: a Radio Play for Stage, an onstage radio play with seven actors playing 24 roles.

In 2015 Myriad Theatre & Film produced Gaslight at Ingatestone Hall in Essex.

In October 2016 the Lantern Theatre in Sheffield, England produced Gaslight.

In 2019 Perth Theatre staged a production of Gaslight as part of their Winter/Spring season.

In 2022 the Shaw Festival, the second-largest repertory theatre company in North America, staged a production of Gaslight.

On 9 September 2022 the version by Jô Soares, one of the greatest Brazilian theater directors, premiered in São Paulo, Brazil. The director did not attend the premiere, as he died on 5 August 2022. Starring Giovani Tozi and Erica Montanheiro, Gaslight - A Toxic Relationship, features a 14-metre spider web on the set, and with doses of humor, the production is still running, as one of the greatest theatrical successes in the country.

== Reception ==
Angel Street was a hit in its Broadway premiere, and it remains one of the longest-running non-musicals in Broadway history, with 1,295 total performances.

It remains a perennial favourite with both repertory and amateur theatre companies.

The New York Times critic Brooks Atkinson opens his 6 December 1941 review with this observation: “Although Patrick Hamilton writes his thrillers within a small compass, he writes them with infinite craft and dexterity. Angel Street, which sent a chill up the spine of the Golden Theatre last evening, comes off the top part of the theatre's top shelf.” Atkinson praises Straube for matching “Hamilton’s skill in a tingling performance that fills the theater with an ominous and terrifying illusion” and commends all the actors, observing that Leo G. Carroll had his best role in years.

In his review of the 1948 City Center production, Louis Kronenberger wrote: "(It) remains one of the better thrillers ... let's call it one of the best. All the same, though it holds up nicely for three acts, it seems to me outstandingly good for only one."

Reviewing Traube's 1975 Broadway revival, Clive Barnes asked: “Whatever happened to the good, old‐fashioned melodrama? It probably drifted over to television and died. Just about 35 years ago...Patrick Hamilton's English thriller, Angel Street, opened on Broadway with resounding success. It was directed and produced by Shepard Traube. Last night, at the Lyceum Theater, Mr. Traube attempted an encore. It was not called for... The trouble with this play is not the trouble with this particular play—it is the trouble with this play as a particular. The theater cannot afford the luxury anymore of wilting heroines, villains making out as if they were Vincent Price (35 years ago it was Vincent Price!) or detectives detecting with the solidity of a basset hound... Nothing is quite clever enough in Angel Street, and the atmosphere is so rarefied that the play is artistically in dire need of oxygen.”

On 24 May 2007, in her review of the Irish Repertory Theatre revival, The New York Times' Ginia Bellafante observed that Gaslight "established the blueprint for a kind of domestic-peril thriller... Every time an actress portrays the sort of wife who discovers that the greatest threat to her mental and physical safety is the man sitting in her breakfast nook, Mr. Hamilton’s estate ought to receive some type of remuneration....David Staller plays this undesirable husband as a man whose lust exempts nothing. Every time he appears onstage, you think: keep this person away from my babysitter and Rolex. Mr. Staller's rogue posture modulates his character's cruelty, leavening the play's potentially stifling mood. Mr. Hamilton believed our most dangerous enemies were always in the room with us ..., and his work can feel claustrophobic. Ms. Moore is aware of this, providing the proper ventilation to clear much of the Victorian must. Brian Murray, playing the detective who uncovers Manningham's plan, is her greatest asset in this regard. He appears onstage with the red cheeks of a Santa Claus, an ageing imp who hides out in nooks and corners, showing a benevolent sarcasm that teases Bella out of her dimwitted complacency".

== Adaptations ==
=== Film ===
- The 1940 British film Gaslight, directed by Thorold Dickinson.
- The 1944 American film of the same name, directed by George Cukor. It was released in Britain as The Murder in Thornton Square in order to avoid confusion with the earlier film.

=== Television ===
- The cast of the original London production recreated their stage roles for a 1939 television presentation directed by Lanham Titchener and performed live on BBC Television. This was followed by three more specially-mounted BBC plays in 1947, 1948 and 1957; the latter of which starred Peter Cushing. All four versions' titles alternated between Gas Light and Gaslight.
- On 20 January 1946, NBC broadcast the complete play. The following Sunday, a long piece by New York Times critic Jack Gould examined the production and its implications for the future of television.
- The Australian Broadcasting Corporation broadcast a version in 1958.
- On 20 September 1960, ITV broadcast Gaslight as Play of the Week, starring Louis Jourdan and Margaret Leighton.
- Polish television aired a live stage play on 28 September 1961, under the Polish title Gasnący płomień. This was a part of its ongoing series of televised stage plays under the name Cobra Theater (Kobra – Teatr Sensacji). It is the oldest episode of the Cobra Theatre series that is known to have survived in its entirety on tape.
- There were at least five other versions made for television from Germany in 1956, 1960 and 1977; Denmark in 1957; and Italy in 1966.

=== Radio ===
- There been 10 adaptations of the play broadcast on BBC Radio, beginning in 1939 with the cast of the original London production, and most recently in 2023 with music by Imelda May. As with ethe BBC Television versions, their titles alternate between Gas Light and Gaslight.
- The story was dramatised as a half-hour radio play on the 3 February 1947 broadcast of The Screen Guild Theater, starring Charles Boyer and Susan Hayward.
- A 1946 one-hour radio production on Lux Radio Theatre featured Charles Boyer and Ingrid Bergman, stars of the 1944 film adaptation.
- A 2019 podcast adaptation starred Chloë Grace Moretz, though it was set in the modern day, and the plot was significantly modernised. It was sponsored by Talkspace.

=== Stage ===
- In 2022, Canada's Shaw Festival premiered a feminist adaptation of the play penned by Johnna Wright and Patty Jamieson. The production, directed by Kelli Fox, starred Julie Lumsden as Bella and André Morin as Jack.
- Steven Dietz has also done an adaptation of the novel.
