= The Shadow of Doubt =

The Shadow of Doubt is a 1955 stage play written by Norman King. It had its world premiere at the King's Theatre, Glasgow in 1955.

== Plot ==
A nuclear physicist seeks to return to his lab after serving five years in prison for breaching the Official Secrets Act. Disgraced and friendless, he can only get work as a clerk. He is followed by MI5.

== 1957 Australian television version ==
The Shadow of Doubt
- Based on: play by Norman King
- Directed by: Raymond Menmuir
- Country of origin: Australia
- Original language: English

Production
- Production company: ABC

Original release
- Network: ABC
- Release: 5 June 1957 (Live) (Sydney)
- Release: July 1957 (Melbourne) (taped)

A version for television aired on Australian broadcaster ABC. It was the second hour-long "live" drama ever broadcast on the ABC.

Originally shown live in Sydney on 5 June 1957, it was kinescoped, and shown in Melbourne on 5 July 1957.

=== Cast ===
- Bruce Beeby as Manning, an MI5 official
- Don Crosby as the scientist, Dr Arthur Ross
- Winifred Green
- Betty Lucas
- Reg Lye

=== Production ===
The show was rehearsed for 44 hours. ABC's head of drama Neil Hutchinson told the press:

TV actors have to forget all the traditions of the stage. Theatre audiences accept without question the convention that allows an actor to say 'I love you,' projecting his voice so that it is heard in the back row of the gods. Televiewers in their own living rooms won't accept this convention at all. They don't want to hear his emotions shouted at them; they want to see and hear at normal pitch. They also have to learn to cut down on gestures, to get their meaning across in the space encompassed by the eye of the camera.

Desmonde Downing, one of the leading theatre designers at the time, did the sets. It was the TV debut of Don Crosby.

== See also ==
- Miss Mabel
- List of live television plays broadcast on Australian Broadcasting Corporation (1950s)
