= The House of Mancello =

1962 Australian film

- Ad from The Age 18 April 1962
- Written by: Chris Gardner
- Directed by: William Sterling
- Country of origin: Australia
- Original language: English

Production
- Running time: 75 mins

Original release
- Release: 18 April 1962 (Melbourne)
- Release: 2 May 1962

The House of Mancello is a 1962 Australian TV drama shot in Melbourne about a new Australian family.

It was one of a series of six Australian plays produced by the ABC in 1962. The others were:

- Boy Round the Corner
- Funnel Web
- The Teeth of the Wind
- The Hobby Horse
- Jenny

== Plot ==
An Italian immigrant family, the Mancellos, have a dress manufacturing business which is in trouble. They import Joe, a dress designer relative from Italy to make changes (to turn the place into a fashion shop) which Mamma Mancello resents. Daughter Lucia is more receptive but not keen on Joe's ideas. She wants to sell the business to help her Australian boyfriend.

== Cast ==
- Moira Carleton as Mama Mancello
- Elizabeth Goodman as Lucia Mancello
- Mark Kelly as Joe
- Campbell Copelin
- Roly Barlee
- Joan Harris
- Diana Bell
- Carol Potter
- Margaret Browne
- Brenda Beddison
- Pat McLean

== Production ==
Chris Gardner was a housewife who began writing ten years before this aired. Her play The Pub at Pelican Creek was performed in 1961. She wrote short stories, radio plays and the TV play Dark Under a Sun.

It was shot in Melbourne.

== Reception ==
The Sydney Morning Herald said that the play "was yet another classic demonstration of the ruinous effects of poor television techniques on even the best of plays" in particular, maintaining "a camera angle of roughly 50 to 60 degrees for the duration of the 45-minute production, and for all shots including groups and close-ups, a fault most box camera enthusiasts would be ashamed of. And lighting, such an important factor, was equally rudimentary." The critic did think "to a really dedicated viewer the play itself revealed many timely, interesting aspects of a migrant family's assimilation problems in Australia. But the dialogue is not brilliant, and such climaxes as there are attain little real force."

The Age called it "a potboiler which had too few moments" where the "broken English... became a little tiresome" and the "plot was so thin."

== Radio ==
The play was adapted for radio in 1963.

== See also ==
- List of television plays broadcast on Australian Broadcasting Corporation (1960s)
