= Dark Brown (1957 film) =

- Written by: Philip Johnston
- Directed by: Christopher Muir
- Starring: Agnes Dobson; Laura James
- Country of origin: Australia
- Original language: English

Production
- Running time: 30 mins or 45 mins
- Production company: ABC

Original release
- Release: 24 June 1957 (live, Melbourne)
- Release: 23 August 1957 (taped, Sydney)

Dark Brown is an early Australian television film, broadcast during 1957 on ABC.

It was broadcast live in Melbourne, one of the first TV productions from that city.

The play was later filmed again by the ABC in Brisbane in 1963.

== Plot ==
In London in 1900, a young woman fears that her husband is going to murder her. She is encouraged in this belief by her mother. But all is not as it appears to be.

One listing called it "a psychological drama with a suspense twist".

== Cast ==
- Walter Brown
- Agnes Dobson
- Laura James
- Roma Johnston
- Max Meldrum
- Margaret Cruikshank
- Lorna Forbes

== Production ==
It was kinescoped (and was repeated several months after the original telecast), and was shown in Sydney (these were the only two cities in Australia with television at the time). Its cast included Walter Brown, Agnes Dobson and British actress Laura James.

Original telecast was on 24 June 1957, repeat telecast via kinescope recording on 30 September 1957.

== Repeat ==
The show was repeated in Melbourne on 30 September 1957.

== See also ==
- List of live television plays broadcast on Australian Broadcasting Corporation (1950s)
