= Elizabeth Refuses =

1957 Australian television play

- Based on: Pride and Prejudice by Jane Austen
- Written by: Margaret Macnamara
- Directed by: William Sterling
- Country of origin: Australia
- Original language: English

Production
- Running time: 30 mins
- Production company: ABC

Original release
- Network: ABC
- Release: 5 February 1957 (Sydney)

Elizabeth Refuses is a 1957 Australian TV play based on the 1813 novel Pride and Prejudice by Jane Austen. It was directed by William Sterling. It was performed live from Sydney on 5 February 1957.

The adaptation was written by English writer Margaret Macnamara of a number of scenes from Jane Austen's novel. It ran for 30 minutes on the ABC.

== Plot ==
In the Bennet house, Mrs Bennet wishes for her two sisters, Elizabeth and Jane, to be married. Mr Collins, a clergyman, arrives seeking a bride. Lady Catherine de Bourgh hints at future happiness for Elizabeth. Elizabeth rejects Mr Collins' proposal.

== Cast ==
- Joan Lord as Elizabeth
- Norman Cull as Mr Collins
- Catherine Neill as Lady de Bourgh
- Betty Lucas as Jane
- Ailsa Grahame as Mrs. Bennet

== Production ==
Thelma Afford did the costumes.
