= Last Call (1958 film) =

1958 Australian TV film

- Advertisement from 17 Oct 1958
- Written by: Donald Fraser
- Directed by: Christopher Muir
- Country of origin: Australia
- Original language: English

Production
- Running time: 60 mins
- Production company: ABC

Original release
- Network: ABC
- Release: 19 October 1958 (Melbourne, live)
- Release: 4 January 1959 (Sydney)

Last Call is a 1958 Australian TV play set in a South American country. It was directed by Christopher Muir.

== Plot ==
General Zaguerro is the President of a fictitious South African republic. He has to decide whether to lead his army against the enemy or stay at his headquarters and defend his niece's honour.

== Cast ==
- John Morgan
- Richard Pratt
- Wynn Roberts
- Judith Thompson

== Production ==
It was broadcast in a series of "live" dramas that were shown every fortnight on Sunday night on ABV-2 Melbourne. In order, they were The Governess, The Last Call, The Rose without a Thorn, The Lark, Citizen of Westminster, and Enemy of the People (the last of "the season").

Some outdoor scenes were shot at Moorabbin Airport.

Judith Thompson later appeared in another South American set drama, You Can't Win 'Em All.

== See also ==
- List of live television plays broadcast on Australian Broadcasting Corporation (1950s)
