= The Twelve-Pound Look (1956 film) =

1956 Australian television film

- Genre: Comedy
- Based on: Play by J.M. Barrie
- Directed by: Paul O'Loughlin
- Starring: Margo Lee; Alexander Archdale; Joan Simms
- Country of origin: Australia
- Original language: English

Production
- Running time: 30 mins
- Production company: ABC

Original release
- Network: ABC
- Release: 5 November 1956

The Twelve Pound Look is an Australian 1956 live television play, based on a version by British playwright J.M. Barrie, it was significant because it was the first drama production to be televised in that country, it was broadcast by the Australian Broadcasting Commission (ABC) in black and white on their New South Wales station in Sydney ABN-2 on the opening night and the following year in Melbourne.

Being that the production was based on a play by British playwright J.M. Barrie, in the early days of Australian television it was common for dramas to be versions of overseas stories.

Kinescope recording existed at the time, and a copy of the play was made - it survives, albeit without sound.

== Premise ==
Harry Sims is a wealthy businessman who is about to be knighted. He is married to Lady Sims. On the eve of the ceremony Harry engages a typist, Kate, to answer letters of congratulation. Lady Sims and Kate have a conversation, then Kate meets Harry.

It is revealed that Harry and Kate used to be married, until she abandoned him for another man. Harry demands to know why and who the man was. Kate explains that there was no other man, she needed to leave him for her own self respect.

She leaves, with Lady Sims none the wiser to her true identity.

== Cast of 1956 production ==
- Margo Lee as Kate
- Alexander Archdale as Sir Harry Sims
- Joan Lord as Lady Sims

== Production and reception ==
The play had been performed several times and broadcast on ABC radio in Australia. The television adaptation was broadcast live from the Arcon Studios in Sydney, New South Wales (this was before the ABC's better known studios at Gore Hill were open).

Thelma Afford did the designs. "All colour is reduced to a scale of nine grey tones," said Afford.

The play was rehearsed at a studio in Forbes St.

"We were probably all a bit nervous, but everything went very smoothly," recalls script assistant Ruth Page.

Joan Lord was later in Elizabeth Refuses and The Wraith.

The budget was £335.

The Australian Women's Weekly called the 1956 version "hard to fault. Acting, direction, camera work, make-up and lighting were all excellent."

Filmink reviewing a silent copy wrote "It felt to be a very accomplished, smooth production. The leads can all act, the sets and costumes are impressive, and the camera work is absolutely fine (there were only two cameras but the cuts all make sense). Most of all, Margot Lee is terrific, full of life and spunk, even without sound, and O’Loughlin was smart enough to keep the camera on her most of the time. It is filmed theatre, but skilled filmed theatre – and because the production was so rehearsed there were no technical SNAFUs."

== Melbourne 1957 production ==
The Twelve-Pound Look
- Genre: Drama/comedy
- Based on: Play by J.M. Barrie
- Directed by: Paul O.Loughlin
- Country of origin: Australia
- Original language: English

Production
- Running time: approx. 30 minutes
- Production company: ABC

Original release
- Network: ABC
- Release: 1 April 1957

A different adaptation of the play aired at the ABC in Melbourne on ABV-2 on 1 April 1957. It cost more than the Sydney production, the final budget being a reported £684. The Running time was approx. 30 minutes.

Archival status of this version is unknown.

=== Cast ===
- Henry Cuthbertson
- Elizabeth Wing
- Mary Ward
- Alfred Bristowe

Henry Cuthbertson was a drama producer for the ABC in Victoria. Actress Mary Ward had recently returned from overseas.

== See also ==
- List of live television plays broadcast on Australian Broadcasting Corporation (1950s)
