= Menotti =

Menotti may refer to the following people:

== As a given name ==
- Menotti Aristone (c. 1942–2013), American jockey
- Menotti de Tomazzo Sobrinho (1943–2022), Brazilian football player
- Menotti Del Picchia (1892–1988), Brazilian poet, journalist and painter
- Menotti Garibaldi (1840–1903), Italian soldier and politician, son of Giuseppe Garibaldi
- Menotti Jakobsson (1892–1970), Swedish skier
- Menotti Pozzacchio (1906–1974), Luxembourgish weightlifter
- Giacinto Menotti Serrati (1872–1926), Italian communist politician and newspaper editor
- Umberto Menotti Maria Giordano (1867–1948), Italian composer

== As a surname ==
- Gian Carlo Menotti (1911–2007), Italian-American composer and librettist
- Ciro Menotti (1798–1831), Italian patriot
  - Italian submarine Ciro Menotti
- César Luis Menotti (1938–2024), Argentine footballer and manager
- Francis Menotti (born 1938), American actor and figure skater
- Giacinto Menotti Serrati (1874–1926), Italian communist politician
- Tatiana Menotti (1909–2001), Italian operatic soprano

== As a mononym ==
- Menotti, pen-name of Roberto Marchionni (born 1965), comic-book artist and screenwriter
