= The Lark (1958 film) =

- Ad from 'The Age' 14 Nov 1958
- Written by: Alan Seymour
- Directed by: William Sterling
- Music by: Robert Hughes
- Country of origin: Australia
- Original language: English

Production
- Running time: 90 mins
- Production company: ABC

Original release
- Release: 16 November 1958 (Melbourne)
- Release: 18 January 1959 (Sydney)

The Lark is a 1958 Australian TV version of the 1952 Jean Anouilh play of the same title.

According to The Age it opened "a new era in TV drama production in Melbourne."

== Plot ==
At the trial of Joan of Arc, events are shown in flashback as to how she came to rebel against the English.

== Cast ==
- Beverley Dunn as Joan of Arc
- Frank Gatliff as Cauchon
- Christopher Hill as Warwick
- Robert Peach as the Inquisitor
- Jeffrey Hodgson as the Dauphin
- John Morgan as the Promoter
- Moira Carleton as Joan's mother
- Mary Ward as Queen Yolande, the Dauphin's mother-in-law
- Laura Jane Casson as Agnès Sorel, the Dauphin's mistress
- Carole Potter as the little Queen, wife of the Dauphin
- Keith Hudson as Ladvenu
- Ilka Brand as the Dauphin's page
- Brin Newton-John as the Archbishop of Rheims
- John Royle as narrator
- Henry Cuthbertson as voice of Archangel

== Production ==
The production was based on a play which debuted in 1955 in a production starring Leo McKern and Dorothy Tutin.

Director William Sterling said he worked on the production "for some months" and promised some "controversial surprises" in the play.

It was shot in Melbourne using a cast of 24 and seven sets which occupied the entire 60 ft by 80 ft of Melbourne's Studio 32, one of the largest studios in Melbourne. Historical research to ensure authenticity of sets and costumes was carried out by designer Jon Peters.

It starred Beverly Dunn as Joan. Dunn had played the role in Melbourne Little Theatre in 1956. She did 55 hours of rehearsals. Dunn would play the role again on radio for the BBC in 1961.

It was broadcast in a series of "live" dramas on Sunday night on ABV-2 Melbourne. In order, they were The Governess, The Last Call, The Rose without a Thorn, The Lark, Citizen of Westminster, and Enemy of the People (the last of "the season").

== Reception ==
The Melbourne broadcast was recorded and shown at a meeting of the Australian Television Society, which Sterling attended. The members praised Beverly Dunn's acting but some thought the final burning scene could be more realistic. Sterling said some of the lighting effects were entirely new to Australian TV and said he was happy with the production "except for minor faults which few other viewers would notice anyway."
