= The Governess (1958 film) =

- Ad from The Age, 3 Oct 1958
- Based on: Play by Patrick Hamilton
- Directed by: William Sterling
- Starring: Patricia Kennedy
- Country of origin: Australia
- Original language: English

Production
- Running time: 60 mins
- Production company: ABC

Original release
- Network: ABC
- Release: 5 October 1958 (Melbourne)
- Release: 21 December 1958

The Governess is a 1958 television play broadcast by the Australian Broadcasting Corporation based on a play by Patrick Hamilton, which had been performed several times on Australian radio. It was directed by William Sterling who had previously directed an adaptation of Hamilton's Gaslight (1958).

It was one of several Patrick Hamilton adaptations done on Australian television.

== Plot ==
The Victorian governess of a family comes under suspicion when the baby son disappears.

== Cast ==
- Patricia Kennedy as the governess
- Carole Potter as Ellen Drew, the daughter of the house
- Brian James
- John Morgan
- Mary Disney
- Sydney Conabere
- Lesley Pope
- Muriel Hearne
- Nevil Thurgood
- Charmain Jacka

== Production ==
It was the first in a series of "live" dramas to be broadcast every fortnight on Sunday night on ABV-2. (Either broadcast live in Melbourne or telerecordings of plays originally broadcast live in Sydney.) This was in response to criticism of viewers of "old American and British films". Mr Ewart Chapple, Victorian manager of the ABC, said when announcing the policy that ""We have complete faith in local artists and in their ability to provide entertainment of world standard."

It was followed by The Last Call, The Rose without a Thorn, The Lark, Citizen of Westminster, and Enemy of the People (the last of "the season").

The advertisement for the show made nationalistic appeals saying "do you really want to encourage talented local young artists" and "we're doing our part - you can tell by tuning in."

The play was the TV debut of Carole Potter, a 15-year-old school girl. She later married the director, William Sterling.

== See also ==
- List of live television plays broadcast on Australian Broadcasting Corporation (1950s)
