= Boy Round the Corner =

- Advertisement in the Age 21 Mar 1962
- Genre: crime
- Written by: Greg Bunbury
- Directed by: Christopher Muir
- Country of origin: Australia
- Original language: English

Production
- Running time: 60 mins
- Production company: ABC

Original release
- Network: ABC
- Release: 21 March 1962 (Melbourne)
- Release: 4 April 1962 (Sydney)
- Release: 21 August 1962 (Brisbane)

Boy Round the Corner is an Australian film which aired in 1962. Broadcast live on ABC, it was set in Sydney but produced in Melbourne. Australian TV drama was relatively rare at the time.

The archival status of the film is not known, given the wiping of the era.

== Plot ==
Gerry Lacey, the son of a shoemaker, attempts to rob a taxi. The taxi crashes, killing the driver and injuring Gerry. He then appears in the living room of a cafe owner he is friendly with, Nev Hallors. Nev owns a cafe in Erskineville and regards Gerry and his sister Sue like his own children. Shannon is the brother of the driver who was killed. Carrie is Gerry's society girlfriend.

== Cast ==
- Paul Karo as Gerry Lacey
- Annette Andre as Carrie
- Keith Eden as Nev Hallors
- Norman Kaye as Shannon
- Fay Kelton as Sue
- Fred Parslow
- Roma Johnston

== Production ==
It was based on a script by short story writer Greg Bunbury. It was the first of six TV plays by Australian writers which the ABC made in 1962.

The show was shot in Melbourne, although set in Sydney's industrial west. Chris Muir researched it by visiting cafes in Melbourne's industrial suburbs. Annette Andre had previously worked with Muir in Martine. It was her last acting role on Australian television before going to England.

== Reception ==
Sydney Morning Herald gave the production a mixed review, saying:

If it did little else...[the play] showed that some, extraordinarily strong things can happen, in an Erskineville cafe. To; Mr Bunbury's credit, Erskineville and its inhabitants are not distorted; but the play is so feebly balanced and so afflicted by dramatic inertia that it often seemed the locality was a prime reason for the writing of the play. Stock characters include the proprietor, a kind of fatherly confessor; a sweet and trusting 16-year-old girl; a society girl with alt attitude; her rather vacuous boy friend; 3 reminiscing middle-aged man —they are all there. The drama in the story hinges on the 16-year-old girl's brother who appears in the cafe owner's living-room badly hurt after being in a taxi which has crashed, killing tin driver. The outstanding value of the play lies in its close and warm observation of brother-sister dependence; and fortunately the actors concerned were well able to suggest the beautiful locking of affection between the two. Fay Kelton was an amiable natural girl; Paul Karo an extremely worried young man, wincing with pain from a shattered shoulder and communicating some of 'that pain to the viewer. Christopher Muir's production was careful, and Cass van Puffelen's sets could hardly have been bettered—although the deliberate tilting of three wall objects in the proprietor's living-room was a fastidious and unwelcome touch.
