= Sirens (1994 film) =

1994 Australian-British film

- Theatrical release poster
- Directed by: John Duigan
- Written by: John Duigan
- Produced by: Sue Milliken
- Starring: Hugh Grant; Tara Fitzgerald; Sam Neill; Elle Macpherson; Portia de Rossi; Kate Fischer
- Cinematography: Geoff Burton
- Edited by: Humphrey Dixon
- Music by: Rachel Portman
- Distributed by: Roadshow Film Distributors (Australia); Buena Vista International (United Kingdom)
- Release date: 28 April 1994 (Australia)
- Running time: 95 minutes
- Countries: Australia; United Kingdom
- Language: English
- Box office: A$2.8 million - Australia; £2.6 million - United Kingdom; US$7.8 million - US and Canada

Sirens is a 1994 film, based on the life of artist and author Norman Lindsay, written and directed by John Duigan and set in Australia during the interwar period. Sirens was mostly filmed at the Norman Lindsay Gallery and Museum, Lindsay's home and studio in Faulconbridge, New South Wales and the town of Sofala near Bathurst.

Sirens, Four Weddings and a Funeral and Bitter Moon—all released in the US within weeks of one another—were the films that brought Hugh Grant to the attention of American audiences.

== Plot ==
Tony, an Anglican priest newly arrived in Australia from the United Kingdom, is asked to visit the notorious artist Norman Lindsay, out of the church's concern about a blasphemous painting of the crucifix that the artist plans to exhibit.

Estella, the priest's wife, accompanies him on the visit to the artist's bucolic compound in the Blue Mountains, New South Wales. There, they meet Lindsay's wife, Rose, two models, Pru and Sheela, and the maid, Giddy, all of whom pose for Lindsay. Devlin, the half-blind and mute "odd-job" man, also poses for Lindsay.

Initially, Tony and Estella are both disturbed by the frank conversations about human sexuality in which the members of the bohemian group all participate. They are further startled by the amount of nudity they encounter, both in the studio and outside. As the story unfolds, both Tony and Estella find themselves observing the young women bathing naked in a nearby pool and instead of turning instantly away, each pauses to watch.

Joining the models to swim one morning, Estella is shocked when they bathe naked (she and the maid have come in swimming costumes). Estella is further shocked when Devlin arrives on the scene and the naked women flirt with him, knowing that he cannot see them. On a later occasion, Estella observes the two models caressing the maid, and joins them in stroking her. She doesn't realise that her husband, walking nearby, observes this and is disturbed by the scene's sexual content. At another time, Estella observes Devlin sunbathing naked, and flees when she realises he knows she is there.

(Near the end of the film, Lindsay throws a yard tool toward Devlin, who catches it with one hand, indicating he may not be blind at all.)

Estella is increasingly affected by the sensuality of her surroundings and the bohemian attitude towards sexuality. Her relationship with her husband includes intimacy and commitment, but lacks passion.

The surroundings and the lives of the models are siren calls that lead Estella to fantasize with increasing intensity, and (with encouragement from the models) act on a few of her impulses. She suffers morning-after remorse about a late-night visit to Devlin. Influenced by supportive words from her husband, who had witnessed her earlier intimacy with the models, Estella shares a passionate moment with her husband.

While Tony is outraged to discover his wife's naked likeness included in one of Lindsay's paintings of a group of naked women, Estella merely observes that it is a good likeness, thus deflating her husband's moral outrage and threats to sue. The next day, Tony and Estella leave the bucolic compound. They travel back home on a train in a shared suite and, showing a changed attitude, Estella caresses Tony with her stocking-covered foot. She falls asleep on the train, and dreams she is naked on a cliff with the other women.

== Cast ==
- Hugh Grant as Reverend Anthony Campion
- Tara Fitzgerald as Estella Campion
- Sam Neill as Norman Lindsay
- Elle Macpherson as Sheela
- Portia de Rossi as Giddy
- Kate Fischer as Pru
- Pamela Rabe as Rose Lindsay
- Ben Mendelsohn as Lewis
- John Polson as Tom
- Mark Gerber as Devlin
- Vincent Ball as Bishop of Sydney
- Lexy Murphy as British Bulldog Girl

== Production ==
The film was a long-standing project of John Duigan:

The starting point was the idea of doing something on the tension between the church's teaching and the sensual side of life. I have always felt that the church's actual teachings on this issue—since I experienced it first-hand as a boy at school—reflected some biases, particularly against the place and role of women in the church, and the place of women's sensuality. I wanted to deal with these sorts of issues but I also wanted to explore them in a comic context. It's a film about sensuality but if you don't have a humorous aspect, then I think you're missing out on a particular dimension of the sensuality.

He originally pitched the project to Kennedy Miller after making Fragments of War but they passed.

Duigan said that what drew him to cast Grant: "Hugh has the capacity to be a terrific player of light comedy, in the tradition of Cary Grant and David Niven. He has the same ease and urbanity in the way he moves and talks." Grant told Farber what he brought to the character of the Anglican priest:

I kept looking at the part and wondered how I could crack it, because he was such a straitlaced character. And then I realized that if he thought he was trendy and avant-garde, that added a whole new swing to it. I see him as quite the star of his theological college, probably quite daring with his Turkish cigarettes. And I imagine that he even makes the occasional sexual reference in his conversation after a couple of glasses of sherry. But confronted with the real McCoy, in the form of Elle Macpherson without her clothes, he's hopeless.

Most of the film is set at what is now the Norman Lindsay Gallery and Museum, which was the original home of the real-life Lindsay with sequences filmed at the railway station at Mount Victoria, New South Wales and aerial shots of a restored New South Wales Government Railways passenger train hauled by locomotive 3801.

== Reception ==
=== Critical response ===
On the review aggregator website Rotten Tomatoes, 74% of 31 critics' reviews are positive, with an average rating of 6.3/10. Metacritic, which uses a weighted average, assigned the film a score of 64 out of 100, based on 20 critics, indicating "generally favorable" reviews.

Janet Maslin of The New York Times wrote: "Sirens is best watched as a soft-core, high-minded daydream about the liberating sensuality of art...[it] has an archly intelligent performance from Mr. Grant, who turns the priest's embarrassment into a real comic virtue. Ms. Fitzgerald, who made a strong first impression in Hear My Song, is again a forceful presence, even when acting out the story's giddy erotic fantasies." Maslin said the film "often verges on silliness and desperately overworks the symbolic importance of snakes. Still, it's hard not to enjoy a film whose most intellectually daring character—Mr. Neill's stern Lindsay—claims to have spent a previous life in Atlantis."

Hal Hinson of The Washington Post was less forgiving: he called the ideas presented by the film "warmed-over D. H. Lawrence" and the film, a "peculiar, not entirely undesirable sort of art-house hybrid, like a marriage between Masterpiece Theatre and Baywatch", citing "scenes, like the one in which Estella is brought to orgasm by the tender, knowing hands of a blind laborer, [that] are almost laughable."

Roger Ebert, guessing incorrectly that the inspiration for Neill's character was Augustus John, noted that Sirens has "no particular plot"; he also called it a "good-hearted, whimsical movie which makes no apologies for the beauty of the human body and yet never feels sexually obsessed."

== Year-end lists ==
- Top 10 (listed alphabetically, not ranked) – William Arnold, Seattle Post-Intelligencer
- Best "sleepers" (not ranked) – Dennis King, Tulsa World
- Honorable mention – Glenn Lovell, San Jose Mercury News
- Honorable mention – Michael Mills, The Palm Beach Post
- Honorable mention – Michael MacCambridge, Austin American-Statesman

== Box office ==
Sirens grossed A$2.8 million at the box office in Australia, £2.6 million in the United Kingdom, and US$7.8 million in the United States and Canada.

== Home media ==
Sirens was released on VHS on October 19, 1994, by Miramax Films. It was released on DVD by Miramax Films in May 1999 and Echo Bridge Home Entertainment in May 2011. Umbrella Entertainment released Sirens on DVD in May 2010 and later, on Blu-ray, in March 2013. The Umbrella Entertainment disc releases are compatible with all region codes and includes special features such as the theatrical trailer, script, press clippings, stills gallery, an ABC Lively Arts interview with Norman Lindsay, an informal home movie chat with Hugh Grant and John Duigan, and audio commentary with John Duigan and Sue Milliken.

== See also ==
- Age of Consent (film)
- Cinema of Australia
