= Age of consent (disambiguation) =

Age of consent is the minimum age at which a person is considered to be legally competent to consent to sexual acts.

Age of consent may also refer to:

== Books ==
- Age of Consent, a 1938 novel by Australian artist Norman Lindsay
- Age of Consent, a 1987 novel by author Joanne Greenberg
- Age of Consent, a 2016 novel by writer Marti Leimbach
- The Age of Consent, a 1995 novel by writer Geoffrey Wolff
- The Age of Consent: A Manifesto for a New World Order, a book by English political writer George Monbiot (2003)
- The Age of Consent, a 1998 non-fiction book by activist Robert H. Knight

== Films ==
- Age of Consent (film), a 1969 film directed by Michael Powell and loosely based on the Norman Lindsay novel
- The Age of Consent (film), a 1932 black-and-white film directed by Gregory La Cava

== Music ==
- Age of Consent (band), an English indie rock band
- Age of Consent (Virgin Steele album) (1988)
- The Age of Consent (album), debut album by British synthpop trio Bronski Beat (1984)
- "Age of Consent", a 1969 song by Australian singer Ronnie Burns
- "Age of Consent", a song by English art rock band 10cc from their 1995 album Mirror Mirror
- "Age of Consent" (song), from the New Order album Power, Corruption & Lies (1983)

== Other ==
- Age-of-consent reform, any of several movements to change the legal age of consent
