= Judith Colquhoun =

Australian screenwriter and novelist

- Born: Judith Firth; North Queensland, Australia
- Occupations: Screenwriter, novelist
- Children: 2

Judith Colquhoun is an Australian screenwriter and novelist, known for her work in television dramas and soap operas. Starting out on Bellbird in the 1970s, Colquhoun wrote for two ABC anthology series, followed by the 1978 television film A Good Thing Going. She wrote the children's miniseries Cornflakes for Tea, children's television series Saturdee, and the 1986 television film Hector's Bunyip. She also wrote the screenplay for the 1986 drama film Jenny Kissed Me. Colquhoun is perhaps best known for writing over one hundred scripts for A Country Practice, and was responsible for the death of Molly Jones (Anne Tenney), which became the highest rated episode in the show's history. She went onto write scripts for The Sullivans, Skyways, G.P., Ocean Girl, Home and Away and Blue Heelers. Throughout the 1990s and into the 2000s, Colquhoun wrote scripts for the soap opera Neighbours. In 1999, she created the miniseries The Farm. Colquhoun wrote her first novel Thicker Than Water in 2014, followed by a series of novels based on A Country Practice scripts. For her screenwriting work, Colquhoun won five AWGIE Awards and became a Life Member of the Australian Writers' Guild in 2007.

== Early and personal life ==
Colquhoun was born Judith Firth in North Queensland. She attended Abbotsleigh in Sydney. She studied production at the National Institute of Dramatic Art and graduated in 1962. She then became a film editor for ABC Television and a copywriter for radio.

Colquhoun is married with two children.

== Career ==
Colquhoun began her career writing scripts for the soap opera Bellbird throughout the 1970s. She was one of ten Australian writers commissioned by ABC to write stories for their 1972 anthology series A Time for Love. Her episode titled "Claire and the Counter Revolutionary" was the first to air on 29 March and starred Anne Pendlebury, Mark Albiston and Bruce Kilpatrick. In 1975, Colquhoun worked on another anthology series, Quality of Mercy for ABV-2. This time all seven episodes were written by female playwrights, including Lynn Bayonas and Anne Brooksbank. She co-wrote the 1978 television film A Good Thing Going with Don Harley.

Colquhoun then became part of the semi-regular writing team of A Country Practice. She wrote over one hundred episodes during her time with the serial. When Anne Tenney decided to leave A Country Practice in 1985, Colquhoun wrote her final episode in which her character Molly Jones dies from leukaemia. Of the process, Colquhoun stated "We all loved her, she loved the show, but Annie felt she had done her time and we understood that. When we finally wrote her final episode, everyone in the writers' room was shedding tears, including all the guys." The episode became one of the most "unforgettable moments" of Australian television, and the highest rated episode of the show with 2.2 million viewers, which was one-sixth of the population at the time. Television historian Andrew Mercado, writing for The Guardian, said that Colquhoun became known as the A Country Practice's "Queen of Death" for killing off Molly, her baby, and the majority of Dr. Terence Elliot's (Shane Porteous) family.

Colquhoun wrote the 1981 children's miniseries Cornflakes for Tea, for which she won an AWGIE Award for Best Original Children's Script. She co-wrote the adaptation of Norman Lindsay's 1933 novel Saturdee into the children's television series Saturdee, which aired on the Seven Network in 1986. She also wrote the 1986 television film Hector's Bunyip, which starred five actors from A Country Practice and was produced by JNP Productions. Colquhoun wrote the screenplay for the 1986 drama film Jenny Kissed Me, but when she refused to make changes to the script, the director Brian Trenchard-Smith brought in Warwick Hinds to rewrite it and even ended up writing and cutting some scenes himself.

Colquhoun also wrote scripts for The Sullivans, Skyways, Zoo Family, The Flying Doctors, G.P., The Man from Snowy River, Ocean Girl, Something in the Air, MDA, and Home and Away. Throughout the 1990s and into the 2000s, Colquhoun wrote scripts for Blue Heelers and Neighbours. In 1999, Colquhoun wrote the three-part drama miniseries The Farm for ABC. The series went into production in May 2000 and was directed by Kate Woods. In 2007, Colquhoun was a made a Life Member of the Australian Writers' Guild.

Colquhoun stopped screenwriting to write her first novel Thicker Than Water, which was published in 2014. During the publicity trail, she admitted to being "a trifle annoyed" when the majority of the questions were about Molly Jones's death. Thicker Than Water was "Highly Commended" at the National Literary Awards hosted by the Fellowship of Australian Writers. The following year, she wrote a series of novels adapted from original A Country Practice scripts. Published by Corazon Books, the novels were set at the same time as the television series and follow the same storylines in the episodes, with some slight tweaks. Colquhoun stated "When I was approached to write a series of books based on A Country Practice, I realised that it was over twenty years since my last visit to Wandin Valley. The memories came flooding back and it didn't take me long to say 'yes.'"

In 2025, the writing process of Molly's death in A Country Practice became the basis for the stage play How To Plot A Hit In Two Days at the Ensemble Theatre. Writer Melanie Tait spoke with Colquhoun for inspiration and actress Georgie Parker plays the character Judy, who is inspired by Colquhoun.

== Accolades ==
Year	Association	Category	Work	Result	Ref
1981	AWGIE Awards	Children's Original	Cornflakes for Tea	Won	
1983	AWGIE Awards	Television Special Episode	A Country Practice – "Road to Nowhere Pt. I"	Nominated	
1984	AWGIE Awards	TV Serial	A Country Practice – "When the Bough Breaks"	Won	
1988	AWGIE Awards	TV Serial	A Country Practice – "Licensed to Kill"	Won	
1990	AWGIE Awards	TV Serial	A Country Practice – "Bel Canto Pt. II"	Won	
1993	AWGIE Awards	TV Serial	A Country Practice – "A Kiss Before Dying Pt. II"	Won	
2003	AWGIE Awards	Television Serial	Home and Away – Episode 3473	Nominated	
