= Saturdee =

- Genre: Comedy-Drama
- Based on: Saturdee by Norman Lindsay
- Written by: Judith Colquhoun; Peter Hepworth
- Directed by: John Gauci
- Starring: Dominic McDonald
- Country of origin: Australia
- Original language: English
- No. of episodes: 10

Production
- Producers: John Gauci; Louise Hall
- Cinematography: Clive Sell
- Running time: 30 Minutes

Original release
- Network: Seven Network
- Release: 9 May – 11 July 1986

Saturdee is an Australian children's television series that first screened on the Seven Network in 1986, adapted from the 1933 novel by Norman Lindsay. The ten part series is set in the small fiction town of Redheap in the 1920s and tells the story of 12-year-old Peter Gimble and his friends. It was commissioned in 1985 and saw 200 children interviewed for roles in the production. It was filmed in Creswick and a nearby farmhouse. Saturdee was produced by John Gauci and Louise Hall, directed by Gauci and written by Judith Colquhoun and Peter Hepworth.

Of the first four episodes Barbara Hooks from the Age wrote "Some of the dialogue sounds dated and forced because it is delivered stiltedly, as if the young actors are speaking in a language foreign to them, which, of course, are in a sense they are." Adding "overall, performances are a pleasure to watch. Dominic McDonald has turned his first television role into a triumph and Christine Amor shines as Ma Gimble." Marie McNamara writing in the Age's Green Guide says "there are some glaring examples of over-acting and the humor tends to be a little labored. But Saturdee is still good value. It has a freshness, it holds the interest and I'm sure it will enthral young viewers."

== Cast ==
- Dominic McDonald as Peter Gimble
- Troy Sussman as Conkey Menders
- Tahnee Marks as Dolly Trimmer
- Tamsin West as Trixie
- Christine Amor as Ma Gimble
- Wade Coleman as Bluey

== See also ==
- List of Australian television series
