= Peter Scriven =

Australian puppeteer

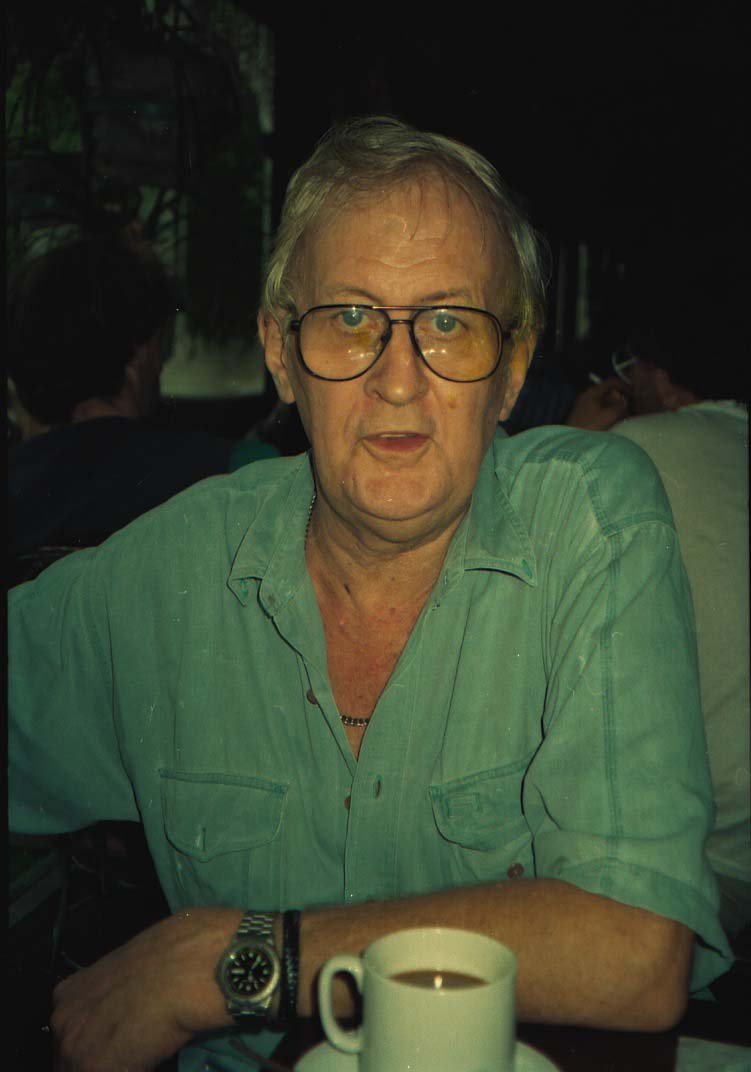
- Born: 28 September 1930; Melbourne
- Died: 1998 (aged 67–68)

Peter Scriven MBE (28 September 1930 – 13 October 1998) was an Australian puppeteer, writer and theatre producer, and the founding artistic director of the Marionette Theatre of Australia. Scriven played a huge role in establishing puppetry as a serious artform in Australia.

== Background and legacy ==
His The Tintookies and Little Fella Bindi toured all over Australasia. The Tintookies, from an Aboriginal word meaning 'little people who come from the sandhills', was an elaborate marionette musical first staged by creator Peter Scriven at the Elizabethan Theatre in Sydney in 1956. After the success of this production, Tintookie became the generic name for any of the puppets used by the Marionette Theatre of Australia, formed by Scriven under the auspices of the Elizabethan Theatre Trust in 1965. The board was chaired by Sir Howard Beale, president of the Arts Council, and included Dr H.C. Coombs, Dorothy Helmrich and Scriven, who was also artistic director. Apart from commissioning and presenting original Australian puppet works, the Marionette Theatre of Australia was to establish a training school, encourage the development of other groups, and import overseas companies.

The Marionette Theatre of Australia produced innovative large-scale puppet shows with an overtly Australian content for children for more than 20 years, including the landmark productions Little Fella Bindi (1958) and Norman Lindsay's The Magic Pudding (1960). Bindi, the Aboriginal boy lead in Little Fella Bindi was manipulated by Scriven. He was supported by a team of five young puppeteers supervised by Igor Hyczka, a stage manager, a sound technician and a tour manager, Tony Gould (later to head the Queensland Performing Arts Centre). Later productions included The Explorers (telling the story of Australian explorers, Burke and Wills) and The Water Babies. A film version of The Explorers was produced in 1968 by Scriven for Film World Pty. Ltd.

Scriven was highly dedicated even as a boy to marionettes. According to his teacher, William Dalziel Nicol, Scriven was one of the first students examined in puppetry after a course conducted by the Education Department in 1943 in Victoria, Australia.

Scriven was an entrepreneur and used his own funds to establish his marionette company. His legacy lives on through the marionettes from his Marionette Theatre of Australia, held in the archives of the National Institute of Dramatic Art in Sydney.

== Honours ==
Scriven was awarded an MBE in the Queen's Birthday honours list in 1970 for services to Theatre.

== Select Credits ==
- Nex' Town (1958) - musical

== Books and articles ==
- Billington, Michael (1988). Performing Arts: A Guide To Practice And Appreciation. London: New Burlington Books. ISBN 1-85348-115-7.
- Logan, David (2007). Puppetry. Brisbane, Queensland, Australia: Brisbane Dramatic Arts Company. ISBN 9780980456301.
- Tredinnick, David (2007). Tintookie Man, the Last of His Tribe: A Story of Peter Scriven Puppetry. Sydney, Australia: Australasian Drama Studies.
- Vella, Maeve; Helen Rickards (1989). Theatre of the Impossible: puppet theatre in Australia. Roseville, N.S.W: Craftsman's House. ISBN 0-947131-21-3.
