= Age of Consent (novel) =

1938 Australian novel

- Cover of the first American edition
- Author: Norman Lindsay
- Published: London: T. Werner Laurie Ltd. New York: Farrar & Rinehart, 1938; Sydney: Ure Smith Pty. Ltd., 1962

Age of Consent is a 1938 Australian comic novel written and illustrated by Norman Lindsay, in which the central character is a middle-aged painter, based loosely on the author, who travels to a rural township of New South Wales in search of scenic inspiration, but who meets instead a wild adolescent girl who serves as his model and muse. Age of Consent is dedicated to Howard Hinton. The book, first published in the United Kingdom and simultaneously in the United States, was briefly banned in Australia. It was adapted for the screen in 1969.

== Characters ==
- Bradly Mudgett – a Sydney artist, recently arrived at the little town of Wantabadgeree on the coast of New South Wales in order to paint seascapes; he has become cynical, and wants to recover his inspiration. He is forty years old.
- Edmund – Mudgett's fox terrier and only friend, with whom he holds frequent conversations.
- Cora Ryan – a local girl, described as a "child of nature", whom Mudgett encounters selling shellfish on a wild strip of Margoola Beach; although he initially wants nothing to do with her socially or sexually, her body strikes him as very paintable; she becomes his model and muse. She is described as adolescent, and while she claims to be seventeen when pressed by Bradly, the truth of her actual age is never made objectively clear by the author. Cora is the daughter of Dinny Ryan and Molly Spadget.
- Old Mother Spadget – Cora's gin-addicted maternal grandmother, described and drawn as a harridan, who is suspicious of Mudgett and accuses him of vile intentions regarding Cora; she dies a violent death. Spadget insists repeatedly that Cora is 'under age'. The age of consent in Australia was increased from 14 to 16 in 1910 but it's unclear whether the novel is meant to take place before or after that year.
- Young Podson – a runaway bank clerk who, having embezzled money, imposes himself on Mudgett and uses him to evade the police; Mudgett's Australian sense of mateship prevents him from turning out his "friend".
- Miss Marley – a lonely spinster, who is used by Podson.

== Reception ==
Sidney Williams wrote a positive review in ''The Philadelphia Inquirer'', praising the story as well as the illustrations: "Norman Lindsay has an advantage over other novelists in general. His drawings are no less pungent than his prose." The reviewer for the Chattanooga Daily Times compared the work favourably with Lindsay's previous effort, The Cautious Amorist. The Vancouver Sun called it a "delightful piece of whimsy".

Importation of the popular novel into Australia was, however, prevented by the Department of Trade and Customs, which readily confiscated copies of banned books at the docks and effectively acted as the national censor. This was the second of Lindsay's novels to be banned in his homeland, following Redheap in 1930. In November 1938 the case was referred to the newly-founded Commonwealth Literature Censorship Board for review. Age of Consent was "passed" by the new censor, which included several progressive voices, on 13 February 1939, following recommendations of its literary qualities made by Dr. Leslie Holdsworth Allen, Chairman of the Board; Kenneth Binns, the Parliamentary and National Librarian; and Professor Jeffrey F. Meurisse Haydon, lecturer in French and German at Canberra University College. Many sources erroneously state that the novel was banned in Australia till 1962; in reality, it was being advertised in Australian newspapers in 1939.

According to The Oxford Companion to Australian Literature, "Both Age of Consent and The Cautious Amorist are popular comic novels but limited by Lindsay's preference for adolescent sexuality."

== Sources ==
- Baxter, John (2009). Carnal Knowledge: Baxter's Concise Encyclopedia of Modern Sex. HarperCollins. p. 4. ISBN 9780060874346.
- Bruce, Joan (25 May 2017). "Age of Consent". State Library of Queensland. John Oxley Library.
- Lindsay, Norman (1994). Oakley, Barry (ed.). Age of Consent (Classic ed.). Australia: Angus & Robertson. pp. v–ix.
- Moore, Nicole (2012). The Censor's Library. St Lucia: University of Queensland Press. pp. 34, 122, 147. ISBN 9780702247729.
- Wilde, W.; Hooton, J.; Andrews, B. (1994). "Lindsay, Norman". The Oxford Companion to Australian Literature (2nd ed.). Oxford University Press. ISBN 978-0-19-553381-1.
- Williams, Sidney (16 July 1938). "Interesting Books for Summer Hours. Bradly's Defeat". The Philadelphia Inquirer. p. 26.
- "Lindsay Antics". The Minneapolis Star. 15 October 1938. p. 23.
- "Marooned Artist (Age of Consent)". Chattanooga Daily Times. 24 July 1938. p. 33.
- "New Novels". The Melbourne Age. 26 November 1938. p. 19.
- "The Bookshelf. The Age of Consent". The Vancouver Sun. 17 September 1938. p. 38.
