= Halfway to Anywhere (novel) =

1947 book by Norman Lindsay

- Author: Norman Lindsay
- Published: Sydney: Angus & Robertson, 1947

Halfway to Anywhere is a 1947 novel written and illustrated by Norman Lindsay. It is a humorous novel dealing with Australian adolescents. It the final part of a trilogy which began with Redheap and was continued in Saturdee. According to The Oxford Companion to Twentieth-Century Literature in English, "these novels, with their sexually vigorous young protagonists, comically depict small town life." The novel was adapted for the screen in 1972.

== Sources ==
- Sutherland, J. (1996). "Lindsay, Norman". In Stringer, J. (ed.). The Oxford Companion to Twentieth-Century Literature in English. Oxford University Press.
- Wilde, W.; Hooton, J.; Andrews, B. (1994). "Saturdee". The Oxford Companion to Australian Literature (2nd ed.). Oxford University Press.
