= A Curate in Bohemia (novel) =

1913 novel by Australian writer Norman Lindsay

- Author: Norman Lindsay
- Language: English
- Genre: Fiction
- Publisher: NSW Bookstall Company
- Publication date: 1913
- Publication place: Australia
- Media type: Print
- Pages: 192 pp.
- Preceded by: -
- Followed by: Redheap

A Curate in Bohemia is a novel by Australian writer Norman Lindsay. It was originally published by NSW Bookstall Company in Australia in 1913, and then reprinted by that company in 1915, 1920, 1921, 1932 and 1944.

The text was accompanied by 37 illustrations by the author.

== Synopsis ==
A young curate, Rev. James Bowles, has just been ordained and is in Melbourne on his way to his first cleric posting. He meets an old school acquaintance and falls in with a gang of Bohemians. The novel follows the curate's adventures, and changing attitudes, as he comes to terms with this new way of living.

== Critical reception ==
The Geelong Advertiser found the book to be of some entertainment value: "The Curate in Bohemia fairly bristles with bright things, and the illustrations alone are well worth the money. That so much genuine humor can be got out of the adventures of the luckless curate speaks volumes for the ability of the artist-author, who has so suddenly leapt into the literary limelight."

A reviewer in the Melbourne Leader was not impressed finding it "an example of debased humor which, both in its illustrations and the accompanying reading matter, is unworthy of the reputation which the author has achieved in his own special branch of art. He is regarded as Australia's foremost black and white artist, and has done work which justifies this distinction. But he is descending much below his level in giving his name to matter of this inferior nature."

== Publication history ==
After its original publication in 1913 in Australia by publisher NSW Bookstall Company the novel was later reprinted as follows:

- NSW Bookstall Company, Australia, 1932
- T.W. Laurie, UK, 1937
- Pacific Books, Australia, 1970
- Akron Paperbacks, Australia, 1972
- Angus and Robertson, Australia, 1981
- Angus and Robertson, Australia, 1991

== Adaptation for television ==
The novel was adapted for television in 1972 and broadcast by the ABC. It was directed by Alan Burke, from a script by Michael Boddy, and featured Bryan Davies, Reg Livermore and Ray Gurney in the lead roles.

== See also ==
- 1913 in Australian literature
