= Halfway to Nowhere =

- Based on: Halfway to Anywhere by Norman Lindsay
- Written by: Cliff Green
- Directed by: David Cahill
- Country of origin: Australia
- Original language: English

Production
- Producer: Alan Burke
- Running time: 60 mins

Original release
- Release: 1972

Halfway to Nowhere is a 1972 Australian TV play based on the coming-of-age story by Norman Lindsay. It was part of a series of five Lindsay adaptations on the ABC.

== Premise ==
Bill and Waldo, 16-year-old school boys, experiment with alcohol and women.

== Cast ==
- Alan Wilson as Bill Gimble
- Geoff Boon as Waldo Peddler
- Rosalie Fletcher as Polly Tanner
- Sally Cahill as Gertie Sparks.
