= Jenny Kissed Me (film) =

- Video promotional poster
- Directed by: Brian Trenchard-Smith
- Written by: Warwick Hind
- Based on: a screenplay by Judith Colquhoun
- Produced by: Tom Broadbridge
- Starring: Ivar Kants; Deborra-Lee Furness; Tamsin West; Paula Duncan; Steve Grives
- Cinematography: Bob Kohler
- Edited by: Alan Lake
- Music by: Trevor Lucas; Ian Mason
- Production company: Nilsen Premiere
- Distributed by: Hoyts Distribution
- Release date: 6 February 1986
- Running time: 108 minutes
- Country: Australia
- Language: English
- Budget: A$1.4 million
- Box office: A$1,824 (Australia)

Jenny Kissed Me is a 1986 Australian drama film directed by Brian Trenchard-Smith. The director calls it a "tearjerker for men". It is inspired by Leigh Hunt's poem Jenny kiss'd Me, which appears in the opening credits.

== Plot ==
Jenny is the ten-year-old daughter of Carol, who lives in the bush with Lindsay, a landscape gardener. Lindsay and Jenny have a very close relationship while Carol's relationship with Jenny is more fraught.

Carol is bored living in the countryside. Her friend, Gaynor, suggests she liven up her life by having an affair with neighbour Mal. This happens and Carol and Lindsay's relationship breaks up.

Carol takes Jenny away from Lindsay and goes to work at a brothel. Lindsay abducts Jenny, to Jenny's delight.

Lindsay gets terminal cancer. He and Carol are reconciled before he dies.

== Cast ==
- Ivar Kants as Lindsay Fenton
- Deborra-Lee Furness as Carol Grey
- Tamsin West as Jennifer (Jenny) Grey
- Paula Duncan as Gaynor Roberts
- Steven Grives as Mal Evans
- Mary Ward as Grace
- Maureen Edwards as Magistrate
- Terry Gill as Des Ormonde
- Gennie Nevinson as Drug Cop 3
- Nicholas Eadie as Steve Anderson
- Wilbur Wilde
- Peter Hosking as Fisherman

== Production ==
The film was funded by Nilsen Premiere, a subsidiary of the diversified industrial company Oliver J. Nilsen, based in Melbourne. This company had previously produced BMX Bandits (1983), which had returned 100% for its investors.

The film was based on an original script by experienced TV writer Judith Colquhoun (it was her idea to use the poem Jenny Kissed Me). The script was offered to Brian Trenchard-Smith who had directed BMX Bandits. Trenchard-Smith said he identified with the "human tragedy" of the story where a man came home and lost his partner and step daughter of the past six years overnight.

One important element in the film is commitment to family and children, as opposed to individual selfishness and the fear of loss of freedom. I was trying to show that the narcissism of the seventies can put a family into a private hell. The seventies had a trade-it-in, throw-it-away attitude towards relationships: if they don't work out, move on. Well, there's a price to pay for moving on when children are involved: you irrevocably damage their lives. And I'm suggesting that in Australia, where has been a 40% failure rate in marriages, there has been a fairly flippant attitude that hasn't really been thought through.

In his memoirs, Trenchard Smith called Colquhoun's script "a well-written, social issue drama, with a slow, spare, arthouse tone. Too little seemed to happen. Too many valleys, not enough peaks." He felt directing the script as written "would have displayed versatility" on his part, "an ability to do a Ken Loach social realism piece" which Trenchard-Smith said "might have been a good career move" for him. However, he wanted to make Jenny Kissed Me "less arthouse and more commercial, in the vein of a Douglas Sirk tearjerker" which the director felt would reach a wider audience. Trenchard-Smith wanted to "give the story more style" and "make the characters more sophisticated and the feeling more upmarket." Colquhoun refused to make the changes so the director brought in Warwick Hinds, a former Greater Union executive, to rewrite the script. The director then cut six pages, rewrote some scenes and wrote two new scenes of his own.

Continental Commercial Securities underwrote the budget which was originally reported as $1.3 million. Hoyts signed on as distributor.

Trenchard-Smith said producer Tom Broadbridge originally wanted Paula Duncan to play Carol, the female lead. Ivar Kants, who had just been in Silver City, was cast as Lindsay. Deborra Lee Furness read for the support role of Gaynor, Carol's best friend. Trenchard-Smith was very impressed wondered if she could play Carol instead, so had her audition for that role as well. The director was impressed and Furness and Duncan ended up swapping roles. Trenchard-Smith gave an early role to Wilbur Wilde, and cast Tamsin West, who he had worked with on Frog Dreaming, as Jenny.

Shooting started on 11 March 1985 and took place in Melbourne and Sherbrooke in the Dandenongs. The massage parlour scenes were shot at a real massage parlour in Melbourne, The Daily Planet.

== Reception ==
Trenchard-Smith claims the film's commercial prospects were "torpedoed" when the film was heckled at a screening for the AFI Awards. This was reported in The Sydney Morning Herald which claimed the film "was greeted with boos and hisses". Trenchard Smith says this report "had the effect of killing any enthusiasm Hoyts Theatres may have had for the movie."

Jenny Kissed Me screened in one theatre in Melbourne for a week, as per Hoyts' contractual obligations, then it was released to video and screened on Channel Seven. The film sold to video and television in Europe. Trenchard-Smith later said, "I am fond of the picture, a little florid and melodramatic perhaps, but I wanted to push the conventions of the 'weepie'."

Reviewing the movie for The Age, Neil Jillet wrote the film "is good for plenty of laughs though tears might have been what its makers had in mind. With its relentless concentration of bathos and banality, it achieves a certain pureness of style."

According to critic Adrian Martin, "Beyond its crisp and efficient direction (Trenchard-Smith is deft at cutting on movement), what makes the film intriguing, even fascinating, is precisely the vein of B movie melodrama... there is virtually no conventional or legible psychology; only a series of action-packed, sometimes barely motivated, behavioural “moves” by characters maintained, for the most part, as walking stereotypes."

Trenchard-Smith believed Jenny Kissed Me "is a better film than its reviews indicate but it does have a flaw that critics failed to note" which was he "made the mother [Carol] too unsympathtic, and too late in her redemption for the audience to engage with her."

== Notes ==
- Trenchard-Smith, Brian (2020). Adventures in the B Movie Trade. (kindle edition)
