= Pan in the Parlour =

1933 novel by Norman Lindsay

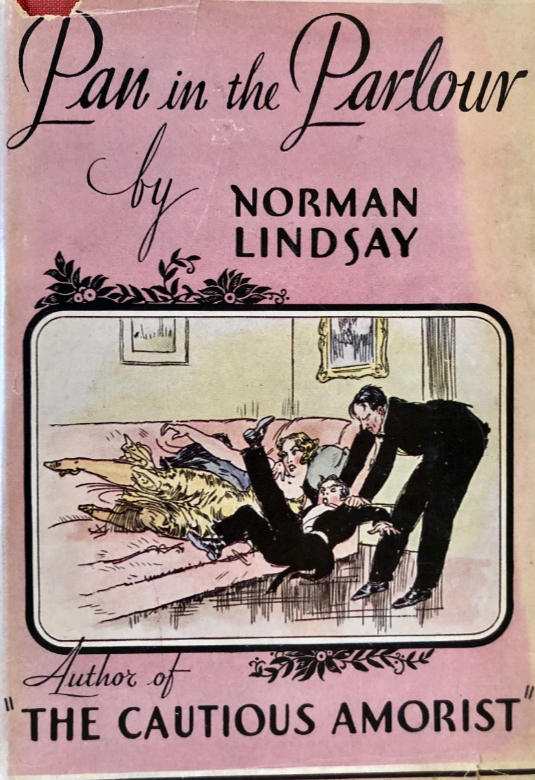
- Author: Norman Lindsay
- Published: New York: Farrar & Rinehart, 1933; London: Werner Laurie, 1934

Pan in the Parlour is a 1933 novel written and illustrated by Norman Lindsay.

== Sources ==
- Catton, Bruce (30 October 1933). "A Book a Day". Kenosha Evening News. p. 6.
- Lindsay, Norman (1933). Pan in the Parlour. New York: Farrar & Rinehart, Inc.
