= Our Girl Friday =

- Directed by: Noel Langley
- Written by: Noel Langley
- Based on: The Cautious Amorist by Norman Lindsay
- Produced by: Noel Langley; George Minter
- Starring: Joan Collins; George Cole; Kenneth More; Robertson Hare; Hermione Gingold
- Cinematography: Wilkie Cooper
- Edited by: John Seabourne
- Music by: Ronald Binge
- Production companies: Langley-Minter Productions; Renown
- Distributed by: 20th Century Fox
- Release date: 1 December 1953
- Running time: 88 minutes
- Country: United Kingdom
- Language: English

Our Girl Friday (U.S. title The Adventures of Sadie) is a 1953 British comedy film directed by Noel Langley and starring Joan Collins, George Cole, Kenneth More and Robertson Hare. It was written by Langley based on Norman Lindsay's 1932 novel The Cautious Amorist.

A woman is shipwrecked with three men on a deserted island.

== Plot ==
A ship collision results in four survivors from an ocean liner winding up on a desert island: spoiled heiress Sadie, lecturer Professor Gibble, journalist Jimmy Carrol and ship's stoker Pat Plunket.

Carrol falls in love with Sadie and she kisses him. Gibble falls in love with Sadie. This causes conflict between Carrol and Gibble that results in Sadie wanting to move to the other side of the island to live alone.

Gibble gets the wrong impression that Pat and Sadie are intimate. Pat finds a bottle of rum and gets drunk.

Sadie takes over as leader on the island. When the men threaten to strike, she declares that the group will never function until she marries one of the men. They draw straws and Gibble gets the short straw, but tries to back out in favour of Pat. Then a ship appears and the group is rescued.

Safe on the ship, Gibble falls in love with Sadie again and asks her to marry him. So does Carrol. However, Sadie is in love with Pat, but he refuses her marriage proposal, saying they are too different. But Sadie persuades the ship's captain that Pat is obliged to marry her, but before it can happen that ship goes down.

Sadie wades ashore at the same island where Pat has already arrived.

== Cast ==
- Joan Collins as Sadie Patch
- George Cole as Jimmy Carrol
- Kenneth More as Pat Plunkett
- Robertson Hare as Professor Gibble
- Hermione Gingold as spinster
- Walter Fitzgerald as Captain
- Hattie Jacques as Mrs Patch
- Felix Felton as Mr Patch
- Lionel Murton as barman

== Production ==
Film rights to Norman Lindsay's novel were purchased in 1948. The film was to be written and directed by Noel Langley and Robertson Hare was attached as a star. The original producer was John Sutro and the working title was Sadie was a Lady. Lucille Ball was going to be the female star. Then Jane Russell was going to play it. By now George Minter was producer and the title was The Girl on the Island. The film ended up not being made until several years later.

Joan Collins was borrowed from J. Arthur Rank to appear in the film. She wrote in her memoirs, "It was an absolutely gorgeous part. And funny, too. My yen to play comedy was developing. The script was hilarious and the three actors who were in it were important stars."

"I wore a bikini and no make up", said Collins later. "It was quite restful and more like a holiday than work." Collins later claimed that in this film she was the first actress to appear in a bikini on screen. Her character tears up a shirt into a makeshift one.

The movie was mostly shot on location in Mallorca, Spain, with studio work done in London. More's fee was £4,500. Filming began 22 June 1953.

Peter Sellers has an uncredited cameo as the voice of a cockatoo.

== Reception ==
=== Box office ===
Although the film was released after Genevieve (1953), which made More a star, it performed disappointingly at the box office. He later wrote the film "was not so successful as we had hoped. We had all enjoyed ourselves making it, but the result was a bit of a disappointment".

=== Critical reception ===
Monthly Film Bulletin said "This is a humourless comedy whlch makes little of its situation. The jokes are largely about Robertson Hare wearing a grass skirt and peeping at Sadie bathing in the sea."

Kine Weekly said: "Bizarre romantic comedy. ... The picture has quite an amusing shipboard opening in which Hermione Gingold, the guest artist, scores as a fluttering spinster, but its main action occurs on the island. Joan Collins' acting ability is somewhat limited, but she strips well as Sadie. Robertson Hare contributes a characteristic study as the snooty Gibble, George Cole makes every line tell as Carrol, and Kenneth More registers as the exuberant Plunkett. The staging is effective, but Noel Langley's treatment wavers. The play's early shafts, directed at social humbug, intellectual snobbery and modern civilisation, are aimed slightly too high, but once the humour descends to knockabout, laughs flow freely."

Variety said the film "does not come up to expectations".

Filmink called it "whatever".

Leslie Halliwell said: "Coy sex comedy for the family: pretty unbearable."

In British Sound Films: The Studio Years 1928–1959 David Quinlan rated the film as "mediocre", writing: "Flimsy comedy just about gets by on the characters of the stars. First film in Eastman Colour."

The Radio Times Guide to Films gave the film 2/5 stars, writing: "This is one of those films that you think you've seen before until you realise that all the oh-so-familiar scenes have come from many different pictures. The story of amorous castaways competing for a single woman makes for a one-joke movie, although George Cole and Robertson Hare are amusing as the no-hopers tilting their caps at Joan Collins's very sexy Sadie."
