= Tamsin West =

Australian child actress and singer (born 1974)

- Born: 7 March 1974 (age 52); Melbourne, Victoria, Australia
- Occupations: Actress, singer
- Years active: 1985–present

Tamsin West (born 7 March 1974) is an Australian former child actress and singer. She made her film debut as Jennifer Grey in Jenny Kissed Me and played Jane Cannon in Frog Dreaming. She is perhaps best known to television viewers as Linda Twist, a role during the first series in the children's television show Round the Twist. West was the first of three actresses to portray the role.

As well as appearing in children's television, West also appeared in Neighbours, as Kelly in 1986, and Emma Gordon between 1987 and 1988, and again in 1991, and guested on Blue Heelers.

On stage, she played Dorothy in The Wizard of Oz at the State Theatre in 1991. She was in the chorus for the 1992 Jesus Christ Superstar Australian arena production.

West performed the lead vocals on the Round the Twist theme song, which was used in all four series.

After her work on Round the Twist, West toured as a professional musician, playing the jazz circuit in London at least as far back as 2001. As of 2026, she regularly performs vocals as part of acts such as Tamsin West and her Savoy Ballroom band and the Joe Ruberto Quartet, honouring jazz legends like Peggy Lee, Doris Day, and Bessie Smith.

== Filmography ==
=== Film ===
| Year | Title | Role | Notes |
|---|---|---|---|
| 1986 | Frog Dreaming | Jane Cannon | Feature film |
| 1986 | Jenny Kissed Me | Jennifer Grey | Feature film |
| 1987 | A Place to Call Home | Jane Gavin | TV film |

=== Television ===
| Year | Title | Role | Notes |
|---|---|---|---|
| 1986 | Saturdee | Trixie | TV series |
| 1986, 1987–88, 1991 | Neighbours | Kelly / Emma Gordon | TV series |
| 1989 | Round the Twist | Linda Twist | TV series, season 1 |
| 1989 | The Magistrate | Bronwyn | TV miniseries, episodes: "Part 3", "Part 4" |
| 1994 | R.F.D.S. | Joanne | TV series, episode: "Outback Justice" |
| 1994 | Blue Heelers | Nina McVie | TV series, episode: "Sex, Lies and Videotapes" |
| 1995 | Janus | Lisa Prior | TV series, episode: "Confess and Avoid" |
