= The Magic Pudding =

1918 children's book by Norman Lindsay

- Frontispiece for first edition
- Author: Norman Lindsay
- Language: English
- Genre: Children's novel, picaresque novel
- Publisher: Angus & Robertson
- Publication date: October 1918
- Publication place: Australia
- Media type: Print
- Pages: 171

The Magic Pudding: Being The Adventures of Bunyip Bluegum and his friends Bill Barnacle and Sam Sawnoff is a 1918 Australian children's book written and illustrated by Norman Lindsay. It is a comic fantasy and a classic of Australian children's literature that has remained popular and continued to be adapted for film and theatre.

The story is set in Australia with humans mixing with anthropomorphic animals. It tells the story of a magic talking pudding named Albert, which, no matter how often it is eaten, continually reforms to be eaten again. He is owned by three companions who must defend him against Pudding Thieves who want him for themselves.

The book is divided into four "slices" instead of chapters. There are many short songs interspersed throughout the text, varying from stories told in rhyme to descriptions of a character's mood or behaviour, and verses of an ongoing sea song.

== Plot summary ==
Wanting to see the world and unable to live with his Uncle Wattleberry anymore, Bunyip Bluegum the koala sets out on his travels, taking only a walking stick. At about lunchtime, feeling more than slightly peckish, he meets Bill Barnacle the sailor and Sam Sawnoff the Emperor penguin who are eating a magic steak and kidney pudding which, no matter how much one eats it, continually reforms into a whole pudding again. The pudding is called Albert, has thin arms and legs, and is bad-tempered and ill-mannered. His only pleasure is being eaten, and on his insistence, Bill and Sam invite Bunyip to join them for lunch. They then set off on the road together, Bill explaining to Bunyip how he and Sam were once shipwrecked with a ship's cook on an iceberg where the cook created the pudding which they now own.

Later on, they encounter the Pudding Thieves, a possum named Patrick and a wombat named Watkin. Bill and Sam bravely defend their pudding while Bunyip sits on Albert so that he cannot escape while they are not looking. Later that night, sitting around the fire, Bill and Sam, grateful for his contributions of the day, invite Bunyip to join them and become a member of the Noble Society of Pudding Owners.

Later the next day, through some well-thought-out trickery, the Pudding Thieves make a successful grab for the Pudding. Upset and outraged, Bill and Sam fall into despair, and it is up to Bunyip to get them to pull themselves together and set off to rescue their Pudding. In the course of tracking down the Pudding Thieves, they encounter some rather pathetic and unsavoury members of society, but eventually manage to get led to the Pudding Thieves' lair. Bunyip's cleverness lures the robbers into a trap from where Bill and Sam's fists do the rest, and they retrieve their pudding.

Some time later, the Pudding Thieves approach the three Pudding Owners, proclaiming that they bear gifts of goodwill and will present them to the pudding owners if they would only look inside a bag they have with them. When doing so, they pull it over their heads and tie it up, leaving them defenceless as the thieves take their pudding and run off.

An elderly Basset Hound, market gardener Benjamin Brandysnap, comes along and frees the Pudding Owners. The bag had been stolen from his stable, and he joins the Pudding Owners to get revenge on the Pudding Thieves. Another clever plan by Bunyip lures them into another trap where the Thieves are given yet another battering and the Pudding is retrieved.

The next day, the travellers come to the sleepy town of Tooraloo, where they are approached by men dressed in suits and top hats and claiming to be the real owners of the Pudding. They turn out to be the Pudding Thieves up to yet another attempt at getting the Pudding, and the subsequent fight brings along the Mayor and the cowardly local Constable. In the argument that follows, the bad-tempered Pudding pinches the Mayor, who orders his arrest.

The Pudding is taken to court where the only officials present are the judge and the usher who are playing cards, but they prefer to eat the defendant rather than hear the case. To settle matters, Bunyip suggests that they hear the case themselves. Bill becomes the prosecutor, the Pudding Thieves are charged with the attempts to steal the Pudding and the theft of Benjamin Brandysnap's bag, and the Mayor and the Constable stand in as “12 good men and true” — conceding that the unconstitutionality of the court is "better than a punch on the snout". The proceedings do not go well, however, and result in utter chaos. When it is at its height, Bunyip suddenly announces that the Pudding has been poisoned. The judge, who has been eating away at the Pudding, goes suddenly crazy and attacks the usher, the Pudding Thieves, the Mayor, and the Constable with a bottle of port.

In reality, Albert was never poisoned, and the Pudding Owners take advantage of the confusion to beat a hasty retreat. They then decide that it would be best to settle down somewhere rather than continue traveling. They build a house in a tree in Benjamin's garden and settle down to a life of ease.

== Characters ==
- Bunyip Bluegum: an accomplished young koala
- Albert is the Magic Pudding.
- Bill Barnacle: A sailor.
- Sam Sawnoff: A penguin is a shipmate of Bill Barnacle.
- Patrick: A possum is one of the pudding thieves.
- Watkin: A wombat is one of the pudding thieves.
- Benjamin Brandysnap: a grocery store owner.
- Wattleberry is the uncle of Bunyip Bluegum.
- Rumpus A wise old koala friend of Bunyip Bluegum

== Illustrations ==
Norman Lindsay, a renowned artist, illustrated the book himself with numerous black-and-white drawings and also designed the cover. The original sketches can be seen at the State Library of New South Wales.

The Magic Pudding Sculpture by Louis Laumen, based on Lindsay's illustrations, is the centrepiece of the Ian Potter Children's Garden in the Royal Botanic Gardens, Melbourne.

== Significance and reception ==
The Magic Pudding is said to have been written to settle an argument: Lindsay's friend Bertram Stevens said that children like to read about fairies. At the same time, Lindsay asserted that they would rather read about food and fighting.

First published in 1918, The Magic Pudding is considered a children's classic, "frequently compared in its appeal to Lewis Carroll's Alice in Wonderland, to and continues to be reprinted. The first edition was sold as a ‘guinea book’ (21 shillings). It was a limited-edition, high-quality art book. Out-of-print outside Australia for many years, the book was re-issued in 2004 by The New York Review Children's Collection. In Australia a new edition was released in 2008 to celebrate the 90th anniversary of the book, and October 12 was declared "Pudding Day"; this new 2008 edition featured the original artwork as well as a biography, the first book reviews, letters between Lindsay and his publisher, and various recipes. In 2018, HarperCollins released a centenary edition, and the State Library of New South Wales opened an exhibition of Lindsay's original drawings for the book.

Philip Pullman has described The Magic Pudding as "the funniest children's book ever written" and as his favourite book.

== Adaptations ==
In 1960, Peter Scriven adapted the book as a puppet show, for which Lindsay produced 40 drawings. Scriven's Marionette Theatre of Australia continued to perform the puppet show around Australia until 1988.

An animated feature-length film adaptation was released in 2000, with John Cleese voicing the title role, Hugo Weaving as Bill, Geoffrey Rush as Bunyip, and Sam Neill as Sam. It deviated heavily from Lindsay's book, received mixed reviews from critics, and was not a financial success.

In 2010, Marian Street Theatre for Young People, based in Killara, NSW, presented an adaptation of Lindsay's script. Adapted by Andrew James, the production was the first to portray most of the characters in Lindsay's story using actors, rather than puppetry.

In 2013, Victorian Opera presented The Magic Pudding – The Opera. The music is by Calvin Bowman and the libretto is adapted from Lindsay's book by Anna Goldsworthy.

== Honours ==
In 1985, a postage stamp depicting an illustration from the book was issued by Australia Post as part of a set of five commemorating children's books.
