= Norman Lindsay Gallery and Museum =

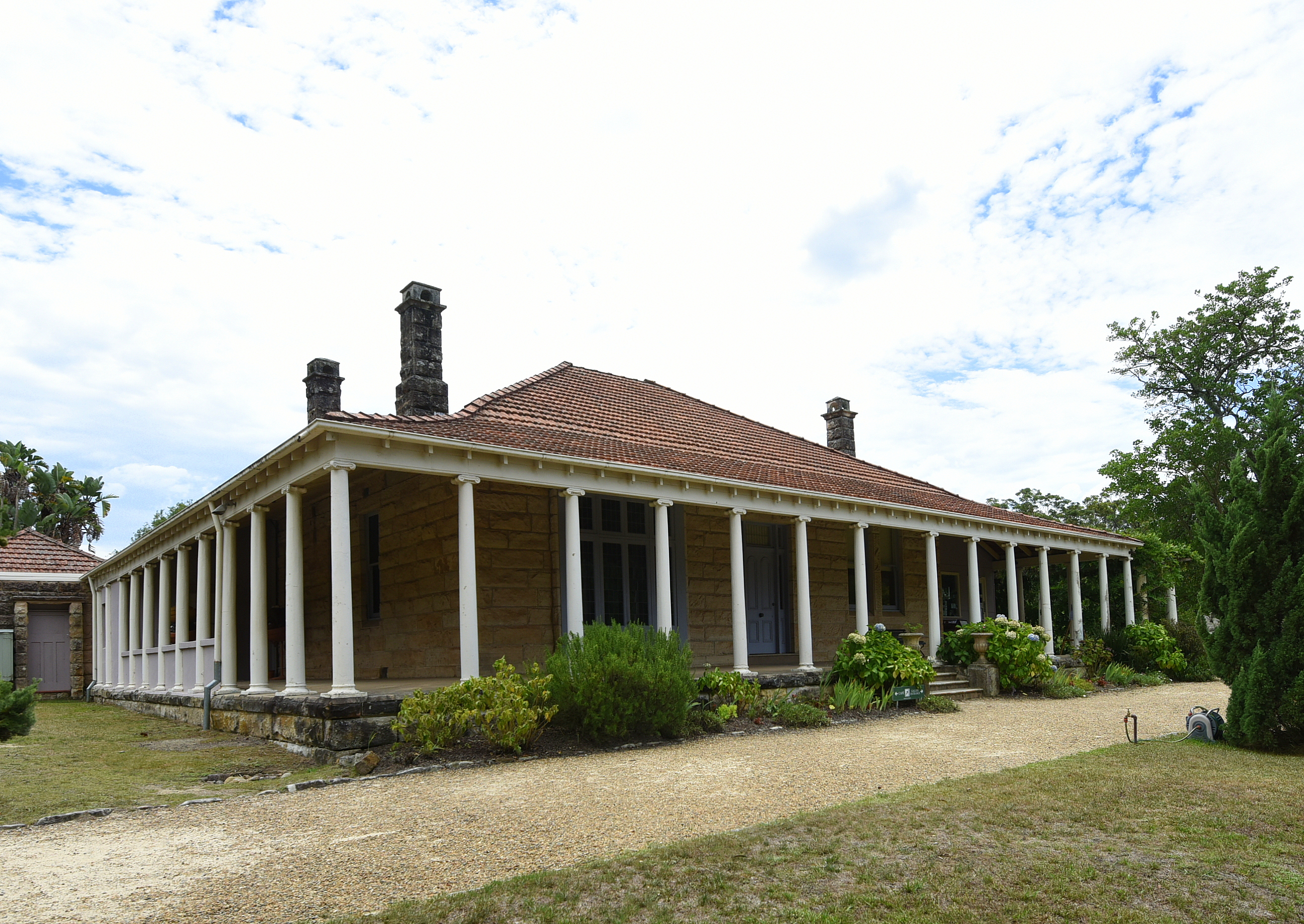
- The home of artist and author Norman Lindsay

- Location within New South Wales Location within Australia
- 33°40′45″S 150°33′40″E
- Location: 14–20 Norman Lindsay Crescent, Faulconbridge, City of Blue Mountains, New South Wales, Australia

History
- Built: 1898–1913

Site notes
- Elevation: 400 metres (1,300 ft) AHD
- Owner: National Trust of Australia (NSW)
- Website: normanlindsay.com.au

New South Wales Heritage Register
- Official name: Norman Lindsay Gallery; Maryville; Springwood
- Type: State heritage (landscape)
- Designated: 1 March 2002
- Reference no.: 1503
- Type: Historic Landscape
- Category: Landscape - Cultural
- Builders: Francis Foy; Patrick Ryan; Norman Lindsay; Rose Soady

The Norman Lindsay Gallery and Museum is the former residence and farmlet of Australian artist Norman Lindsay. Now an art gallery, tourist attraction and museum located at 14–20 Norman Lindsay Crescent in the Blue Mountains town of Faulconbridge in the City of Blue Mountains local government area of New South Wales, Australia. It was built from 1898 to 1913 by Francis Foy, Patrick Ryan, Lindsay, and the artist's wife, Rose Lindsay (nee Soady). The property, owned by the National Trust of Australia (NSW) (Community Group), is also known as Maryville and Springwood.

The site includes a stone cottage home on a 17-hectare (42-acre) and several smaller buildings, including two used by Lindsay as an oil painting studio and an etching studio. It was added to the New South Wales State Heritage Register on 1 March 2002.

The 1994 film Sirens, based on Lindsay's work and life, was filmed at the home and studio.

== History ==
The 17-hectare (42-acre) property was originally owned by Patrick Ryan, a local stonemason. In 1898 he sold the land, then called "Erin-go-Braugh" to Francis Foy, brother of Mark Foy, a Sydney entrepreneur. Soon after Foy commissioned Ryan to build a sandstone cottage, which his family used as a halfway house between Sydney and Medlow Bath, where Mark Foy owned the holiday retreat, The Hydro Majestic.

The house, renamed Maryville, was a small four bedroom construction with a roof covering of French tiles and a corrugated galvanised iron bullnosed verandah painted with red and white stripes, wooden support posts and iron lace brackets. There was a bow window on the left of the front door and a double hung sash window on the other side of the door. Because of the potential fire risk, the kitchen was a separate building. The kitchen was constructed from a different stone to that of the main building and was located on the highest point of the property. This siting suggests that perhaps the kitchen was the first building constructed, even when Ryan owed the property.

The front of the verandah was enclosed by a dry stone wall, which was later added to, as illustrated by the differing construction techniques. On the inside of the wall, in between the front gate and the driveway entrance, was a semi circular concrete bench under a gum tree. On one end was an iron urn and at the other was a circular stone with a hole in the middle. As it was not a very sound structure, it had been demolished by the 1930s. During this time the Foys owned the property, a number of outbuildings were constructed. A two bedroom cottage with a bathroom, verandah, and an open fireplace, known during the Lindsay era as "The Camp" was built as servants quarters. There was also a weatherboard structure to the west of "The Camp". although it is unclear whether this was built by the Foys or in the very early Lindsay years. This shed structure consisted of a stable, feed room, buggy shed, tool shed, milking bails and yards.

=== Purchase by the Lindsay family ===
The property was discovered by Norman Lindsay and Rose Soady in a dilapidated and overgrown state in 1912, and was subsequently purchased by Rose at the end of that year. Throughout 1913, many renovations were made to the building. Initially, new floorboards were laid to replace old ones, which had been eaten by termites. Then major constructions began, with the help of numerous locals including the Stattons. The bullnosed verandah and wooden posts were removed and replaced with an extended verandah covered with tiles imported from France to match those on the main roof. At the north eastern side, a two-foot wall was constructed on the outside edge of the verandah, approximately halfway along that side and green wooden venetian blinds were added to the front and side to make a sleep-out. Norman's design meant that the pitch of the roof was carried through to the verandah, and in conjunction with his interest in the classics, he cast many Grecian Ionic columns for supports.

It was also at this time that the wall between the two southwestern rooms was removed, thus creating the drawing room. The original bow window was also replaced with a pair of lead light French doors. Recesses were also made within the walls to accommodate Normans art works.

At the same time temporary wooden studio was built under a Moreton Bay Fig, where the courtyard is today. Whilst Lindsay used this studio, the construction of a more permanent sandstone studio was under way to the west of the main building, and further down the hill. This studio was a one-room construction with a closed verandah. This first studio was to later become the Etching Studio. Further down the hill were steps leading to a rectangular Roman style bath, apparently a pre-Lindsay installation on the location of a natural spring. It is possible that the bath was a Foy installation and a result of the family's interest in hydrotherapy.

It was not until 1915 that it was realised that the land on which the etching studio was constructed was not part of their property, so in 1916 the Lindsays rushed to Sydney to purchase the seven acres adjoining block, before the "actual" owners realised that there was a building on their property.

This period also saw the beginning of Norman Lindsay's project of populating the bush landscape of Springwood with nude statues. The first statue, of a female nude standing upright in an urn, was constructed and installed before the major works on the verandah began. Soon after the completion of the verandah and the front steps, Norman constructed two standing female nudes, which were placed on either side of the steps.

Between 1914 and 1916 construction of the swimming pool and the landscaping of the surrounding bush was in progress. The back wall of the pool was laid on bedrock, under which water seeped. There were also two cracks due to the formwork being taken away too soon. The filtration system consisted of fine wire netting through which the water flowed. The water was run off the property. There were also numerous terraces placed within the surrounding hillside, perhaps reflecting the influence that the English Romantic movement and notions of Arcadia had on Norman Lindsay's planning endeavors.

Soon after the completion of the swimming pool in 1916, the statue of seated women was installed at its edge. At the same time the statue of the "Satyr Pursuing the Nymph" was constructed and positioned in its current location. The statue of the nude with her hands behind her head as also of this era, though it was perhaps originally placed in another location and moved in the late 1930s.

In 1918, the present painting studio was built by Norman Lindsay and Percy Louden, a local man who worked on the property. In its original state, the studio was a one-room building, assembled from concrete and coke breeze bricks made by Lindsay. There was also a first level deck on the northeastern side, to which access was gained by a ladder through a trapdoor in the ceiling of the building still remaining. The deck had rigging of screens and an umbrella, but it was abandoned due to the lack of protection from the elements. It was at this time also that previous studio was dedicated solely to the production of etchings, reflecting the changing direction in Norman's art.

A statue installation of this time was that of the woman bending to dry her hair which was originally positioned directly in front of the new studio. It would have been soon after this that a bust was added to a head that was given to Norman by Francis Crossle, and which was subsequently installed to the left of NTA No 673. Later another bust was produced to match this one and was placed on the right hand side of NTA No 637, in front of the opening in the trellis which ran behind this statue group and in front of the studio. This trellis also hid the outhouse.

1920 brought the marriage of Norman and Rose and within two weeks the birth of their first child, Jane. This led to major changes to the house and grounds, and is perhaps this year that was one of the most important in terms the site's development.

The principal change was the addition of the four rooms at the rear of the main building. The four rooms consisted of a nursery on the northeast end. In keeping with Norman's original design, the roof and four rooms maintained the slope of the main buildings roof leading to the problem of very low perimeter ceilings in these rooms. At this time the bathroom was also built next to the kitchen, and the sleepout was glazed. The laundry was also in existence, which remains now in the form of the men's toilets. The Studio also underwent changes with the addition of a small fibro-asbestos storeroom at the back. Within this storeroom was a darkroom, with red and green windowpanes which could be dropped into places as required during film processing. Two years later a small bedroom was added, extending towards the northwest with a shed behind it, thus replacing the first floor deck.

In 1924 also bought major changes to the building. Initially a kitchen and the bathroom were renovated and tiled in a style designed by Rose. The original hexagonal pattern now remains only within the pantry adjacent the kitchen currently used as a storeroom. At this time Rose also tiled all the doorsteps, the fireplace, front steps and outside toilet. Contemporaneously with these renovations a temporary corrugated galvanised iron structure was erected west of original kitchen to house the old small fuel stove.

The most important development of this period was the construction of the courtyard behind the spare room and sewing room, and west of the kitchen. A high wall was constructed on the southwest end, which was blind except for small square windows on either side of the storeroom. The building of this storeroom which still serves its original function was undertaken during a period which was one of the most productive times for Norman and his art. Verandahs were constructed on the opposing northwest and southeast facing walls. The verandah supports are wooden posts with concrete bases, and when the courtyard was completed, awnings were added to the northwest facing verandah roof. It was at this time that a skylight was added to the sewing room due to the lack of light resulting from the courtyard construction.

Soon after, the Balinese dancer statue was installed as a centrepiece to the open grass area in the courtyard space, which was used from this time as the main entertaining area. Around this time in 1924, the statue of the women holding her breasts was constructed, and placed on a bench, which had first been constructed in the 1910s. The passageway from the dining room to the kitchen was also built at this time, with a gauze doorway giving access to both the courtyard and the Isabella grapevine pergola on the other side. This pergola extended across from the edge of the kitchen roof to the edge of the nursery roof, and must have been installed and planted soon after the construction of a garage next to the existing shed.

1928 had under taken numerous other developments. Perhaps the most important was the installation of the main colonnade pergola running south-east/north-west along the northeastern wall of the main building. The ionic columns making up the walkway were made by Norman in the tradition of his earlier renovations, and wisteria plants were added soon after. Using the same moulds, Norman also built the tank stand on the northwestern side of the studio.

A second bedroom and bathroom was added to the studio, which housed Jane in 1940s and the domestic staff at various other times, and a small square window was knocked out of the front wall to compensate for the limited light provided by the skylight. The shed was also extended to allow for Rose's second car.

Numerous changes to the garden had also eventuated by 1928. The two figures flanking the sides of the front steps were removed by Rose, as she believed them to be disproportionate to the rest of the facade. These were salvaged from the rubbish tip years later by the Lindayana collector Keith Wingrove, who repaired them and later donated them to the National Trust (NSW) when the bequest eventuated. The statues were replaced with two urns, which Rose purchased. The winged siren statue and the bench were installed in 1928 on the site of the roundhouse. It is not known when this building was constructed, though it was probably in the middle to late 1910s. The only remaining fabric is the concrete slab, upon which the bench and statue were placed.

Just before Norman and Rose left for the United States of America and England in 1930, one last addition was completed. The passageway between the ding room and the bathroom was constructed, resulting in the dismantling of the grape vine pergola, though remnants of the plants did remain. During this time there was also a bush pole and chicken wire screen planted with banana passionfruit, which ran from the corner of the laundry to the tank stand next to the studio.

After Norman and Rose left, "The Camp" was abandoned as the servants quarters when the Gassons, the staff of that time, moved into the house to take care of Jane and Honey Lindsay. Soon after, the building became infested with termites, until it was finally demolished around 1933. This period also spelt the end of the children's playhouse under the remaining Moreton Bay Fig. The playhouse had been built in the mid-1920s.

Upon Norman's and Rose's return from overseas and Norman's departure to 12 Bridge Street Sydney in 1934, a number of alterations came about, primarily instigated by Rose. With the intention of converting the studio to a gallery, she made some changes, starting with the bricking up of the small square window in the front, and having all of the exterior walls stuccoed. The original door was replaced with a reused historic cedar door, and the interior walls were lined with Hussein painted a bronze colour. A porch and picture rails were added, and the basin was removed to the back storeroom. This gallery idea never came to fruition, and the studio reverted to its former use upon Norman's and Janis return in 1940.

Following Norman's and Jane's return from Sydney in 1940 and following Rose's return from the United States of America in 1942, there was a further period of change for the property. In 1941, the statue of the woman bending to dry her hair was moved from its position at the front of the studio to its current location at the top of the stairs leading to the swimming pool, on the understanding that the move would be temporary until Norman could find another base. This rearrangement was to make way for Norman's latest creation, the three-figure statue of a female nude and two satyrs. It was around 1943 that the two statues of the satyr and the sphinx were constructed and installed in their positions marking the path to the bottom of the garden and the swimming pool.

In 1946 the property was connected to the town water supply, leading to the construction of Norman's first fountain, the seahorse. This fountain had running water before the house was connected. In that same year the wall between the dining room and the nursery was removed and the ceiling was renovated, creating the dining room as it is now. It was in this year also that drawing room was redecorated, with the painting recesses and gold wallpaper being removed, and the lounge suites recovered.

By 1949, the etching studio was no longer in use, due to the change in direction Norman had taken with his art, and so the seven-acre block and the studio were transferred to Jane's name. She consequently designed extensions to the studio for a house and commissioned Clarrie and Mick Stratton to build it. The cottage was constructed from locally quarried sandstone, and it was completed in 1950, as well as flagged paths and terraces. Jane Lindsay lived there, on and off until about 1956 when she and her husband Bruce moved to Hunters Hill.

At this time a septic system was installed at Jane's new house, and later at the main house. By this time the washing machine at the main house was located in the bathroom, indicating that the laundry was no longer in use.

In 1956 Rose moved to Hunters Hill with Jane and did not live at Springwood again. Late in the 1950s, when Norman was living alone; a bushfire came through and destroyed the shed complex. Soon after this, the painting studio began to leak so Norman moved into the house. From the late 1950s onwards he used the house as a virtual studio: keeping the model boats in the bedroom, using the courtyard for carpentry, cutting mounts in the sleepout and using the dining room for painting, writing and living. The spare bedroom he used for sleeping.

In 1968 Norman installed his final statue, a fountain with the figure of a reclining woman. This statue was constructed in the courtyard and lifted by a crane to its current position. By this time, Norman had decided that he wished to bequest the property to the National Trust of Australia, and consequently began making changes to the building, which continued, into 1969. These changes were the initial stages of the property's conversion to a gallery and museum. With the help of Harry McPhee, the "Sleep-out" was extended to the front wall and totally enclosed, with the addition of a counter for the use of a shop. The drawing room underwent major changes with the installation of Fluorescent lights and the blocking off of the windows and the French doors. Lindsay remained living on the property until his death in 1969, aged 91. The oil painting studio has been preserved as it was at the time of his death with unfinished oils and materials.

=== Acquisition by the National Trust of Australia ===
The property was purchased by the National Trust in December 1970 for A$50,000. In 1994 the property was used to film the movie Sirens.

During their period of residence at Springwood, the Lindsays created a body of work of national importance. Norman Lindsay was the artist and creator: Rose was the etching technician, nurturer and wellspring of Norman's artistic drive. Much of Norman's art was inspired by the physical form of their Springwood property; and his imagination peopled its landscape and provided a background for his art. The Lindsay's garden at Springwood, and their artwork, are the product of the same creative mind. The garden can be seen as a three-dimensional idealisation of the Lindsay's two-dimensional artwork. The conjunction of the artist's immediate environment and his artwork has a great deal to say about Lindsay's subject matter as well as his creative process. In a way, his pictures grew out of his imagination, but also required an element of the tangible; hence the use of models photographs and research files of magazine clippings in developing a work. In a similar way, Norman Lindsay's determined manipulation of the Springwood buildings, gardens and landscape consciously provided tangible forms, which informed his artwork, and provided imagery for them. Thus the house and garden have the rare ability to illustrate Norman Lindsay's creative process.

The Lindsay's Springwood property is, and was unique in Australia. The artist lived and worked there for most of his life. There are several other properties in Australia, which have connections with artists. At Hahndorf, in South Australia the house and studio of Hans Heyson has been maintained, but it has much more of a domestic sense than the Springwood property. The Arthur Boyd property at Bundanoon is now operated to include working artists. In Melbourne the home of the Reeds, at Heide near Heidelberg, includes a gallery for exhibitions and has a full-time curator. Daryl Lindsay's house at Mulberry Hill in Victoria is a National Trust property open for public visitation. The Springwood property is comparable to other historic artist houses, such as Musée Rodin in Paris.

In 2015 the National Trust completed a new state-of-the-art air-conditioning system in the gallery that will ensure the nationally significant artworks are displayed in museum-standard climate-controlled conditions, reduce energy consumption and operational costs. The gallery, along with Everglades and Woodford Academy were all represented in the Blue Mountains Winter Magic street festival which attracted over 30,000 people. Currently, Norman Lindsay's house and property is a popular tourist attraction in the Blue Mountains, not only for the art work on display but also for its gardens and bushwalks.

== Description ==
The Norman Lindsay Gallery is a sandstone building with terra cotta tile roof and a verandah on three sides. A colonnaded pergola is located on the north eastern elevation. An enclosed courtyard on the western elevation is adjacent to a kitchen and former bathroom which are separately connected to the house by enclosed breezeways.

The grounds are an eclectic mix of Blue Mountains hill station gardenesque and interwar domestic styles with idiosyncratic overlay of the work of the artist Norman Lindsay and members of his family in a park like setting surrounded by remnant native bushland. The garden is adorned with sculptures of nymphs, satyrs, sphinxes and female forms, fountains and urns. Formal hedges lead to particular statues and the extensive lawns are dotted with exotic specimen trees, mainly conifers and coral trees.

=== Condition ===
As at 30 June 2000, Physical condition is good. The site is largely intact.

=== Modifications and dates ===
- 2008: documentation and re-storage of NL ephemera collection completed. Federal funding secured to allow installation of water tank.
- November 2008-January 2009 National Trust Magazine (NSW): Funding was successfully sought from the commonwealth government, and from donors, to allow for the installation of a water tank, with work to be completed in the 2008-2009 year.
- November 2008-January 2009 National Trust Magazine (NSW): A significant project completed during the year was the documentation and re-storage of the Norman Lindsay ephemera collection.

== Heritage listing ==
As at 12 October 2000, The house, studios, grounds and bush walk comprise what we know as the Norman Lindsay Gallery Museum. The studios are intrinsically connected to Norman and Rose Lindsay, the Lindsay family generally, and the society of visitors and artists which the place attracted. The Norman Lindsay house and grounds occupied an important place in the artistic, literary and moral history of early to mid-20th century Australia: and as such the place is significant within a national context. The place provides potential to reveal the creative achievement of Norman and Rose Lindsay, and their family in integrating building, landscape and artwork. The landscaping of the grounds with fifteen fountains and statues, and the artworks and other contents of the house demonstrates the family artistic excellence.

Norman Lindsay Gallery was listed on the New South Wales State Heritage Register on 1 March 2002 having satisfied the following criteria.

The place is important in demonstrating the course, or pattern, of cultural or natural history in New South Wales.

The house, studios, grounds and bush walk which comprise what we know as the Norman Lindsay Gallery Museum, etching studio and grounds, are intrinsically connected to Norman and Rose Lindsay, the Lindsay family generally, and the society of visitors and artists which the place attracted. The Norman Lindsay Gallery Museum and grounds are historically significant because of the influence and activities of the National Trust of Australia (NSW), who have owned and managed the property since 1969–1970. The trust's custodianship and management of the Springwood property over the last thirty years has been informed by an evolving understanding of the property: and of the most appropriate interpretation of the place for the visiting public.

The place is important in demonstrating aesthetic characteristics and/or a high degree of creative or technical achievement in New South Wales.

The landscape and statues of the Norman Lindsay property is highly significant because it represents an eclectic mix of Blue Mountains hill station gardenesque and interwar domestic styles with idiosyncratic overlays of the work of the artist Norman Lindsay and members of his family in a park-like setting surrounded by remnant native Bushland. The garden is adorned with sculptures of nymphs, satyrs, sphinxes and female forms, fountains and urns. Formal hedges lead to particular statues and the extensive lawns are dotted with exotic specimen trees, mainly conifers and coral trees.

The place has a strong or special association with a particular community or cultural group in New South Wales for social, cultural or spiritual reasons.

The Norman Lindsay house and grounds occupied an important place in the artistic, literary and moral history of early to mid-20th century Australia: and as such the place is significant within a national context. This significance is exemplified by the continuing visitation by the public to this place.

The place has potential to contribute to an understanding of the cultural or natural history of New South Wales.

The place provides the creative achievement of Norman and Rose Lindsay, and their family in integrating building, landscape and artwork. The landscaping of the grounds with fifteen fountains and statues, and the artworks and other contents of the house demonstrates the family artistic excellence.

The place possesses uncommon, rare or endangered aspects of the cultural or natural history of New South Wales.

The property is rare in that it provides evidence of a former cultural phenomenon: and provides evidence of Norman and Rose Lindsay's artistic and social skills.

== See also ==
- List of museums in New South Wales
- List of single-artist museums
