= Saturdee (novel) =

1933 novel by Norman Lindsay

- Cover of the first edition
- Author: Norman Lindsay
- Published: Sydney: The Endeavour Press, 1933

Saturdee is a 1933 humorous novel, written and illustrated by Australian author Norman Lindsay, about mischievous Australian schoolboys and schoolgirls. It is part of a trilogy, together with Redheap and Halfway to Anywhere. The novel was adapted for television in 1986.

== Sources ==
- Wilde, W.; Hooton, J.; Andrews, B. (1994). "Saturdee". The Oxford Companion to Australian Literature (2nd ed.). Oxford University Press.
