= Rose Lindsay =

Australian author, artist and artist's model (1885-1978)

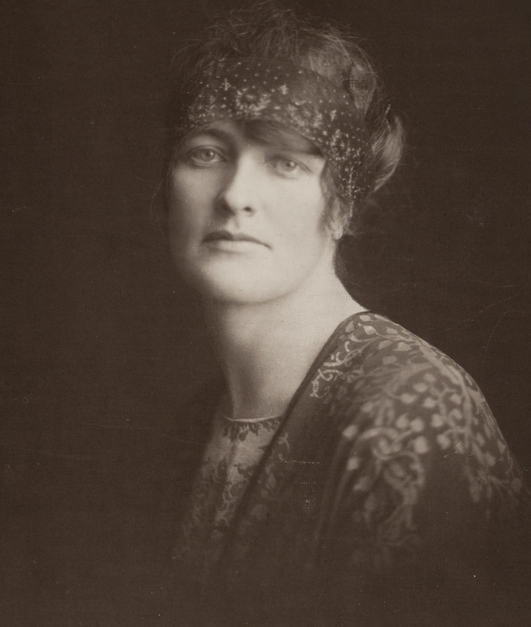
- Born: Rosa Soady; 5 July 1885; Gosford, New South Wales, Australia
- Died: 23 May 1978 (aged 92); Lane Cove, New South Wales, Australia
- Known for: Artist's model, printmaker, author
- Spouse: Norman Lindsay

Rose Lindsay (5 July 1885 – 23 May 1978), née Rosa Soady, was an Australian artist's model, author, and printmaker.

== Early life ==
Rose Lindsay (née Soady) was born in Gosford, New South Wales on 5 July 1885 and named Rosa. Her parents were John and Rosa Soady.

== Career ==
=== Artist's model ===
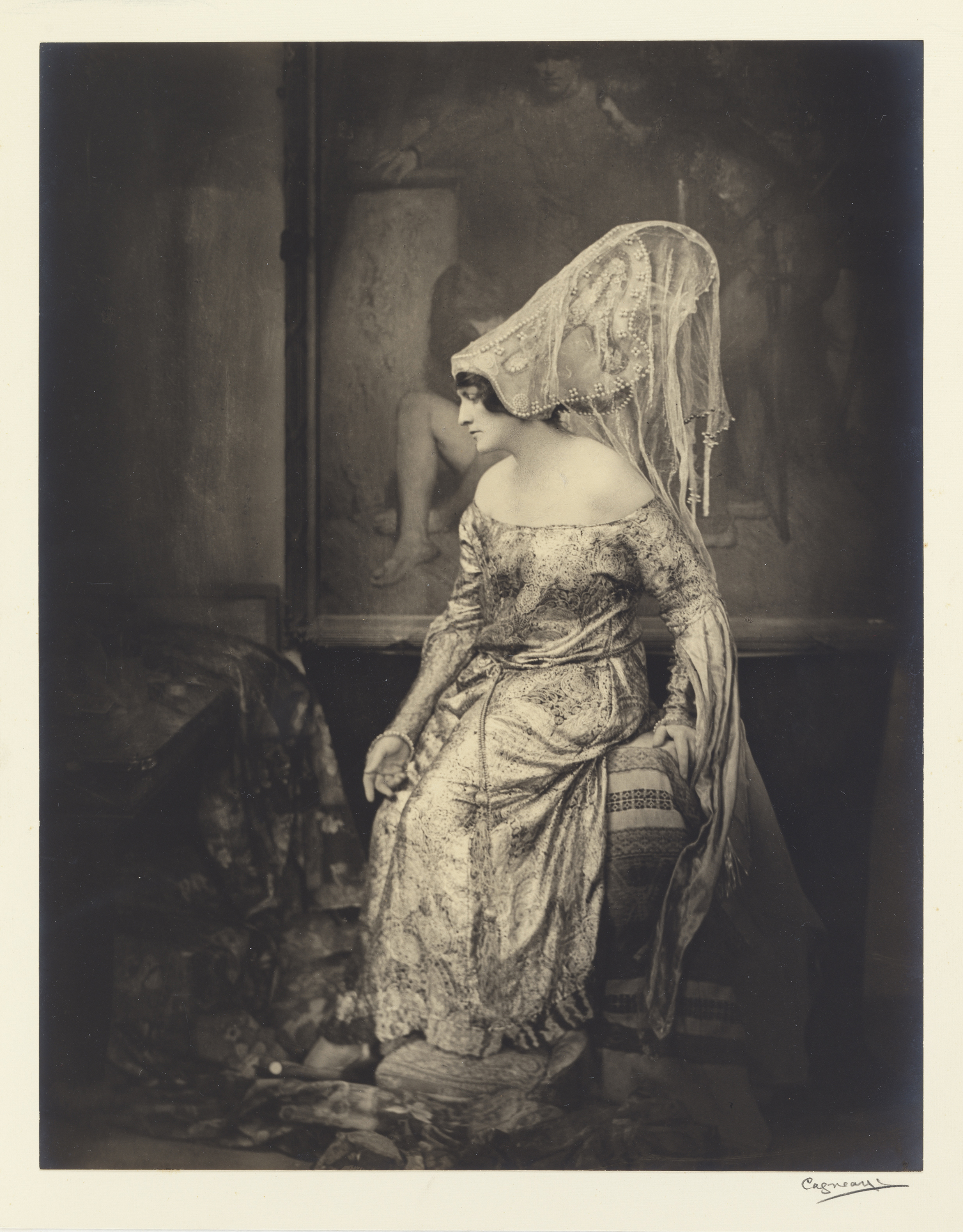
Rose Soady, Sydney, c.1920, by Harold Cazneaux

The Crucified Venus (1913)

She was introduced to Norman Lindsay in 1902 by Julian Rossi Ashton, and began modeling for Lindsay that same year. She became his principal model and later his lover, and after his marriage ended she joined him in London in 1910. She was Lindsay's business manager and most recognizable model, as well as being the printer for most of his etchings. In 1913 a pen-and-ink drawing she had posed for called Crucified Venus was shown at the Society of Artists' exhibition in Melbourne, but the Melbourne committee removed it from public view due to scandal over its eroticism. However, Julian Rossi Ashton, who was the president of the Society of Artists, said he would withdraw all the New South Wales paintings from the exhibit unless Crucified Venus was shown again, and it was put back up within the week. Rose also modeled for Julian Rossi Ashton, Harold Cazneaux, Sydney Long, Dattilo Rubbo, and Sydney Ure Smith. In 1926 Rayner Hoff sculpted a statue of her. Pictures of her are in Australia's National Portrait Gallery.

=== Printmaker ===
Rose was a skilled printmaker working with an etching press. In the 1960s Rose compiled seven albums of hundreds of pencil sketches and proof etchings by Norman Lindsay, an almost complete record of his etchings from the early 1900s until the 1950s.

=== Author ===
Rose wrote two autobiographical books in her seventies. Ma and Pa (1963) and Model Wife (1967) were later republished in a single volume as Rose Lindsay: A Model Life (2001).

== Personal life ==
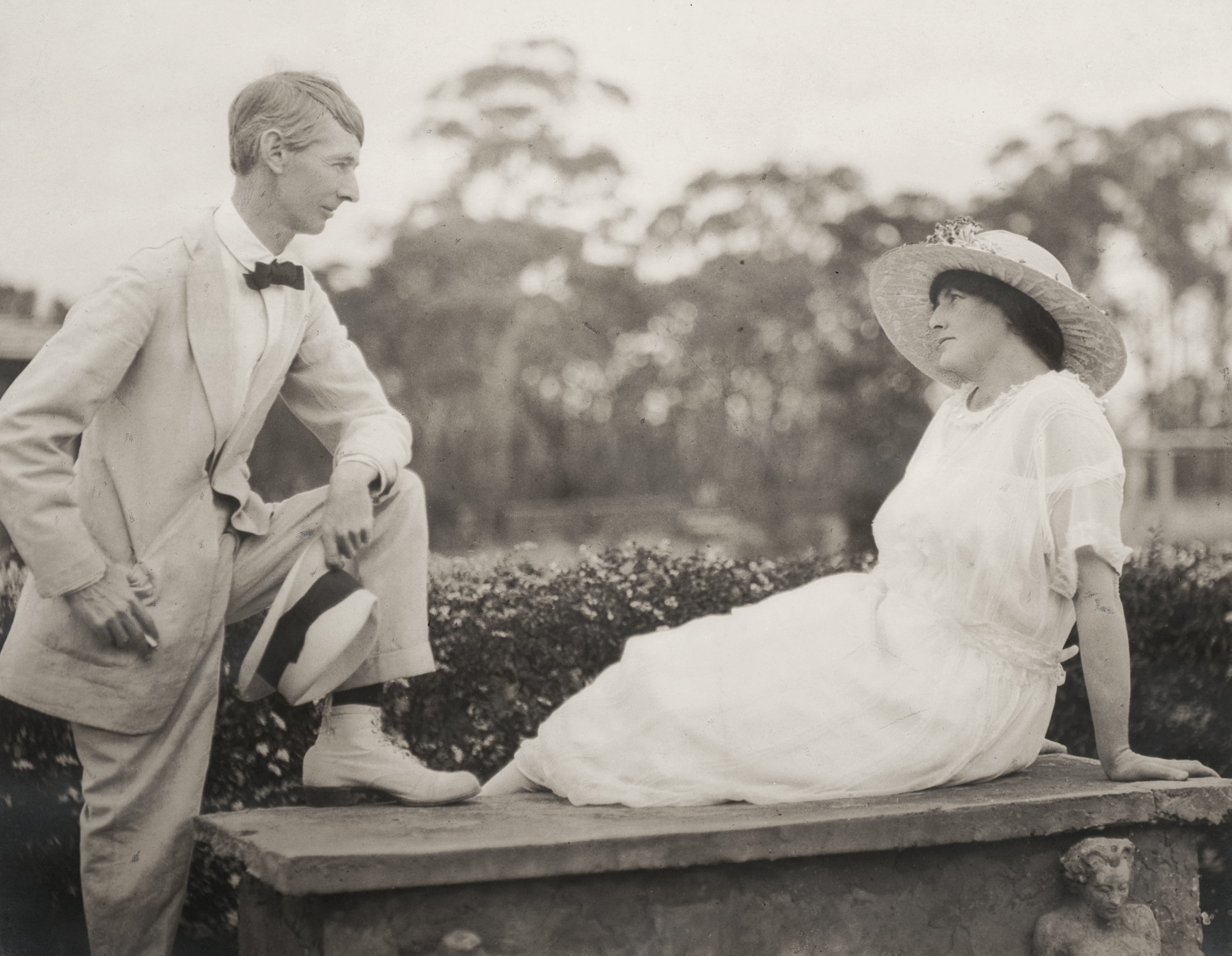
Norman and Rose Lindsay by photographer Harold Cazneaux ca.1920

Rose and Norman bought a house and built a studio at Springwood, and famous people including Miles Franklin, Henry Lawson, Nellie Melba, and Banjo Paterson visited them. They married in 1920, though their marriage was held two weeks before Norman's divorce became absolute. They had two children, Helen and Janet. In 1973 the Springwood property was bought by the National Trust of Australia and became the Norman Lindsay Gallery and Museum.

Rose Lindsay died on 23 May 1978 at an aged care home in Lane Cove.
