= The Cautious Amorist =

1932 novel by Norman Lindsay

- Cover of the British edition
- Author: Norman Lindsay
- Published: New York: Farrar & Rinehart, 1932; London: T. Werner Laurie, 1934

The Cautious Amorist is a 1932 novel written and illustrated by Norman Lindsay which explores the sexual tension between three men and one young woman stranded on a desert island in the South Seas. First published in the United States in 1932, and in the United Kingdom in 1934, the novel was banned in Australia from May 1933 to October 1953 on the grounds of indecency and blasphemy. The Cautious Amorist was adapted for the screen in 1953.

== See also ==
- Robinsonade

== Sources ==
- Lindsay, Norman (1938). The Cautious Amorist. T. Werner Laurie Ltd.
- "Banned Novel. Minister's Reply to Critics". The Sydney Morning Herald. 30 May 1934. p. 17.
- "The Cautious Amorist". State Library of Queensland. 11 May 2017.
