= Age of Consent (film) =

1969 film directed by Michael Powell

- US film poster
- Directed by: Michael Powell
- Screenplay by: Peter Yeldham
- Based on: Age of Consent by Norman Lindsay
- Produced by: Michael Powell; James Mason
- Starring: James Mason; Helen Mirren; Jack MacGowran
- Cinematography: Hannes Staudinger
- Edited by: Anthony Buckley
- Music by: Peter Sculthorpe (Australia); Stanley Myers (UK)
- Production company: Nautilus Productions
- Distributed by: Columbia Pictures
- Release dates: 27 March 1969 (Australia); 15 November 1969 (UK); 8 March 1970 (US)
- Running time: 106 minutes (Australia); 98 minutes (UK)
- Countries: United Kingdom; Australia
- Language: English
- Budget: $1.2 million or US$1,040,062
- Box office: $981,000 (Australia)

Age of Consent is a 1969 romantic comedy-drama film directed by Michael Powell. The film stars James Mason (who co-produced with Powell), Helen Mirren in her first major film role, and Jack MacGowran, and features actress Neva Carr Glyn. The screenplay by Peter Yeldham was adapted from the 1938 semi-autobiographical novel of the same name by Norman Lindsay, who died the year this film was released.

== Plot ==
Bradley Morahan (played by Mason) is an Australian artist who feels he has become jaded by success and life in New York City. He decides that he needs to regain the edge he had as a young artist and returns to Australia.

He sets up in a shack on the shore of a small, sparsely inhabited island on the Great Barrier Reef. There he meets young Cora Ryan (Mirren), who has grown up wild, with her only relative, her difficult, gin-guzzling grandmother 'Ma' (Carr Glyn). To earn money, Cora sells Bradley fish that she has caught in the sea. She later sells him a chicken which she has stolen from his spinster neighbour Isabel Marley (Katsos). When Bradley is suspected of being the thief, he pays Isabel and gets Cora to promise not to steal any more. To help her save enough money to fulfil her dream of becoming a hairdresser in Brisbane, he pays her to be his model. She reinvigorates him, becoming his artistic muse.

Bradley's work is disrupted when his sponging longtime "friend" Nat Kelly (MacGowran) shows up. Nat is hiding from the police over alimony he owes. When Bradley refuses to give him a loan, Nat invites himself to stay with Bradley. After several days Bradley's patience becomes exhausted, but Nat then focuses his attention on romancing Isabel, hoping to get some money from her. Instead, she unexpectedly ravishes him. The next day, he hastily departs the island, but not before stealing Bradley's money and some of his drawings.

Ma subsequently catches Cora posing nude for Bradley and accuses him of carrying on with her underage granddaughter. Bradley protests that he has done nothing improper. Finally, he gives her the little money he has left to get her to go away.

When Cora discovers that Ma has found her hidden cache of money, she chases after her. In the ensuing struggle, Ma falls down a hill, breaks her neck, and dies. The local police officer Hendricks (Michael Boddy) sees no reason to investigate further, since the old woman was known to be frequently drunk.

Later that night Cora goes to Bradley's shack, but is disappointed when he seems to view her only as his model. When she runs out, Bradley follows her into the water, and he finally comes to view her as a desirable young woman.

== Cast ==
- James Mason as Bradley Morahan
- Helen Mirren as Cora Ryan
- Jack MacGowran as Nat Kelly
- Neva Carr Glyn as Ma Ryan
- Andonia Katsaros as Isabel Marley
- Michael Boddy as Hendricks, the Police Officer
- Harold Hopkins as Ted Farrell
- Slim De Grey as Cooley, the Shopkeeper
- Max Meldrum as TV Interviewer
- Frank Thring as Godfrey, the Art Dealer
- Tommy Hanlon Jr. as Levi-Strauss, the art buyer
- Clarissa Kaye as Meg
- Judith McGrath as Grace
- Geoff Cartwright as Newsboy
- Hudson Faucett as New York Husband
- Peggy Cass as New York Wife
- Harold Hopkins as Ted Farrell

== Production ==
Norman Lindsay's novel had been published in 1938 and was banned in Australia. A film version was announced in 1961 by producer Oscar Nichols, who said he wanted Dan O'Herlihy and Glynis Johns to star. In 1962 Michael Pate had the rights but he could not get finance. He eventually sold them to James Mason and Michael Powell. They hired Peter Yeldham to write the adaptation.

Several changes were made from Lindsay's novel, including shifting the location from New South Wales to the Barrier Reef and making the artist a success instead of a failure. The bulk of the budget was provided by Columbia Pictures in London.

Before filming began on Age of Consent, director Michael Powell said about it:

My next film is the story of a painter who believes that he will no longer paint and of a girl who persuades him to begin again...He will probably end up painting her; but to see a painter sit down and paint a girl, this could be exciting, but I had the hardest time explaining to my scriptwriter that this didn't excite me at all. What interested me was the problem of Creation and the fact that this creation in the case of the painter was very physical. He will have to struggle, to fight, even more strongly than he will move away from reality. It will be a slightly bitter comedy that I will produce with James Mason who will play the leading role.

Powell and Mason had wanted to work together on I Know Where I'm Going!, but they had not been able to come to an agreement on billing and Mason was unwilling to go on location to Scotland. After Age of Consent Powell tried to recruit Mason for his version of Shakespeare's The Tempest, a project which never came to fruition.

According to Pate, it was originally intended to find an unknown 17-year-old Australian actress and cast her opposite Mason. Kathy Troutt, an Australian diver and model who later served as a dolphin trainer for Day of the Dolphin and as Brooke Shields' nude body double in The Blue Lagoon, was originally proposed to play Cora. In the end, 22-year-old Helen Mirren was cast in the role.

Artwork by John Coburn was used in the "New York gallery" scene, while paintings and sketches by Paul Delprat were used in the Dunk Island scenes.

James Mason met his future wife Clarissa Kaye on this film; she played the part of Meg, Bradley's ex-girlfriend in Australia. Their scene together was filmed in bed, and Kaye, who was recovering from pneumonia, had a temperature of 103 °F (39 °C). After the filming, Mason began corresponding with Kaye, and the two were married in 1971, and remained so until Mason's death in 1984. She was sometimes referred to as Clarissa Kaye-Mason.

Filming began in March 1968 in Albion Park racecourse and elsewhere in Brisbane, with location filming on Dunk Island and Purtaboi Island on the Great Barrier Reef off the coast of Queensland, and interiors shot at Ajax Film Centre in the Eastern Suburbs of Sydney.

Underwater moving picture photography was undertaken by Ron and Valerie Taylor as their first work for a feature film.

== Soundtrack ==
Australian composer Peter Sculthorpe's score was cut from the original release by Columbia executives who found it too unconventional. A new score was done by British composer Stanley Myers.

== Censorship ==
Although Age of Consent was released without cuts in Australia, and passed the British Board of Film Classification without any demands for cuts, the distributor, Columbia Pictures, decided to cut the opening bedroom scene between James Mason and Clarissa Kaye, and also some of Mirren's nude scenes, thus shortening the film from 106 to 98 minutes before it was released to the UK and US audiences. The Columbia executives also disliked Peter Sculthorpe's original score, so it was replaced with one by Stanley Myers. The original Sculthorpe score was reinstated when the film was restored in 2005. Despite the nudity from Helen Mirren, the film was shown intact in the UK with an “A” certificate, the equivalent of a modern “PG”, i.e. suitable for all but some scenes unsuitable for younger audiences.

== Reception ==
=== Box office ===
Age of Consent was a huge success in Australia, where it received generally favourable reviews, and drew sizeable audiences; it ran continuously for seven months at Sydney's Rapallo. The film took AUD 981,000 at the box office in Australia, which was equivalent to AUD 9,711,900 in 2009. It was the 13th most popular film in Australia in 1969. Filmink argued "I'm not sure audiences came for Mason, fine an actor as he was – it was more the scenery, and the racy subject matter, and a dozen other stars could have played that part as effectively."

=== Critical ===
Outside Australia critics were not very positive. Penelope Mortimer in The Observer wrote "I tremendously admire James Mason and believed, until I saw Age of Consent, that he could do no wrong...It is best forgiven and forgotten". The reviewer in Variety wrote that the "film has plenty of corn, is sometimes too slow, repetitious and badly edited...Yet [it] has immense charm, and the photography and superb scenery make it a good travelog ad for the Great Barrier Reef". Michael Powell thought the film had turned out to be too comic: "A sensual comedy. Not a big success, but interesting anyway."

Filmink argued the film "has never enjoyed the best reputation, in part because Columbia cut the film and added a terrible music score; there’s also some over acting from the support cast, it takes a while to get used to Mason’s accent, and the sexual politics are, ahem, of their time." However, "the film has life and warmth and we enjoyed it, especially the re-released copy which puts back the original score... I Powell directs with feeling, Mason and Mirren are charismatic... and it’s all easy going, laid-back and Queensland-ish. It’s absolutely worth seeing."

== Restored version ==
At the 2005 Sydney Film Festival, a fully restored version of the film was shown, with both the original Peter Sculthorpe score and the cut scenes reinstated. The restoration had been instigated by Martin Scorsese, a huge fan of Michael Powell, and was done by The Film Foundation, as part of their work to restore all of Powell's films, under the supervision of film editor Thelma Schoonmaker, who was Powell's wife from 19 May 1984 until his death in 1990. The restored version was released in the US on DVD in January 2009 as part of a double set of Powell films, paired with A Matter of Life and Death. The restored version is available on DVD in the UK, released by Sony Pictures, rated "12" by the BBFC and has the original score. It was also shown on TV. It premiered on Film Four in the UK in December 2012.

Umbrella Entertainment released a DVD of the restored version in Australia in July 2012 with special features including Martin Scorsese on Age of Consent, audio commentary with historian Kent Jones, the making of Age of Consent, Helen Mirren: A Conversation with Cora, and Down Under with Ron and Valerie Taylor.

== See also ==
- Cinema of Australia
