= Redheap =

1930 novel by Norman Lindsay

- 1934 edition
- Author: Norman Lindsay
- Language: English
- Publisher: Faber and Faber
- Publication date: 1930
- Publication place: Australia
- Pages: 317 pp.
- Preceded by: A Curate in Bohemia
- Followed by: Miracles by Arrangement

Redheap, also published as Every Mother's Son, is a 1930 novel by Norman Lindsay. It is a story of life in a country town in Victoria, Australia in the 1890s. Lindsay portrays real characters struggling with the social restrictions of the day. Snobbery and wowserism are dominant themes. In 1930 it became the first Australian novel to be banned in Australia. The novel forms the first part of a trilogy, together with Saturdee and Halfway to Anywhere.

The novel was adapted for television in 1972.

== Plot ==
The central character is Robert Piper, a nineteen-year-old man engaging in love affairs with the publican's daughter and the parson's daughter next door. In an attempt to prevent him falling into immorality and dragging the family along with him, Piper's mother arranges for him to be tutored by Mr Bandparts, a recovering alcoholic school teacher. The arrangement soon backfires and Mr Bandparts is soon drinking beer with his young pupil and chasing the corpulent barmaid at the Royal Hotel.

The reader is introduced to the rest of the Piper family. Mr Piper is a draper who continuously measures objects to calm his mind. His eldest son Henry has high hopes of taking over the business one day. Hetty is a domineering oldest daughter, who attempts to control the family morals and standing.

Ethel is a quiet younger daughter, who uses her shyness to cover her various seductions of young men around town. Grandpa Piper made the family fortune, only to be treated with contempt by the rest of the family. His small acts of revenge make some of the most comic moments of the book.

== Banning ==
The book was banned in Australia for 28 years, until 1958, after it was first published in 1930.

== Proposed film ==
The novel was optioned for the movies in the 1930s for £1,000, but no movie was made.

== Television adaptation ==
Redheap
- Based on: Redheap by Norman Lindsay
- Written by: Eleanor Witcombe
- Directed by: Brian Bell
- Starring: Peter Flett; Michael Boddy; Pamela Stephenson; Norman Yemm; June Salter; Kate Fitzpatrick
- Country of origin: Australia
- Original language: English
- No. of episodes: 3

Production
- Producer: Alan Burke

Original release
- Network: ABC
- Release: 27 October – 10 November 1972

The novel was adapted into a three-part mini series by the ABC in 1972. It screened as part of Norman Lindsay Theatre on the ABC, where works for Lindsay were screened over nine weeks. Three of the weeks were devoted to Redheap.

=== Cast ===
- Kate Fitzpatrick as Hetty
- Peter Flett as Robert Piper
- Michael Boddy
- Pamela Stephenson
- Norman Yemm
- June Salter
- Alexander Archdale
- John Morris
- John Wood
- John Waters as Jerry Arnold
- Jonathan Hardy as Henry
