= Norman Lindsay =

Australian artist, novelist and polemicist (1879–1969)

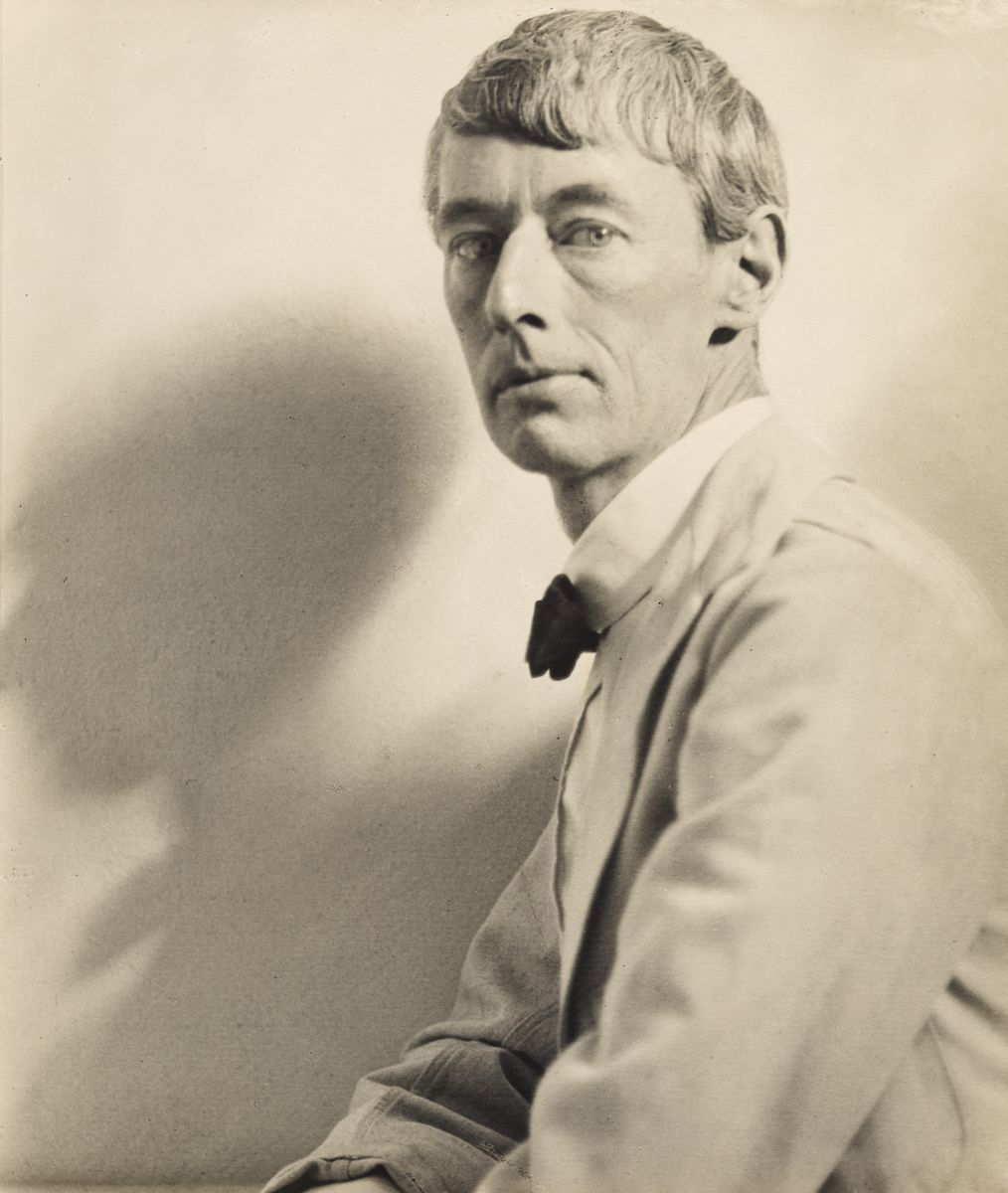
- Lindsay in 1921, photographed by Harold Cazneaux
- Born: Norman Alfred Williams Lindsay; 22 February 1879; Creswick, Colony of Victoria
- Died: 21 November 1969 (aged 90); Sydney, New South Wales, Australia
- Spouses: Kathleen Agatha Parkinson (m. 1900; div. 1920) Rose Soady (m. 1920)
- Children: Jack, Ray and Philip, sons of his first marriage. Jane and Helen, daughters of his second marriage

Norman Alfred Williams Lindsay (22 February 1879 – 21 November 1969) was an Australian artist, cartoonist, sculptor, polemicist, novelist, and amateur boxer. One of the most prolific and popular Australian artists of his generation, Lindsay attracted both acclaim and controversy for his works, many of which infused the Australian landscape with erotic pagan elements and were deemed by his critics to be "anti-Christian, anti-social and degenerate".

A vocal nationalist, he drew a weekly cartoon for The Bulletin from 1900 to 1958. As with many artists and writers of his generation he was profoundly influenced by the ideas of Friedrich Nietzsche and advanced staunchly anti-modernist views as on Australian art. When friend and literary critic Bertram Stevens argued that children like to read about fairies rather than food, Lindsay wrote and illustrated The Magic Pudding (1918), now considered a classic work of Australian children's literature.

Apart from his creative output, Lindsay was known for his larrikin attitudes and personal libertine philosophy, as well as his battles with what he termed "wowserism" (strict moral conservatism). On his death, Lindsay's home in the Blue Mountains, west of Sydney was left to the National Trust of Australia and is now known as the Norman Lindsay Gallery and Museum.

== Early life ==
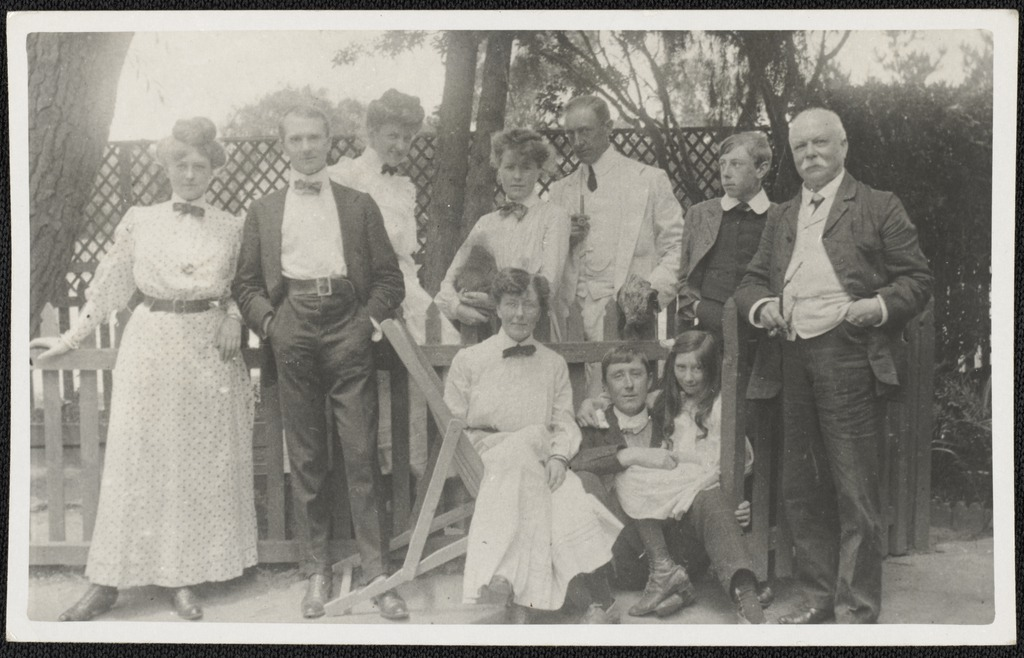
Portrait of the Lindsay family, ca. 1900 (6173408441)

Norman Lindsay was born in Creswick, Victoria, the fifth child of an Anglo-Irish doctor, Robert Charles William Alexander Lindsay (1843–1915) and his wife, Jane Elizabeth Lindsay (1848–1932). Jane Lindsay was the eldest daughter of the Thomas Williams, an amateur artist, who became a significant presence in the life of his Creswick grandchildren. The Lindsay children were all encouraged to draw. Percy Lindsay (1870–1952), Lionel Lindsay (1874–1961), Ruby Lindsay (1885–1919), and Daryl Lindsay (1889–1976) all became professional artists and drawings by Isabel Lindsay are in the collection of the Art Gallery of Ballarat.

For some years, it was a comfortable life for the Lindsays. Their wooden house, Lisnacrieve, was extended to accommodate the growing number of children, and later their grandfather. Daryl Lindsay wrote of the large vegetable garden, the paddock with a cow for fresh milk, the sitting room lined with books, and their mother encouraging the children to draw. For some years, Norman had a skin condition that reacted badly to the sun, so he spent more time indoors than his siblings, and drew.

Norman described his older sister, Mary, as "the dominant figure of my infant days". He was slow at learning to read, so she read to him.

== Career ==
The comfortable family life of the Lindsays ended in the early 1890s when Dr Lindsay's investments and savings were eliminated with the banking crisis. After Lionel moved to Melbourne on the half-promise of work as an illustrator, Norman pleaded to join him. In 1895, after Lionel agreed to look after him, Norman left Creswick for Melbourne.

His talent for drawing was soon recognised. In November 1895, the reviewer of the Victorian Artists Society exhibition wrote: "A quaint subject by a youth, Mr Norman Lindsay, has a touch of undeveloped genius about it". Two years later, his brother Lionel, who was the art critic of the The Tocsin, wrote that Norman Lindsay "is the most powerful and original of the younger school of Australian artists. His splendid capacity amounts to genius, and the promise of his early work–he is only 18 years old–should be fulfilled in a brilliant future".

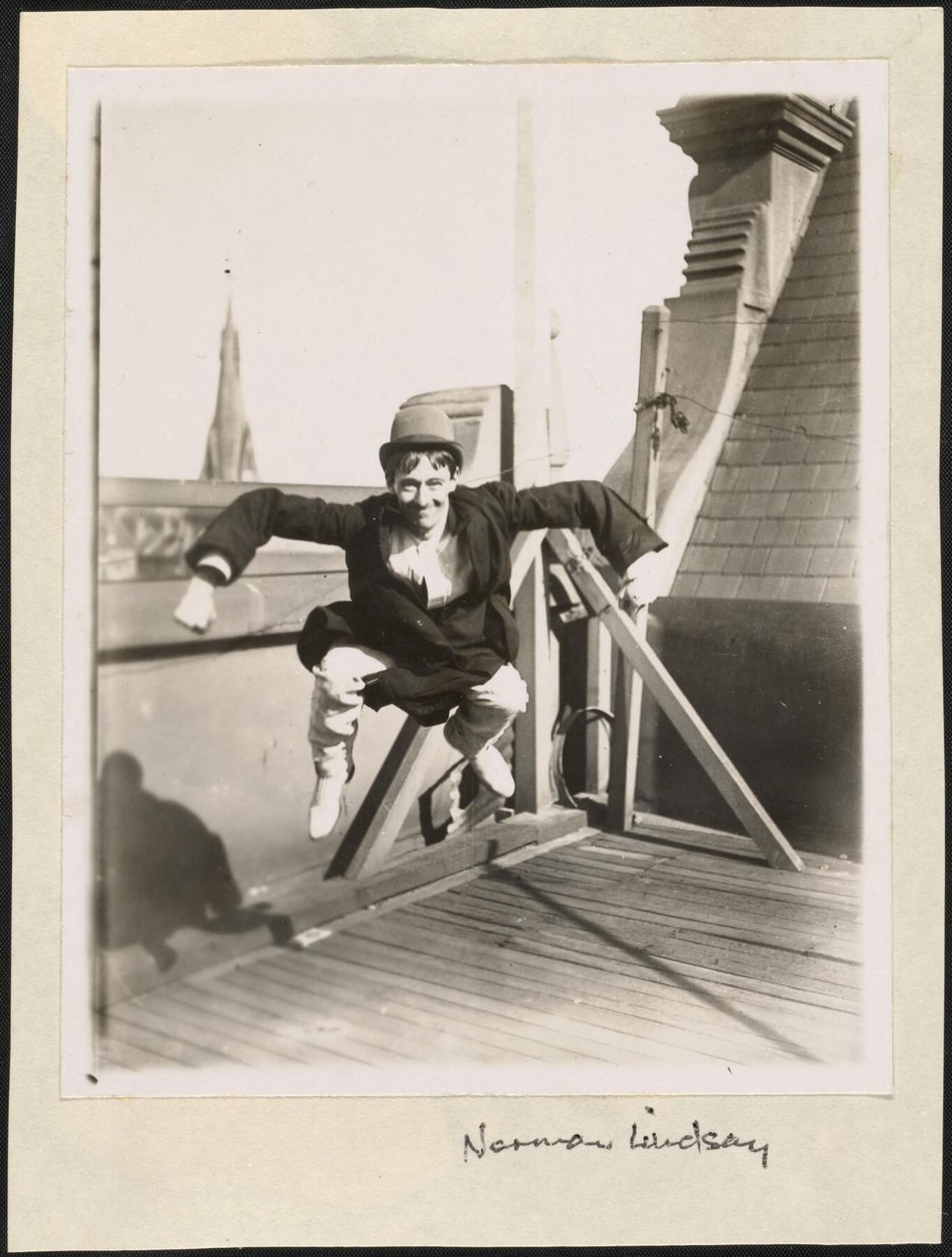
Norman Lindsay in a jumping position

It was a time of both poverty and adventure. The Lindsay brothers became part of a lively community of young artists and writers, which Norman later described in his 1913 novel, A Curate in Bohemia. The book contains thinly described pen portraits of many of his friends including brother Lionel, Max Meldrum and Hugh McCrae. When their friend, Ernest Moffitt died, Norman made the woodcut illustrations for A Consideration of the Art of Ernest Moffitt, which Lionel wrote in his honour.

In May 1900, Norman married Katie Parkinson, the sister of his friend Ray. Their son, Jack, was born five months later. His concern at having insufficient funds to support a wife and child was solved when Katie's brother, Jack Elkington,, took a folio of Norman's drawings to Sydney and arranged for them to be exhibited at the Society of Artists' rooms where they attracted the attention of A.G. Stephens of The Bulletin, Australia's leading magazine. His appointment as The Bulletin's cartoonist, which lasted for 58 years, soon made Norman Lindsay a household name.

In 1903, when Katie returned to Melbourne to be with her family for the birth of Raymond.,her second child, Norman and Will Dyson created a ménage à trois with the young artist's model, Rose Soady. Rose later dropped Dyson from the arrangement, which led to ongoing bitterness. The early months of his relationship with Rose were later fictionalised in his 1932 novel, The Cautious Amorist. Later, when Dyson married Ruby Lindsay, the couple refused to know Rose.

Norman Lindsay travelled to Europe in 1909, accompanying the newly married Will Dyson and Ruby Lindsay. Katie stayed in Sydney with the children. Rose joined him later. In Naples Norman began to draw 100 pen-and-ink illustrations for Petronius' Satyricon.. In London he visited the then South Kensington Museum where he made sketches of model ships in the museum's collection stimulated a lifelong interest in ship models. He found little interest in his art in London; so in 1911, the couple returned to Australia.

Norman was hospitalised with pneumonia on his return. Because of ongoing concerns for his health in Sydney's humidity, as well as the scandal of his relationship with Rose, they relocated to the Blue Mountains, where he bought an old stone cottage at Faulconbridge. Here he lived for (most) of the rest of his life.

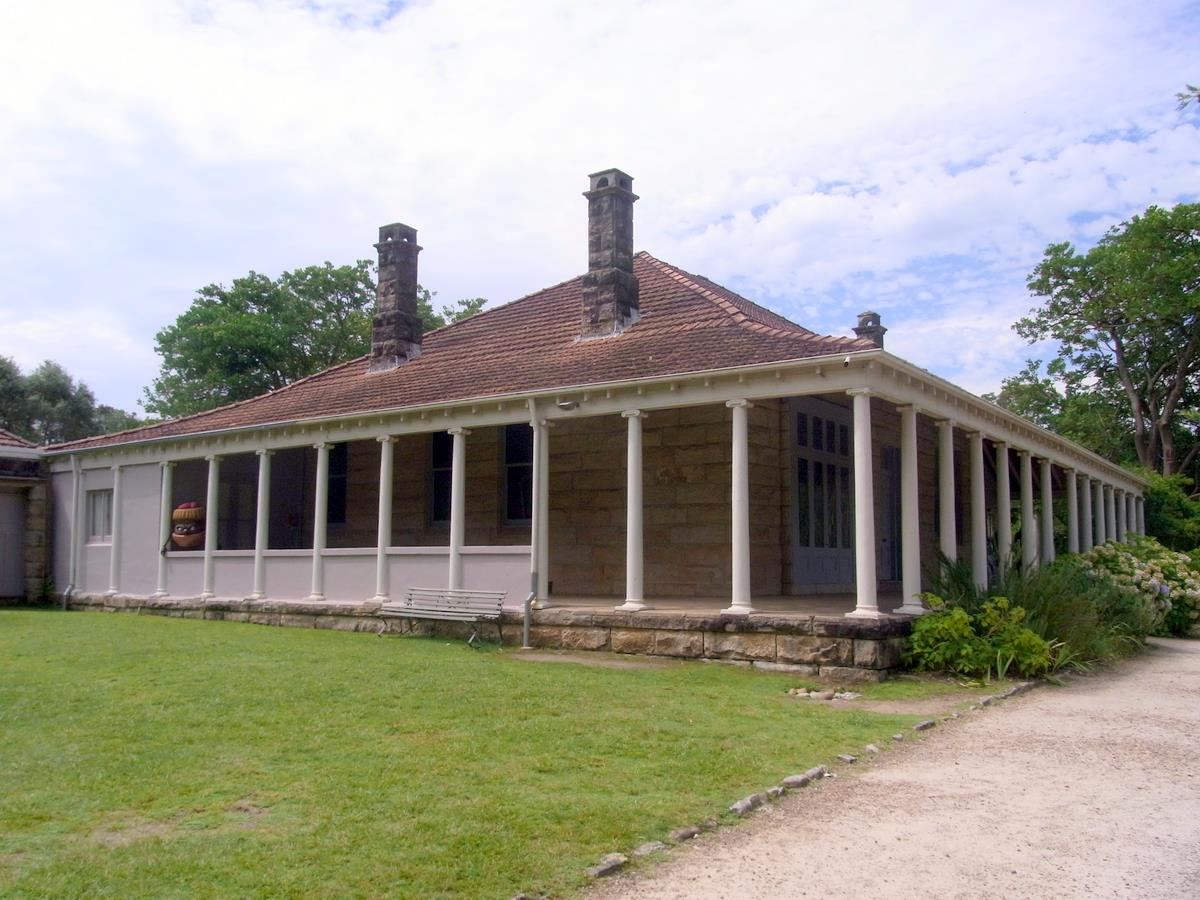
Norman Lindsay House

Dr Robert Lindsay died in September 1915. Norman visited Creswick for his father's funeral, and started to think of writing a novel about adolescence and life in this little gold mining town. He also spent some time with his brother Reg, newly enlisted in the AIF, and noticed how handsome he was, and how the eyes of all the girls followed him as they walked down the street..

Reg Lindsay was killed in France on 31 December 1916. Some weeks after being told of his brother’s death, Norman Lindsay received a letter from Reg, dated 29 December, telling his brother to "hit the Hun for six".. Norman could not accept the reality of his brother's death. He turned to spiritualism, holding long conversations with Reg via a ouija board. Many of Norman Lindsay's World War I recruitment posters show a square jawed young soldier, looking remarkably like Reg Lindsay.

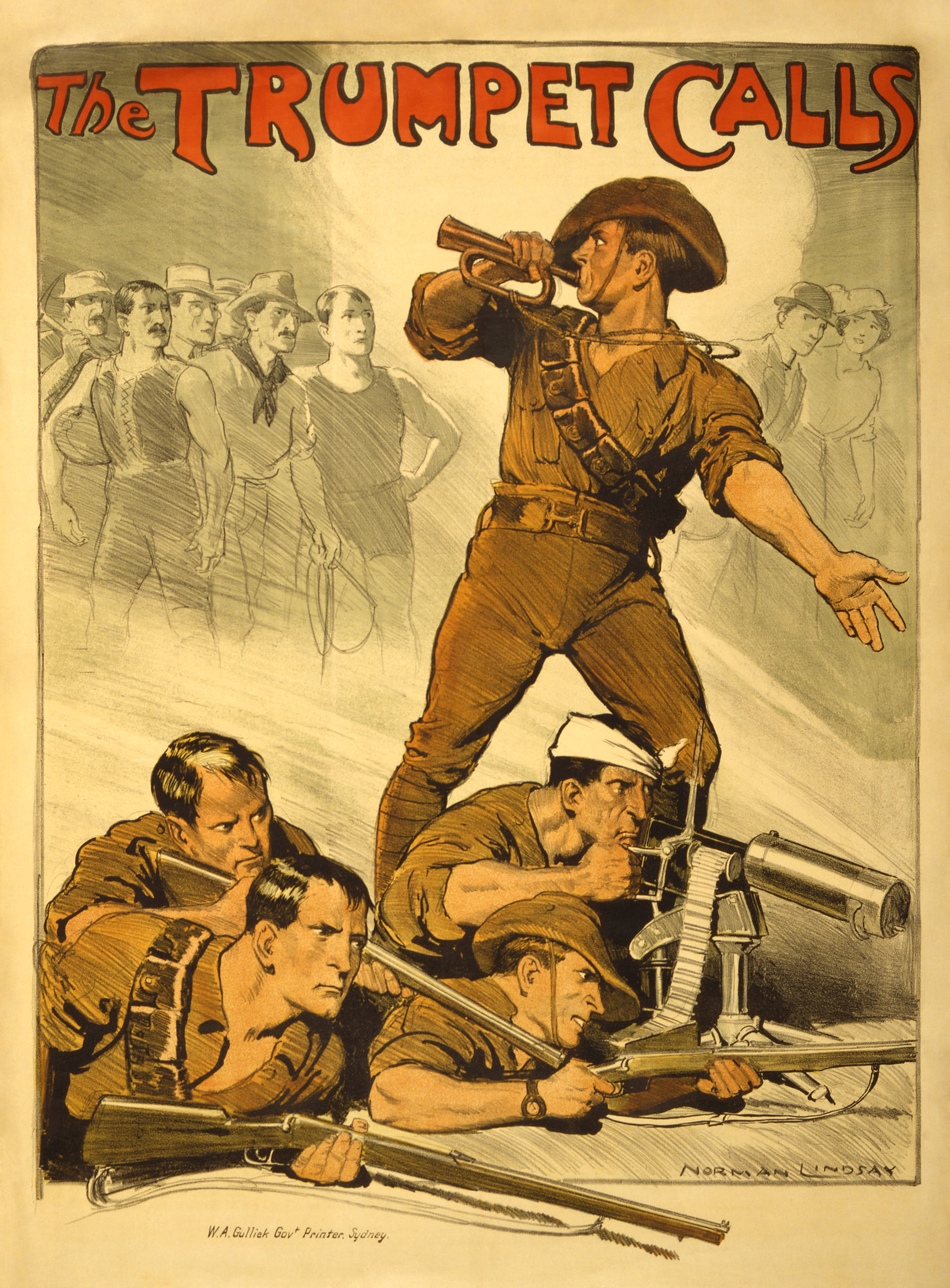
Norman Lindsay, The trumpet calls, 1914-1918, National Library of Australia.

In 1897 Lionel Lindsay had bought the first English translation Nietszche's Thus Spoke Zarathustra, enthusiastically reading extracts to his brother and their friends, including the poet, Hugh McCrae. Now, as he tried to make sense of a world where so many young men had died, but art survived, he wrote a polemic.

Many younger writers, especially poets, were enticed by Lindsay's philosophy, as expressed in Creative Effort. From the 1920s until the very end of his life in 1969, there was a steady procession coming to sit at his feet. They included his son Jack, Kenneth Slessor, Douglas Stewart, Francis Webb and many others undertook the pilgrimage to Springwood. When Jack Lindsay, emigrated to England, he established Fanfrolico Press, to issue books illustrated by Lindsay, in celebration of his philosophy.

In the aftermath of the death of his brother, Norman Lindsay wrote the children's book, The Magic Pudding, basing both the character and the appearance of the hero koala, Bunyip Bluegum, on his late father. The book was published in 1918, the year he initiated the divorce from Katie. On 14 January 1920, two weeks before the divorce was finalised, Norman married Rose. Their daughter, Jane, was born soon after.

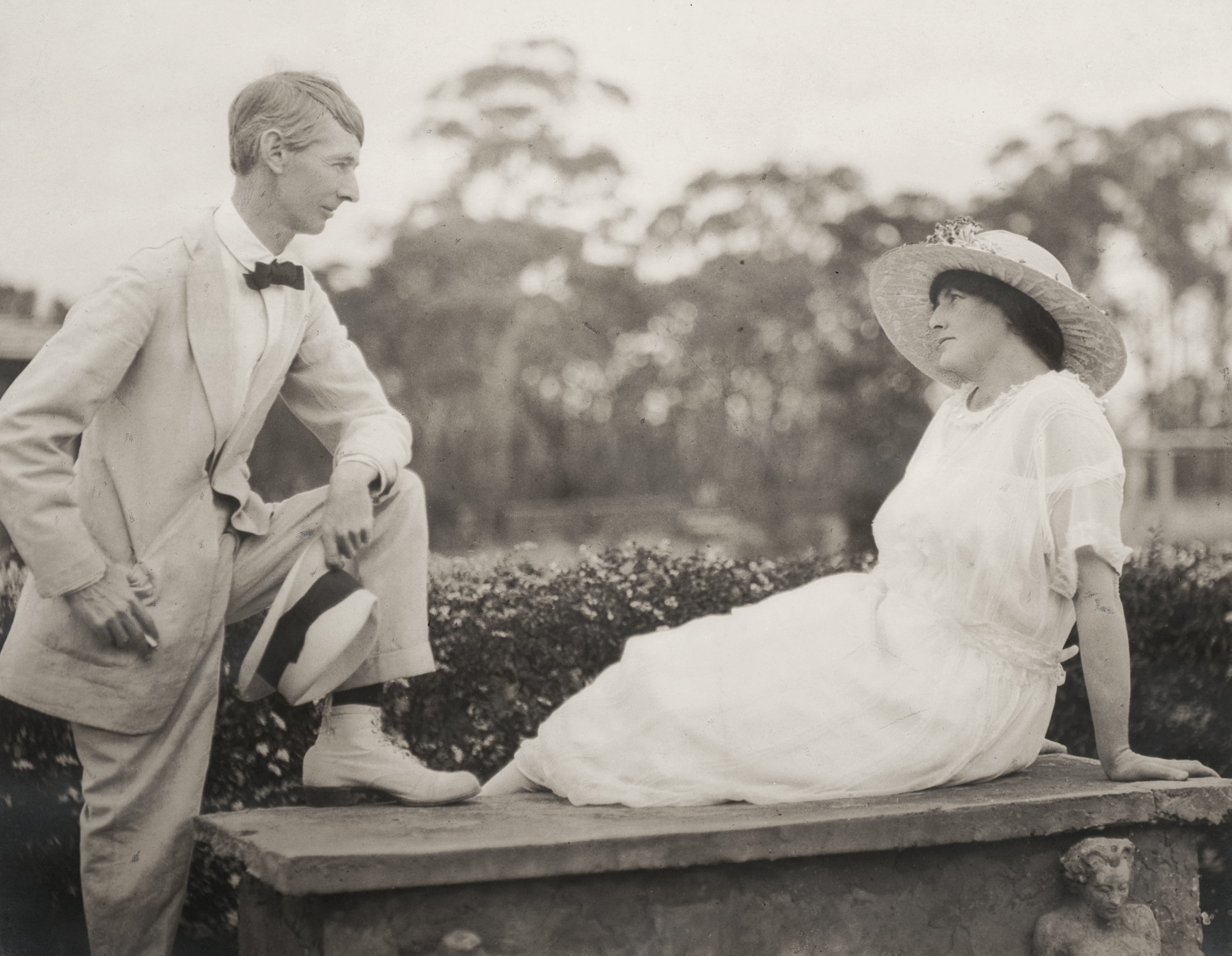
Rose and Norman Lindsay, Springwood, Sydney, ca. 1920

Norman Lindsay came relatively late to etching. He was initially taught by Sydney Ure Smith, but advanced his technique under the guidance of Lionel, who even developed a special varnish to work well with Norman's deeply bit fine lines. Norman lacked the patience to print out editions, so Lionel taught Rose how to become a master printer.

The bitter quarrel which ended the friendship between Norman and Lionel Lindsay began when Lionel discovered that Norman had incorporated passages from Lionel's adolescent diary into the novel that became Redheap. When the book was eventually published in 1930, it was banned in Australia. The characters in the book are based both on members of the Lindsay family and some of their closest friends.

Many of Norman Lindsay paintings, drawings and etchings are based on images of voluptuous women and mythological creatures. His novels are closer to the realities of his life.

In 1938, Lindsay published Age of Consent, which described the experience of a middle-aged painter on a trip to a rural area, who meets an adolescent girl who serves as his model, and then lover. The book, published in Britain, was banned in Australia until 1962.

Coincidentally, in the early 1930s, Norman Lindsay left Rose in Springwood for a number of years and moved to Bridge Street in Sydney, when he established a relationship with the very young art student, Margaret Coen.

The Crucified Venus, 1912, the subject of a 1913 controversy at the Society of Artists exhibition in Melbourne.

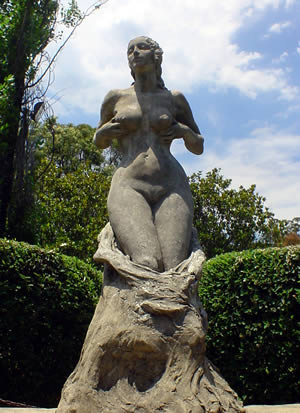
Statue of a nude at the Norman Lindsay gardens

Lindsay was a prolific artist, producing a vast body of work in different media, including pen drawing, etching, watercolour, oil and sculptures in concrete and bronze. Lindsay's creative output was vast, his energy enormous. Several eyewitness accounts tell of his working practices in the 1920s. He woke early and produced a watercolour before breakfast. By mid-morning, he would be in his etching studio where he worked until late afternoon. In the afternoon, he would work on a concrete sculpture in the garden. In the evening, he would write a new chapter for whatever novel he was working on at the time.

As a break, some days he worked on a model ship. He was highly inventive, melting down the lead casings of oil paint tubes to use for the figures on his model ships, made a large easel using a door, carved and decorated furniture, designed and built chairs, created garden planters, Roman columns and built his own additions to the Faulconbridge property.

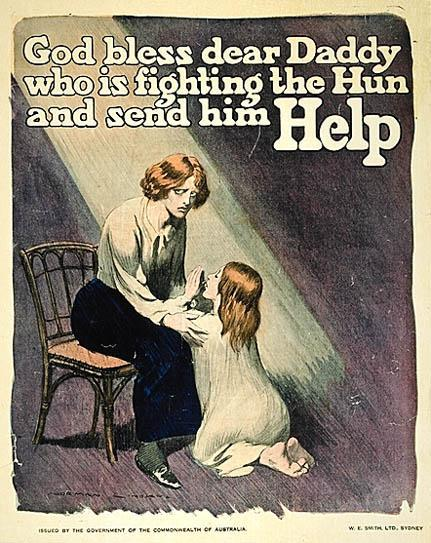
Cartoons such as this one, by Lindsay, were used both for recruitment and to promote conscription during World War I.

Lindsay's editorial cartoons were notable for often illustrating the racist and right-wing political leanings that dominated The Bulletin in the first half of the 20th century. The "Red Menace" and "Yellow Peril" were popular themes in his cartoons. These attitudes occasionally spilled over into his other work, and modern editions of The Magic Pudding often omit one couplet in which "you unmitigated Jew" is used as an insult.

His commercial work included the cover for the seminal Henry Lawson book, While the Billy Boils.

Lindsay influenced numerous artists, notably the illustrators Roy Krenkel and Frank Frazetta.

== Reception ==
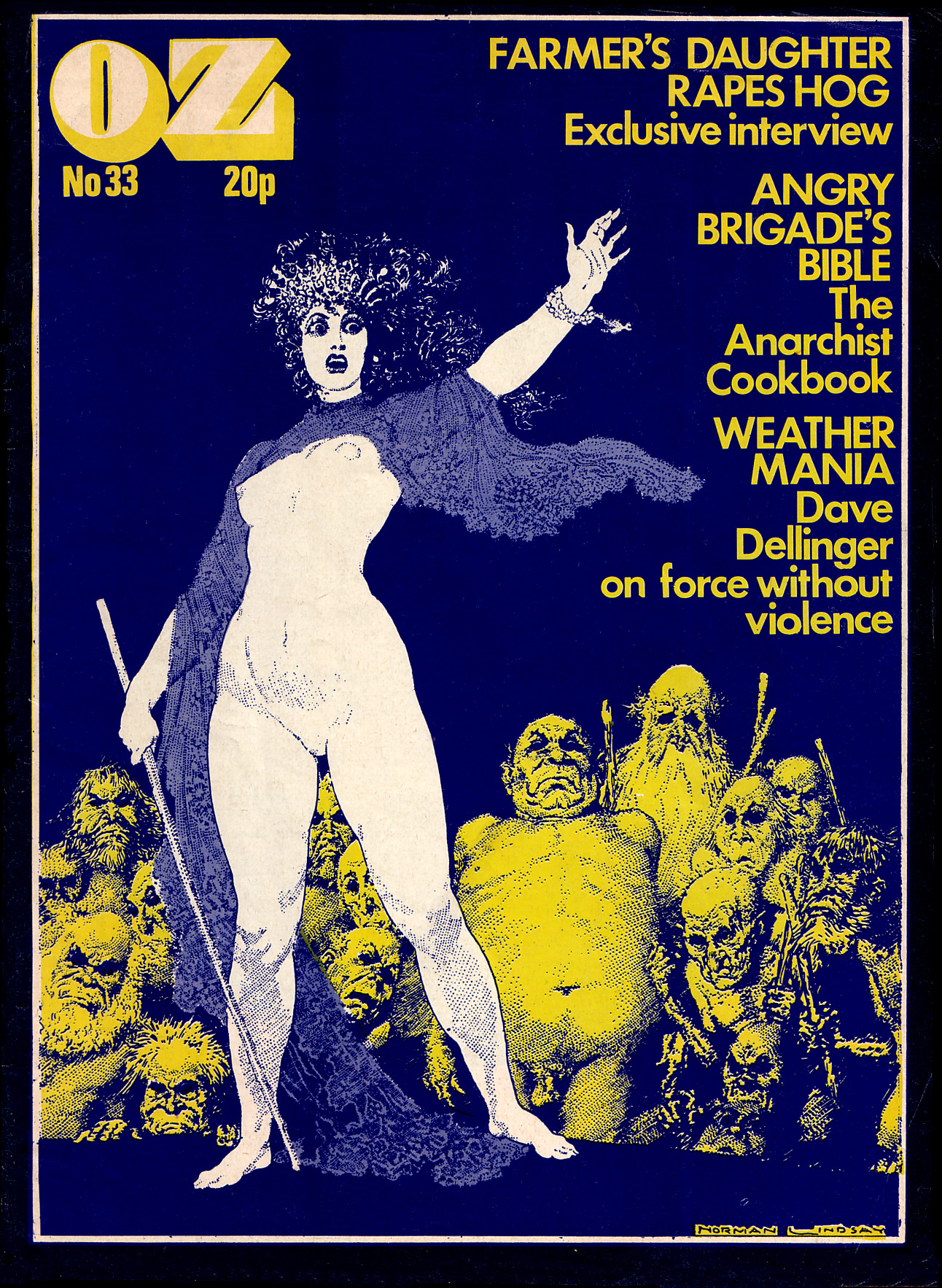
Oz (magazine) London, No.33, February 1971. Cover image by Norman Lindsay

Early in his career, Norman Lindsay's art was widely praised for the quality of his drawn line, and the sweet sensuality of his subjects. His most controversial early drawing, Pollice Verso (1904) was bought by the National Gallery of Victoria for the then record price of 157 guineas and ten shillings.

Despite his local fame, Norman Lindsay was less successful internationally. In 1923 his work was included in an exhibition of Australian art held at the Royal Academy in London.. While the exhibition as a whole received favourable reviews, William Orpen, an artist Lindsay admired, was scathing about his work. His critique in the London Daily Express was republished in Australia in The Barrier Miner: "The Australian art exhibition is good, and shows great promise for a young nation; but please ignore its black spot, Norman Lindsay. His work has no sign of art, no technique, nothing. Ignore it."

As with many provincial artists of his generation, Norman Lindsay was hostile to modern art, and modern artists returned the compliment.

Tastes change with time. In the late 1940s, Norman Lindsay offered a large representative collection of his work as a gift to the Art Gallery of NSW. The Gallery, which by then was collecting the work of modern artists such as Sidney Nolan, was reluctant to accept the gift. The offer was eventually withdrawn. He was increasinlgly seen as an historic figure, an artist from the past. He was eventually able to bequeath his house and a significant collection of art to the National Trust of Australia. Shortly before he died, Norman Lindsay also donated a large collection of his work to the University of Melbourne.

Norman Lindsay's house has become a popular tourist destination and was the location for the 1994 film Sirens, starring Sam Neill as Lindsay.

The differing views on Norman Lindsay's art tend to reflect the age and prejudiced of those who have written on him. In 1969, after Lindsay died, the modernist Australian art critic Alan McCulloch called Norman Lindsay's figures "galumphing".

Poets of the same generation were more sympathetic. A.D. Hope in a book of Lindsay pencil drawings wrote that: "These are faithful and loving studies of the model in which the breasts and thighs are as individual and eloquent as the faces, and every part of the body thinks, feels and speaks."

The art critic John McDonald,wrote:

One need not doubt his sincerity, no matter how foolish his pagan affectations look nowadays. It is more to be marvelled at that Lindsay's leering satyrs, pneumatic nymphs, and musclebound he-men were so long believed to be the apogee of Australian artistic achievement...

In the 1960s, Norman Lindsay's art began to be reassessed by a new generation. The artists and writers of Oz magazine appreciated the frank sexuality of his drawing, as well as his technical expertise. The production of facsimile etchings, made with the approval of his family, led to an increased appreciation of his graphic work, which in turn led to a lively market for Norman Lindsay’s art.

In 1995 the Art Gallery of New South Wales presented a major exhibition, The Legendary Lindsays, which also travelled to Ballarat. This placed Norman Lindsay's work in the context of both his family and the generation of Australian artists of the years around Federation.

== Personal life ==
Lindsay married Catherine (Kate) Agatha Parkinson, in Melbourne on 23 May 1900. Their son Jack was born in Melbourne on 20 October 1900, followed by Raymond and Philip in 1906. They divorced in 1918. He later married Rose Soady who was also his business manager, a most recognisable model, and the printer for most of his etchings.

They had two daughters: Jane Lindsay, born in 1920, and Helen Lindsay, born in 1921. Philip died in 1958 and Raymond in 1960. In the Lindsay tradition, Jack became a prolific publisher, writer, translator and activist. Philip became a writer of historical novels, and worked for the film industry.

== Death ==
Lindsay is buried in Springwood Cemetery in Springwood, close to Faulconbridge where he lived.

== Legacy ==
Norman Lindsay's work is held in many Australian public collections. These include the Art Gallery of NSW, Queensland Art Gallery and Gallery of Modern Art, National Gallery of Australia, National Gallery of Victoria, Art Gallery of South Australia, Art Gallery of Western Australia, and Art Gallery of Ballarat as well as the State Library of NSW, Fisher Library (University of Sydney) and the University of Melbourne. A large body of his work is housed in his former home at Faulconbridge, New South Wales, now the Norman Lindsay Gallery and Museum, and many works reside in private and corporate collections.

His children's book, The Magic Pudding, remains in print.

== Oral history ==
Lindsay was interviewed in 1965 by Keith Adam, where Lindsay goes into detail about his art and work, his influences and inspirations, the reasons for writing and hobbies that he pursued. This recording can be found at the National Library of Australia.

== Fictional portrayals ==
=== Film ===
The first major screen adaptation of Lindsay's literary works was the 1953 British film Our Girl Friday, based on his 1934 novel The Cautious Amorist. The 1969 Australian-British co-production Age of Consent, adapted from Lindsay's 1938 novel of the same name, was the last full-length feature film directed by Michael Powell (Note: The Boy Who Turned Yellow (1972) was made after this and is a bit too long at 55 minutes to be considered a short film, but is shorter than most feature films.), and starred James Mason and Helen Mirren in her first credited movie role.

In 1994, Sam Neill played a fictionalised version of Lindsay in John Duigan's Sirens, set and filmed primarily at Lindsay's Faulconbridge home. The film is also notable as the movie debut of Australian supermodel Elle Macpherson.

=== Television ===
In 1972 five novels were adapted for TV as part of the Australian Broadcasting Corporation's Norman Lindsay festival. These were Halfway to Anywhere (adapted by Cliff Green), Redheap (adapted by Eleanor Witcombe), A Curate in Bohemia (adapted by Michael Boddy), The Cousin from Fiji (adapted by Barbara Vernon) and Dust or Polish (adapted by Peter Kenna).

Searches of the ABC's TARA Online television database, and the collection database of the National Film & Sound Archive conducted in March 2009, failed to return any results for these programs. Regrettably, many videotaped ABC programs, series such as Certain Women and program segments from the late 1960s and early 1970s, were subsequently erased as part of an ill-considered economy drive.

Although the closure of ABC Sydney's Gore Hill studio, uncovered considerable quantities of film and video footage long thought to have been lost, such as the complete The Aunty Jack Show, the absence of any reference on the TARA or NFSA databases and the paucity of citations elsewhere, e.g. IMDb, suggest that the master recordings of the adaptations of the Norman Lindsay novels may no longer exist. The first broadcasts of these programs predated widespread domestic ownership of videocassette recorders in Australia, so it is unlikely that any domestically recorded off-air copies exist either.

== Works ==
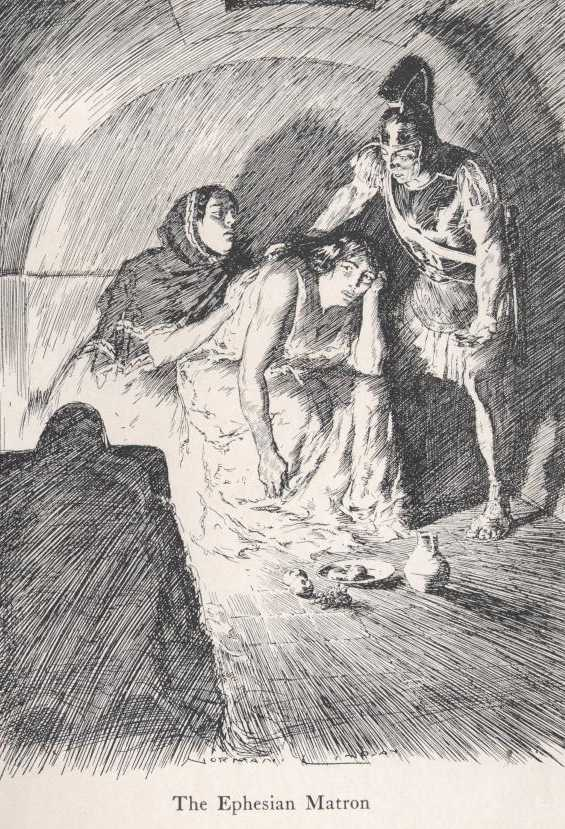
Illustration by Norman Lindsay for the "Ephesian Matron" episode in the Satyricon

=== Novels ===
- A Curate in Bohemia (1913)
- Redheap (1930) (published in the U.S. as Every Mother's Son)
- Miracles by Arrangement (1932) (published in the U.S. as Mr. Gresham and Olympus)
- Saturdee (1933)
- Pan in the Parlour (1933)
- The Cautious Amorist (1934) (first published in the U.S. in 1932); movie version: Our Girl Friday 1953
- Age of Consent (1938); movie version: Age of Consent 1969
- The Cousin from Fiji (1945)
- Halfway to Anywhere (1947)
- Dust or Polish? (1950)
- Rooms and Houses (1968)

=== Children's books ===
- The Magic Pudding (1918)
- The Flyaway Highway (1936)

=== Poetry book ===
- illustrations in Francis Webb, A Drum for Ben Boyd, Sydney: Angus & Robertson, (1948)

=== Other ===
- Lysistrata, verse translation by Jack Lindsay, illustrated by Norman Lindsday Sydney : Fanfrolico Press, (1925)
- The Etchings of Norman Lindsay, London: Constable & Co, (1927)
- Hyperborea: Two Fantastic Travel Essays, London: Fanfrolico Press, (1928)
- Madam Life's Lovers: A Human Narrative Embodying a Philosophy of the Artist in Dialogue Form London, Fanfrolico Press (1929)
- The Scribblings of an Idle Mind, Lansdowne, Melbourne (1956)
- Norman Lindsay: Pencil Drawings, Angus & Robertson, Sydney (1969)
- Norman Lindsay's Pen Drawings, Angus & Robertson, Sydney (1974)
- R.G. Howarth & A.W. Barker (eds) The Letters of Norman Lindsay, Angus & Robertson, Sydney (1979)

=== Autobiographical ===
- Bohemians of the Bulletin, Angus & Robertson, Sydney (1965)
- My Mask: For what little I know of the man behind it, an autobiography, Angus & Robertson, Sydney (1970) (Written in 1957 with instructions to be published after his death)

=== Books about Norman Lindsay ===
- John Hetherington, Norman Lindsay, Melbourne: Lansdowne Press, (1961)
- Rose Lindsay, Model Wife: My Life with Norman Lindsay, Sydney: Ure Smith, (1967)
- John Hetherington, Norman Lindsay: The Embattled Olympian, Melbourne: Oxford University Press, (1973)
- Jane Lindsay, A Portrait of Pa, Sydney: Angus & Robertson, (1975)
- Douglas Stewart, Norman Lindsay: A Personal Memoir, (1975)
- Lin Bloomfield, Norman Lindsay: Impulse to draw, Sydney:Bay Books,(1984)
- Lionel Lindsay: An artist and his family, London: Chatto & Windus, (1988)
- The Legendary Lindsays, Sydney, Art Gallery of NSW, (1995)
- Joanna Mendelssohn, Letters & Liars: Norman Lindsay and the Lindsay Family, Sydney: Angus & Robertson, (1996)

== See also ==
- Kenneth G. Ross: author of the musical play Norman Lindsay and his Push in Bohemia (1978)
- Norman Lindsay Gallery and Museum
- Margaret Coen
