= Aircraft in fiction =

Fictional depictions of aircraft

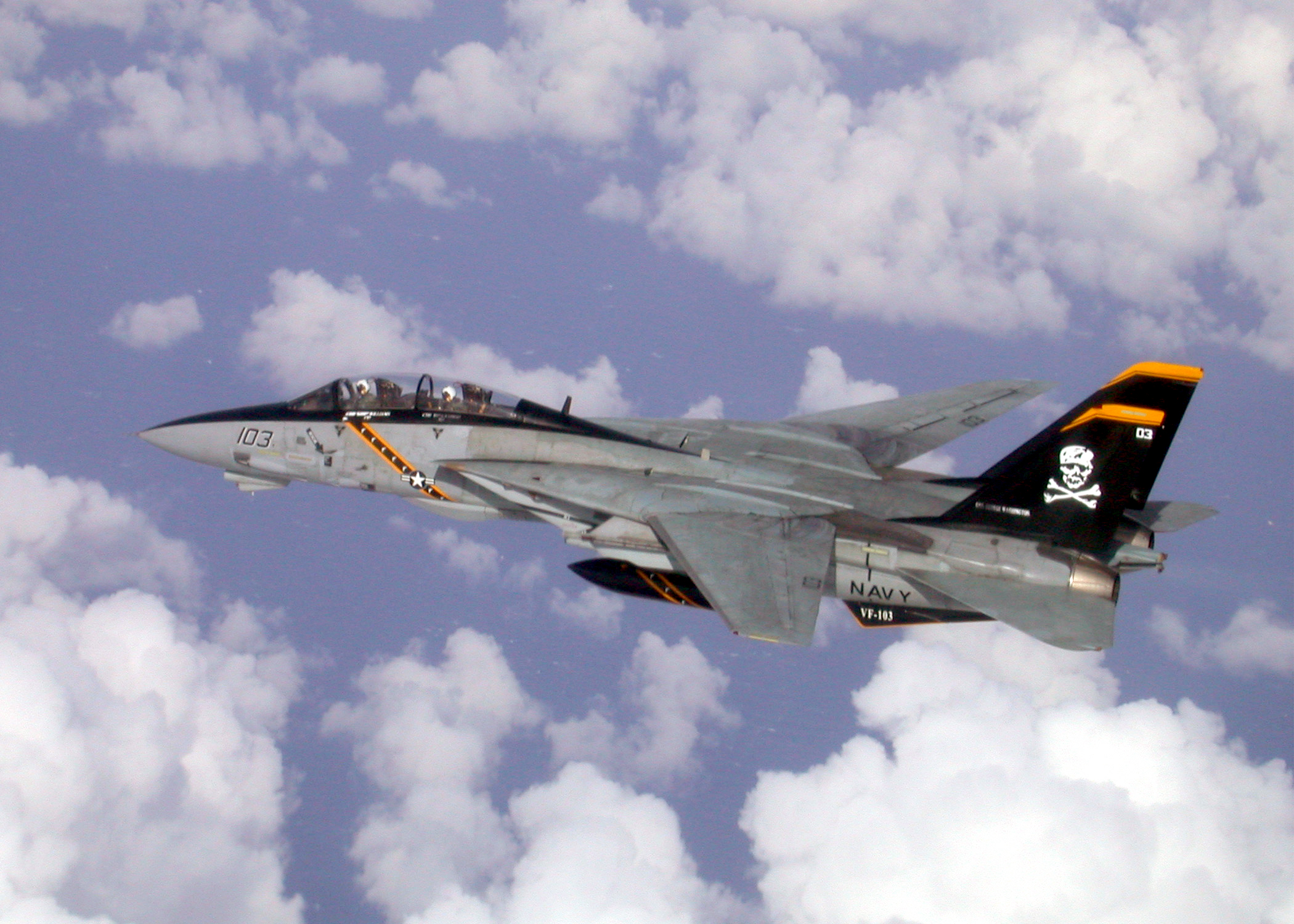
Real military aircraft, such as this Grumman F-14 Tomcat, frequently appear in works of fiction.

Various real-world aircraft have long made significant appearances in fictional works, including books, films, toys, TV programs, video games, and other media.

== History ==
The first aviation film was the 1911 William J. Humphrey–directed two-reeler, The Military Air-Scout, shot after an Aero Club of America flying meet at Long Island, New York. The stunt flying was done by Lt. Henry H. Arnold, "who picked up 'a few extra bucks' for his services" and "became so excited about movies that he almost quit the Army to become an actor."

The years between World War I and World War II saw extensive use of aircraft, a new technology, in film, a new medium. In the early 1920s, Hollywood studios made dozens of now-obscure "aerial Westerns" with leads such as Tom Mix and Hoot Gibson, where the role of the horse was taken by aircraft, or used aircraft as nothing more than vehicles for stunts to excite audiences. In 1926, the first "proper" aviation film was made; Wings is a story of two pilots who sign up to fly and fight in the First World War. Made with the cooperation of the United States' then-Department of War (a relationship that continues to this day), it used front-line military aircraft of the day such as the Thomas-Morse MB-3 and Boeing PW-9, flown by military pilots. Future U.S. Air Force generals Hap Arnold and Hoyt Vandenberg were among the military officers involved with the production: Arnold as a technical consultant and Vandenberg as one of the pilots. Wings was a box-office hit when it achieved general release in 1929 and went on to win the award for Best Production at the first Academy Awards.

In Fascist Italy in the 1930s, aviation-themed films were used as propaganda tools to complement the massed flights led by Italo Balbo in promoting the regime domestically and abroad. One such film was the most successful Italian film of the pre-World War II era; Luciano Serra pilota (Luciano Serra, Pilot) was inextricably linked to the Fascist government via Mussolini's son Vittorio, who was the driving force behind the film's production. The film, set between 1921 and the Italo-Abyssinian War, was used to compare the allegedly moribund state of aviation in pre-Fascist Italy with the purported power of the Regia Aeronautica and Italian aviation in general in the 1930s. However, by the time that Luciano Serra pilota was shown at the 1938 Venice Film Festival, the link between aviation and Fascism had already been firmly established in the minds of the Italian people through widespread depictions of aircraft in a variety of media. For example, there was an entire branch of the Futurist Art movement devoted to aviation, known as Aeropittura ("Aeropainting"). While many of the Aeropittura works were devoted to flight rather than aircraft per se, some did celebrate Italian aviation exploits, such as Alfredo Ambrosi's Il volo su Vienna (The Flight over Vienna) which depicted in Futurist style the World War I exploit of Gabriele d'Annunzio; although the city of Vienna is shown in abstract in accordance with the aims of Aeropittura – namely to show the dynamism and excitement of flight – the Ansaldo SVA aircraft are carefully and accurately rendered.

The U.S. military controls whether its aircraft may be used for movie or video production. Requests for such use must be accompanied by the proposed production's script, allowing military officials to withhold aircraft when they believe the work will not portray the U.S. military in a sufficiently positive light. Because alternatives to using real military aircraft can be expensive, films that do not get U.S. military approval often do not get financed or made. Sean McElwee, writing for Salon.com, concluded of this problem,

This is a prima facie case for de facto censorship...If the government wants to allow its equipment to be used by studios, it needs to grant access to anyone who wants to use it – that is the meaning of pluralism. The Pentagon fears that some of the movies may hurt the military's reputation and recruiting efforts. These concerns are legitimate, but it's more important that we allow John Stuart Mill's 'market place of ideas' to be a place for free trade, rather than favoring some over others.

Aircraft have also appeared in television miniseries and series around the world. These include the American productions Twelve O'Clock High, Airwolf, Baa Baa Black Sheep, Sky King and Wings; the Australian series Big Sky, Chopper Squad and The Flying Doctors, and the miniseries The Lancaster Miller Affair; British shows such as Airline, Piece of Cake and Squadron, the Canadian series Arctic Air; JETS – Leben am Limit and Medicopter 117 – Jedes Leben zählt from Germany; and the Canadian–British–German co-production Ritter's Cove.

== A ==
=== A-6 Intruder ===
The 1986 Stephen Coonts novel Flight of the Intruder is about two naval aviators who take their Grumman A-6 Intruder on an unauthorized bombing raid on Hanoi during the Vietnam War. It was made into a 1991 film of the same name.

=== A-10 Thunderbolt II ===
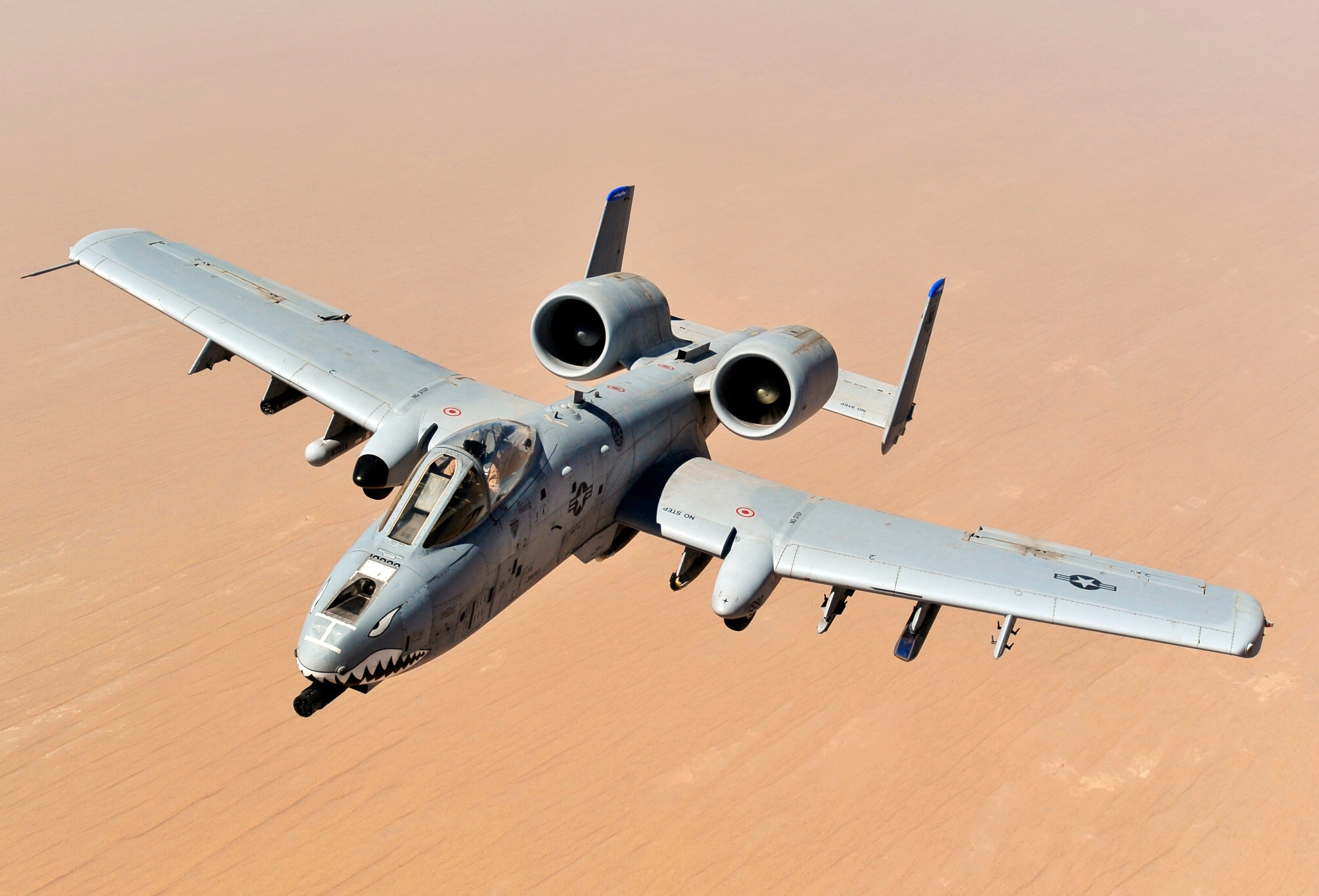
A-10 Thunderbolt II

The A-10 Thunderbolt II is featured in the 1989 video game A-10 Tank Killer.

=== A-26/B-26 Invader ===
Two A-26 firebombers were featured in the 1989 Steven Spielberg film Always. Attempts to use radio-controlled models for special effects shots were abandoned as unworkable; instead, models were "flown" from wire rigs.

=== A6M Zero ===
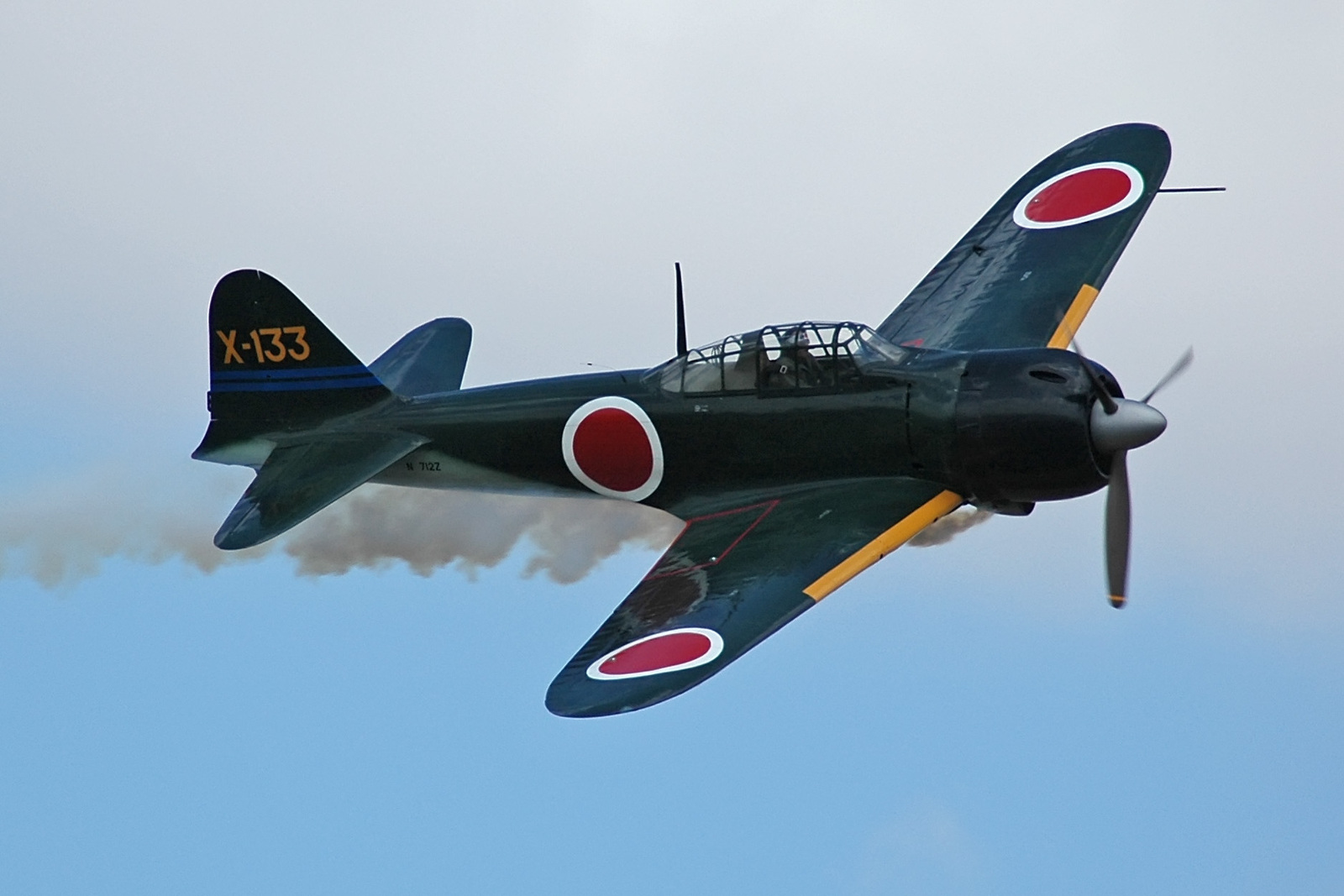
Mitsubishi A6M Zero

The Mitsubishi A6M Zero was featured in the film The Wind Rises, a 2013 Studio Ghibli animated fictionalized biopic of Zero designer Jiro Horikoshi.

Zero fighters are shown in the 2013 Japanese novel Eien No Zero (The Eternal Zero) by Naoki Hyakuta, which was made into a 2013 film of the same name directed by Takashi Yamazaki.

=== Aérospatiale Gazelle ===
A heavily modified Aérospatiale Gazelle was the centerpiece of the 1983 John Badham action film Blue Thunder. The same helicopter appeared in the short-lived 1984 TV series by the same name starring James Farentino. The modified Gazelle went on to be used in the TV mini-series Amerika.

=== AgustaWestland AW101 ===
At the climax of the 2012 James Bond film Skyfall, an armed AgustaWestland AW101 Merlin transport helicopter is used in the main villain Silva's assault on Bond and M at Bond's childhood home.

=== AH-64 Apache ===
The Boeing AH-64 Apache had a major role in the 1990 action-thriller film directed by David Green, Fire Birds (or Wings of the Apache).

The Apache helicopter has also made an appearance in the hardcore study-level sim DCS: World, being praised for its accurate depiction of the systems and procedures.

=== Airspeed Horsa ===
The assault on what would later be known as the Pegasus Bridge over the Caen Canal in France by British commandos landing in Airspeed Horsa gliders was depicted in the 1962 war epic The Longest Day. Only one Horsa replica was actually constructed.

Ten non-flyable Airspeed Horsa mockups were fabricated for the filming of the 1977 film A Bridge Too Far.

=== American Eagle A-1 ===
At least two American Eagle A-1s were employed in the production of the 1930 film Young Eagles which was directed by William A. Wellman and starred Buddy Rogers and Jean Arthur. The film portrayed American pilots serving in France during the Great War. Although the A-1 was a post-WW1 trainer, the filmmakers considered it suitable to portray wartime aircraft. One Eagle was painted with USAS insignia while a second was painted with German markings. Stunt pilot Dick Grace was hired to deliberately crash-land both of them in separate scenes, which severely damaged both aircraft. Grace escaped injury on both occasions.

=== Avro Ashton ===
An Avro Ashton, in its six-engined, Olympus testbed form, appeared as the fictitious Phoenix airliner in Cone of Silence (1960), based on the novel of the same name by David Beaty, a former BOAC pilot. This concerned the takeoff problems of the Phoenix, and the subsequent accident investigation; it was based on two takeoff accidents to the de Havilland Comet.

=== Avro Canada CF-105 Arrow ===
The Avro Canada CF-105 Arrow makes a prominent appearance in Daniel Wyatt's 1990 novel, The Last Flight of the Arrow. In the novel, the real-life destruction of the fighter is a cover for a secret U.S.-Canadian continental air-defense initiative that fields a fleet of Arrows. A Polish-Canadian Royal Canadian Air Force pilot flies one Arrow on a high-speed reconnaissance flight over Russia to find proof that the Soviet Union is planning an airstrike on North America.

=== Avro Lancaster ===
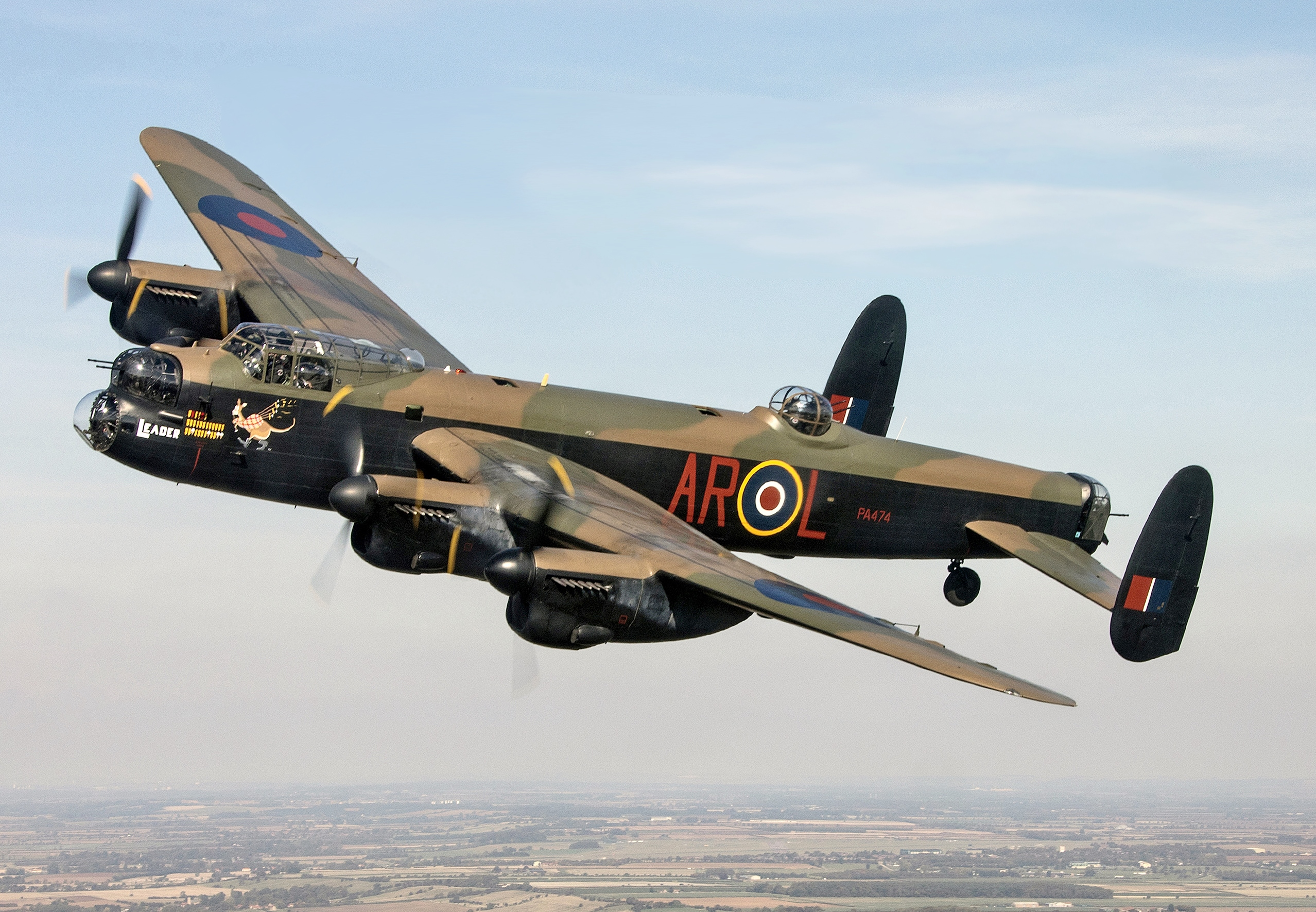
Avro Lancaster

The Avro Lancaster was the best-known Royal Air Force heavy bomber of World War II.

Lancasters appeared in the 1952 British war film Appointment in London (released in the US as Raiders in the Sky) directed by Philip Leacock and starring Dirk Bogarde.

=== Avro Vulcan ===
Avro Vulcans are central to the 2008 aviation novel by English author Derek Robinson, titled Hullo Russia, Goodbye England. A British RAF pilot named Silk, a veteran of Bomber Command in the Second World War, rejoins the service at the height of the Cold War.

The 1965 James Bond film Thunderball portrays the hijacking of an Avro Vulcan for its nuclear bombs.

== B ==
=== B-17 Flying Fortress ===
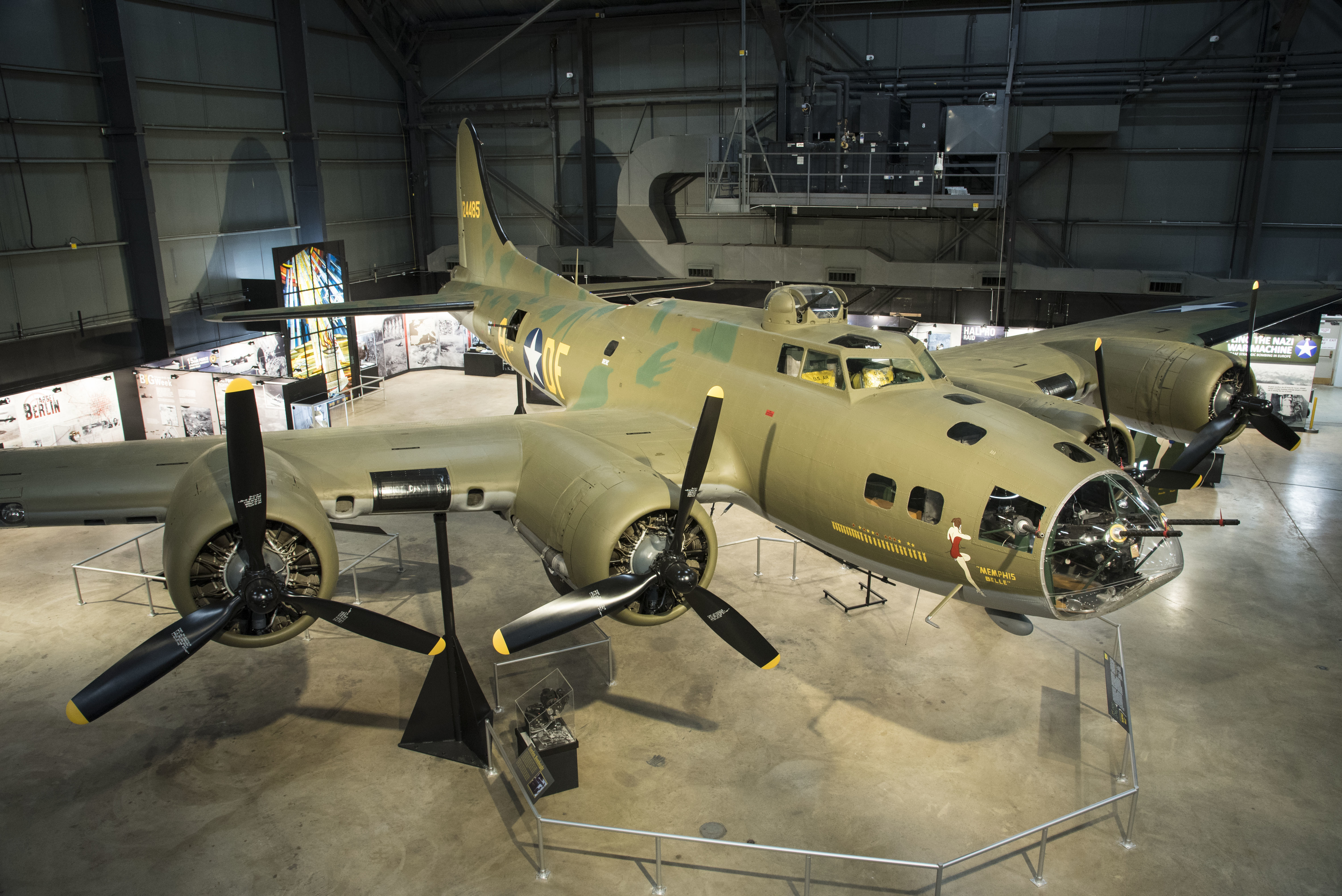
Boeing B-17 Flying Fortress

Boeing B-17 Flying Fortresses appear in the 1951 novel The Sun is Silent by Saul Levitt which traces the journey of a B-17 crew from their training through to daylight bombing missions over Germany. The author himself had served as a radioman/gunner in a B-17 during the war.

The B-17 Flying Fortress was the subject of the 1990 Warner Bros. film Memphis Belle. During filming, one of the five vintage B-17s was destroyed in an accidental crash and a second was damaged when an engine cowling detached in flight, tearing a chunk out of the aircraft's tail. There were no injuries in either incident.

For George Lucas' 2012 film Red Tails about the 332d Fighter Group, the Tuskegee Airmen, the B-17G "Pink Lady" operated by the Association Forteresse Toujours Volante, appeared as a 351st Bomb Group aircraft named "Yankee", coded ED-N. Filmed in the Czech Republic in 2010, the film company funding allowed the warbird to fly for an additional year before being retired to museum status. Other Flying Fortresses were rendered through CGI.

=== B-24 Liberator ===
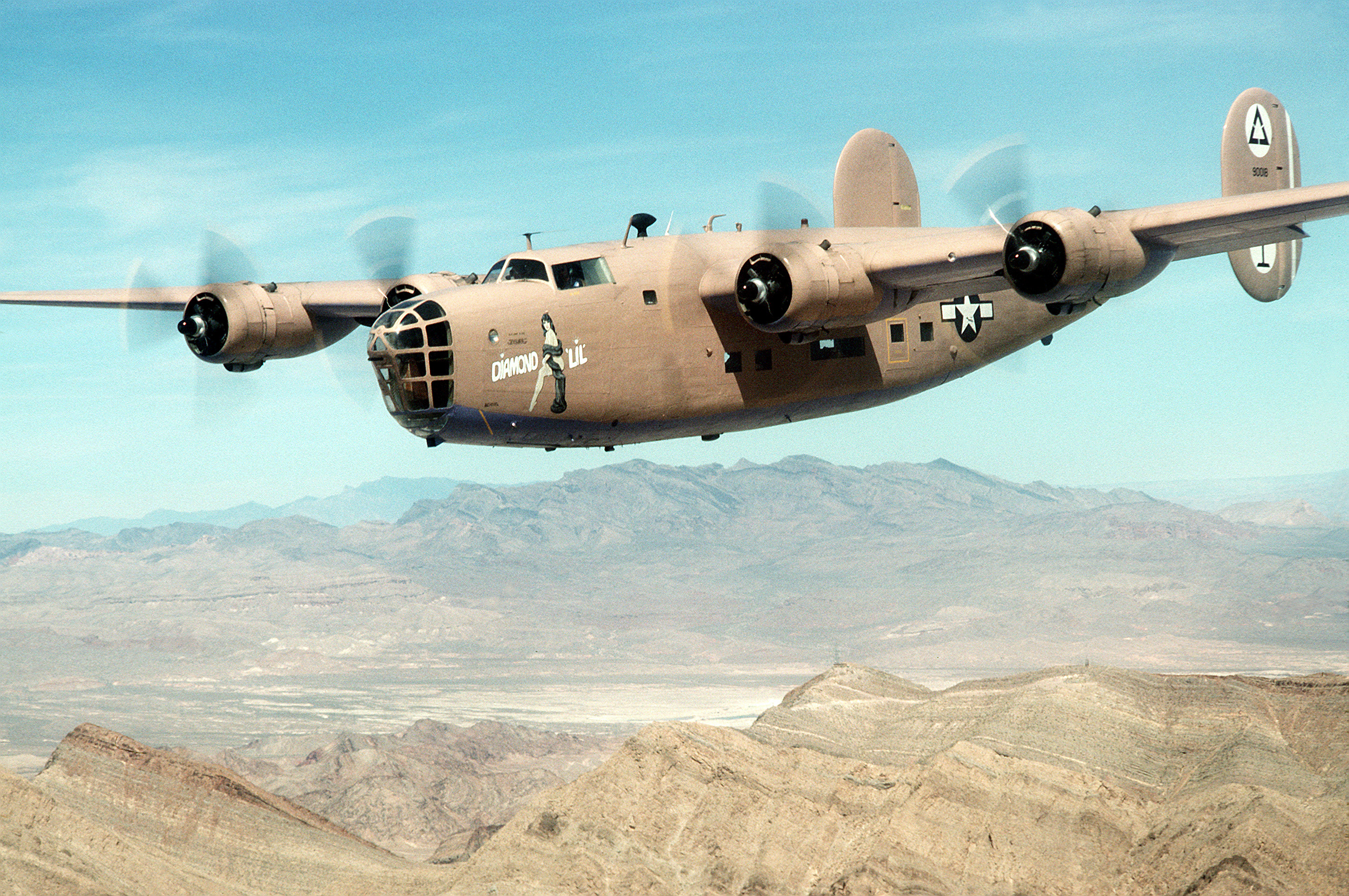
Consolidated B-24 Liberator

Consolidated B-24 Liberators appear in the 1944 20th Century Fox film Winged Victory which was directed by George Cukor and which portrayed cadets undergoing training as aircrew in the U.S. Army Air Forces during WW2. The AAF detached several B-24s to the production, which was filmed at Santa Ana Army Airfield in California.

B-24s are a central feature in the 1952 novel Angle of Attack by Joseph Landon. The story concerns navigator Irwin 'Win' Hellman, whose B-24 is attacked by enemy fighters and badly damaged over Vienna. The B-24's pilot signals to the enemy fliers that he wishes to surrender but Hellman, who is Jewish and dreads being captured alive, believes they can still escape and, with the backing of the other crew, he takes command.

B-24s are a major feature of the 1979 novel Rider on the Wind by David Westheimer. The novel portrays a B-24 pilot of the USAAF stationed in Palestine during the Second World War and who meets a Jewish resistance-fighter. The author himself served as a navigator in a B-24 with the 98th Bomb Group stationed in Palestine and Egypt in 1942.

=== B-25 Mitchell ===
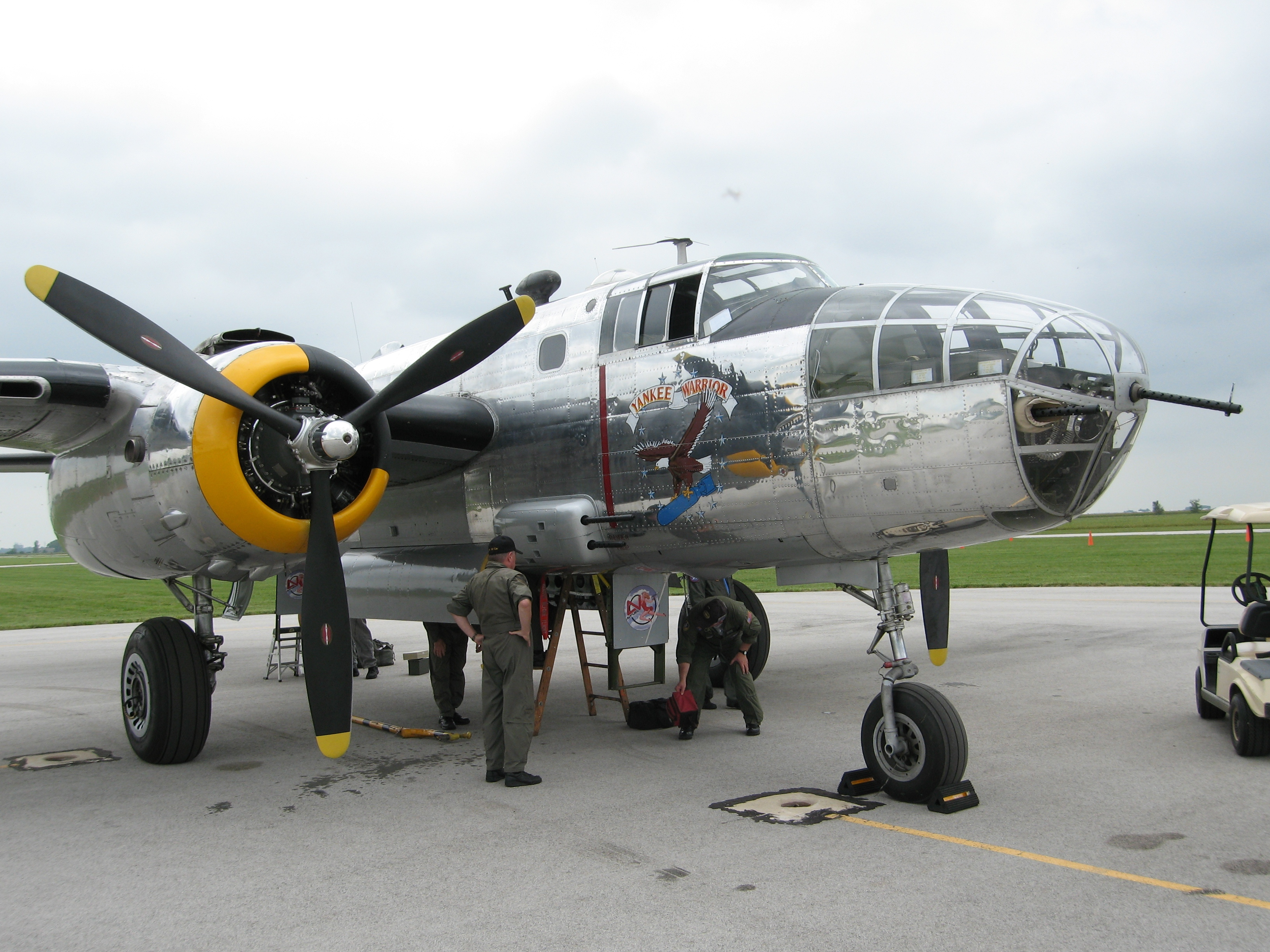
North American B-25 Mitchell

The North American B-25 Mitchell had feature roles in the films Thirty Seconds over Tokyo (1944) (pilot Ted Lawson's account of the Doolittle Raid), Hanover Street (1979) (based on a fictional B-25 unit stationed in England), and Forever Young (1992), which follows a B-25 test pilot's story both in the past and present.

B-25s appear in the 1976 novel Whip by Martin Caidin, which portrays a B-25 unit based in Australia and commanded by Captain 'Whip' Russell and they are employed in low-level bombing missions against Japanese convoys carrying reinforcements to Guadalcanal and Rabaul in 1942.

The B-25 was the focus of the second half of the 2001 film Pearl Harbor, although critics complained that the bomber and its role were being depicted inaccurately.

B-25s also appear in the 2019 Hulu mini-series Catch-22 directed by George Clooney. Two vintage B-25s were used in the production and others were re-created with CGI.

=== B-29 Superfortress ===
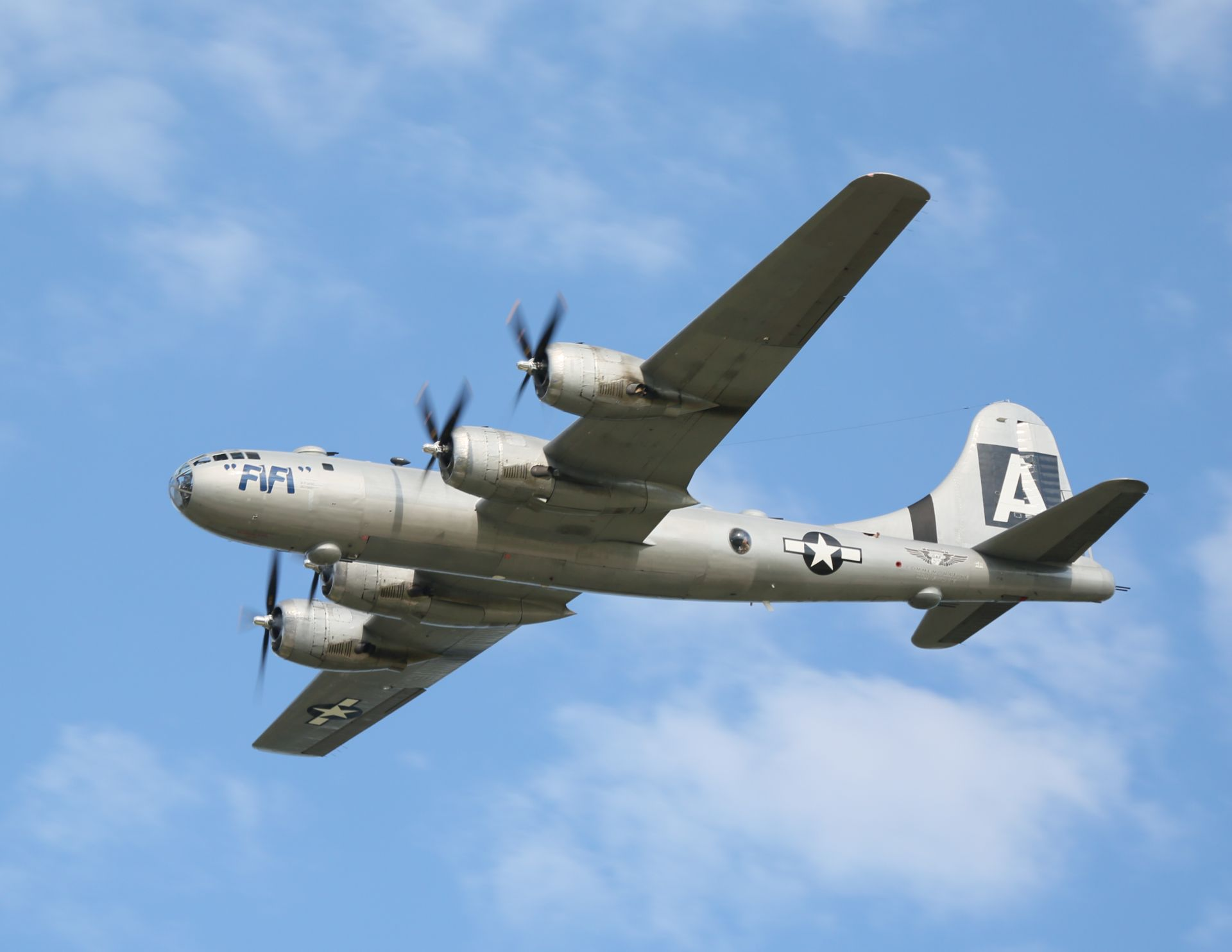
Boeing B-29 Superfortress

The Boeing B-29 Superfortress has played an important role in several Hollywood films, particularly the Enola Gay, which dropped the first atomic bomb. The Enola Gay was depicted in Above and Beyond and The Beginning or the End.

=== B-52 Stratofortress ===
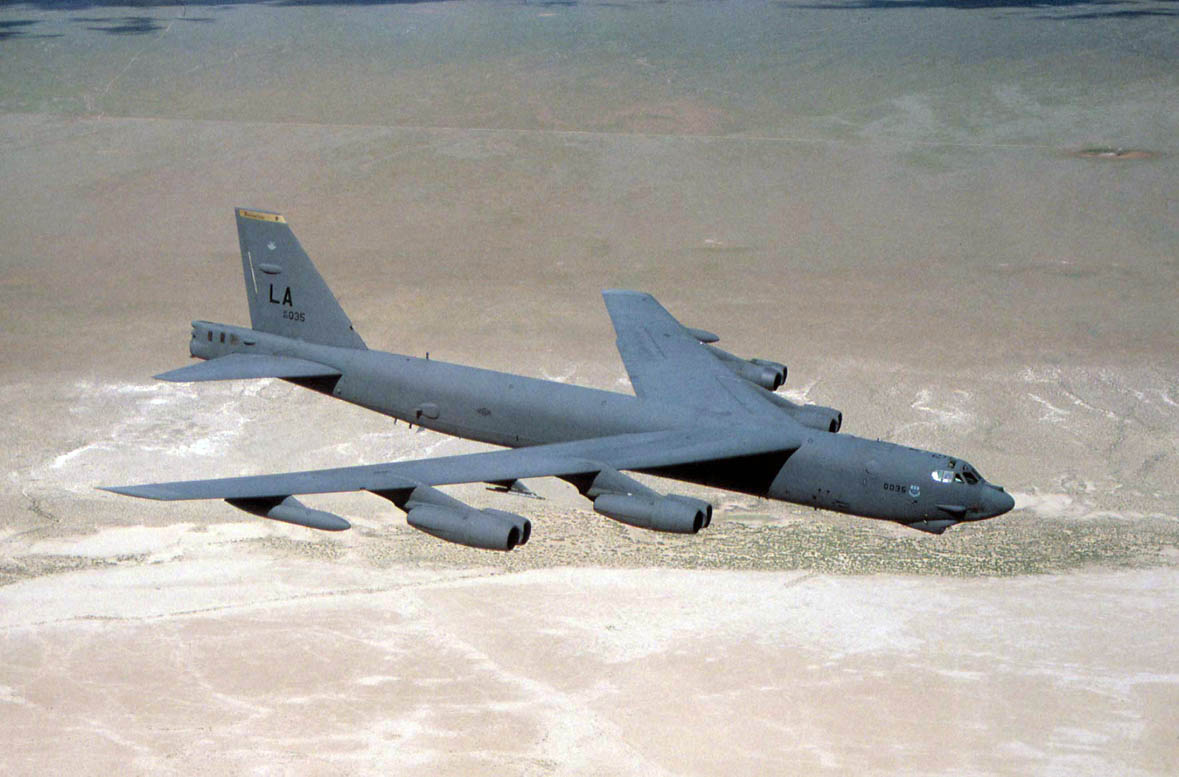
Boeing B-52 Stratofortress

The 1957 film Bombers B-52 focused on the introduction of the Boeing B-52 Stratofortress bomber by the U.S. Strategic Air Command (SAC) in the 1950s, using extensive footage of early model B-52s.

The 1963 film A Gathering of Eagles focuses on the stresses of a B-52 wing commander at the height of the Cold War. Some excellent visuals of the B-52 including a complex inflight refueling operation which nearly ends in disaster.

The B-52 was also a key part of Stanley Kubrick's 1964 black comedy film Dr. Strangelove or: How I Learned to Stop Worrying and Love the Bomb.

A B-52 was a focal point of the 1983 novel Trinity's Child, by William Prochnau, and the 1990 telemovie adaptation, By Dawn's Early Light.

=== Bell 47 ===
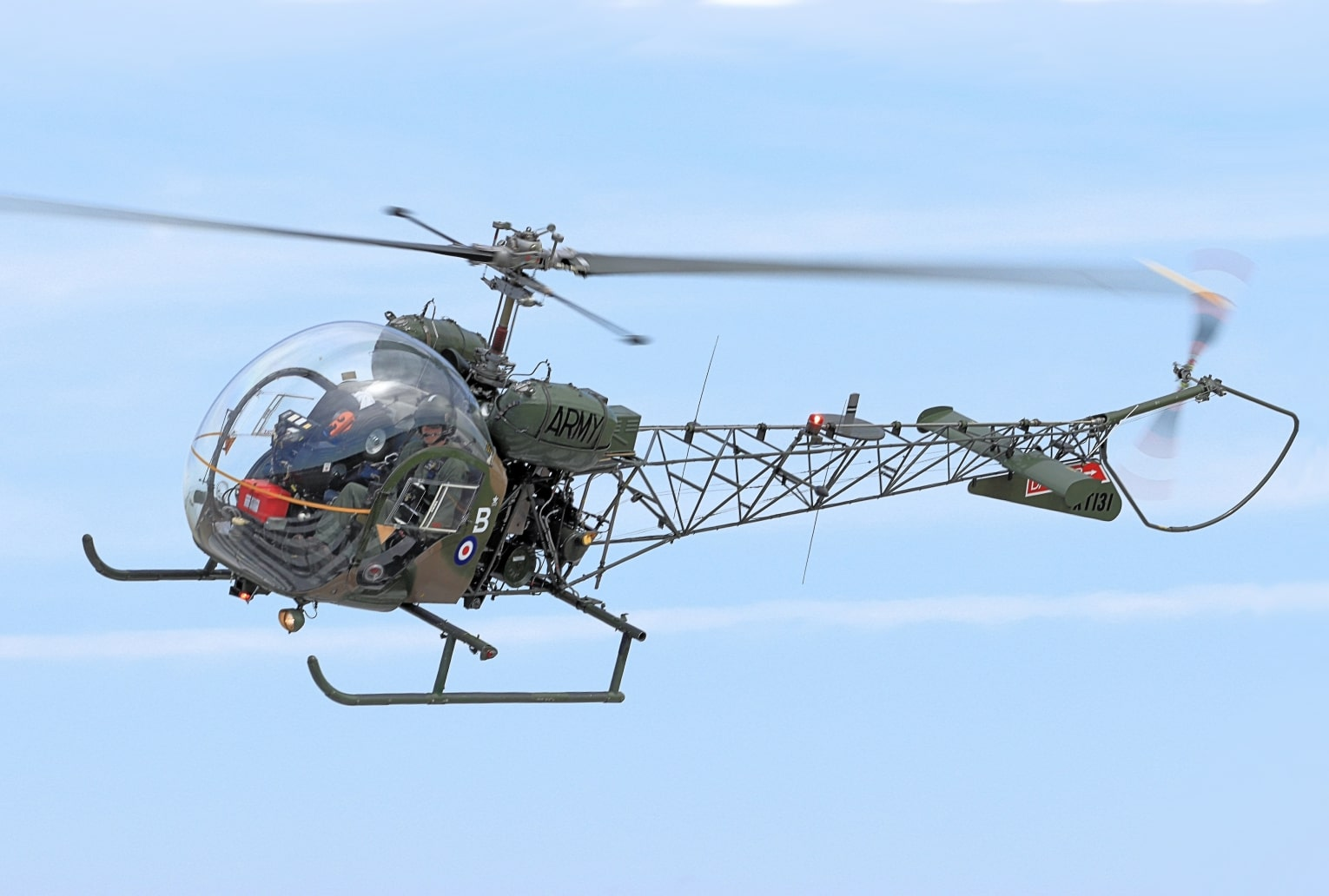
Bell 47

The 1950s syndicated American television series Whirlybirds, produced by Desilu Studios, starred a pair of Bell 47 helicopters. The association with Whirlybirds continues to be used to promote helicopters and the Bell 47 in particular. A Bell 47 was also one of the 'stars' of the Australian television series Skippy the Bush Kangaroo.

A Bell 47G3B-1 was used as the "Batcopter" in the 1966 Batman film. This airframe had previously appeared in Lassie Come Home.

A Bell 47 depicted a supposed German helicopter in the 1968 action film Where Eagles Dare. Although experimental German helicopter types did exist in this time period, the Focke-Achgelis Fa 223 was a larger, twin-rotor machine, which was used on only a limited basis.

The Bell 47, in its military configuration as a H-13 Sioux regularly appeared in the M*A*S*H film (1970) and television series (1972-1983).

=== Bell 206 ===
Chopper Squad was a 1970s Australian television series about a Bell 206 JetRanger used for rescue work in Sydney. The helicopter used was an actual rescue helicopter operated by the Westpac Life Saver Rescue Helicopter Service.

=== Bell UH-1 Iroquois ===
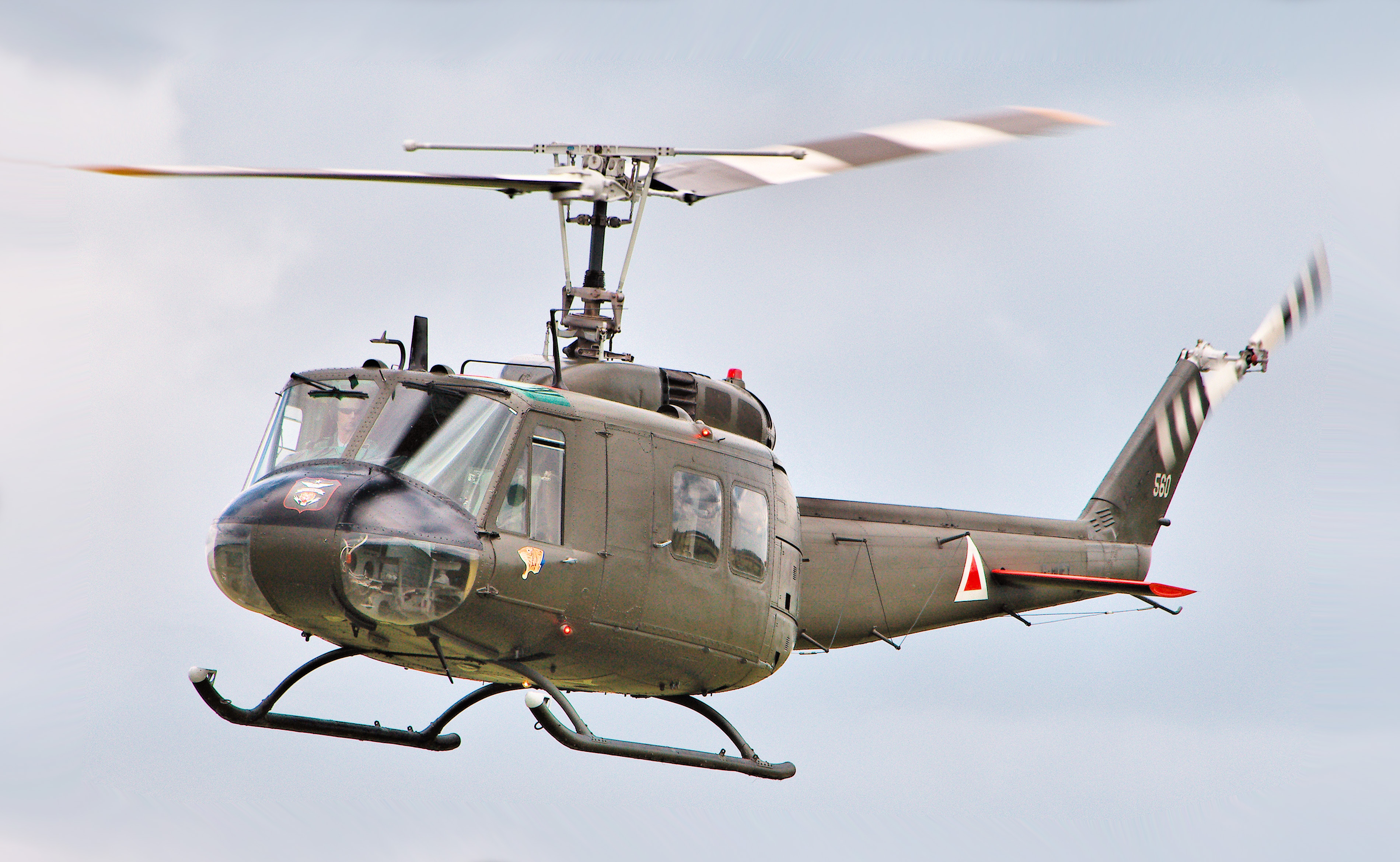
Bell UH-1 Iroquois

The Bell UH-1 Iroquois (commonly called the Huey) was the most common helicopter during the Vietnam War, as an aircraft used to insert and remove troops from the field, transport casualties for medical treatment and as a gunship. As such, it has appeared in many works of fiction related to the war.

The UH-1 was an important part of the 1968 film The Green Berets. The production company paid $18,623.64 for the material, the 85 hours of flying time by UH-1 helicopters, and 3,800 man-days for military personnel taken away from their regular duties.

The UH-1 was in Francis Ford Coppola's 1979 film Apocalypse Now. Several Hueys were rented from the Philippine Air Force. The distinct and iconic sound of the helicopters was featured prominently in the film's sound design of the soundtrack.

UH-1s were prominently featured in Oliver Stone's 1986 film Platoon.

The UH-1 is a central part of the 2002 Vietnam war film We Were Soldiers. The helicopter is shown ferrying troops into the Ia Drang valley as part of the then-new concept of air cavalry. The film particularly focused on the flights of Major Bruce Crandall, who was later awarded the Medal of Honor for his actions while piloting his UH-1 during the battle depicted in the film. Four of the UH-1s used were provided by the Georgia Army National Guard.

UH-1D helicopters are seen as the primary transport aircraft in the 2017 film Kong: Skull Island, and are attacked by Kong after launching seismic bombs in an attempt to map the Island's caves. Most are equipped with the M134 and FFAR pod armament.

=== Bell X-1 ===
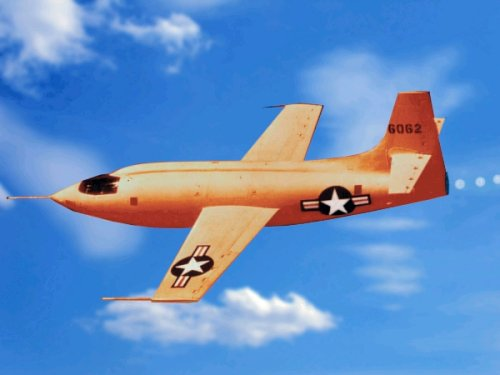
Bell X-1

The Bell X-1 was depicted early in the film The Right Stuff. The film showed the historic flight of the X-1 becoming the first aircraft to break the sound barrier in level flight under its own propulsion. This achievement helped usher in the US space program that was the subject of the rest of the film.

=== Boeing 247 ===
The 1936 movie Without Orders centers on the emergency landing of a Boeing 247 by the stewardess.

The 1936 movie 13 Hours by Air takes place largely aboard a transcontinental Boeing 247 flight and includes significant historically interesting second-unit footage of actual terminal facilities on United Air Lines's then-new transcontinental route network.

=== Boeing 707 ===
The 1961 episode "The Odyssey of Flight 33" of the television series The Twilight Zone takes place on a Boeing 707 with the aircraft traveling through various periods of history.

A Boeing 707-349C leased from Flying Tiger Line portrayed two aircraft in the 1970 film Airport, based on the 1968 Arthur Hailey novel of the same name.

The Boeing 707 is featured as the titular aircraft in Airplane!, a 1980 disaster-parody film produced by Jon Davison.

In 2011, the American television series Pan Am took place in the early and mid-1960s and featured interior sets and exterior CGI representations of the 707 on the ground and in flight; it was Pan Am's flagship airliner during that time. Additional footage of John Travolta's Boeing 707 in Pan Am livery has also been used in the TV series.

=== Boeing 727 ===
Industrial Light and Magic constructed a large-scale model of a Boeing 727 of fibreglass and aluminum for use in the 1990 action film Die Hard 2.

The 1996 film Eraser includes an elaborate action sequence involving a parachute jump from a crippled Boeing 727.

The 1998 film U.S. Marshals depicts the crash of a 727 from the Justice Prisoner and Alien Transportation System (JPATS).

=== Boeing 737 ===
In the 2008 TV series Breaking Bad, the mid-air crash between a Boeing 737 and a Beechcraft Super King Air over Albuquerque, referred to as the Wayfarer 515 disaster, takes an important part in the plot. Because of it, this model is featured and mentioned several times during the second season. Also, the episode "Seven Thirty-Seven" is named for the aircraft; it is the first of several episode titles that collectively foreshadow the Wayfarer 515 disaster. When placed together, they read "Seven Thirty-Seven Down Over ABQ".

=== Boeing 747 ===
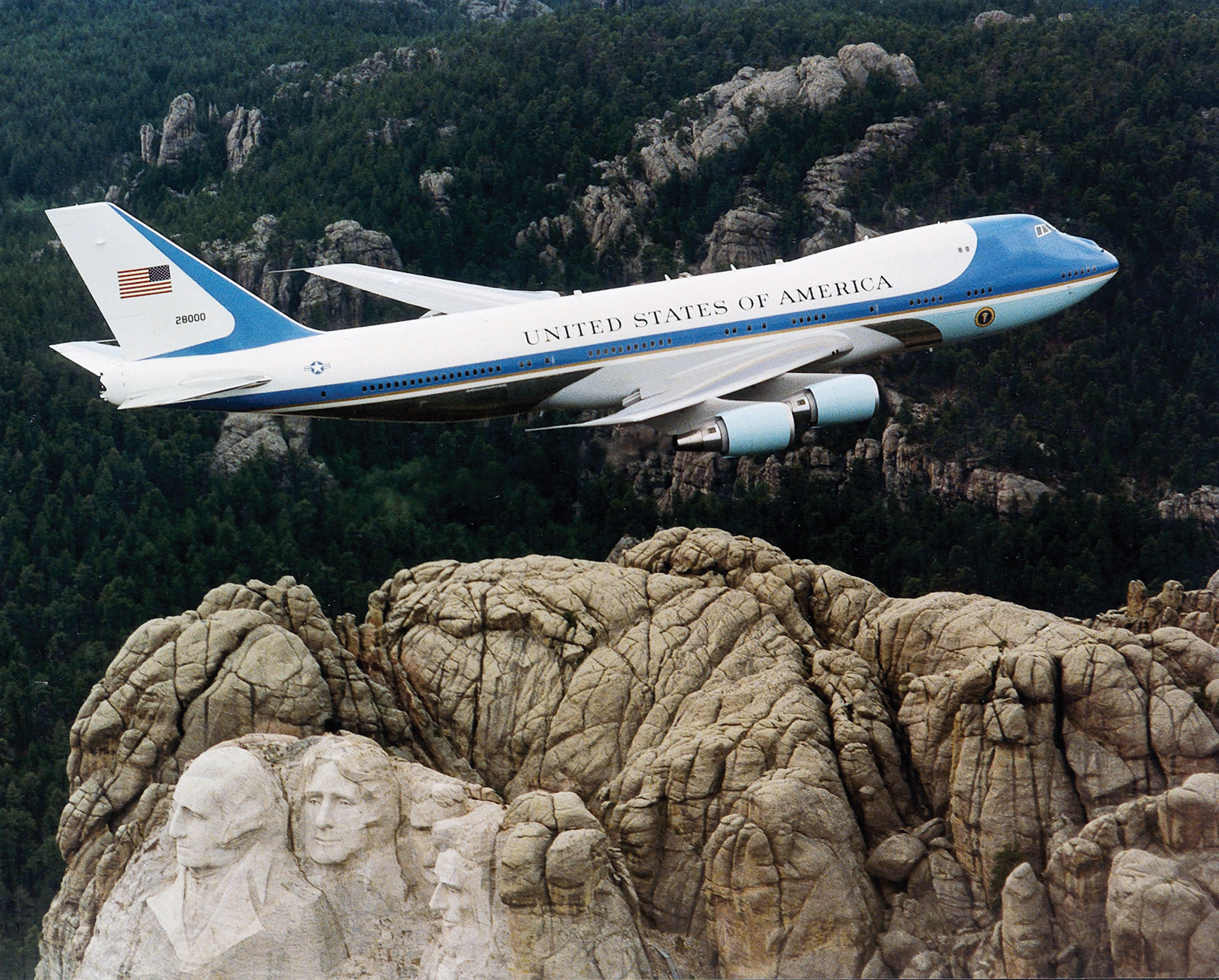
Boeing VC-25 Air Force One

In the 1990 action film Die Hard 2, a 747 that has been hijacked by terrorists is destroyed by John McClane.

The 1996 film Executive Decision features a 747 that is hijacked by terrorists.

A 747-146, rented from Kalitta Air, was the title subject of the 1997 film Air Force One, portraying the real 747-200-based VC-25 that transports the US president.

=== Boeing 757 ===
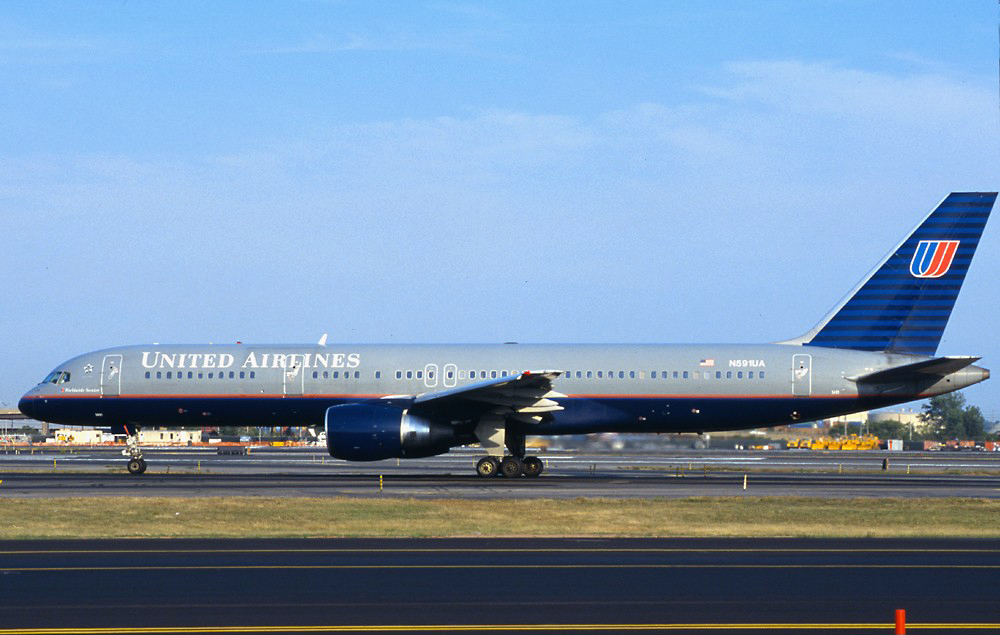
United 93, registered as N591UA, the aircraft involved in the hijacking, taxiing at Newark International Airport on September 8, 2001, three days before the attacks.

A Boeing 757 is the setting of the 2006 film United 93, that is based on the events on board United Airlines Flight 93 which was hijacked during the September 11 attacks in 2001.

=== Boeing 777 ===
A modified Boeing 777 was used as the United States Air Force mothership for an experimental NASA spaceplane in the 2006 film Superman Returns.

=== Boeing-Stearman Model 75 ===
In 1950, Paul Mantz tore the wings off a Boeing PT-13D (Model 75) Stearman by flying between two oaks for the 1950 film When Willie Comes Marching Home. A crop-dusting Stearman, N6340, was featured early in the 1963 Elvis Presley film It Happened at the World's Fair.

In the final sequence of Mission: Impossible – The Final Reckoning, two Boeing-Stearman feature in a plane chase where Tom Cruise wing walks as the planes engage in aerobatics. The scene involves Cruise jumping between planes, in reality this mid-air transfer was actually shot between a Boeing-Stearman and a helicopter with a rig to make it appear to be the wheels of the other plane. In total, four Boeing-Stearman were used in production.

=== Bristol Beaufighter ===
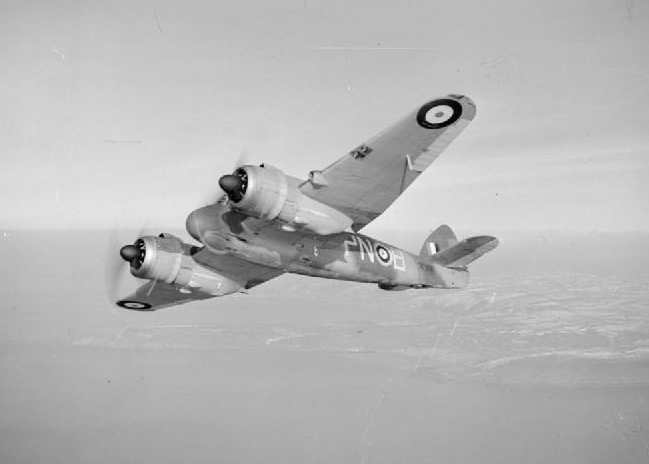
Bristol Beaufighter

Comics writer Garth Ennis' 2007 revival of the old British war comic hero Battler Britton: Bloody Good Show, featured the ace fighter pilot commanding a squadron of Bristol Beaufighters in North Africa during the Second World War.

=== Bristol Blenheim ===
Bristol Blenheims appear in the 1945 British film The Way to the Stars (released in the US as Johnny in the Clouds). In the early part of the film, Pilot Officer Peter Penrose (John Mills), a '15-hour sprog' (rookie) arrives at Halfpenny Field, a Royal Air-Force aerodrome, in the summer of 1940 and joins B-Flight of No 72 Squadron, equipped with Blenheims and commanded by Flight-Lieutenant David Archdale (Michael Redgrave).

A Bristol Blenheim IV, restored from a Bolingbroke IVT, appeared in the 1995 film Richard III, an adaptation of Shakespeare's play directed by and starring Ian McKellen; who set the play in an imaginary 1930s England ruled by a fascist-style Monarch.

=== Bristol Britannia ===
A Bristol Type 175 Britannia airliner was the central feature of the 1959 film Jet Over the Atlantic (also released as High Over the Atlantic), a drama directed by Byron Haskin and starring Guy Madison and Virginia Mayo. The film's plot is about an airliner en route from Spain to the United States. Among the passengers is an American who has been arrested for murder and is being extradited back to the US. Another passenger, rendered mentally unstable by the loss of his daughter, releases a toxic gas on board the aircraft, rendering the flight crew unconscious, and leaving the prisoner as the only person capable of flying the aircraft. Despite the film's title, the Bristol Type 175 was a turbo-prop engined aircraft rather than a jet-powered plane.

=== Bristol F2B ===
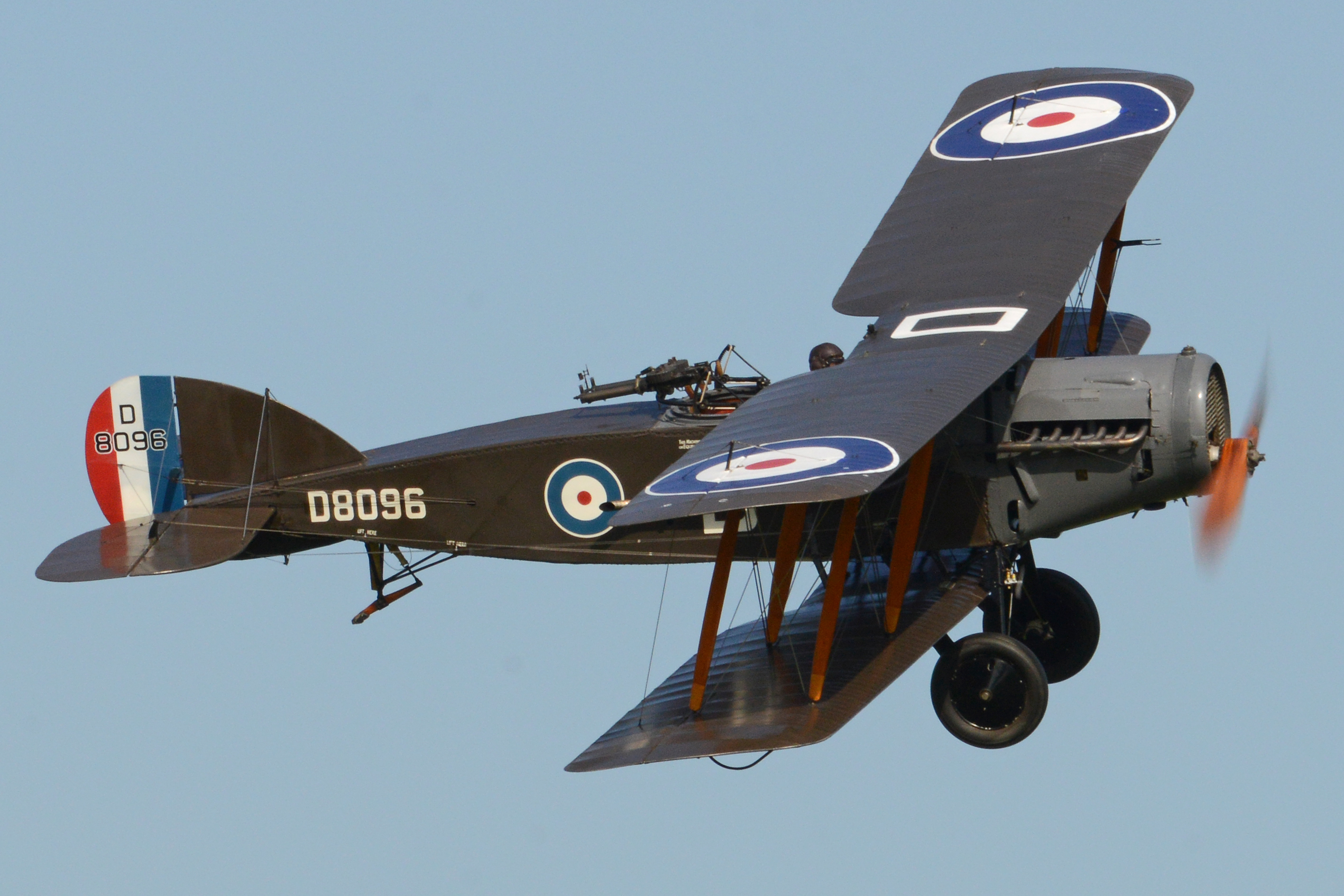
Bristol F2B

In the long-running British First World War comic strip Charley's War, published in Battle Picture Weekly 1979–1986 and written by Pat Mills and illustrated by Joe Colquhoun, the storyline goes on a tangent when Charley Bourne's younger brother Wilf enlists under-age and becomes an observer/gunner in a Bristol F2B squadron in France in early 1918.

=== Bristol Type 170 Freighter ===
A Bristol Type 170 Freighter Mk. 11A played a major role in the 1957 British film The Man in the Sky (distributed in the U.S. as Decision Against Time) directed by Charles Crichton and starring Jack Hawkins. In the film, one of the engines catches fire during a test flight, and Hawkins' character struggles to use up enough fuel to make an emergency landing. During filming, the aircraft was damaged in a crash, but was repaired and returned to service with Silver City Airways until it was retired and scrapped in 1962.

=== Bücker Bü 181 ===
In the 1963 epic film The Great Escape, the prisoners of war played by James Garner and Donald Pleasence steal a Luftwaffe Bücker Bü 181. No aircraft were involved in the actual escape from Stalag Luft III. Pleasence, who had been an aircraft wireless operator with No. 166 Squadron, was imprisoned in Stalag Luft I after his Lancaster was shot down over Germany on 31 August 1944.

== C ==
=== C-17 Globemaster III ===
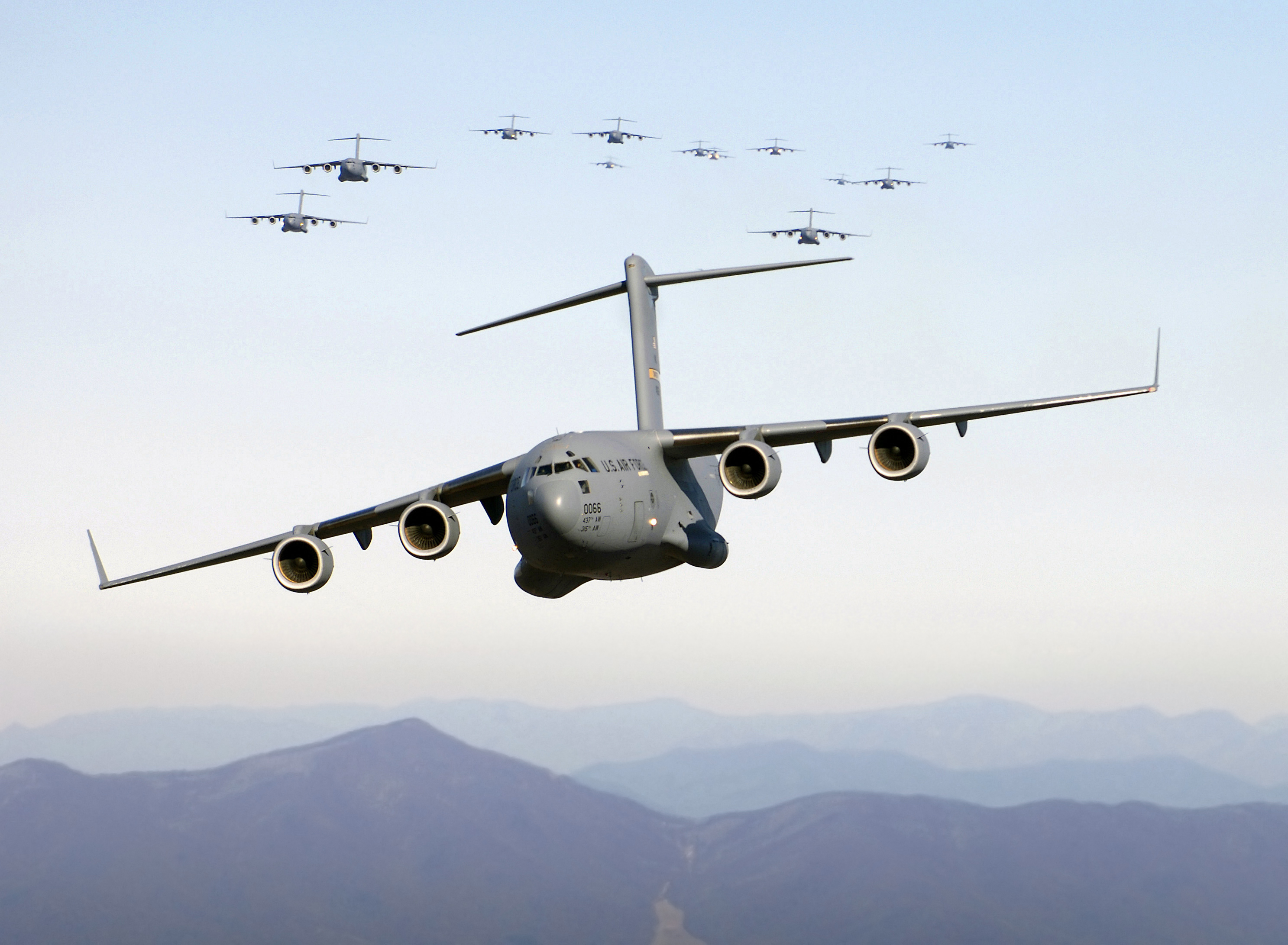
Boeing C-17 Globemaster III

In the 2018 film Mission: Impossible – Fallout, Ethan Hunt performs a HALO jump from a Boeing C-17 Globemaster III belonging to the UAE Air Force.

=== C-47 Skytrain / C-53 Skytrooper / Dakota ===
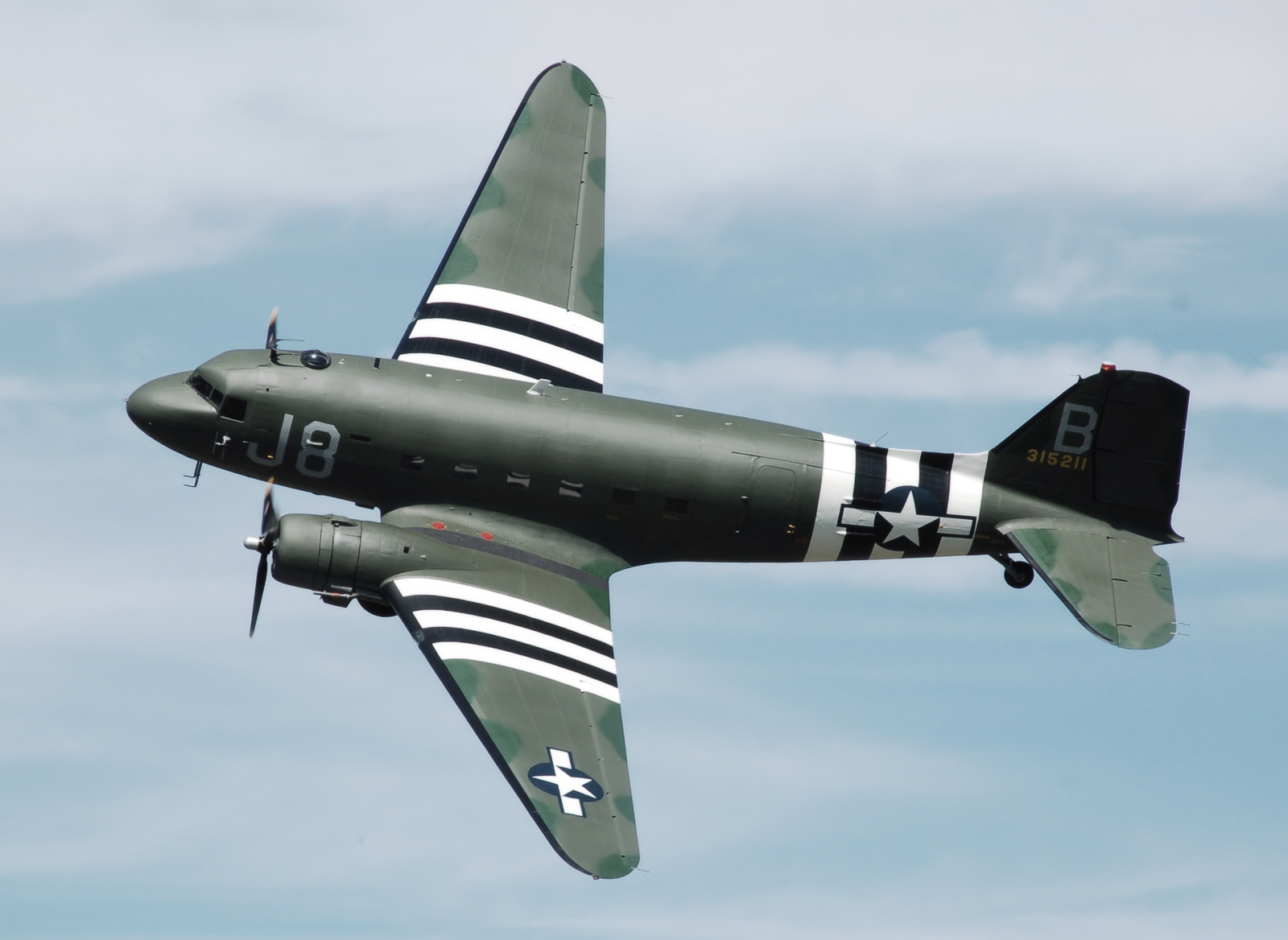
Douglas C-47 Skytrain

Eleven aircraft were gathered for airdrop scenes in the 1977 film A Bridge Too Far, all of which had to be of a paratroop configuration, representing the C-53 Skytrooper variant.

A Douglas C-47 DL Skytrain featured in the climactic scenes of the 1978 film The Wild Geese which starred Richard Burton and Roger Moore as the leaders of a group of British mercenaries sent to rescue a deposed African leader. The C-47 used in the film belonged to United Air of South Africa and was nick-named 'The Wild Goose' after its film role. The aircraft was destroyed in a crash in South Africa in 1988 which claimed the lives of all 24 people on board.

=== C-54 Skymaster ===
The 20th Century Fox production The Big Lift (originally titled Quartered City), set during the Berlin Airlift, was filmed in Berlin at a former German studio near Tempelhof in 1949 and Douglas C-54 Skymasters were prominently featured. Military personnel from Rhein-Main Air Base appeared as extras.

=== C-121 Constellation ===
Lockheed C-121A Constellation tail number 48-615 was used in the 1977 film MacArthur, starring Gregory Peck, painted in Supreme Commander for the Allied Powers (SCAP) markings.

=== C-123 Provider ===
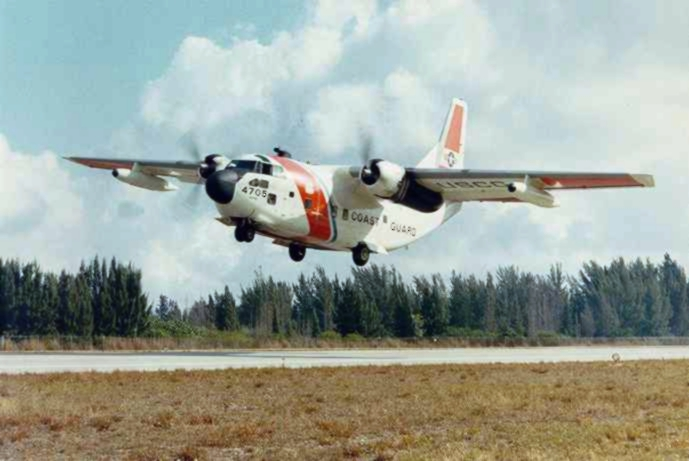
Fairchild C-123 Provider

In the 1990 action film Die Hard 2, John McClane ejects from the cockpit of a grounded Fairchild C-123 Provider for a parachute recovery just before terrorists destroy it. A full-scale fuselage mock-up, molded from a real Provider, was rigged with 3,000 bullet hits, each one drilled and loaded with a charge, tapped, and wired to discharge in sequence. Actual pyrotechnics work was done at Indian Dunes, California, with actor Bruce Willis' ejection composited into the shot later; real C-123s do not have ejection seats.

The C-123 was featured in the 1997 film Con Air, with much of the film's action taking place in and around the aircraft. Three C-123s were used in the production of the film. One aircraft was used for all of the flying sequences. Another was used for the taxiing scenes and the third Provider, non-airworthy and in poor condition, was dismantled and its fuselage was used for the filming of the climatic crash scene.

=== C-130 Hercules ===
The 1976 film Raid on Entebbe was based on a real-life Israeli military rescue mission which relied on the unique short-field capabilities of the Lockheed C-130.

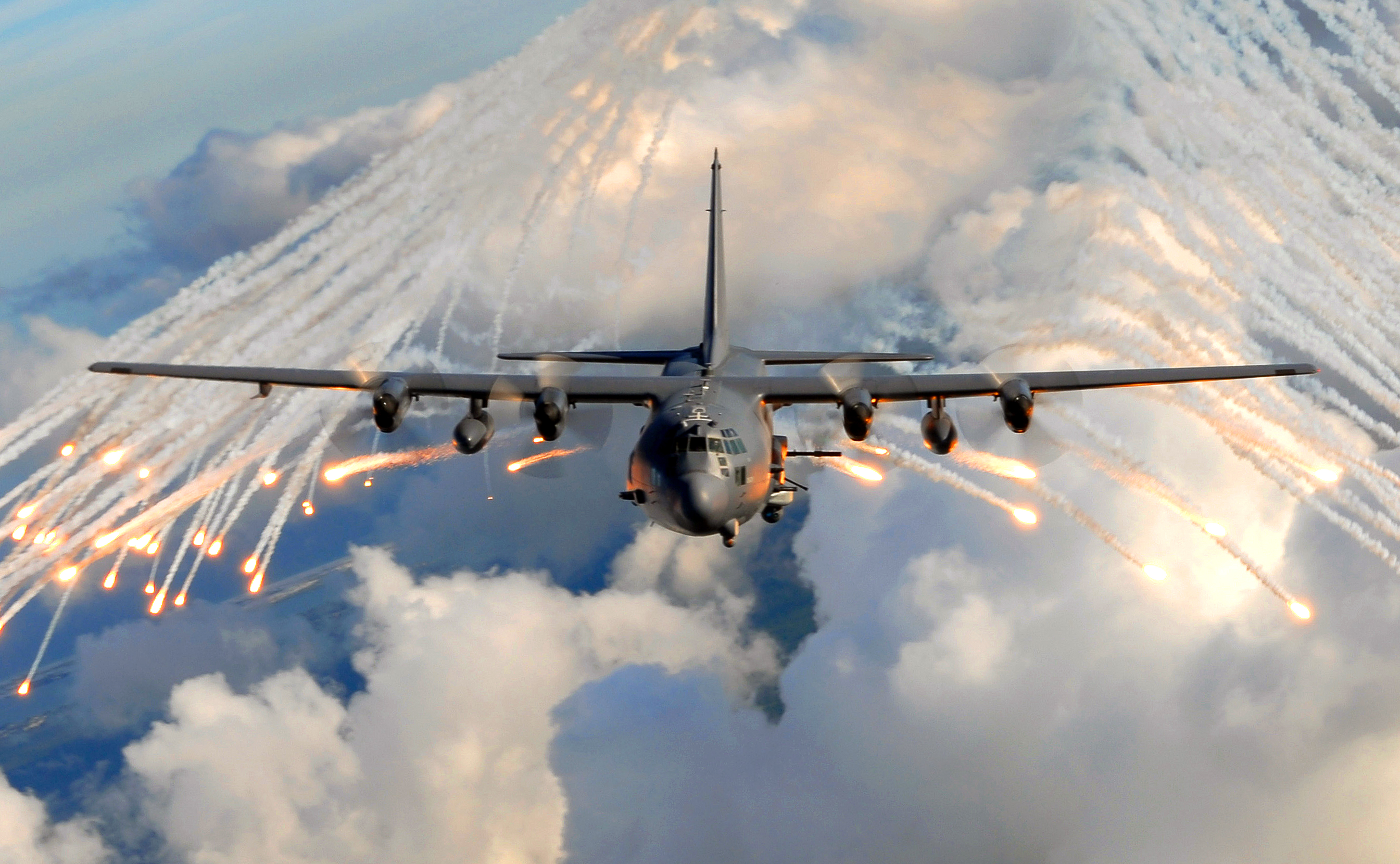
Lockheed AC-130

Guy Ritchie's 2023 film The Covenant features an AC-130 gunship in the final scene, coming to the rescue of Jake Gyllenhaal's MSG Kinley as he's pinned down at the Darunta Dam.

=== Caproni Ca.60 ===
The Caproni Ca.60 Noviplano, a nine-wing flying boat of which only a single prototype was constructed and which crashed on its first test flight in 1921, features in the 2013 Japanese animated feature The Wind Rises, a romantic dramatization of the life of Japanese aircraft designer Jiro Horikoshi. In the film, the Italian aeronautical designer Giovanni Caproni appears as a mentor to Horikoshi in several dream sequences, one of which features a tour of the Ca.60.

=== CASA 2.111 ===
Several ex-Spanish Air Force CASA 2.111s were used as "stand-ins" to depict German Heinkel He 111 bombers in the 1969 film Battle of Britain.

Four ex-Spanish CASA 2.111s, playing the role of Luftwaffe Heinkel He 111s, were also used in the production of the 1970 Oscar-winning film Patton, starring George C. Scott.

=== Cessna 310 ===
The protagonist of the 1950s American television show Sky King, played by actor Kirby Grant, flew a Cessna 310 in later episodes.

=== Cessna 402 ===
A Cessna 402, operated by the fictional small airline Sandpiper Air at Tom Nevers Field airport, Nantucket, was featured in the NBC-TV sitcom Wings which ran for eight seasons, 1990–1997.

=== Cessna T-50 ===
The protagonist of the 1950s television show Sky King flew a Cessna T-50 in early episodes; the aircraft was later replaced by a Cessna 310.

=== CH-34 Choctaw / Westland Wessex ===
Westland Wessex helicopters portrayed Sikorsky CH-34 Choctaws in Stanley Kubrick's 1987 film Full Metal Jacket.

=== Concorde ===
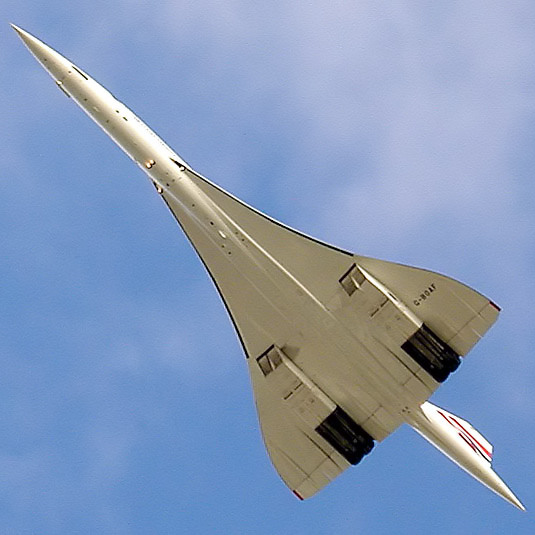
Concorde

In the 2017 film The Wife, two significant scenes, including the final one in the movie, take place on Concorde flights transporting a Nobel Prize winner. They were shot in the aircraft displayed at Scotland's National Museum of Flight.

Lego released a set based on the Concorde. The set has 2,083 pieces and features the iconic design and the interior of the plane.

== D ==
=== Dassault Mirage 2000 ===
The Dassault Mirage 2000 features in the film Les Chevaliers du ciel (Sky Fighters), a 2005 French film directed by Gérard Pirès about two air force pilots preventing a terrorist attack on the Bastille Day celebrations in Paris.

=== de Havilland Hornet Moth ===
The novel Hornet Flight by Ken Follett is a thriller of the Resistance against the Nazi occupation of Denmark in World War II. In the novel a de Havilland Hornet Moth is used by the protagonists to fly from Denmark to the United Kingdom with information about a German radar system. The author drew inspiration from an actual flight that took place during World War II.

=== de Havilland Mosquito ===
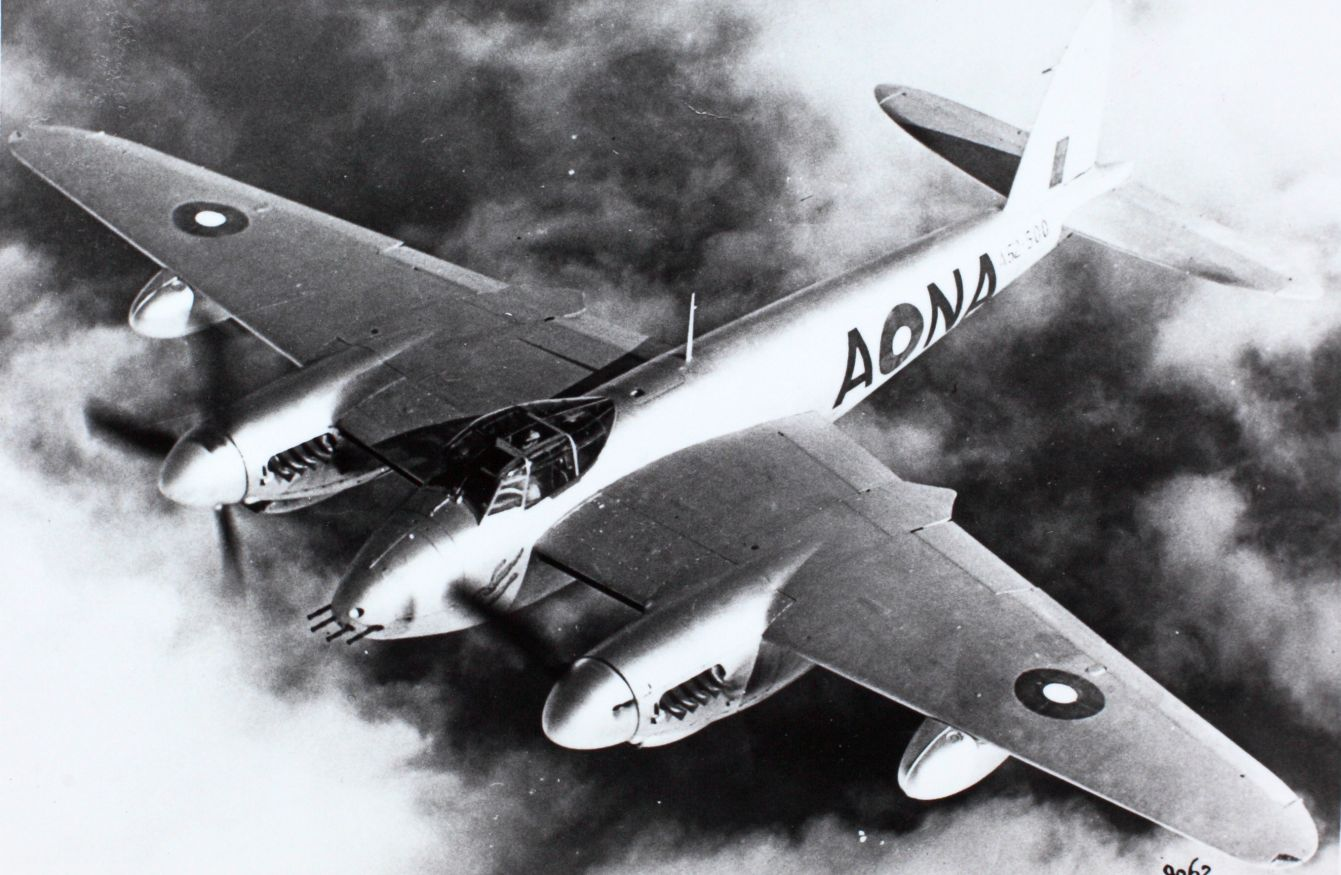
de Havilland Mosquito

De Havilland Mosquitos play the title role of the 1969 film Mosquito Squadron, starring David McCallum and Charles Gray.

The Mosquito plays an important role with the de Havilland Vampire in Frederick Forsyth's 1975 novella The Shepherd.

=== de Havilland Vampire ===
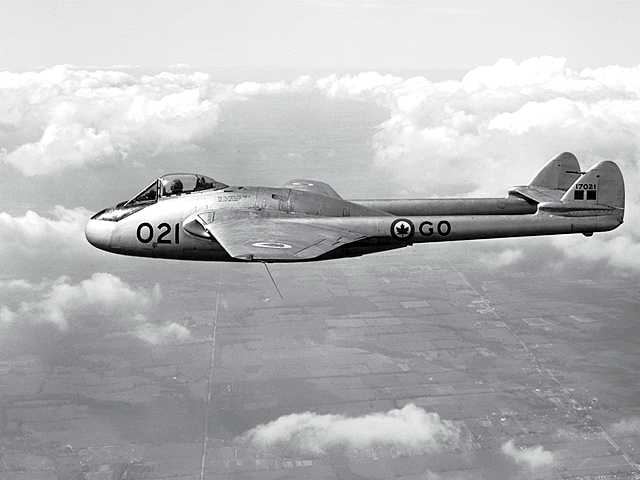
A de Havilland Vampire

De Havilland Vampires appear in the 1954 British motion picture Conflict of Wings, a drama about the conflict that arises when an RAF squadron based in Norfolk is allocated a small island to use as a range for low-level attack training only to encounter the protests of nearby villagers who want the island preserved as a bird sanctuary.

Vampires appear in the 1966 novel Shooting Script by former RAF pilot and thriller writer Gavin Lyall.

The Vampire is central to the plot of the 1975 novella, The Shepherd by British novelist Frederick Forsyth, the story of an RAF pilot attempting to fly home for Christmas from RAF Celle, Germany, to RAF Lakenheath on Christmas Eve 1957. The fact that the DH.100 was not fitted with ejection seats until about ten years later, and hence was a major challenge to bail out of, is an important element of the story.

=== Douglas DC-2 ===
A Douglas DC-2, PH-AJU, "Uiver", race number 44, was depicted by Douglas DC-3, VH-ANR, in the 1991 Australian mini-series The Great Air Race, about the 1934 London to Melbourne MacRobertson Trophy Air Race. It is also known as Half a World Away.

=== Douglas DC-3 ===
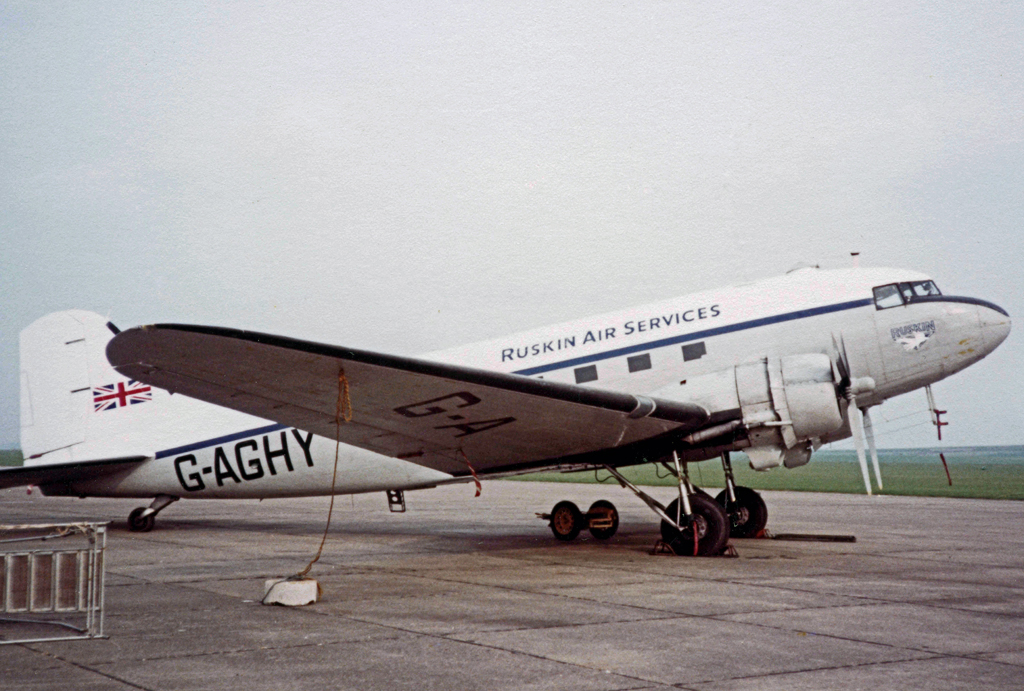
A Douglas DC-3 painted in Ruskin Air Services fictional markings during filming at Duxford Airfield in 1982 for the British television series Airline.

The 1961 episode of The Twilight Zone entitled "The Arrival" features a Douglas DC-3 on Flight 107, which arrives at its destination with no one on board. It originally aired on 22 September 1961.

The chief character of the 1965 novel High Citadel by Desmond Bagley is an alcoholic former Korean War fighter pilot who flies a Douglas DC-3 for a small airline in a fictional Andean country in South America. He is forced at gunpoint by his co-pilot—a Communist agent—to crash-land the DC-3 at a remote abandoned mine in the Andes so that Communists planning a coup can capture and kill a politician travelling as a passenger. The 1966 suspense novel Flying Finish by Dick Francis features a DC-3 being used to transport race horces.

A DC-3 starred in the 1982 British television series Airline. The aircraft used to depict the DC-3 of the fictional Ruskin Air Services was also used in the 1980s television series Tenko and the 2001 series Band of Brothers.

=== Douglas DC-4 ===
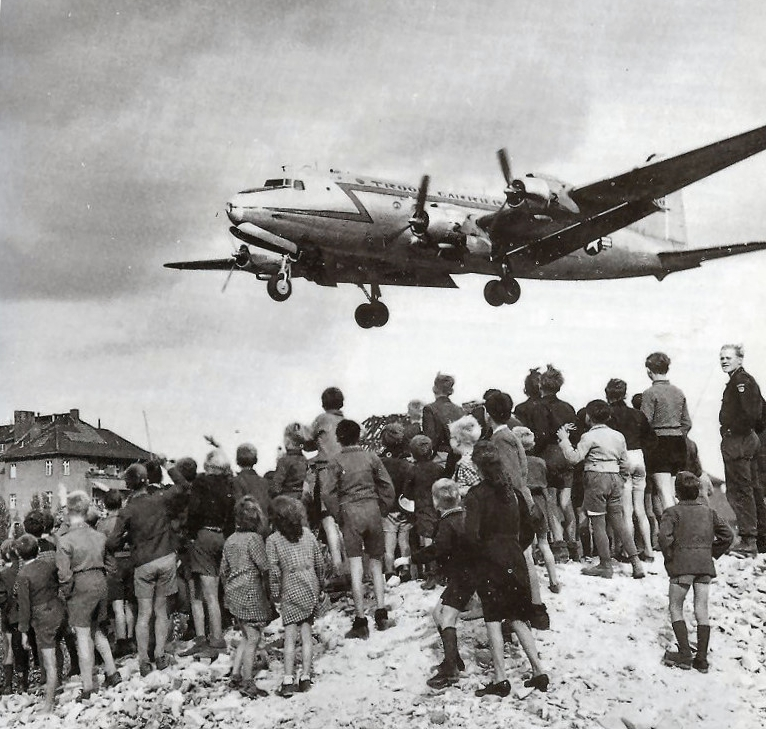
Douglas C-54 Skymaster lands in Berlin during the Berlin Airlift

The Douglas DC-4 appears in the Ernest K. Gann novel The High and the Mighty. A former USAF Douglas C-54 Skymaster operated by Transocean Air Lines portrayed the Douglas DC-4 in the John Wayne 1954 film of the same name. Ironically, this airframe was lost over the Pacific on 28 March 1964 with an engine fire just as depicted in the film. There were no survivors of the nine "souls on board" and the wreckage was never found.

=== Douglas DC-8 ===
In the 1990 action film Die Hard 2, a Douglas DC-8 is given false landing instructions by terrorists and crash lands in a blizzard, resulting in fatalities to all on board. Industrial Light and Magic used a 23-foot-long model to shoot the effects of the crash and explosion. Filming was done at a remote airstrip in the Mojave Desert of California. "However, shots of the passengers' frightened reactions to the initial impact, which had been shot on a set and originally cut into the movie, were so terrifying (made all the more authentic by preproduction research of Federal Aviation Administration test crashes and data from real aircraft crashes) that they were ultimately cut before the film's release." ILM constructed five DC-8 models for the production.

== F ==
=== F2H Banshee ===
Protagonist Lt. Harry Brubaker flew a McDonnell F2H Banshee in the 1953 James A. Michener novel The Bridges at Toko-ri. In the subsequent 1954 film adaptation, his aircraft was changed to a Grumman F9F Panther.

=== F-4 Phantom II ===
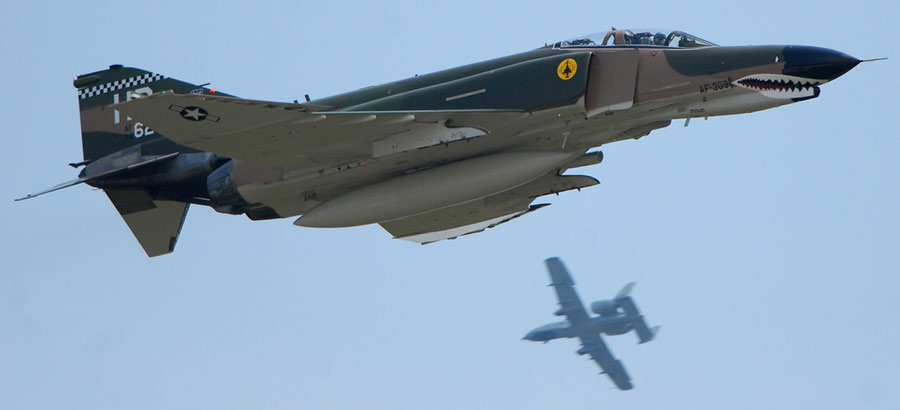
F-4 Phantom

In the 1988 film Iron Eagle II, McDonnell Douglas F-4 Phantom IIs appear as Soviet MiGs. The aircraft were provided by the Israeli Air Force for the production.

=== F4U Corsair ===
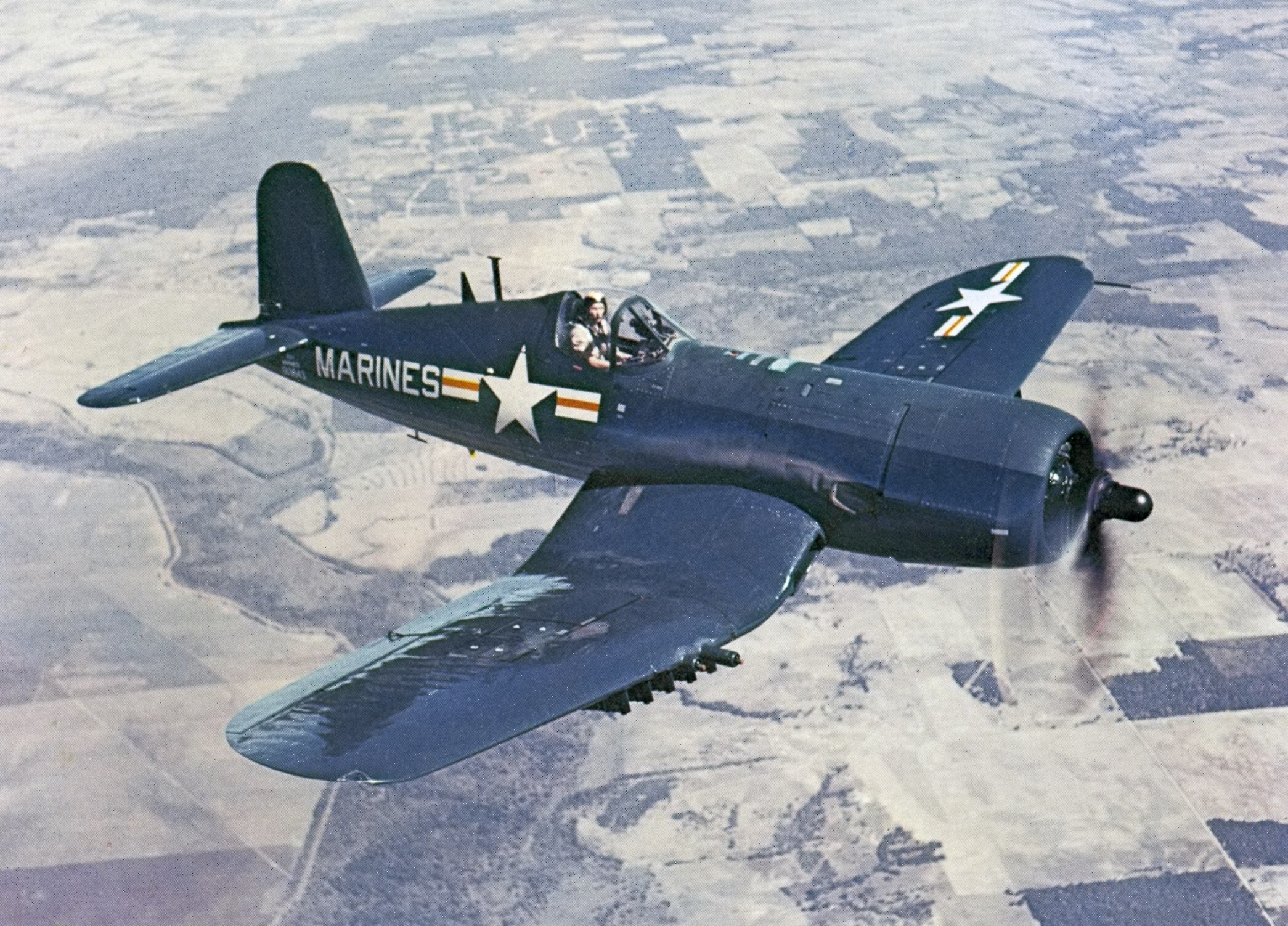
F4U Corsair

Vought F4U Corsairs featured in the latter part of the 1951 RKO war movie Flying Leathernecks which was directed by Nicholas Ray and starred John Wayne and Robert Ryan. The film's fictional Marine Air Corps unit exchange their older fighters for new F4Us as they support the drive across the Pacific in the latter stages of the war. For the film, the producers borrowed a number of flying F4Us which were then serving as trainers at the Marine Air Base at El Toro, California, and they also incorporated some wartime colour footage of F4Us taken during WW2.

F4Us also featured in the 1952 Monogram film Flat Top which was directed by Lesley Selander and starred Sterling Hayden. In the film, Hayden plays Commander Dan Collier who takes command of a squadron of un-disciplined fighter pilots on board an aircraft carrier and is tasked with getting them combat-ready before the invasion of the Japanese-occupied Philippines in 1944. The film made extensive use of colour wartime footage of carrier-borne F4Us.

The F4U Corsair is also featured in the 2022 Korean War drama film Devotion.

=== F5F Skyrocket ===
The sole Grumman XF5F-1 Skyrocket, which never entered production or squadron service, was incorporated as the primary mount for Blackhawk and the Blackhawk Squadron in wartime editions of the anthology series Military Comics published by Quality Comics, the first issue of which was published in August 1941. The long-running title was later acquired by DC Comics, with the squadron upgrading to more modern types.

=== F6F Hellcat ===
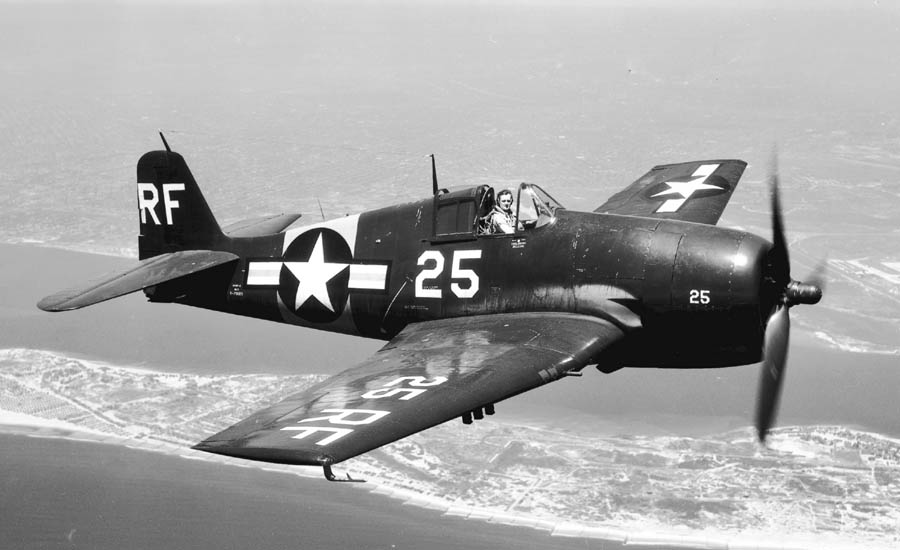
Grumman F6F-5 Hellcat

Grumman F6F Hellcats appear in the 1964 novel The Last Tallyho by Richard Newhafer, a work inspired by the author's real-life experiences as a Hellcat pilot during WW2.

=== F9F Panther ===
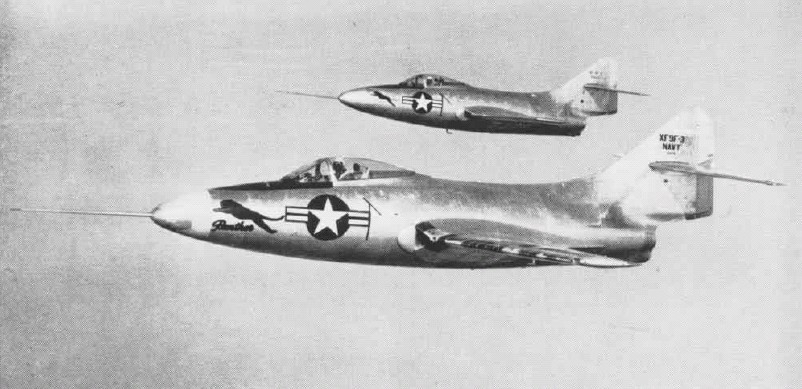
Grumman F9F Panthers

The Grumman F9F-2 Panther was prominently featured in the 1954 films Men of the Fighting Lady and The Bridges at Toko-Ri. The latter film was based on the 1953 novel of the same name, whose protagonist flew a McDonnell F2H Banshee.

=== F-14 Tomcat ===
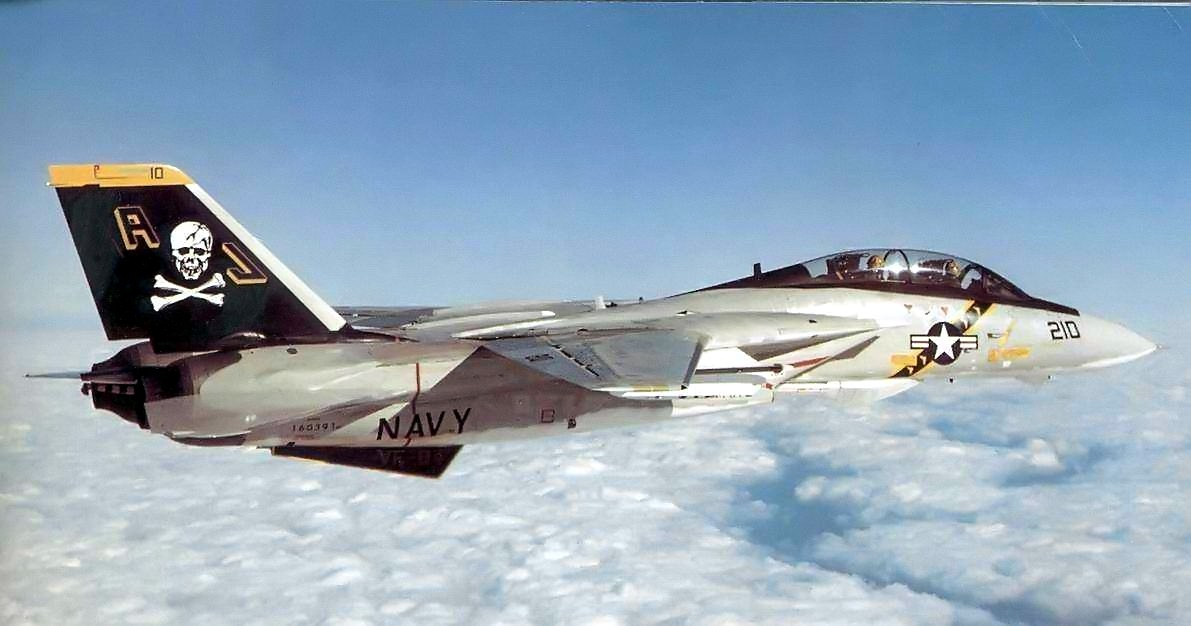
F-14 Tomcat

The Grumman F-14 Tomcat was central to the 1986 film Top Gun. The U.S. Navy provided F-14s at $7,600 per flight hour for a total bill of $886,000 ($2,602,000 today). The aviation-themed film created such interest in naval aviation that the Navy set up recruitment desks outside some theaters. The F-14 also appears in the climax of the 2022 sequel Top Gun: Maverick.

The F-14 is the primary focus of the After Burner video game series by Sega.

=== F-15 Eagle ===
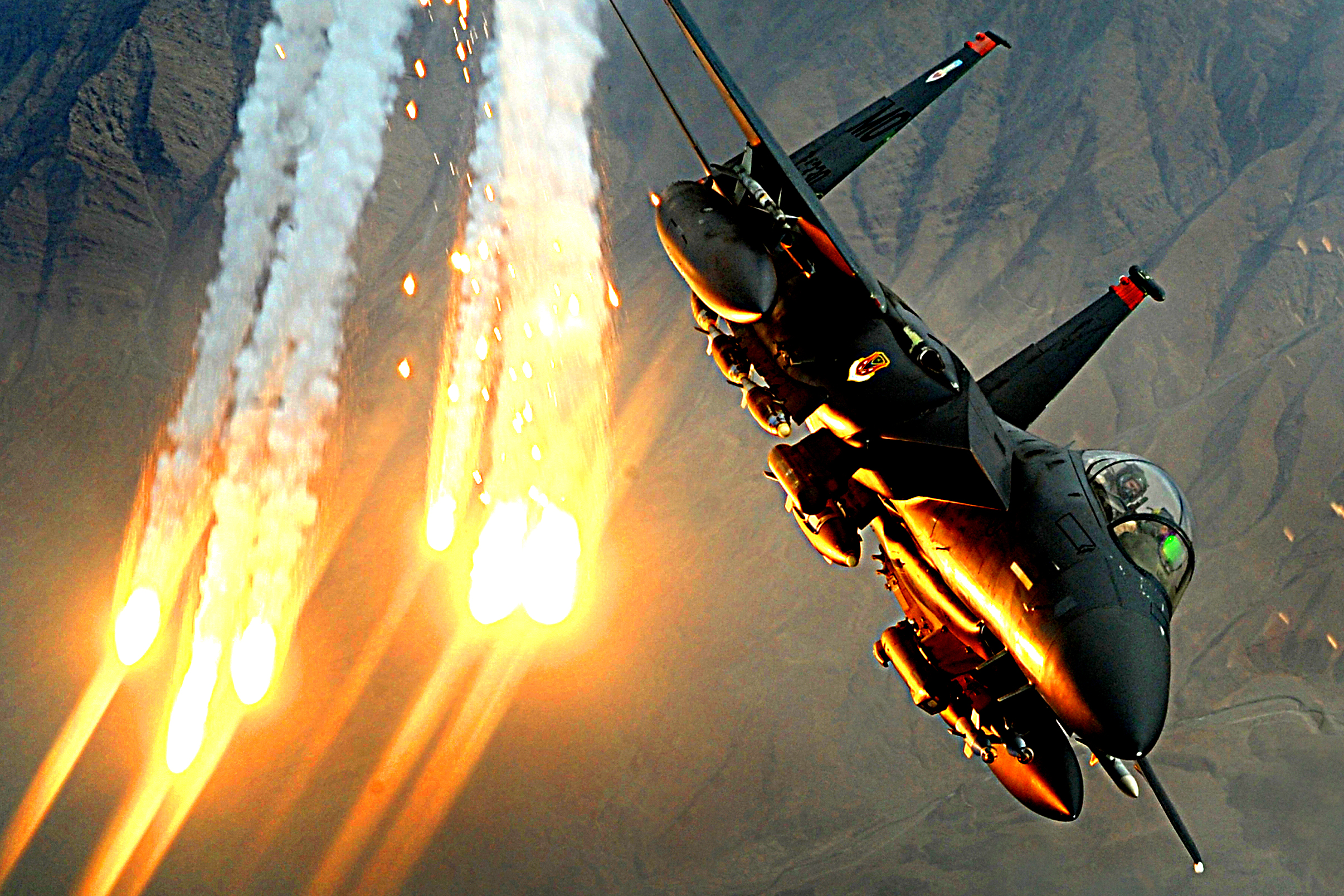
F-15 Strike Eagle

The McDonnell Douglas F-15 Eagle appears in the 1980 novel Eagles by M.H. Davis, a work which portrays pilots of the USAF.

The F-15 has appeared in numerous video games, including the 1985 Microprose title F-15 Strike Eagle. F-15 also appears in Jane's Combat Simulations 1998 game F-15.

=== F-16 Fighting Falcon ===
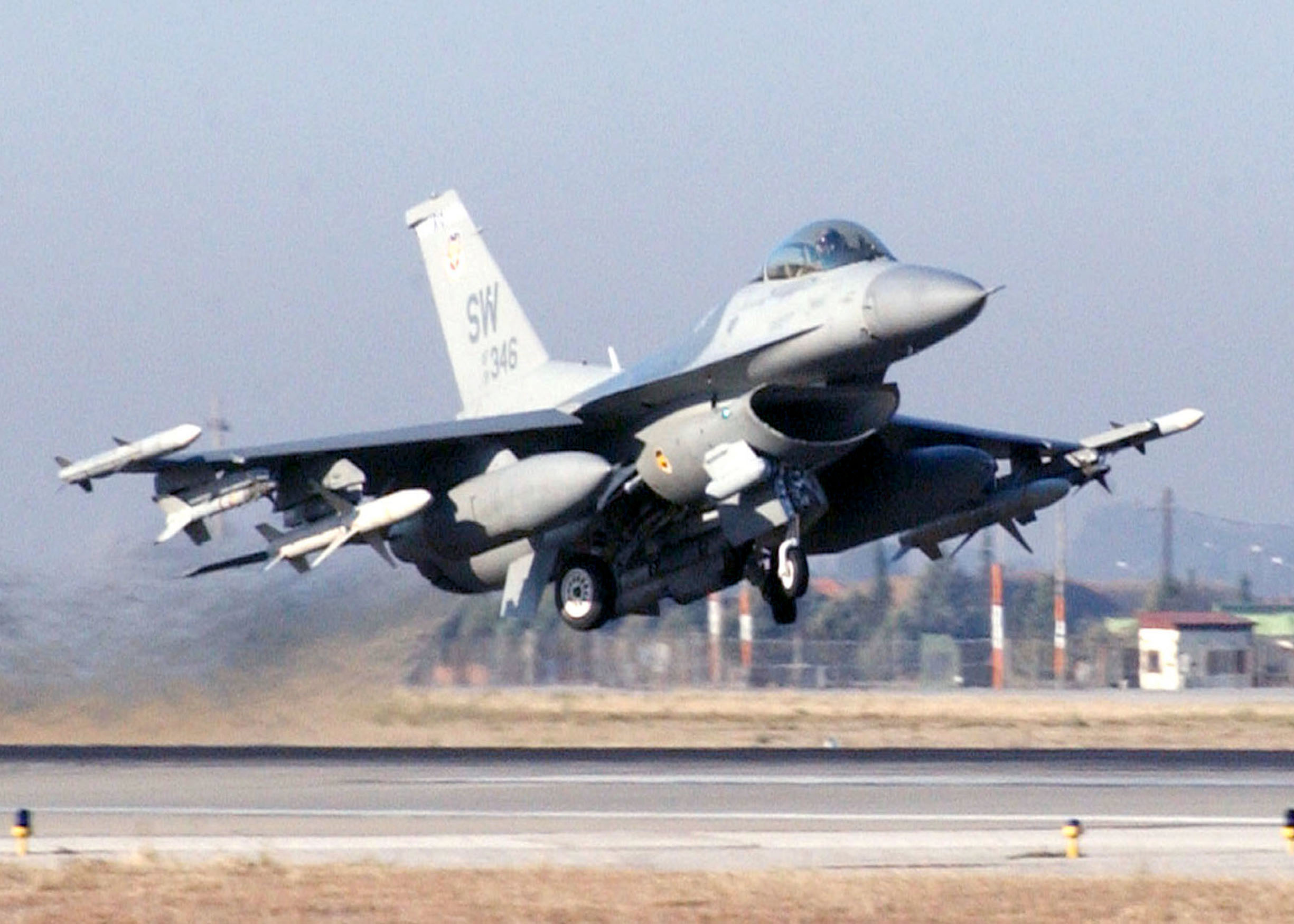
F-16 Fighting Falcon

The General Dynamics F-16 Fighting Falcon was one of the stars of the 1986 film Iron Eagle. The US Air Force refused to assist with production of the film because it found the plot about a teenager flying an F-16 into a foreign country to be "a little off the wall".

=== F/A-18E/F Super Hornet ===
The aircraft appears in the 2000 video game F/A-18, part of Jane's Combat Simulations series.

Two F/A-18s are depicted as having gone rogue in the film Captain America: Brave New World, leading to them being destroyed by the Falcon and Captain America

=== F-20 Tigershark ===
The Northrop F-20 Tigershark appears a number of times in Kaoru Shintani's manga/animated franchise Area 88, as a personal unit of main character Shin Kazama.

=== F-22 Raptor ===
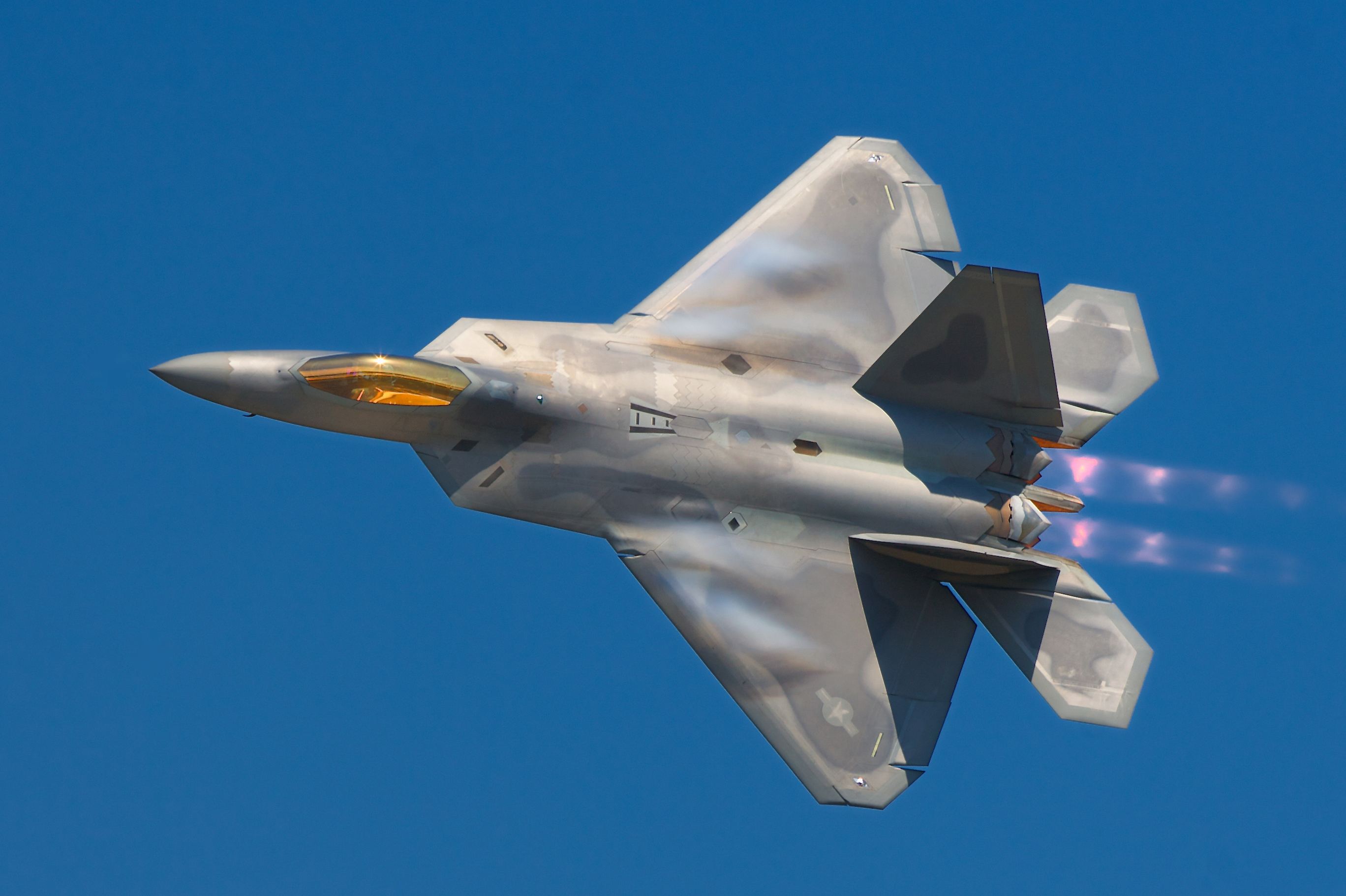
F-22 Raptor

The Lockheed Martin F-22 Raptor is the subject of a flight-simulation video game, F-22 Interceptor, which was released by Electronic Arts and Ingram Entertainment for the Sega Mega Drive console in 1991.

=== F-35 Lightning II ===
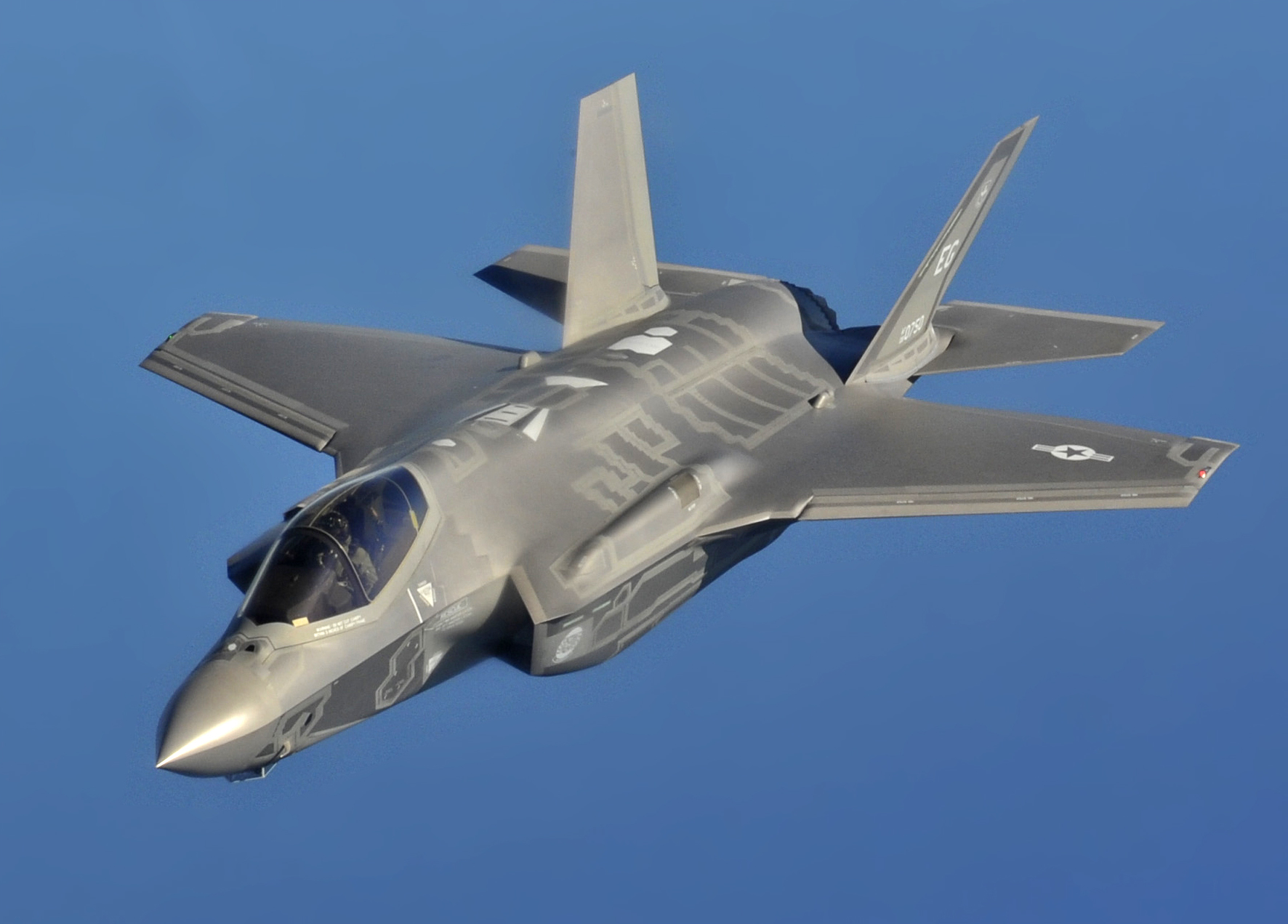
Lockheed Martin F-35 Lightning II

The first major film appearance of a representation of a Lockheed Martin F-35 Lightning II was 2006's Superman Returns. During this film, a pair of F-35A fighters escorted the modified Boeing 777 mothership for an experimental NASA spaceplane. This visualization was a combination of an actual cockpit and CGI for the aircraft in flight.

The next major film appearance of an F-35 was in Live Free or Die Hard (released as Die Hard 4.0 outside North America) in 2007. The film used a combination of a full-scale model and CGI effects.

=== F-84 Thunderjet, Thunderstreak ===
For the 1955 biographical film The McConnell Story about ace Joseph C. McConnell, eight Republic F-84s of the 614th Fighter-Bomber Squadron donned dark blue paint with red stars to portray Mikoyan-Gurevich MiG-15s doing mock battle for the cameras with F-86 Sabres of the 366th Fighter-Bomber Squadron, both units based at Alexandria AFB, Louisiana. Air Defense Command headquarters notified its pilots in January 1955 that the mock MiGs would be operating over portions of the southwestern US.

=== F-86 Sabre ===
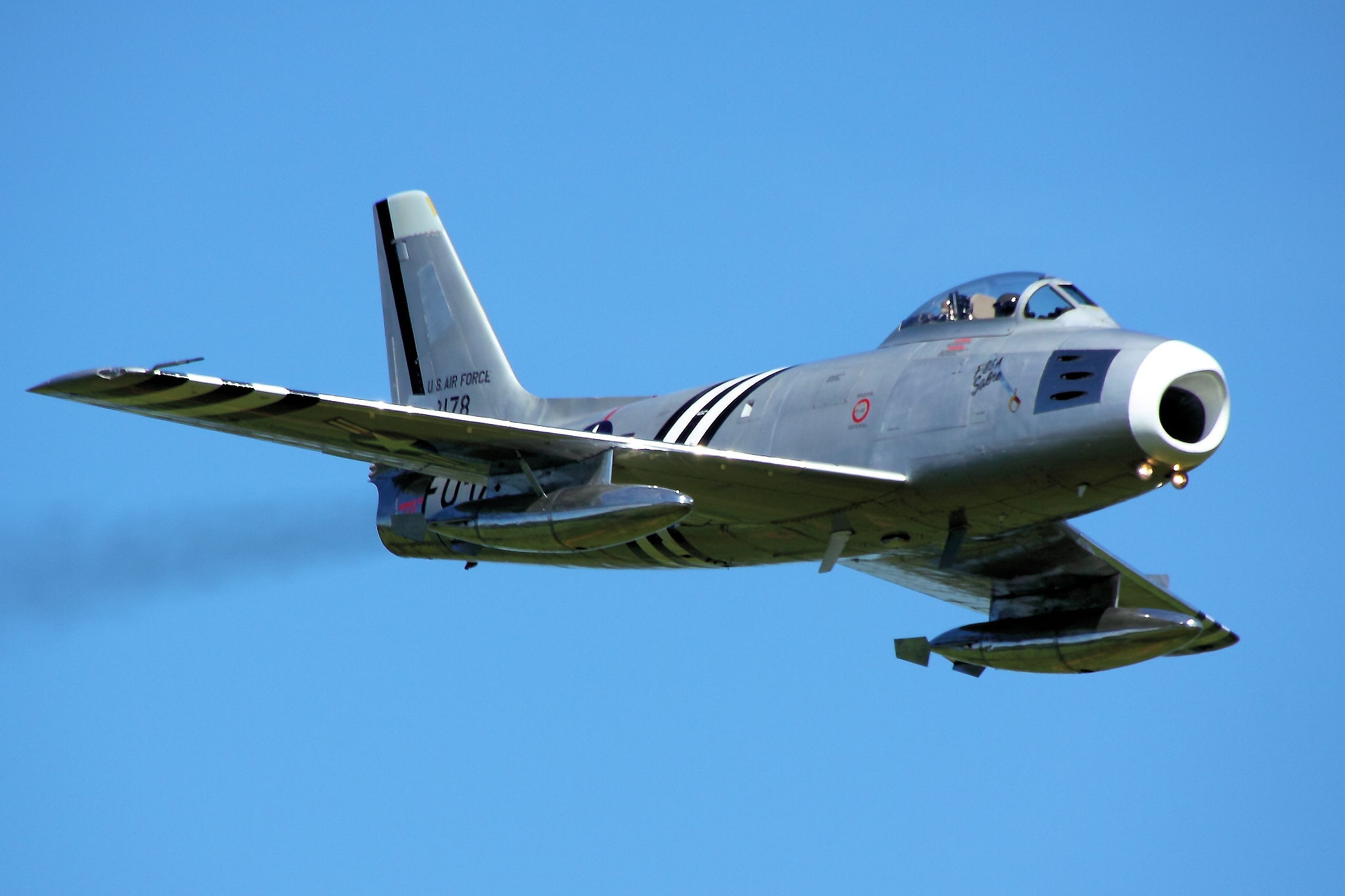
F-86A Sabre

North American F-86 Sabres appear in the 1957 junior fiction novel Sabre Pilot by Stephen W. Meader about a youngster named Kirk Owen who enlists in the USAF and serves as a fighter pilot in the Korean War.

F-86s were a feature in the 1958 film Jet Attack which was directed by Edward L. Cahn and starred John Agar and Audrey Totter. The film, also released as Jet Alert and Through Hell to Glory, was a drama set in the Korean War about a pair of pilots who parachute behind North Korean lines to rescue a captured scientist. The film, a low budget production, relied heavily on stock footage of F-86s for the aerial scenes.

F-86s appear in the 1959 novel MiG Alley by Robert Eunson which portrays a pilot Captain Homer 'Mac' McCullough who flies F-86s during the Korean War and is frustrated at being forbidden to engage enemy MiGs beyond the Yalu River.

Desmond Bagley's 1965 novel High Citadel features F-86 Sabres, which make up the frontline equipment of the air force of the fictional South American country in which the book is set. There are four squadrons of Sabres; two are loyal to the current corrupt government; one is secretly loyal to a reformist politician who is returning from exile to take over the country; and the fourth is secretly loyal to Communist forces who are attempting to kill the politician. The latter part of the novel features a dogfight between a Sabre flown by one of the main characters—a CIA agent and former Sabre pilot who fought in the Korean War—and aircraft of the Communist squadron.

=== F-104 Starfighter ===
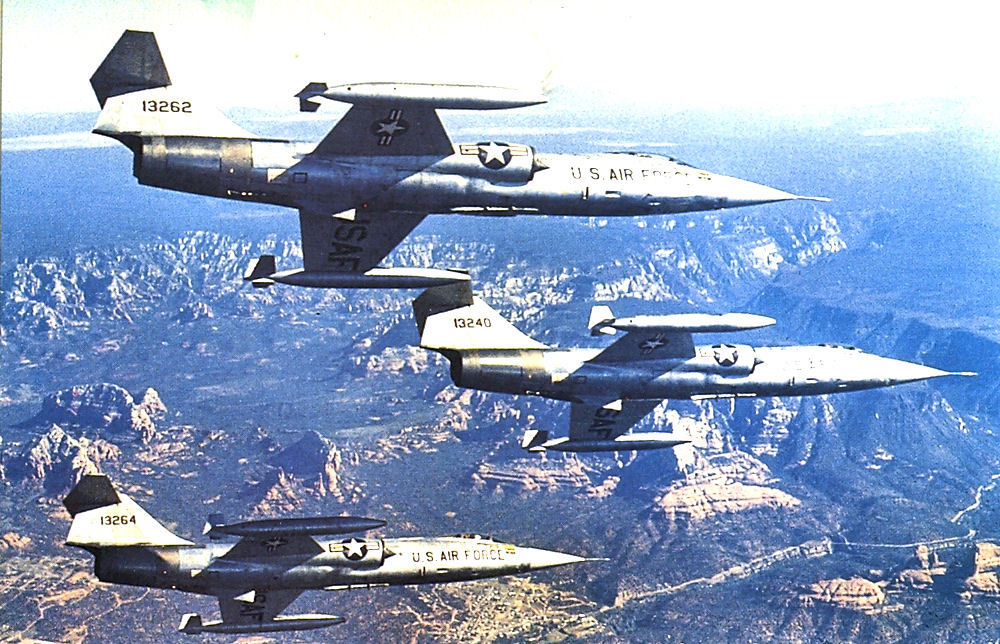
A formation of Lockheed F-104 Starfighters

Gen. Charles "Chuck" Yeager's 10 December 1963 flying accident during a test flight in a modified rocket-boosted Lockheed NF-104A Starfighter was featured in The Right Stuff motion picture. The aircraft used for filming was a standard German Luftwaffe F-104G, flying with its wingtip fuel tanks removed; it otherwise lacked any of the NF-104A's modifications, most visibly the rocket engine pod at the base of the vertical stabilizer.

The F-104 is featured heavily in the 1964 film The Starfighters, directed by Will Zens and starring future US Congressman Bob Dornan. The film later appeared on the Comedy Central series Mystery Science Theater 3000 as the subject of episode #612.

An F-104 Starfighter flown by Captain John Christopher, USAF, intercepts the USS Enterprise after the ship is thrown back in time by an encounter with a previously unmapped "black star" in Star Trek first-season episode 1/19, "Tomorrow Is Yesterday", as the starship is struggling to climb out of Earth's atmosphere over Omaha, Nebraska.

Captain Lockheed and the Starfighters is a 1974 satirical concept album by Robert Calvert and others, telling a fictionalized tale of the F-104G's acquisition by and service with the German Air Force. The album included tracks with names such as "The Widowmaker" and "Catch a Falling Starfighter".

=== Fairchild Hiller FH-227 ===
A Fairchild Hiller FH-227D was featured in Alive: The Story of the Andes Survivors by Piers Paul Read, and the 1992 film adaptation Alive.

=== Fairey Fox ===
The Fairey Fox I, G-ACXO, race number 35, which participated in the 1934 London to Melbourne MacRobertson Trophy Air Race, was portrayed in the 1991 Australian mini-series The Great Air Race, also known as Half a World Away, by an unlikely Boeing Stearman.

=== Fairey Swordfish ===
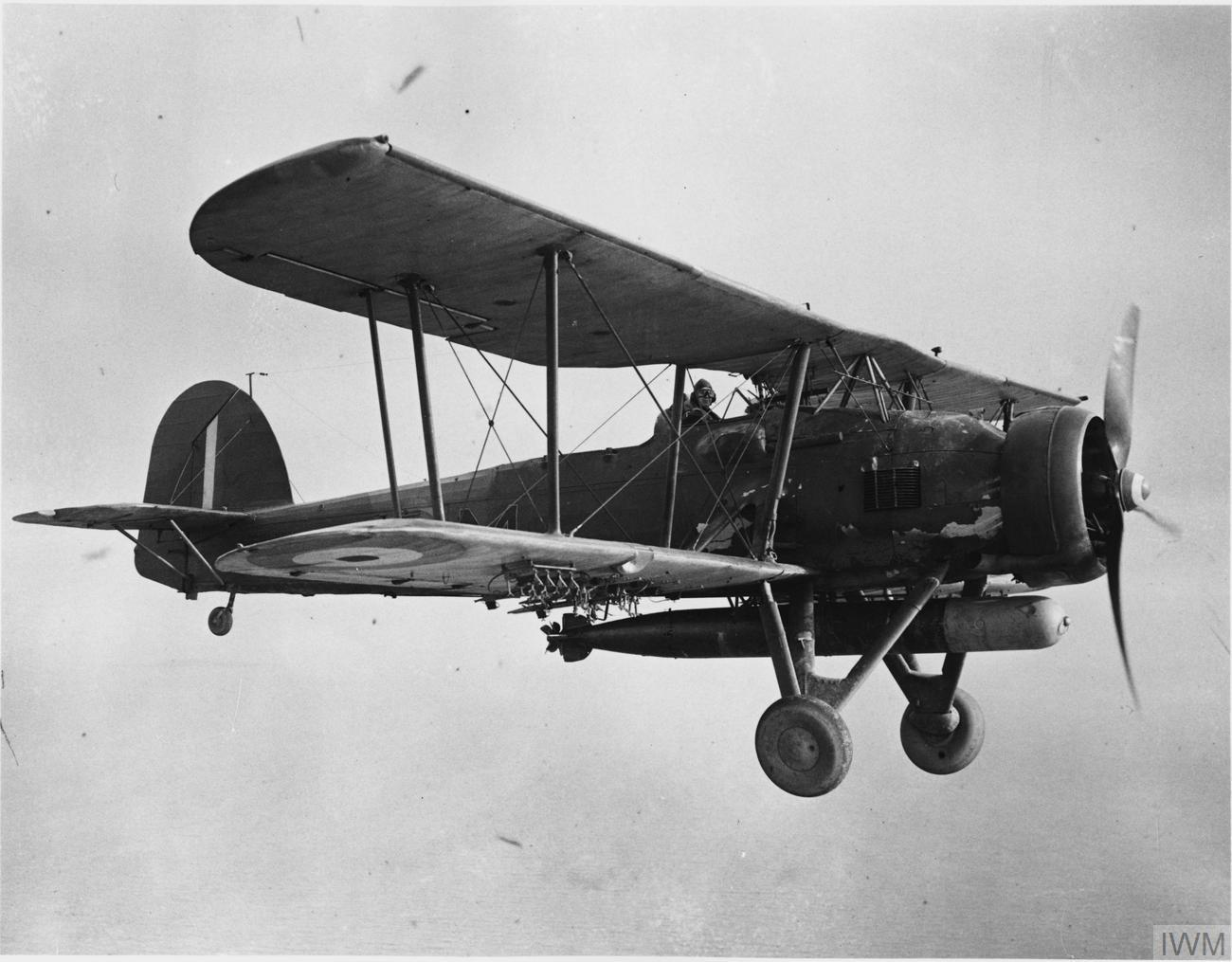
Fairey Swordfish

Two Fairey Swordfish starred in the 1960 film Sink the Bismarck!. Swordfish LS326 was marked as "5A" of 825 Naval Air Squadron, while NF389 was marked as LS423 / "5B".

Fairey Swordfish of the Royal Navy Fleet Air Arm are a central feature in the 2020 graphic novel The Stringbags written by Garth Ennis and illustrated by P J Holden. The story is about a reserve FFA crew who take part in the three most famous actions of the Swordfish during the Second World War including the attack on the Italian Fleet at Taranto in 1940, the attack on the Bismarck in 1941 and the Channel Dash in 1942.

=== Focke-Wulf Fw 190 ===
Focke-Wulf Fw 190s appear in the 1980 novel Betrayed Skies by Rudolf Braunburg which depicts a Luftwaffe fighter unit based in Poland in 1944.

Modified North American T-6 Texans portrayed Focke-Wulf Fw 190s in the 1977 film A Bridge Too Far.

=== Fokker Eindecker ===
A Fokker E.III Eindecker appeared in the BBC TV series Wings (1977–1978), a drama series about pilots of the Royal Flying Corps in the First World War.

=== Fokker Dr.I ===
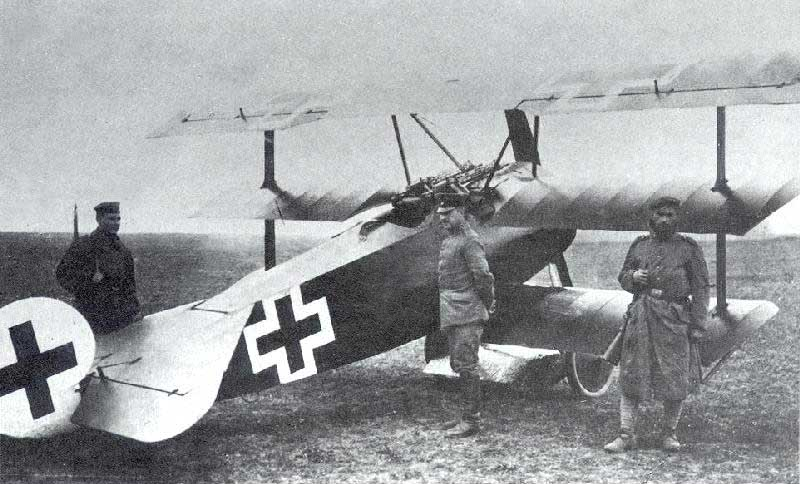
Fokker Dr.I

A Dr.I appears in the 1971 film Von Richthofen and Brown (released in the US as The Red Baron) which was directed by Roger Corman and starred John Phillip Law as the famous German ace. The aircraft makes its first appearance at a cocktail party thrown by the aircraft's designer Anthony Fokker (played by Hurd Hatfield) who shows off his creation to guest of honour Manfred von Richthofen (Law) but the latter's eyes are drawn more to Fokker's attractive mistress.

=== Ford Trimotor ===
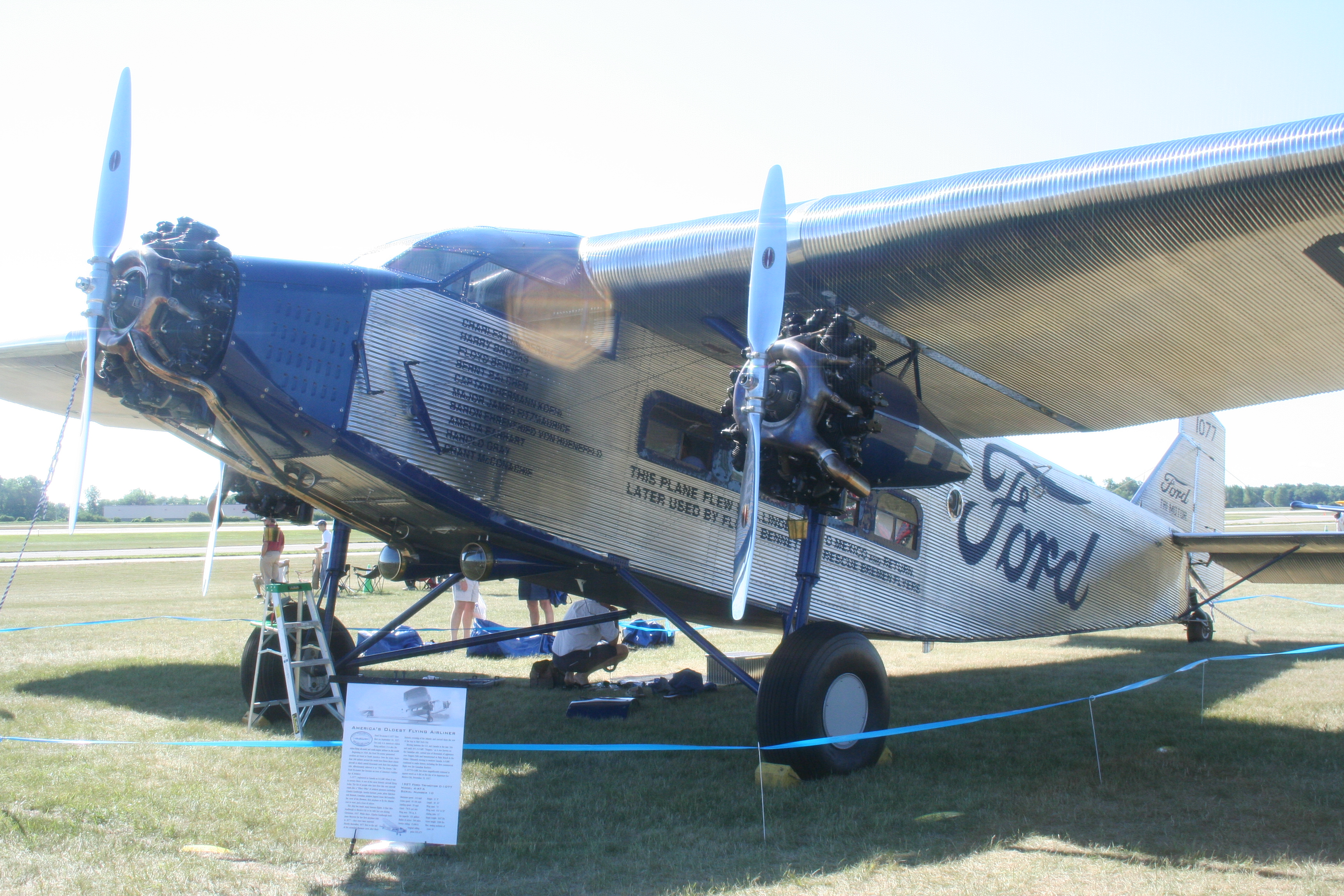
Ford Trimotor

John Wayne was depicted piloting a Ford Trimotor in several episodes of the 1932 serial film Hurricane Express. A Ford Trimotor appeared in Chapter 1 of Flash Gordon (Universal, 1936). Director Howard Hawks' 1939 film Only Angels Have Wings features a Trimotor that catches fire after a freak accident with a condor, eventually performing an emergency landing on an airfield. A real and a model Trimotor were used for the sequence.

A Ford Trimotor 4AT-B featured in the 2009 film Amelia, a biopic of aviator Amelia Earhart starring Hilary Swank and Richard Gere. The aircraft featured in the film belonged to the Golden Wings Museum, Minnesota.

== G ==
=== Gee Bee Racer ===
Two Gee Bee Model Z Super Sportster racing aircraft were featured in the 1991 Walt Disney film The Rocketeer.

Kermit Weeks, founder of Fantasy of Flight, used a Gee Bee Model Z as his main character "Zee" in a 2008 series of children's books set in the interwar period.

A Mexican Gee Bee Racer named "El Chupacabra" is one of the characters in the 2013 Disney animated film Planes.

=== Gloster Gladiator ===
Gloster Gladiators appear in the Second World War novel Signed with their Honour, written in 1942 by Australian author and war correspondent James Aldridge. The novel is set during the Axis invasion of Greece in 1940–41 and the central character is a British pilot named John Quayle who flies Gladiators with No. 80 Squadron RAF. An attempt in 1943 to make a film based on the novel was abandoned when two Gladiators were destroyed in a mid-air collision during the production.

=== Gloster Meteor ===
A privately owned Gloster Meteor TT20, N94749 appeared in the two-part 1976 episode, "The Feminum Mystique", of the first season of the Wonder Woman television series, as the experimental "XPJ-1" fighter which is stolen by the Nazis. This airframe has been donated to the Edwards Air Force Base Flight Test Center museum. The episode title was borrowed from Betty Friedan's 1963 book of a similar title, which is widely credited with sparking the beginning of second-wave feminism in the US.

A Gloster Meteor T.7, either WA634 or WA638, owned by Martin-Baker appeared in the episode "Many Happy Returns" of the 1967 British TV series The Prisoner.

=== Grumman TBF / TBM Avenger ===
The 1944 film Wing and a Prayer is the fictional account of a torpedo squadron equipped with Grumman TBF Avengers in early 1942. The movie culminates when the squadron fights at the Battle of Midway.

== H ==
=== HAL HF-24 Marut ===
The Bollywood war film Border is a fictionalized account of the 1971 Battle of Longewala between India and Pakistan. In the film a formation of HAL HF-24 Marut fighter-bombers of the Indian Air Force bomb Pakistani armoured ground forces consisting of 300 tanks and Armored Personnel Carriers.

=== Harrier family ===
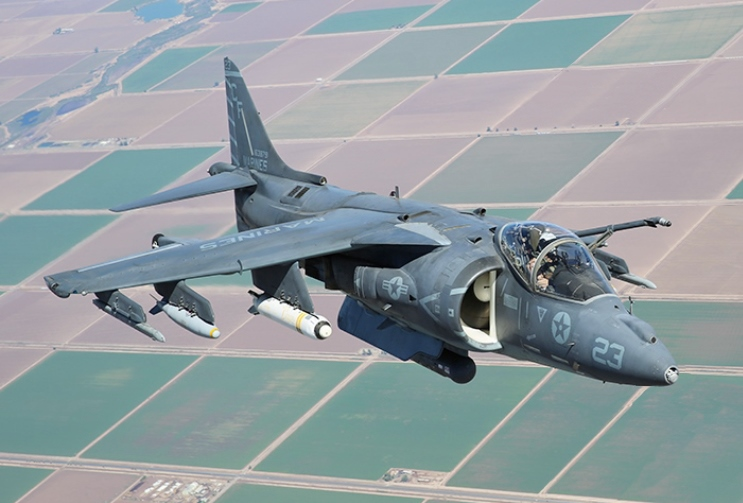
AV-8B Harrier II

A Royal Air Force Harrier was used by MI6 in the 1987 James Bond film The Living Daylights to smuggle KGB defector Georgi Koskov out of Austria.

The Harrier was one of the aircraft types featured in the short-lived 1982 BBC-TV series Squadron which was a drama about a fictional Royal Air Force unit, 373 Squadron. The unit was a Rapid Deployment Force and featured an unusual mix of aircraft including Harriers, C-130 Hercules and Puma helicopters. The series ran for ten episodes.

=== Handley Page Halifax ===
The novel A God in Ruins (2015) by Kate Atkinson features the Handley Page Halifax heavy bomber. The central character, Teddy Todd, is a Halifax pilot serving with RAF Bomber Command during WW2 and flies over 70 night-bombing missions over Germany.

=== Hawker Hunter ===
The music video for the 2000 electronica single "Sunset (Bird of Prey)" by Fatboy Slim features a Hawker Hunter trainer in U.S. Air Force livery, as the titular "Bird of Prey".

=== Hawker Hurricane ===
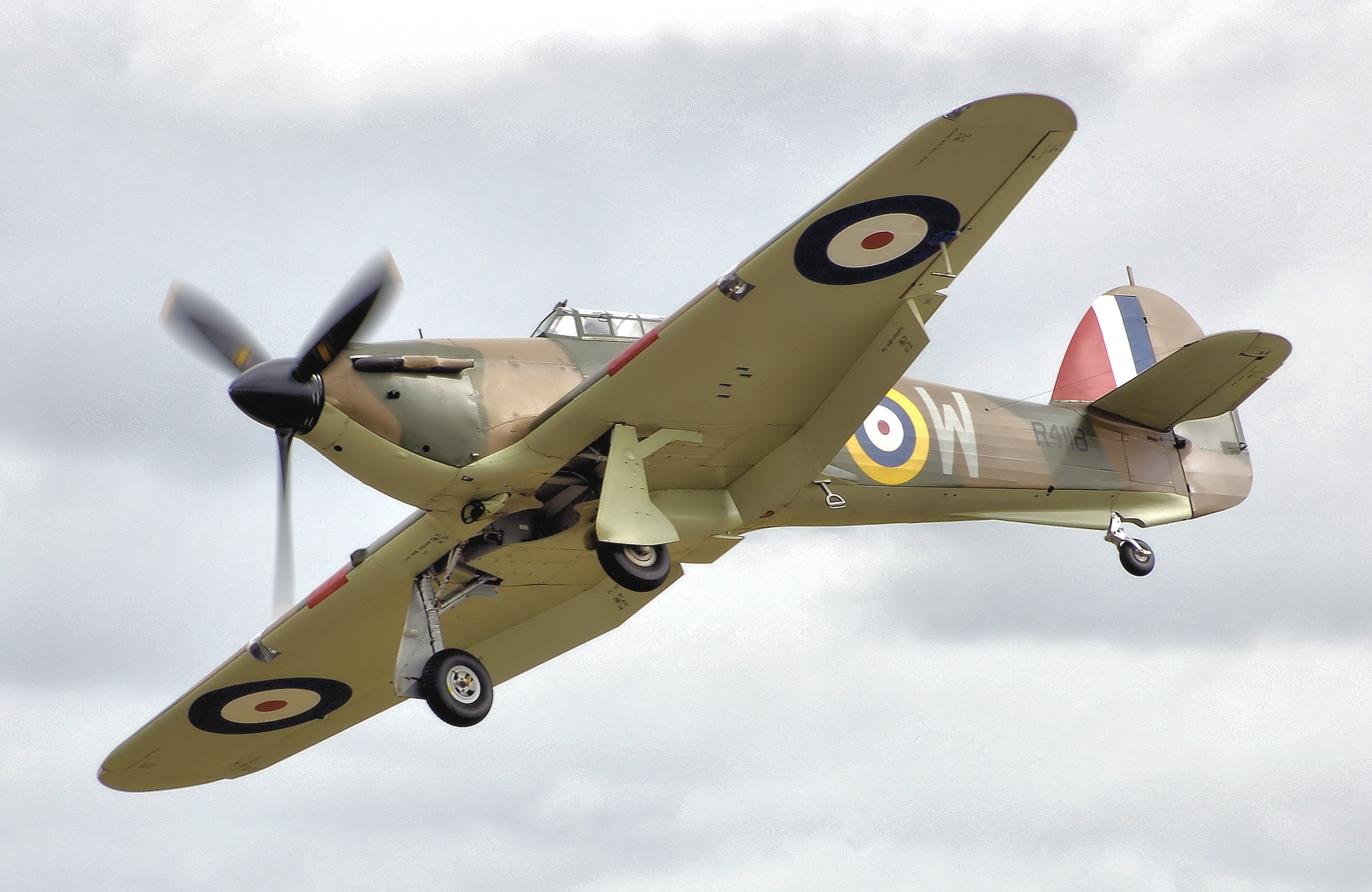
Hawker Hurricane Mk.I

A number of Hawker Hurricanes, including the last one built, registered G-AMAU, "The Last of the Many", and five provided by the Portuguese Air Force, which flew the type until mid-1954, were used in the making of the Templar Productions Ltd. production provisionally titled "Hawks in the Sun", based on the book What Are Your Angels Now? by Wing Commander A. J. C. Pelham Groom, then released in March 1952 as Angels One Five.

The Hawker Hurricane Mk. I is the aircraft for the fictional RAF pilots depicted in the 1983 novel Piece of Cake by Derek Robinson. The 1988 miniseries based on the novel used Supermarine Spitfires instead of Hurricanes.

=== Heinkel He 111 ===
The Heinkel He 111 has a prominent role in the 1969 film Battle of Britain.

=== Hindenburg ===
The Zeppelin LZ 129 Hindenburg was the subject of the 1975 film The Hindenburg, which speculated sabotage as the cause of the 1937 disaster at Naval Air Station Lakehurst, New Jersey. The studio model of the airship is now displayed in the Smithsonian Institution's National Air and Space Museum in Washington, D.C.

=== Hispano Aviación HA-1112 ===
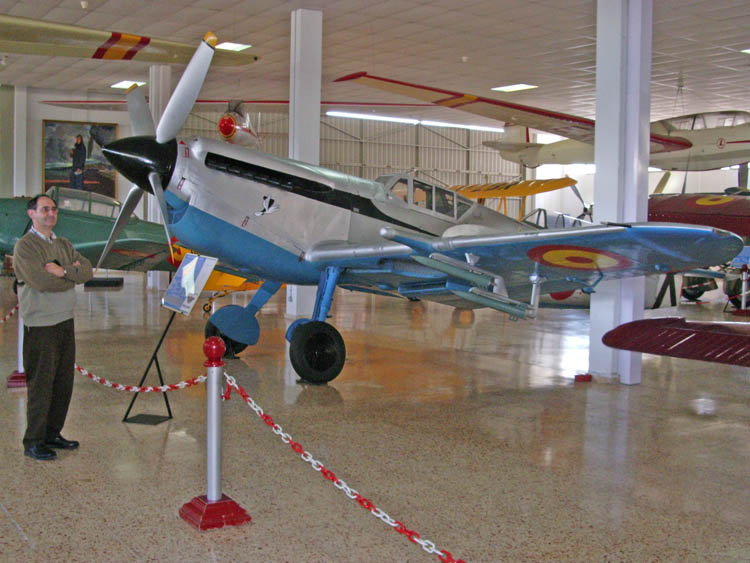
Hispano Aviación Ha 1112 Buchón

Twenty-eight former Spanish Air Force Hispano Aviación HA-1112s were used in the 1969 film Battle of Britain as "stand-ins" to depict Messerschmitt Bf 109 fighters of the Luftwaffe, These aircraft included 27 single-seat M1Ls and one two-seat M4L. Eighteen were flown, six could taxi, the rest used to dress sets. In the mid-1960s at the time aircraft began to be collected for the film to be made, the only genuine Bf 109s known to exist were unairworthy examples in museums such as the Imperial War Museum and the South African National Museum of Military History or in private hands; whereas the HA-1112 was just being retired from service with the Spanish Air Force and several airframes in flyable condition and some 50 dismantled Buchóns were up for disposal bid. The four airframes acquired by the Confederate Air Force just prior to the start of filming "were the first Buchóns in truly civilian ownership, early members of the fledgling warbird preservation movement."

Several Buchóns were painted in RAF markings for the 1969 Italian "macaroni combat" war film Eagles Over London, also known as Battle Squadron and Battle Command (Italian: La battaglia d'Inghilterra), directed by Enzo G. Castellari. "In 1979, much of the footage shot for Eagles Over London appeared in the dire George Peppard film Hell to Victory".

Three of the Buchóns were "hastily converted into P-51B Mustangs for the 1970 film Patton. This involved the attachment of a large Mustang-esque fibreglass air intake to the underside of the fuselage."

One CAF Buchón flew as a Bf 109B in Condor Legion markings for the film The Hindenburg which began filming in August 1974.

One Buchón, which had taxied in The Battle of Britain, flew in the 1988 LWT miniseries Piece of Cake, and was one of three flyable HA-1112s used to depict Bf 109s in the 1990 film Memphis Belle. The Piece of Cake Buchón also appeared in the 1991 ITV television miniseries A Perfect Hero.

A Buchón now with the Planes of Fame Air Museum, Chino, California, is under repair after a landing accident at Lydd in Kent during filming of the 2001 film Pearl Harbor in 2000.

A former training airframe that did not appear in the Battle of Britain but which was restored to Bf 109G-10 standard in the early 1990s, and operated by the Old Flying Machine Company, appeared in the 1995 telemovie Over Here starring Martin Clunes.

A Buchon appears in the 2017 Christopher Nolan film Dunkirk.

=== Hughes H-4 Hercules (Spruce Goose) ===
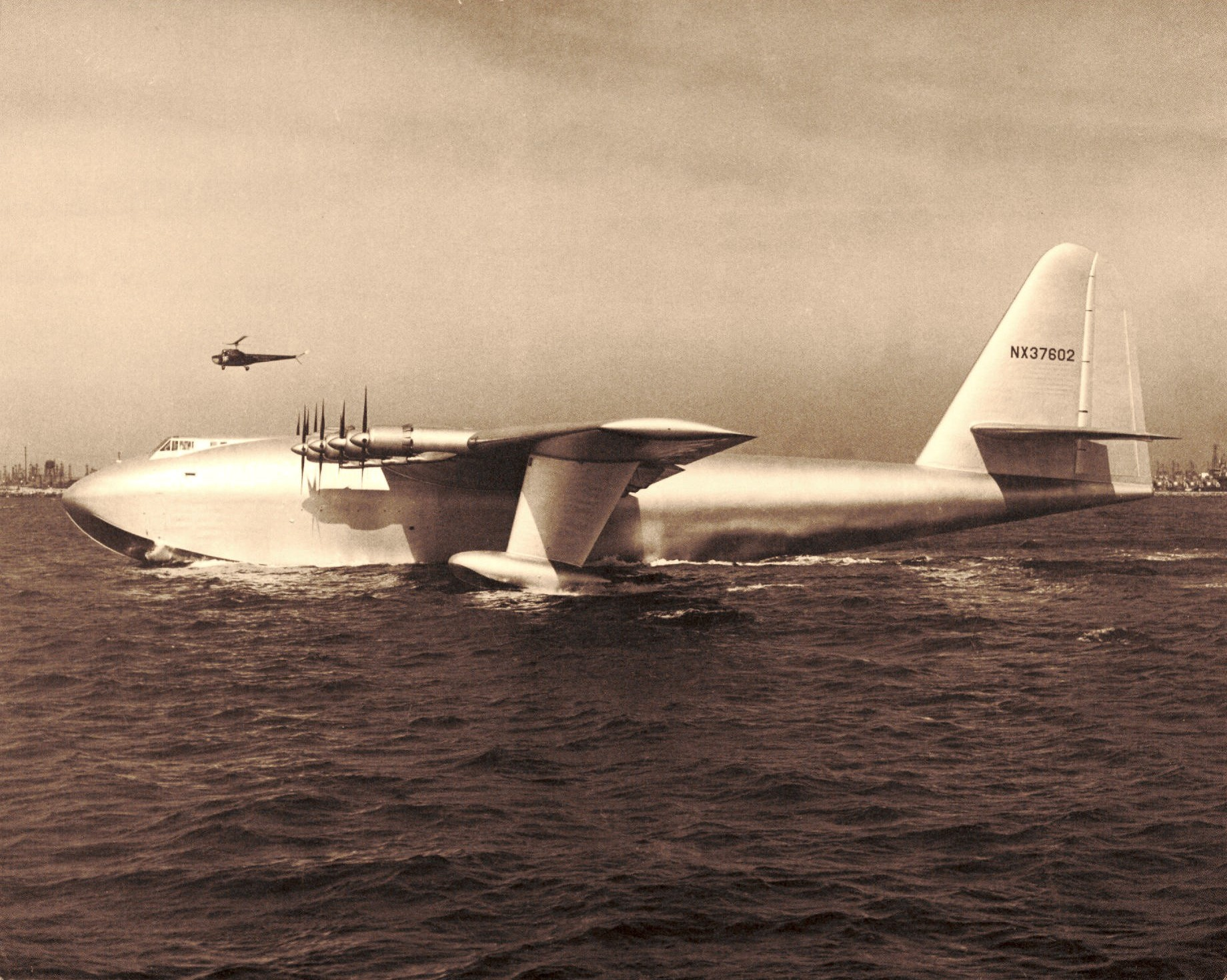
The sole Hughes H-4 Hercules

The Hughes H-4 Hercules, also known as the Hercules HK-1 and "The Spruce Goose", is a large flying boat which has made a number of appearances in fiction. The aircraft was central to the plot of the 1987 Hanna-Barbera animated film Yogi Bear and the Magical Flight of the Spruce Goose.

In the 1988 biopic Tucker: The Man and His Dream, a pivotal meeting between automaker Preston Tucker and Howard Hughes takes place in front of the Hercules, within its hangar, where Hughes briefly tells Tucker that whether the Hercules flies is not the point, as well as how to circumvent the "establishment" and Senator Ferguson.

In the 1991 adventure film The Rocketeer, hero Cliff Secord uses a large-scale model of the Hughes H-4 Hercules to escape some eager federal agents and Howard Hughes himself. After Secord glides the model to safety, Hughes expresses relief that the craft would actually fly.

== J ==
=== JF-17 Thunder ===
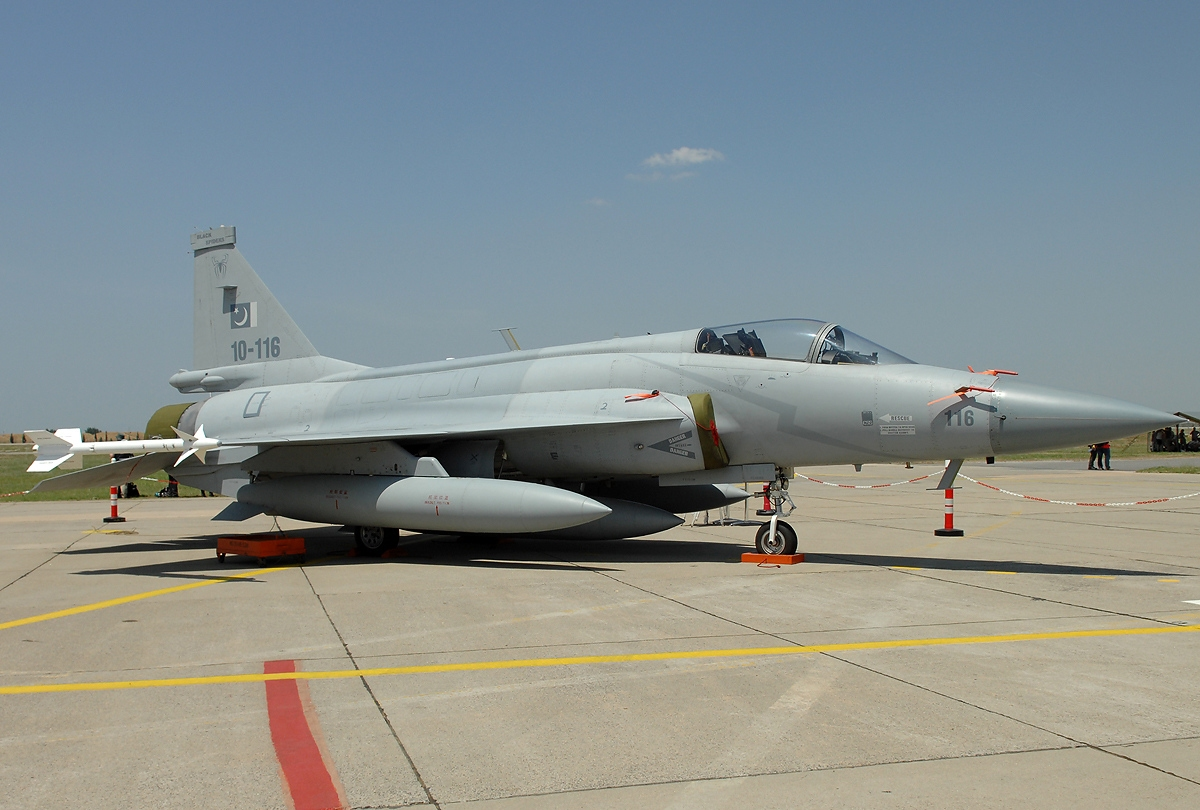
Pakistan Air Force JF-17

The 2019 Pakistani war action film Sherdil heavily features the formidable JF-17 Thunder. Serving as the primary fighter for the protagonist, Flight Lieutenant Haris Mustafa, the indigenously built jet takes center stage. The movie’s high-stakes aerial combat sequences prominently showcase the multi-role fighter against Indian aircraft, highlighting its critical role in Pakistan’s modern defense capabilities.

=== Junkers Ju 52/3m ===
A Ju-52 appears in the 1973 novel Band of Brothers by Ernest K. Gann in which an abandoned example is resurrected and flown on two engines by a team of pilots.

Two Ju 52s appeared in one of the early scenes in the 2008 Second World War film Valkyrie directed by Bryan Singer and starring Tom Cruise. One aircraft was painted in a Luftwaffe scheme, the other in an all-silver finish.

In the second season of the television series Babylon Berlin, characters Gereon Rath and Reinhold Gräf use a Ju 52 to inspect the then-secret German-operated Lipetsk fighter-pilot school in the Soviet Union. The appearance is anachronistic, as the episode takes place before the aircraft entered production.

=== Junkers Ju 87 ===
The 1941 Nazi propaganda film Stukas, produced by Karl Ritter, described the wartime exploits of a squadron of Junkers Ju 87 "Stuka" dive bombers and their pilots during the Invasion of France during World War II.

== K ==
=== Kellett K-3 Autogyro ===
In the 1934 screwball comedy It Happened One Night, the foppish bridegroom "King" Westley (Jameson Thomas) arrives at his own wedding "piloting" a Kellett Autogiro Corporation K-3 autogyro, c/n 16, NC12691, (although the real pilot can be seen crouching in the cockpit after Westley deplanes). The same autogyro appeared in the 1933 W. C. Fields film International House.

== L ==
=== L-5 Sentinel ===
A Stinson L-5 Sentinel was shown in the 1969 Mike Nichols film Catch-22 as the aircraft that a pilot commits suicide in after accidentally killing another squadron member with his propeller. The title of Joseph Heller's 1961 satirical novel of the same name has entered the lexicon.

=== Lockheed Constellation ===
Lockheed Constellations of Trans World Airlines were depicted in the 2004 Martin Scorsese film The Aviator. The preserved Super Constellation, "Star of America", N6937C, of the Airline History Museum was filmed at San Bernardino International Airport, California, for this Howard Hughes biopic. A fleet of grounded Connies was rendered in CGI.

The same aircraft (N6937C) was also used in the 1992 film Voyager which starred Sam Shepard and was directed by Volker Schlöndorff.

=== Lockheed P-80/F-80 Shooting Star ===
Lockheed F-80 Shooting Stars appear in the 1953 novel Troubling of a Star by Walt Sheldon which portrayed a USAF unit stationed in occupied Japan during the Korean War.

=== Lockheed Model 12 Electra Junior ===
A Lockheed Model 12 Electra Junior, registration NC17342 appears in the 1940 film Flight Angels as an experimental aircraft called the "Stratosphere". This particular aircraft also appears in the films Rosalie, Nick Carter, Master Detective, Secret Service of the Air, and Murder Over New York.

A Model 12 Electra Junior appeared as the French airliner in the climactic final scene from the 1942 film Casablanca (the aircraft carries the Air France seahorse logo, although Air France did not operate the type). A "cut-out" stood in for a real aircraft in many shots.

A pair of restored Lockheed Model 12 Electra Juniors was used in the filming of the 2009 movie Amelia, a biopic of aviator Amelia Earhart which starred Hilary Swank and Richard Gere. One of the aircraft was repainted to resemble a Lockheed Model 10 which was the aircraft in which Earhart and her navigator Fred Noonan were flying when they disappeared in 1937. The owner and restorer of the latter aircraft, pilot Joe Sheppard, flew the plane during filming and he had to shave off his moustache and wear a wig to resemble Swank.

=== Lockheed Hudson ===
Lockheed Hudsons appeared in the films A Yank in the R.A.F. (1941) and Captains of the Clouds (1942)

Lockheed Hudsons appeared in the 2006 Canadian Broadcasting Corporation (CBC) mini-series Above and Beyond which portrayed the work of the Atlantic Ferry Organisation in flying military aircraft across the North Atlantic from Canada to deliver them to the RAF in Great Britain during the Second World War. An actual Hudson appeared in the series along with a number of others recreated with CGI.

=== Lockheed L-1011 TriStar ===
Several Lockheed L-1011 TriStars were depicted in the 1990 action film Die Hard 2, with two large models constructed by Industrial Light and Magic "flown" on wires for the cameras through "storm clouds" made of non-toxic vaporized mineral oil. Filming was done at a remote airstrip in the Mojave Desert in California. Whipped by the Santa Ana winds coming through the Tehachapi Pass into the valley, the smoke effect contributed convincing heavy weather to the shots.

The Lockheed L-1011 Tristar appears in the 1992 film Passenger 57 as the location of a terrorist hijacking. The aircraft, registration N330EA, was formerly operated commercially by Eastern Airlines and was painted in the livery of the fictional airline Atlantic International for the film.

=== Lockheed SR-71 Blackbird ===
In Payne Harrison's 1990 novel Storming Intrepid, the US deploys an SR-71 Blackbird over the USSR on an ELINT mission to record communications between the hijacked shuttle Intrepid and Soviet commanders on the ground. The Soviet air defenses attempt to shoot down the aircraft as it tries to get out of Soviet airspace. The aircraft briefly flames out, but successfully recovers and narrowly escapes a missile trap by Mikoyan MiG-31 interceptors.

=== Lockheed U-2 ===
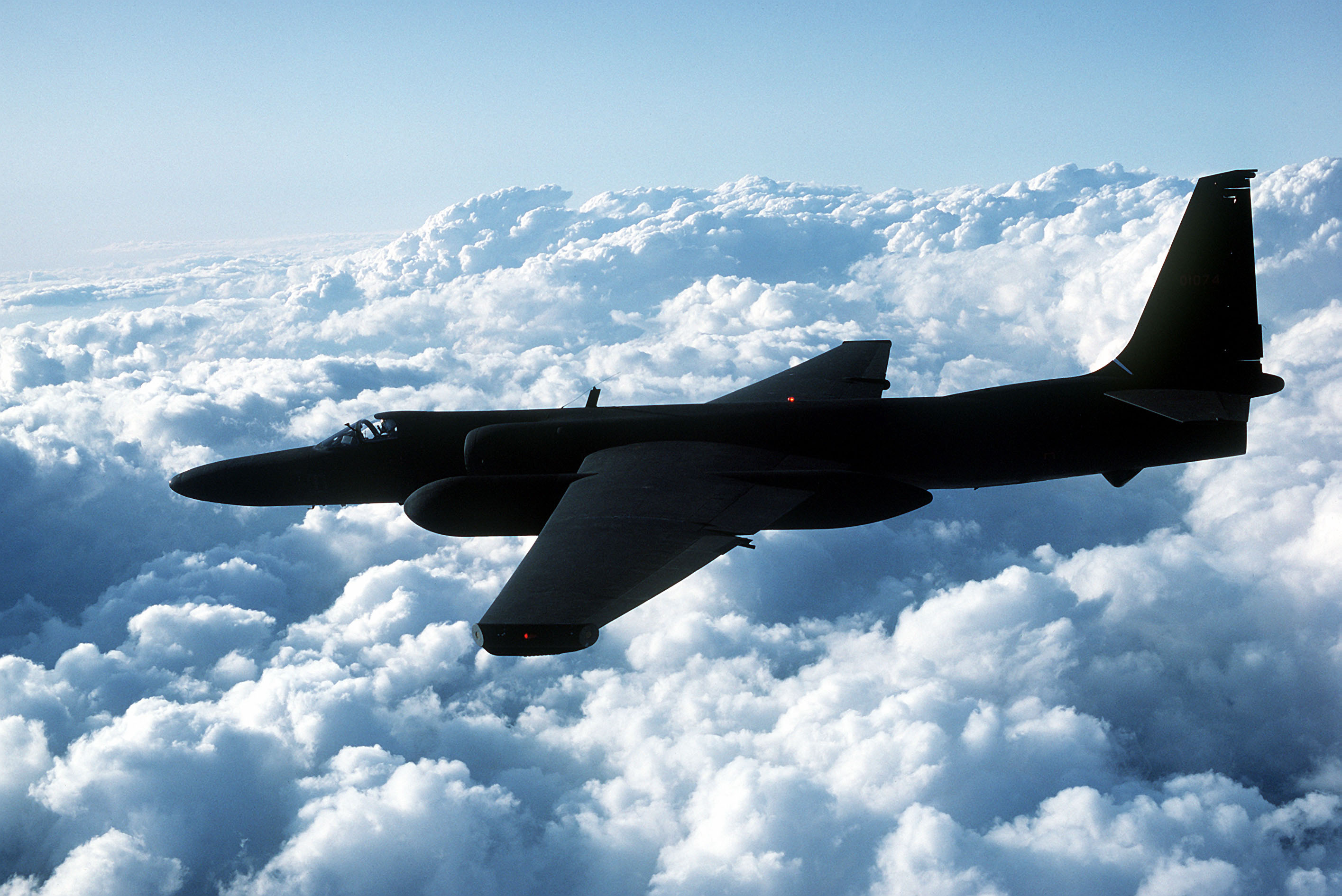
Lockheed U-2

In 2015, Steven Spielberg's film Bridge of Spies recreated the 1960 events of a Lockheed U-2 piloted by Francis Gary Powers being shot down while on a reconnaissance mission over the Soviet Union.

In the 1980s television series Call to Glory, the U-2 was the "main ride" of U.S. Air Force Colonel Raynor Sarnac from the October 1962 Cuba Crisis to 1979.

=== Lockheed Vega ===
A Lockheed Vega DL-1B Special, one of only two that remain in flying condition, was used in the 1976 television miniseries Amelia Earhart, starring Susan Clark as Earhart.

A Stinson Reliant stood in for Lockheed Vega DL-1 Special, G-ABGK, c/n 155, Puck, race number 36, in the 1991 Australian mini-series The Great Air Race, about the 1934 London to Melbourne MacRobertson Trophy Air Race. It is also known as Half a World Away.

== M ==
=== Martin MB-2 ===
The 1927 William Wellman film Wings featured Martin MB-2s among many types depicting World War I aircraft.

=== McDonnell Douglas DC-10 ===
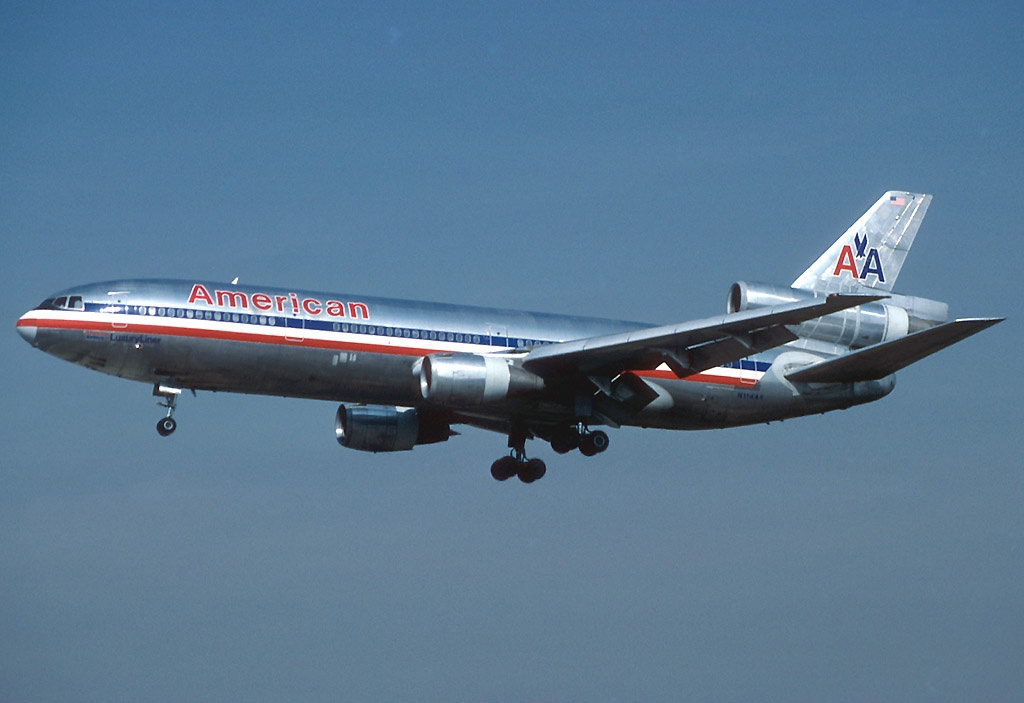
MD DC-10

In Michael Crichton's Airframe, one of the characters uses the crash of American Airlines Flight 191 which involved a DC-10 to describe how a highly publicized accident can destroy a good airplane's reputation because "a media industry that has grown hostile and shallow with the ascendancy of television always jumps to the wrong conclusion."

=== Messerschmitt Bf 108 ===
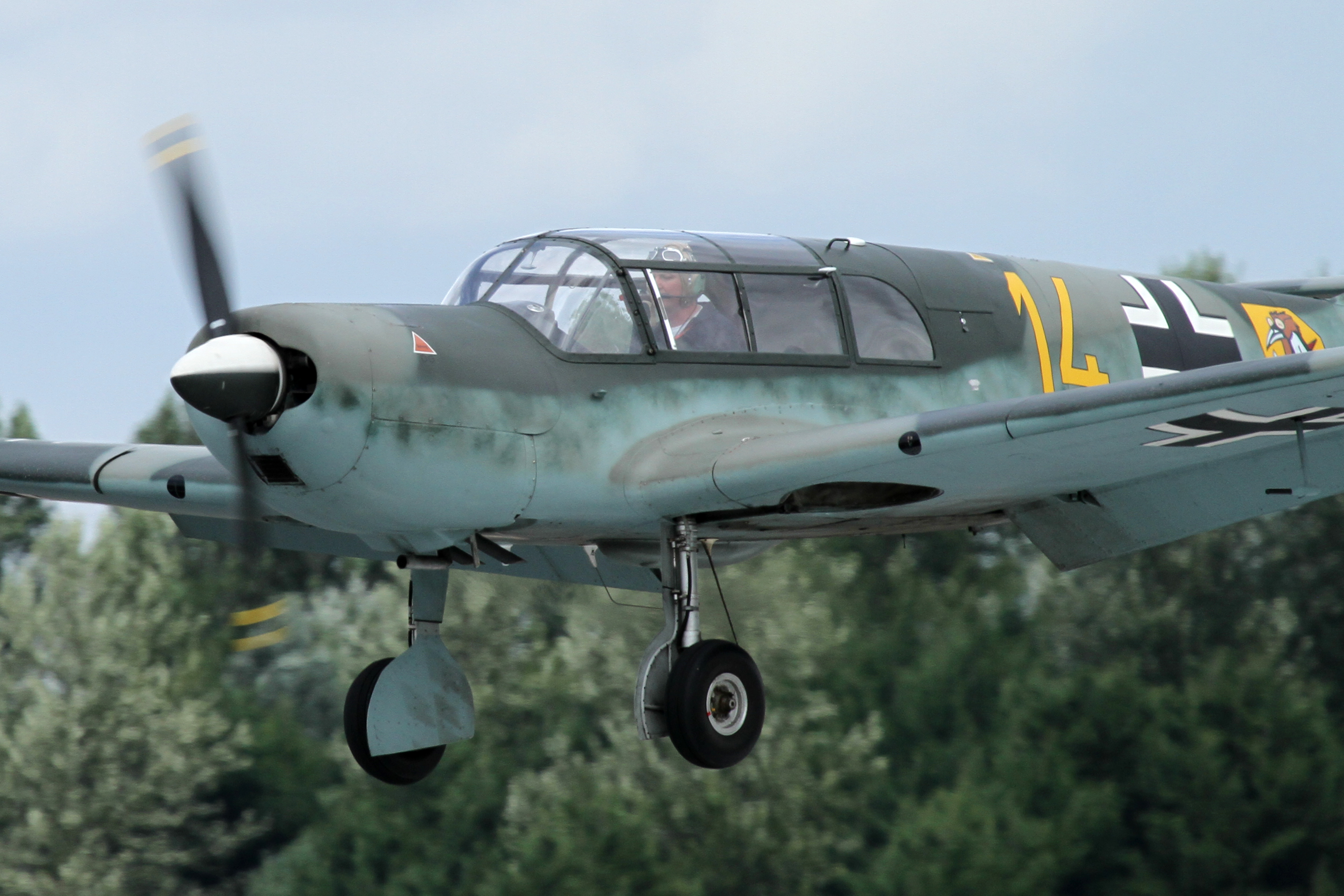
Messerschmitt Bf 108

Two Messerschmitt Bf 108 Taifuns substituted for unavailable Luftwaffe fighters again in the 1964 film 633 Squadron.

=== Messerschmitt Bf 109 ===
27 Spanish Hispano Aviación HA-1112 M1L 'Buchon' single-engined fighters, Messerschmitt Bf 109s built under license in Spain, were used in the 1969 film Battle of Britain. The Buchons were altered to look more like correct Bf 109Es, adding mock machine guns and cannon, redundant tailplane struts, and removing the rounded wingtips.

=== Messerschmitt Bf 110 ===
A Messerschmitt Bf 110 appears in the 1952 British war film Angels One Five. The Messerschmitt used in the film was a captured Bf-110G-4 which was later scrapped after filming.

=== Mikoyan-Gurevich MiG-15 ===
A flyable Mikoyan-Gurevich MiG-15 appears in the 2022 Korean War drama film Devotion.

=== Mikoyan-Gurevich MiG-21 ===
Prior to its retirement with the Indian Air Force, the Mikoyan-Gurevich MiG-21 appeared in 2025 film Peace and War.

=== Mil Mi-8/-17 ===
Mi-8s appear in the 2019 HBO mini-series Chernobyl. Mi-8s were among the Soviet helicopters used to firefight and monitor the exploded reactor in 1986.

=== Mil Mi-26 ===
In the 2013 Bruce Willis action film A Good Day to Die Hard, a Mil Mi-26T, leased from the Belarus Ministry for Emergency Situations and painted in washable military camouflage, was used in various scenes.

=== Miles Falcon ===
For the 1991 Australian mini-series The Great Air Race, about the 1934 London to Melbourne MacRobertson Trophy Air Race, also known as Half a World Away, Miles Falcon, VH-AAT, played Miles M.3 Falcon, G-ACTM, the prototype fitted with extra fuel tanks, race number 31.

=== Mitsubishi A5M ===
The Mitsubishi A5M Type 96 fighter, known to the Allies as the "Claude", features prominently in the 2013 Studio Ghibli animated feature The Wind Rises directed by Hayao Miyazaki. The film is a semi-fictionalised lyrical portrayal of Japanese aircraft designer Jiro Horikoshi and depicts him designing the A5M in the 1930s.

=== Moller M400 Skycar ===
The Moller M400 Skycar appears in the 2010 telemovie The Jensen Project with LeVar Burton and Kellie Martin.

=== Morane-Saulnier MS.230 ===
The Morane-Saulnier MS.230 appears as the fictional "new monoplane" in the 1966 World War I epic The Blue Max and was the aircraft in which the central character Bruno Stachel (George Peppard) meets his demise. Peppard purchased the aircraft and took it back to the US where it joined the collection of the San Diego Aerospace Museum. The plot, which has Stachel wringing-out a new design until it sheds its wings, is based on the experience with the late-war Fokker E.V, a parasol design, three of six of which crashed within a week of being delivered to Jasta 6 in August 1918. Grounded for investigation, the problem was traced to shoddy workmanship at the Mecklenburg factory where defective wood spars, water damage to glued parts, and pins carelessly splintering the members instead of securing them were discovered. Upon return to service two months later, the design was renamed the Fokker D.VIII in an effort to avoid the type's reputation as a killer.

== N ==
=== Nakajima Ki-27 ===
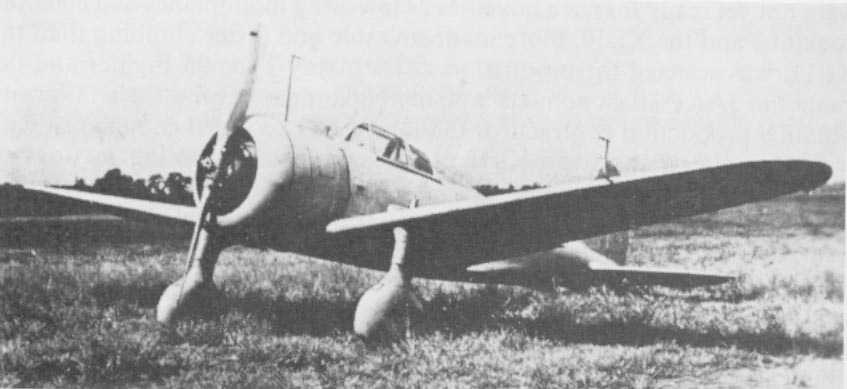
Nakajima Ki-27

Nakajima Ki-27s, lifted from Japanese film, appeared in the 1942 Republic film Flying Tigers.

=== Nakajima Ki-43 ===
A replica of a Nakajima Ki-43 Hayabusa appeared in the 2007 Japanese motion picture For Those We Love, a drama about WW2 Kamikaze pilots.

=== Nieuport 17 ===
The Nieuport 17 was one of the main aircraft in the 2006 film Flyboys.

=== Nieuport 28 ===
An authentic Nieuport 28 was provided and flown by Frank Tallman, a Hollywood film pilot, for The Twilight Zone episode "The Last Flight" in which a World War I Royal Flying Corps pilot is transported in time in a cloud to the 1960s. Norton Air Force Base, California, was the filming site. The episode first aired on 5 February 1960.

=== Noorduyn Norseman ===
The Noorduyn Norseman appears in scenes in the 1942 Warner Bros. film Captains of the Clouds, with James Cagney as a Canadian bush pilot at the start of World War II.

=== North American A-5 Vigilante ===
The 1994 Stephen Coonts novel The Intruders mentions the North American A-5 Vigilante where the main character Jake Grafton described it as the most beautiful airplane the navy owned and regarded the Vigie pilots were supermen, the best of the best.

=== North American AT-6 Texan ===
An SNJ-5 Texan, a naval variant of the North American T-6 Texan, appeared in several television productions. It was modified to play the role of a Japanese Zero in the TV series Baa Baa Black Sheep (1977) and the mini-series Pearl (1979) and it played the roles of both a Zero and an SBD Dauntless in the 1987 mini-series War and Remembrance. T-6 Texans, one piloted by World War Two Marine Ace Archie Donahue represented Japanese Zeroes in the 1980 science fiction film The Final Countdown. North American Harvards, the British Commonwealth name for the AT-6, appear prominently in Captains of the Clouds, starring James Cagney.

=== North American X-15 ===
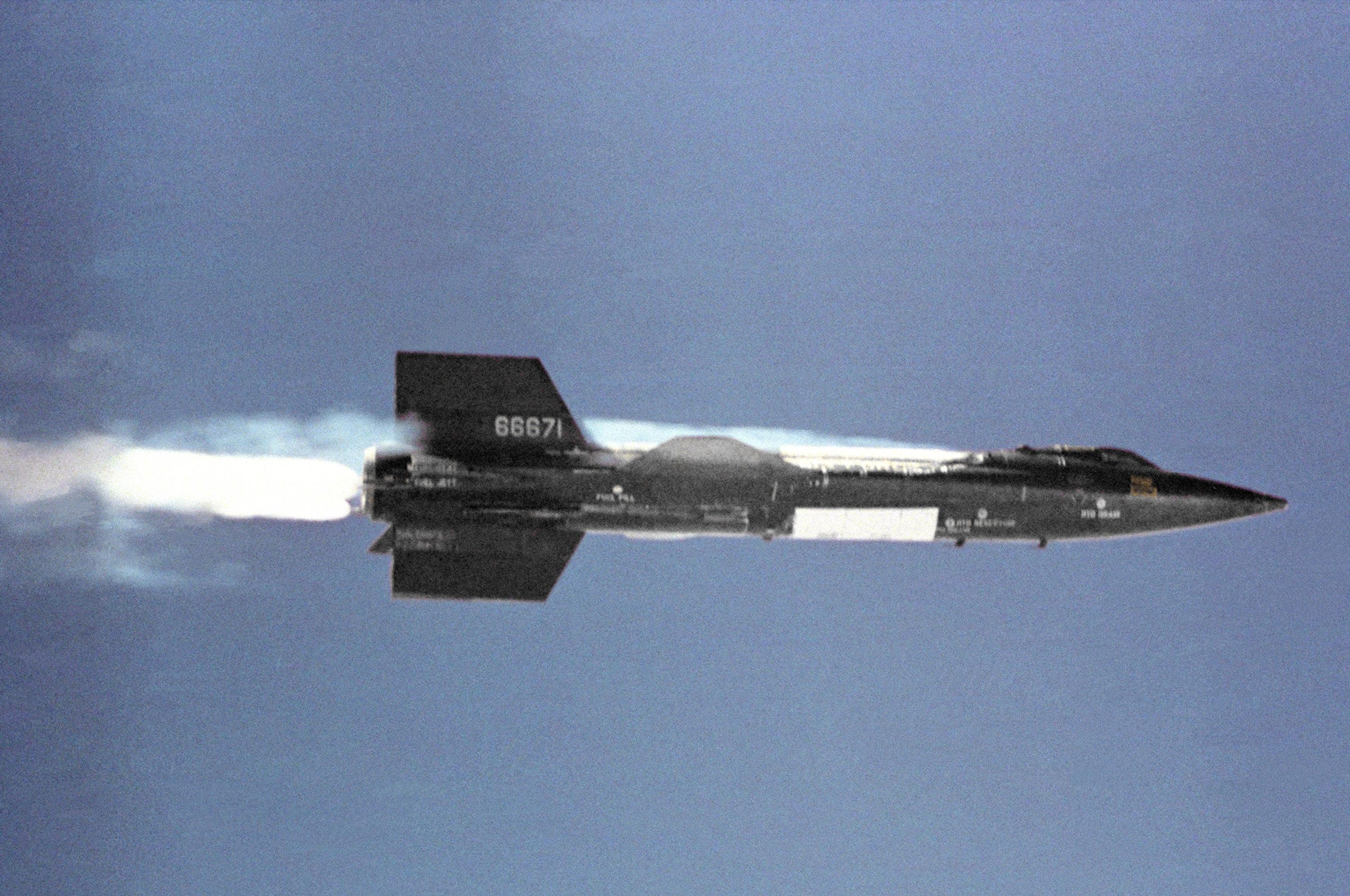
North American X-15

On 5 November 1959, a small engine fire forced pilot Scott Crossfield to make an emergency landing on Rosamond Dry Lake, Edwards Air Force Base, California, in a North American X-15. Not designed to land with fuel on board, the X-15 landed with a heavy load of propellants and broke its back, grounding it for three months. Footage of this accident was later incorporated in The Outer Limits, episode "The Premonition", first aired 9 January 1965.

The rocket craft is also the subject of the 1961 Essex Productions film X-15, a fictionalized account of the program, directed by Richard Donner in his first outing, and narrated by USAF Brigadier General (Reserve) James Stewart in an uncredited role.

The X-15 is portrayed as the FFE Space Fighter (宇宙戦闘機 Uchū Sentōki, lit. Space Fighter) armed with atomic heat cannons to fight the Natarl UFOs in the 1959 movie Battle in Outer Space.

In the opening scene of the 2018 film First Man, Neil Armstrong, played by Ryan Gosling, pilots a North American X-15 during a test flight.

=== Northrop M2-F2 ===
The Northrop M2-F2, a NASA research aircraft, appears in the 1970s TV series The Six Million Dollar Man, starring Lee Majors. In the first episode, protagonist Steve Austin crashes the aircraft during a test flight and is severely injured. The footage used was from a real M2-F2 accident that took place on 10 May 1967 in the California desert. The clip of the crash was also used in the opening titles of each episode. The opening titles also used footage of the later Northrop HL-10 aircraft.

=== Northrop YB-49 ===
Paramount Pictures' 1953 film, The War of the Worlds incorporates color footage of a Northrop YB-49 test flight, originally used in one of Paramount's Popular Science theatrical shorts. In the George Pal film, the Flying Wing is used to drop an atomic bomb on the invading Martians.

=== Northrop Grumman E-2 Hawkeye ===
In the film The Final Countdown (1980) a Grumman E-2 Hawkeye is used by USS Nimitz as an airborne command and radar facility to track the Japanese Fleet heading to attack Pearl Harbor.

In the 2022 film Top Gun: Maverick, the E-2 plays an important role in the topical air attack operation, conducting the strike pack (consisting of four F/A-18s) and detecting enemy aircraft.

== O ==
=== O2C Helldiver ===
O2C-2 Helldivers appear In the 2005 King Kong remake. Director Peter Jackson plays one of the gunners while the pilot is portrayed by Rick Baker, who played Kong (in a rubber suit) in the 1976 remake.

== P ==
=== P-1 Hawk ===
The 1927 William Wellman film Wings featured Curtiss P-1 Hawks among many types depicting World War I aircraft. The P-1s were used to portray German Albatros D.V fighters.

=== P-38 Lightning ===
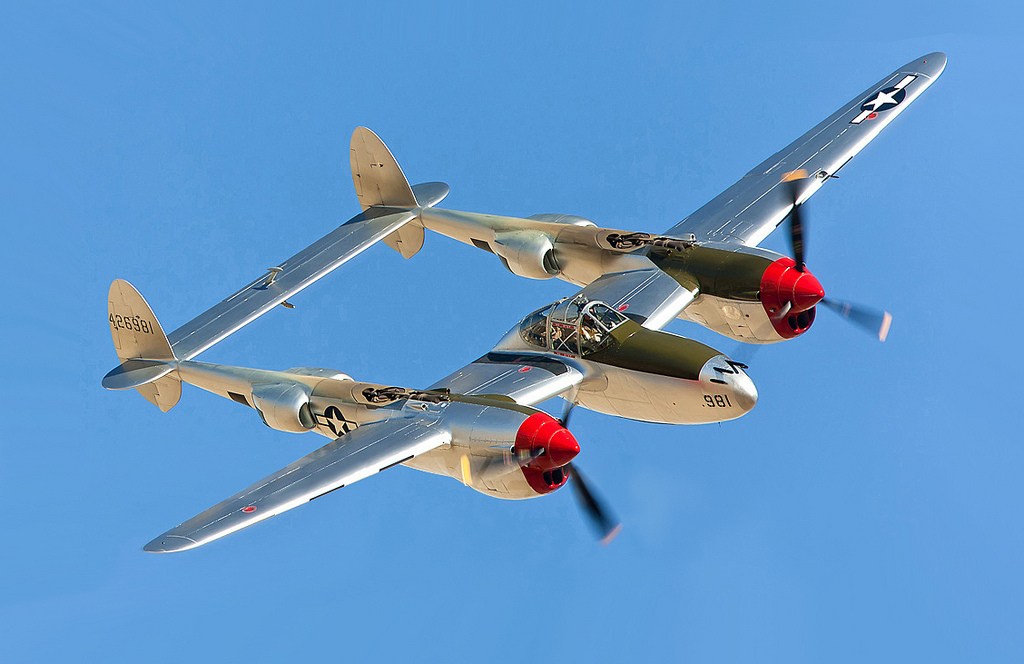
Lockheed P-38 Lightning

A Guy Named Joe (1943) has Spencer Tracy returning as a guiding spirit looking after young Lockheed P-38 Lightning pilot Van Johnson.

The 1965 film Von Ryan's Express begins with main protagonist, USAAF Colonel Joseph Ryan (Frank Sinatra), crash landing a P-38 Lightning in World War II Italy and being held as a prisoner of war.

P-38s appear in the 1968 novel Order of Battle by Alfred Coppel, a work that portrays US P-38Fs in the fighter-bomber role over Europe in WW2.

In the 1992 action film Aces: Iron Eagle III, the main character, Brig. Gen. Chappy Sinclair (Louis Gossett Jr.), pilots a P-38J as part of a mission to field old Second World War airshow aircraft against a drug cartel in Peru.

=== P-40 Warhawk ===
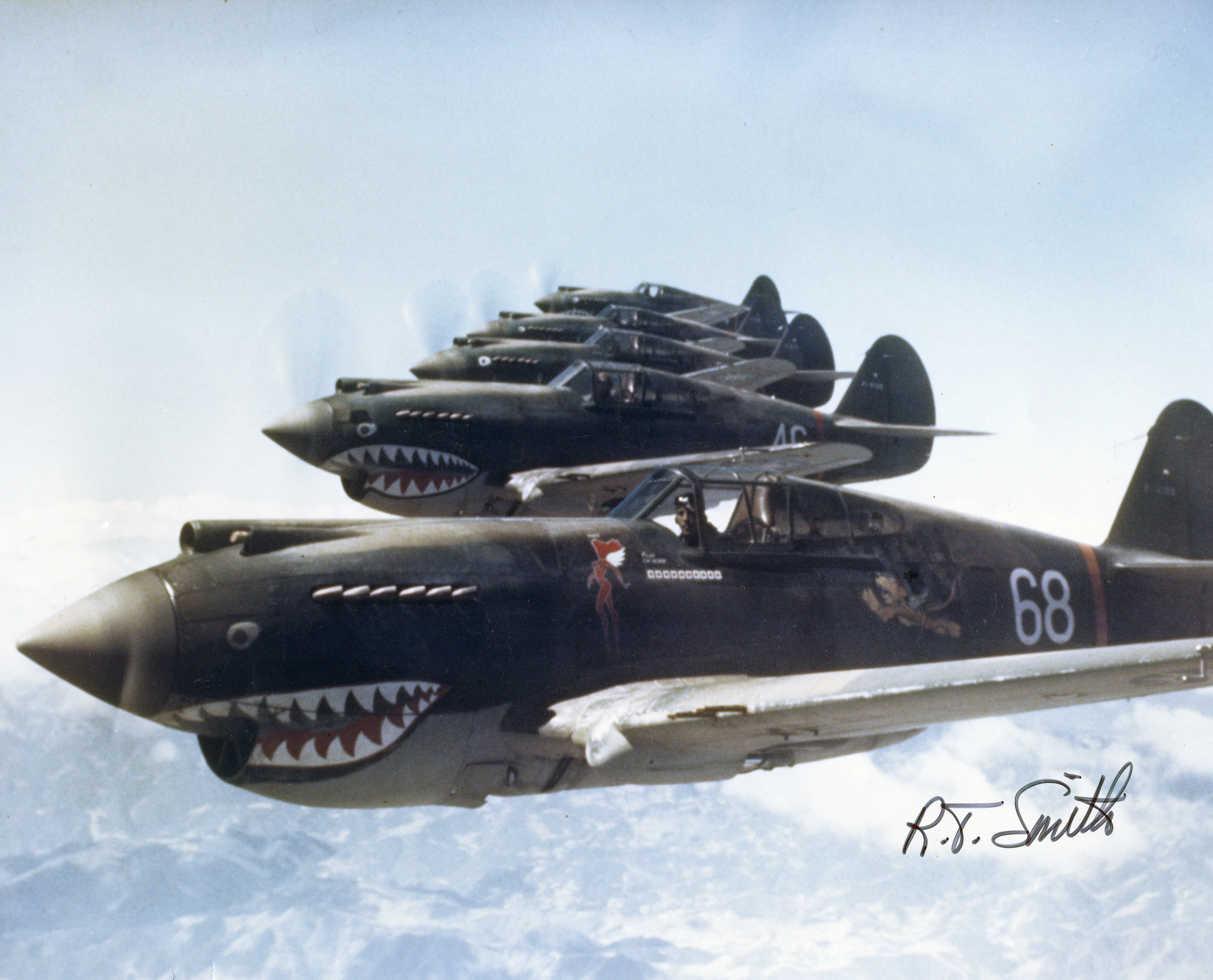
Curtiss P-40 Warhawks

In the 1942 John Wayne film Flying Tigers, real Curtiss P-40 Warhawks are featured. The New York Times critic called the P-40s "the true stars" of the film. Republic Studios also built replicas for the film due to material shortages during the war. These can be identified by the fairings hiding the cylinder heads of the automotive V-8 engines installed in them, and the lack of elevators on the horizontal stabilizer.

=== P-47 Thunderbolt ===
Modified T-6 Texans depicted Republic P-47 Thunderbolts in the 1977 film A Bridge Too Far.

=== P-51 Mustang ===
P-51 Mustangs featured in the 1948 Warner Bros. film Fighter Squadron which was directed by Raoul Walsh and starred Edmond O'Brien and Robert Stack. In this film, P-51Ds belonging to the California Air National Guard played the role of German Bf 109 fighters to which the P-51 bore some resemblance from certain angles. For the production, P-51s were coated with acrylic Luftwaffe paint schemes. The aerial sequences were filmed near Van Nuys in Los Angeles, California.

A P-51 Mustang piloted by Jimmy Leeward features as an antagonist in the 1980 aerobatics movie Cloud Dancer.

The Steven Spielberg film Empire of the Sun (1987), based on the J. G. Ballard novel of the same name, featured models and restored Mustangs in an attack on a Japanese airstrip next to the internment camp where the story's protagonist is imprisoned. This was the most complex and elaborately staged sequence of the film, requiring over 10 days of filming and 60 hours of aerial footage of Mustangs. Film historians and reviewers regard the scene as a significant cinematic achievement: "Spielberg's most emotionally reverberant moment, and one of the rare movie scenes that can truly be called epiphanies."

In the 1998 film Saving Private Ryan, a flight of P-51s save embattled American troops from German ground forces.

Red-Tailed P-51s play a central role in the 2012 film Red Tails when the 332nd Fighter Group is assigned to bomber escort duties, finally replacing their aging P-40s.

A P-51 Mustang, privately owned by Tom Cruise, is repaired and flown by his character Pete Mitchell, in the final scene of Top Gun: Maverick.

=== Panavia Tornado ===
The Royal Air Force's ground attack aircraft, the Panavia Tornado, featured extensively in the television pilot Strike Force, produced in the 1990s for ITV in the UK. Strike Force did not enter series production.

RAF Tornadoes featured in the 1998 BBC science fiction TV mini-series Invasion Earth written and co-produced by Jed Mercurio. In the series, Tornado jets are scrambled to intercept a UFO.

The Tornado was the subject of the 1985 video game Tornado Low Level, in which the titular aircraft was used to destroy enemy target markers. The markers could only be destroyed when the Tornado's wings were fully swept back, and moving at full speed.

=== PBY Catalina ===
A PBY Catalina features in the 1947 film High Barbaree (also released under the title Enchanted Island) which was directed by Jack Conway, starred Van Johnson and was based on the 1945 novel of the same name by Charles Nordhoff and James Norman Hall. The film portrays a PBY crew during WW2 in the Pacific. During a depth-charge attack on a Japanese submarine, the PBY is damaged and crash-lands in enemy waters, leaving only two survivors, pilot Lt. Brooke (Johnson) and navigator Lt. Moore (Cameron Mitchell).

A former Royal Danish Air Force PBY-6A Catalina appeared in the 1976 film Midway.

A PBY-5A Catalina appeared in the opening sequence of the 1989 Steven Spielberg film Always as a firebomber picking up a water load and bearing down on two startled fishermen.

In the 2002 submarine film Below, the USS Tiger Shark is directed to pick up three survivors of a torpedoed hospital ship by a Consolidated PBY-5A Catalina, marked as AH545, WQ-Z of No. 209 Squadron. The PBY-5A was marked as the Catalina that had a decisive role in the sinking of the Bismarck.

=== Percival Proctor ===
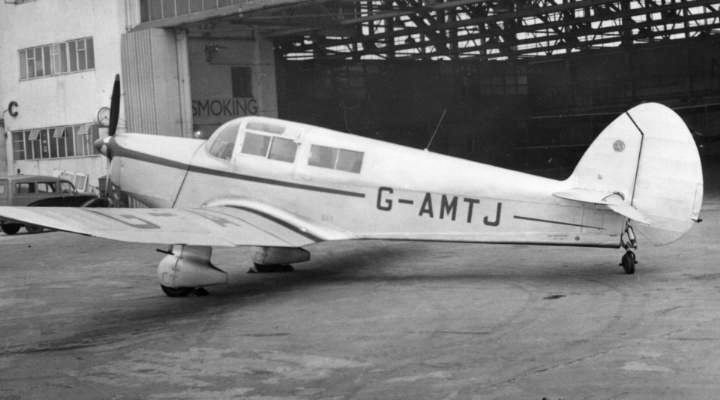
Percival Proctor

The most prominent of the real aircraft in Nevil Shute's 1951 novel Round the Bend is a war-surplus Percival Proctor, which is used by the protagonist Constantine Shak Lin (also known as Connie Shaklin) to tour Asia to spread his teachings. At the end of the book the Proctor is the basis of a shrine to Shaklin and his new creed, laid up in a hangar in a state of uncompleted maintenance for pilgrims to view.

In 1968, three Proctors were remodelled with inverted gull wings and other cosmetic alterations to represent Junkers Ju 87s in the film Battle of Britain but, in the event, radio-controlled models were used instead.

=== Pfalz D.XII ===
A Pfalz D.XII which is now in the National Air and Space Museum, Washington, D.C., was flown in The Dawn Patrol (1930), Hell's Angels (1930), and Men with Wings (1938). Footage of the Pfalz from The Dawn Patrol also featured in the 1938 remake with Errol Flynn.

=== Pilatus Porter/Fairchild AU-23 ===
The STOL-capable Pilatus PC-6 Porter was depicted in the 1990 film Air America. They were portrayed by Fairchild AU-23A Peacemakers.

=== Piper PA-28 series ===
In the 1964 James Bond film Goldfinger, the arch-villain uses Piper PA-28 Cherokees in his plan to deprive the US government of the gold in Fort Knox.

Mark Haddon's 2019 novel The Porpoise starts with the flight en route to Popham Airfield in Hampshire and subsequent crash of a Piper PA-28 Warrior caused when the pilot crashes into a silo between Gapennes and Yvrench in Somme department resulting in four deaths including a pregnant woman, the only survivor being an unborn baby saved by a passing doctor. The baby becomes the protagonist of the novel.

=== Piper PA-31 Navajo ===
In the 2017 film The Mountain Between Us, two people are stranded in a mountain wilderness after the pilot of the Piper PA-31 Navajo they chartered suffers a stroke and it crashes. Initially they stay in the wreckage waiting for searchers to find them, but they eventually realise that they will have to find their own way out of the wilderness. The film is based on a book of the same name, but in the book the aircraft is a single-engine bush plane.

=== Pitts Special ===
Pitts Special S-1S and S-2A airplanes feature prominently in the 1980 film Cloud Dancer, in which flying scenes were filmed with cameras adapted to resist up to 12 g, mounted on the planes. The story follows a competition aerobatics champion through his show season, starring David Carradine. The role of Curtis Pitts was played by Woodrow Chambliss in a short scene; the movie had the participation both in performance as in advice of pilots Tom Poberezny, Charlie Hillard, Leo Loudenslager, and Jimmy Leeward. The movie is dedicated to pilot Walt Tubb, who died a few months after the filming, coincidentally while doing the same maneuver that in the movie causes the death of one of the characters.

== R ==
=== RF-8 Crusader ===
The RF-8 is a reconnaissance version of the Vought F-8 Crusader carrier-based air superiority aircraft. In the 1980 film The Final Countdown an RF-8 is used by USS Nimitz to overfly the Pearl Harbor naval base. The photos taken during that mission of the US Navy Fleet prior to the 1941 Japanese attack, convince Nimitz's commanders that somehow they have gone back in time from the 1980s to the 1940s.

The RF-8As that played a pivotal role in obtaining low-level reconnaissance photographs of Soviet medium-range ballistic missiles (MRBMs) in Cuba during the Cuban Missile Crisis were depicted in the 2000 film Thirteen Days. The aircraft were portrayed by ex-Philippine Air Force F-8H airframes refurbished for use in the movie.

=== Royal Aircraft Factory B.E.2 ===
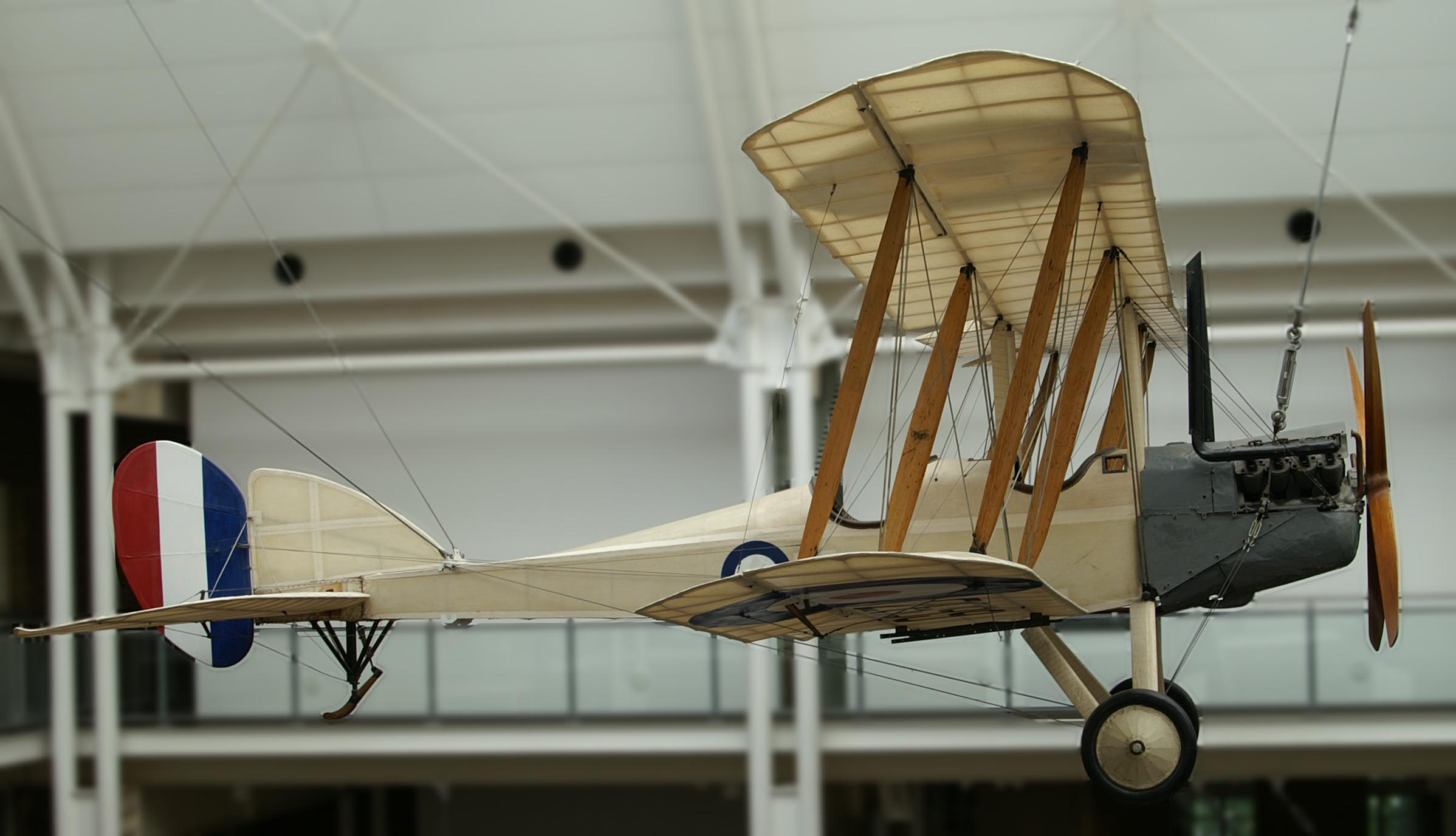
Royal Aircraft Factory B.E.2

A replica Royal Aircraft Factory B.E.2c was used in the production of the BBC Great War drama series Wings which aired in 1977–1978. The replica was originally commissioned in 1969 by Universal Studios for a proposed big-budget film Biggles Sweeps the Skies but the project was cancelled after the aircraft was built. The replica was constructed by engineer and pilot Charles Boddington, who was later killed during the making of the 1971 film Von Richthofen and Brown. On June 14, 1977, the plane was damaged in a crash in Wisconsin and deemed beyond repair. In 2004, Charles Boddington's son Matthew acquired the plane and began rebuilding it. By 2011, the plane had been restored to a functional state.

=== Ryan NYP ===
The 1938 Paramount film Men with Wings, starring Ray Milland, featured a reproduction of the Spirit of St. Louis fashioned from a Ryan B-1 Brougham.

A recreation of the Ryan NYP was used for the 1957 Warner Bros. film The Spirit of St. Louis, starring Jimmy Stewart as Charles Lindbergh.

== S ==
=== Saab JAS 39 Gripen ===
Saab JAS 39 Gripen is one of the main fighter aircraft featured in the 2019 anime series Girly Air Force.

=== SBD Dauntless ===
A Douglas SBD Dauntless was used in the production of the 1976 motion picture Midway. An SBD-5, which had formerly served in the RNZAF and which was (in 1976) non-airworthy and wingless, was used in the filming of the cockpit close-ups for actors such as Charlton Heston.

Later in 1987, the same aircraft (BuNo 28536), now in airworthy condition, was used in the production of the epic 1988–1989 TV mini-series War & Remembrance. The aircraft appeared in the sequence depicting the Battle of Midway and during filming, was flown off the USS Lexington the first time an SBD had taken off from a carrier in 42 years.

Douglas SBDs are a major feature in the 2019 film Midway directed by Roland Emmerich. The aircraft were recreated digitally and at least one full-scale static replica was built.

=== SB2C Helldiver / A-25 Shrike ===
The loss of a US Navy Curtiss SB2C-1 Helldiver was incorporated by 20th Century Fox into the 1944 film Wing and a Prayer: The Story of Carrier X.

Two USAAF Curtiss RA-25A Shrikes collided during a flypast for an air show near Spokane, Washington, on 23 July 1944, the accident filmed by a Paramount Pictures newsreel crew. This footage was used in the 1956 film Earth vs. the Flying Saucers, apparently being shot down by a saucer.

=== Short Sunderland ===
The Short Sunderland flying boat patrol bomber takes a key part in Ivan Southall's autobiographical 1974 novel Fly West, where the writer tells his life as a RAF Coastal Command Sunderland pilot during World War II. Many details about the aircraft's looks, performance and procedures are given throughout the book, and as almost the entirety of the book is set inside Sunderlands, the warplane practically becomes a character. Other aircraft, both from Allied and German origin, are also featured and mentioned.

A Short Sunderland was the setting for much of the 1980 novel The Flying Porcupine by Richard Haligon. The novel takes its title from a nickname reputedly given to the Sunderland by German pilots thanks to its defensive armament of as many as 16 machine guns.

=== Sikorsky H-5 / R-5 / HO2S / HO3S / S-51 ===
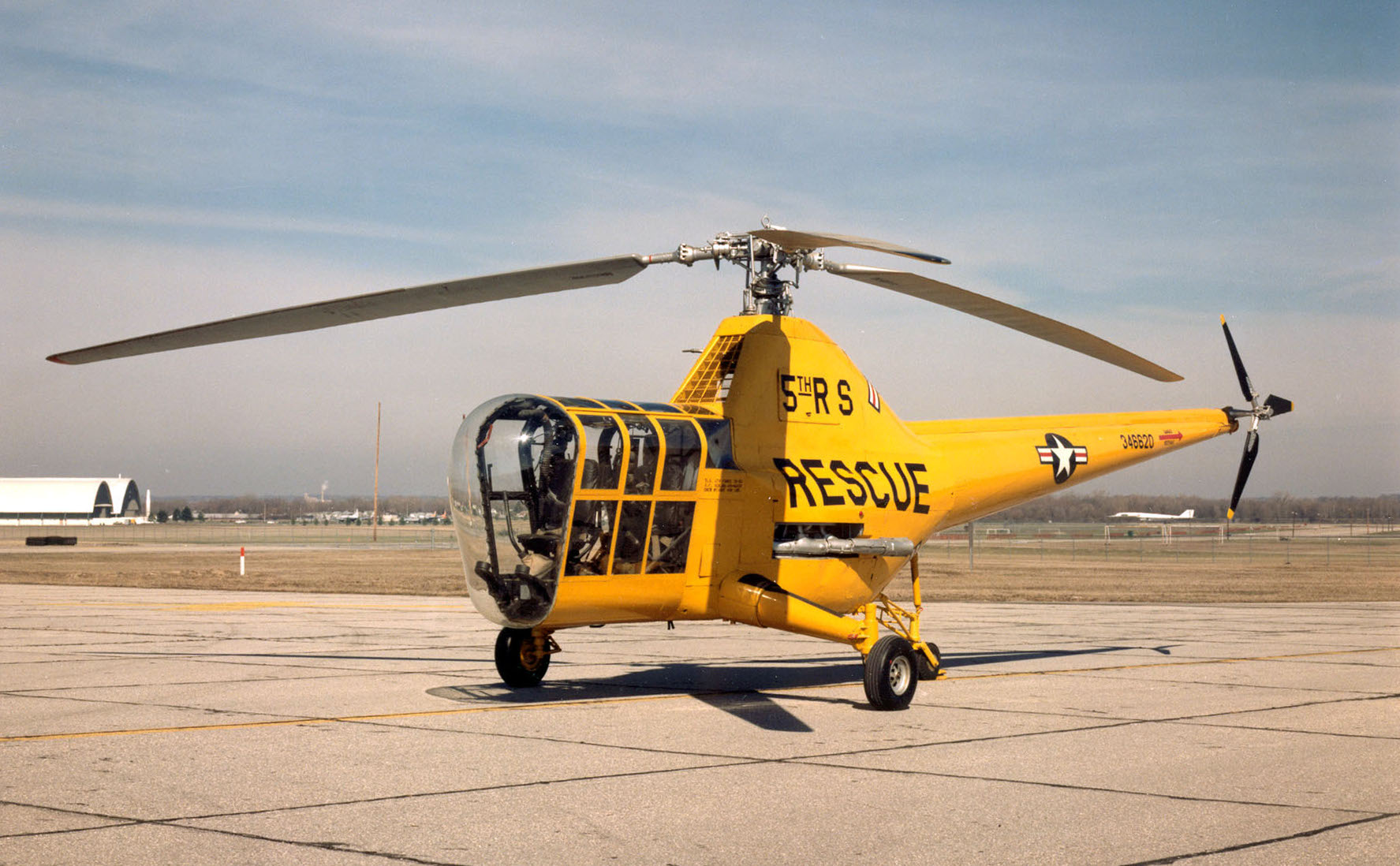
Sikorsky H-5

A Westland Widgeon, a UK-built version of the Sikorsky S-51, appears in the 1971 British film When Eight Bells Toll, starring Anthony Hopkins, directed by Étienne Périer and based on the Alistair MacLean novel of the same name. Aerial scenes were filmed over the Scottish islands of Staffa and Mull.

=== Sikorsky HO5S / S-52 ===
A Sikorsky HO5S-1 is featured in the 2022 Korean War drama film Devotion. When the film was made, the helicopter was one of the few flyable examples remaining in the world.

=== Sikorsky H-19 / Westland Whirlwind ===
The 1955 Warner Bros. film The McConnell Story, about Capt. Joseph C. McConnell, Jr., the top American ace of the Korean War, includes footage of a Sikorsky H-19 Chickasaw rescuing a downed B-29 crew in that conflict, while under heavy fire. A Chickasaw was furnished by the 48th Air Rescue Squadron, Eglin AFB, Florida, for seven days of filming at Alexandria AFB, Louisiana, in February 1955.

The character of "Harold the Helicopter" from the British children's book series, The Railway Series and its TV program adaptation, Thomas & Friends is based on the Sikorsky S-55, built in the UK as the Westland Whirlwind.

The book, Retreat Hell, by W. E. B. Griffin, takes place in Korea during the Korean War. It centers on the use of a Sikorsky H-19A helicopter during the fall 1950. Much of the action is driven forward by the abilities of the helicopter.

=== Sikorsky S-58 ===
A Sikorsky S-58T appears as the "Screaming Mimi" in the 1980s television series Riptide. This S-58 is still in service as a heavy lift helicopter.

=== Sikorsky H-53 series ===
The Sikorsky CH-53E Super Stallion appears in the 2002 film The Sum of All Fears, based on the Tom Clancy novel of the same title.

=== Sikorsky H-60 series ===
Sikorsky UH-60 Black Hawks were featured in the 1997 film Air Force One, having been rented from the US military.

The Sikorsky UH-60 Black Hawk was the title aircraft in the 2001 film Black Hawk Down. For this film too the filmmakers rented the aircraft, paying the US Department of Defense about $3 million to ship eight helicopters and about 100 crew members to the film location in Morocco.

In the 2003 film Tears of the Sun three SH-60 Seahawk helicopters bring evacuated US embassy staff and their SEAL team rescuers from Nigeria to the aircraft carrier USS Harry S. Truman. Two SH-60 Seahawk helicopters are used to retrieve a SEAL team and refugees in Nigeria.

=== Sikorsky S-29-A ===
Igor Sikorsky's Sikorsky S-29-A, previously owned by Roscoe Turner, doubled for a Gotha bomber in Howard Hughes' 1930 aerial epic Hell's Angels. It was destroyed during filming. At the time of the aircraft's demise it had flown 500,000 miles.

=== Sikorsky S-38 ===
Replicas of the Sikorsky S-38 were used in the filming of the 2004 Martin Scorsese biopic of Howard Hughes, The Aviator.

=== Sikorsky VS-44 ===
When MGM produced the 1959 film The Gallant Hours, based on the life of US Navy Admiral William "Bull" Halsey, the studio rented a Sikorsky VS-44A, N41881, named Mother Goose, from Catalina Air Lines, Inc., and painted it in wartime camouflage to depict a secret flight that Halsey had made to the South Pacific in a Consolidated PB2Y-1 Coronado. Although the studio had promised to repaint the flying boat after the production, this did not happen, and the airline had to restore the civilian livery itself.

=== Sopwith Camel ===
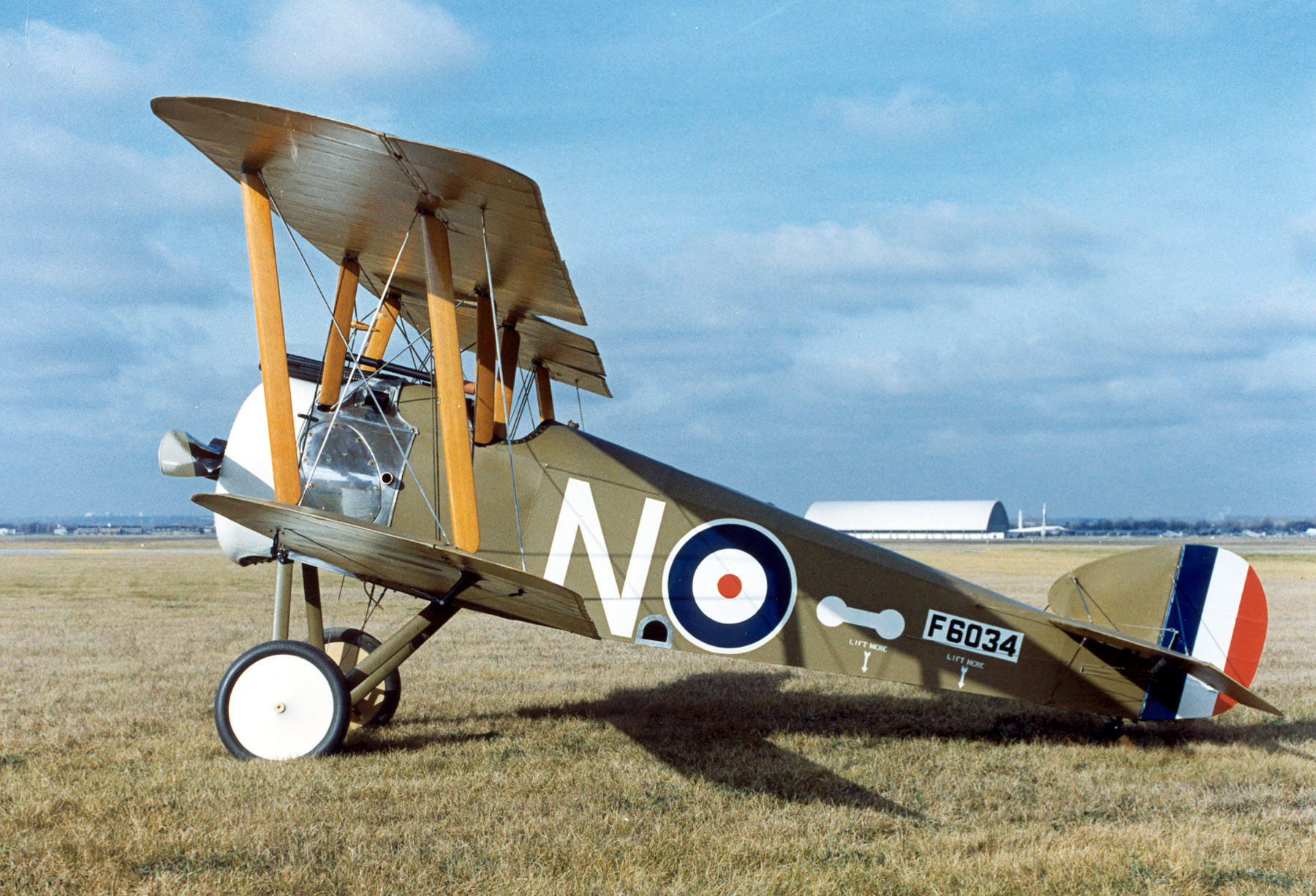
Sopwith Camel replica

The First World War Sopwith Camel fighter features prominently in the Biggles stories of W. E. Johns such as the collections: The Camels Are Coming (1932), and Biggles of the Camel Squadron (1934).

The 1934 novel Winged Victory by Victor M. Yeates features the Sopwith Camel in action during the Great War.

Sopwith Camels appear in the 2013 novel A Splendid Little War by Derek Robinson which depicts a fictional RAF unit – Merlin Squadron – flying Camels in support of the White forces during the Russian Civil War in 1919.

=== Sopwith 1½ Strutter ===
A replica Sopwith 1½ Strutter featured in the 2006 film Flyboys, a drama about the Lafayette Escadrille. The replica, built in 1992, was purchased from a private museum in Alabama.

=== Sopwith Pup ===
The fictional RFC squadron in Derek Robinson's 1999 First World War novel Hornet's Sting flies the Sopwith Pup.

=== Space Shuttle orbiter ===
In Payne Harrison's 1990 novel Storming Intrepid, the shuttle Intrepid – one of four new shuttles built by the US government – is hijacked by its mission commander, who is a Russian agent. The plot revolves around American efforts to prevent the agent from landing the shuttle in the USSR with its advanced SDI system intact.

In the 2000 film Space Cowboys, four retired astronauts launch into space aboard the shuttle Daedalus to repair a crippled Russian satellite.

In Jon Amiel's 2003 film The Core, space shuttle Endeavour is sent off course by a disruption in the Earth's magnetic field, forcing it to land in the concrete-lined channel of the Los Angeles River.

In the 2013 film Gravity, space shuttle Explorer is destroyed by an out of control satellite in the early portion of the film.

=== Stampe SV.4 ===
The 1976 film Aces High uses several modified Stampe SV.4 aircraft made to look like Royal Flying Corps Royal Aircraft Factory S.E.5 aircraft. These were prepared by Bianchi Aviation Film Services and flown by well-known pilots including Neil Williams.

=== Standard J ===
A Standard J-1 appeared in the 1923 film The Eleventh Hour, which starred Alan Hale Sr. During the film, a J-1 attacks a submarine on the surface but the aircraft is hit by return fire from the vessel and it explodes in mid-air. To film the scene, stunt pilot Dick Kerwood was required to fly over the submarine (loaned by the US Navy) in San Diego Bay and, at about 3,000 feet, parachute out of his plane after setting the timer to explosives which would detonate ten seconds later. However the timer proved faulty and the aircraft exploded before Kerwood could bale out. He was seriously concussed but otherwise escaped injury and he managed to open his chute in time.

=== Stearman C3 ===
A Stearman C3R featured in the 1958 film No Place to Land directed by Albert C. Gannaway and starring John Ireland. The film was a drama about crop-duster pilots in post-war rural California competing with each other for work.

=== Stinson Model A ===
A static replica of a Stinson Model A was featured in the 1988 Australian TV-film The Riddle of the Stinson which starred Jack Thompson. The film was a dramatisation of the true-life crash of an Australian Airlines Stinson in Queensland in 1937 which claimed the lives of 5 men and the subsequent rescue of two survivors ten days later by local Bernard O'Reilly who trekked into the rainforest and found the crash site.

=== Sukhoi Su-24 ===
The Su-24 is featured in the 2021 Russian film Sky (Russian: Небо), depicting the events surrounding the Turkish shootdown of a Russian Su-24 in 2015.

=== Sukhoi Su-57 ===
The Sukhoi Su-57 appears in Top Gun: Maverick as the aircraft used by the unnamed hostile nation, and referred to by its NATO reporting name "Felon" or as "fifth-generation fighters". Two were shot down by a stolen F-14A Tomcat flown by Maverick and Bradley "Rooster" Bradshaw, and another by a F/A-18E Super Hornet flown by Hangman.

=== Supermarine Spitfire ===
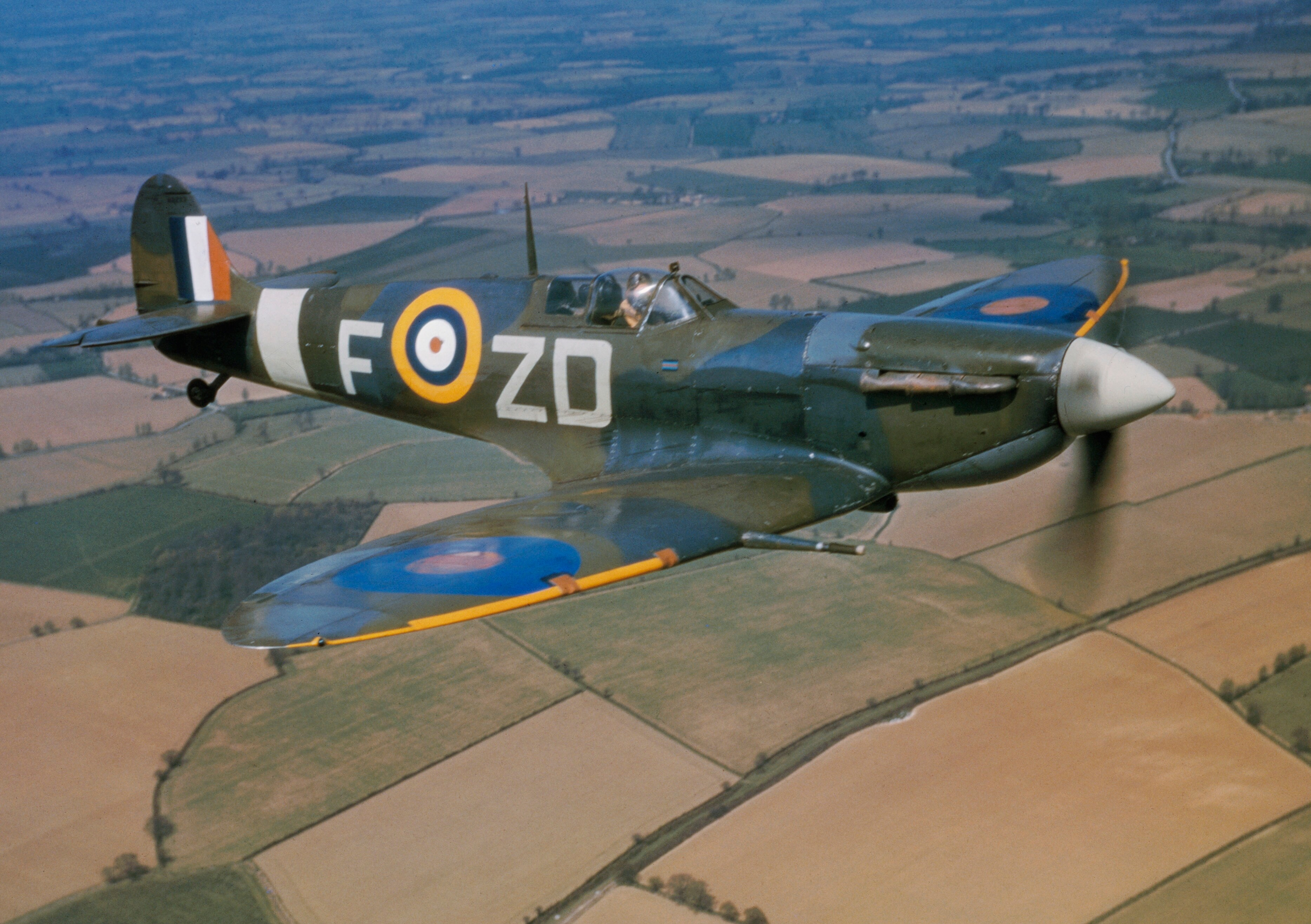
Supermarine Spitfire Mk.VB

Along with the Hawker Hurricane, the Supermarine Spitfire fighter is strongly linked to the Battle of Britain in summer 1940, where the Royal Air Force fought the German Luftwaffe over the skies of Britain for air superiority. It has been featured in many works of fiction related to the Battle of Britain.

The 1951 film Malta Story is about Spitfires and their pilots defending Malta in 1942.

A Spitfire IXc was one of at least two used in the production of the 1962 World War II epic film The Longest Day. The same aircraft also appeared in Von Ryan's Express (1965), Night of the Generals (1967), and Battle of Britain (1969).

The Spitfire was a central part of the 1969 film Battle of Britain, directed by Guy Hamilton, a fictionalized account of the real Battle of Britain that one critic called "the definitive depiction of war in the air". The film led to an increase in the popularity of the aircraft among collectors of warbirds. According to one property dealer the appearance "did for Spitfires what the James Bond films did for the Aston Martin." Producers secured 35 Spitfires for use in the film.

The Spitfire was also the main aircraft used in the 1988 miniseries Piece of Cake. The series was based on a novel by the same name. Pilots in the novel flew the Hawker Hurricane, but the lack of airworthy Hurricanes forced the producers to change aircraft types, using five privately owned airworthy Spitfires and a collection of static and taxiing replicas.

The 2001 Czech film Dark Blue World, a World War II drama about Czech pilots who flew with the Royal Air Force directed by Jan Svěrák, featured Spitfires. The vintage Spitfires cost the filmmakers US$7,500 an hour to use. The aerial sequences were a combination of live aerial footage, CGI and out-takes from the 1969 film The Battle of Britain.

Spitfires starred in the 2006 seven-minute short film Pilots, produced as a commercial by the Swiss-German watch manufacturer IWC Schaffhausen to promote its Big Pilot's Watch Collection. John Malkovich featured in the film.

In the 2017 movie Dunkirk, directed by Christopher Nolan, three Spitfires were featured defending the evacuation of British and French troops from Dunkirk against attacks by the German Luftwaffe.

=== Supermarine Swift ===
The second prototype Supermarine Swift appeared as the Prometheus in the 1952 film The Sound Barrier.

== T ==
=== TBD Devastator ===
Douglas TBDs appear in the 2019 film Midway directed by Roland Emmerich. To portray the aircraft, the producers recreated TBDs digitally and also constructed a full-scale static replica which, after filming was completed, was donated to the USS Midway Museum in San Diego. In the film, TBDs are depicted as simultaneously carrying a pair of 500-pound bombs on wing racks in addition to a torpedo, a scene which would not have happened in reality, as under-powered TBDs struggled enough with the weight of just a torpedo.

=== Tupolev Tu-154 ===
A Tupolev Tu-154B was in the centre of the plot of the 1979 Soviet film Air Crew. The film is a recognized classic in Commonwealth of Independent States (CIS) countries.

== U ==
=== UFM Easy Riser ===
The UFM Easy Riser was one of two ultralight aircraft that lead the Canada geese south in the 1996 film Fly Away Home. The film was a highly fictionalized account based on Bill Lishman's autobiography and work with Operation Migration, but both Lishman's real-life migratory experiments teaching birds to migrate and the film used the Easy Riser, due to its low cruising speed, which allowed the birds to pace the aircraft in flight.

== V ==
=== Vickers FB5 Gunbus ===
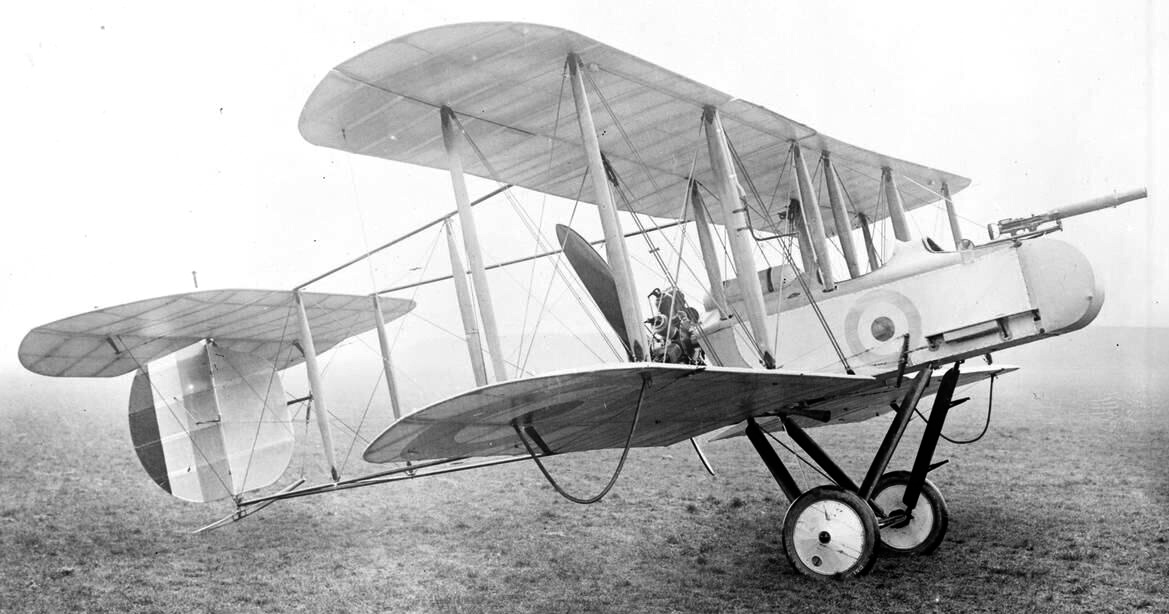
Vickers FB5

A replica Vickers FB5 was constructed to appear in the 1986 film Sky Bandits (also released under the title Gunbus) which was about a pair of cowboys who flee the US to escape prison for a bank robbery and end up serving in the RFC during the Great War. The replica, built as a taxiing prop for the film, is currently housed at Sywell Aerodrome in the UK.

=== Vickers Wellington ===
The Vickers Wellington features in the 1941 film Target for Tonight.

Nevil Shute's romance Pastoral is a wartime story of a pilot and his crew of a Wellington bomber based at a fictional RAF station called "Hartley Magna".

A Vickers Wellington features in the 1961 comedy film Very Important Person (released in the US as A Coming Out Party). In the film, the central character, a military scientist named Sir Ernest Pease (James Robertson Justice) is taken over Germany during WW2 to test a top-secret apparatus. However the Wellington is hit by anti-aircraft fire and Pease is sucked out through a hole in the fuselage, parachuting into enemy territory and ending up in a POW camp.

The 1968 Czechoslovak film Nebeští jezdci (Sky Riders) about Czechoslovak airmen in RAF Bomber Command featured a Vickers Wellington. It was depicted by a taxiing replica based on an extensively modified Lisunov Li-2. Flight sequences were shot with large-scale replicas and the film also incorporated wartime stock footage, including scenes from Target for Tonight.

A haunted Vickers Wellington is the subject of Robert Westall's macabre, and critically appreciated, 1982 short story Blackham's Wimpy.

Irish graphic novelist Garth Ennis chose the Wellington to be the aircraft flown by the Australian crew of RAF Bomber Command in his 2010 graphic novel Happy Valley, set in 1942 during the early phase of the night bombing offensive and one of his Battlefields series.

=== V-22 Osprey ===
Two Bell-Boeing CV-22 Ospreys (of only three in the USAF inventory at the time) were filmed in flight at Holloman Air Force Base, New Mexico, in May 2006 for the 2007 Transformers film. This would inspire a host of Transformers toys and characters based on the Osprey including the Decepticons Incinerator and Ruination as well as the Autobots Springer and Blades.

== W ==
=== Waco 10 ===
At least seven Waco 10 biplanes were employed in the production of the 1928 silent film Lilac Time, a romantic drama about a British pilot in the Royal Flying Corps in WW1. The film was directed by George Fitzmaurice and starred Gary Cooper. Wacos played the role of generic RFC planes and three were deliberately crashed during filming of the aerial combat scenes. Dick Grace, only just recovered from injuries he sustained while working on the film Wings the previous year, was the stunt pilot for two of the crash-landing scenes.

=== Wallis Autogyro ===
The Wallis WA-116 Agile was an autogyro offering improved stability over previous designs. It was developed in the 1960s by Ken Wallis, a former Wing Commander of the RAF. Following a prototype, five WA-116s were built by Beagle Aircraft at Shoreham, three of which were for evaluation by the British Army Air Corps. In 1966, one of the Beagle-built WA-116s, registered G-ARZB, was modified for use in the 1967 James Bond film You Only Live Twice. The WA-116 was dubbed "Little Nellie" and was flown by Ken Wallis, who was doubling for Sean Connery's James Bond.

=== Wright Flyer ===
The Wright brothers' Wright Flyer is featured in the seventh season episode of The Simpsons "Sideshow Bob's Last Gleaming". In the episode, first aired 26 November 1995, Sideshow Bob steals the Flyer while it is on display at an airshow. While Krusty the Clown is making a television broadcast from a shack, Sideshow Bob flies into the side of the building in an attempt to stop the broadcast. Instead of demolishing the building, the frail Flyer merely bounces off the wall undamaged.

=== Wright Model B ===
Several replicas of the Wright Model B were constructed for the filming of the 1978 telemovie The Winds of Kitty Hawk. One of the replicas is now owned and preserved by Wright B Flyers Inc. based in Dayton, Ohio.

== X ==
=== XB-51 ===
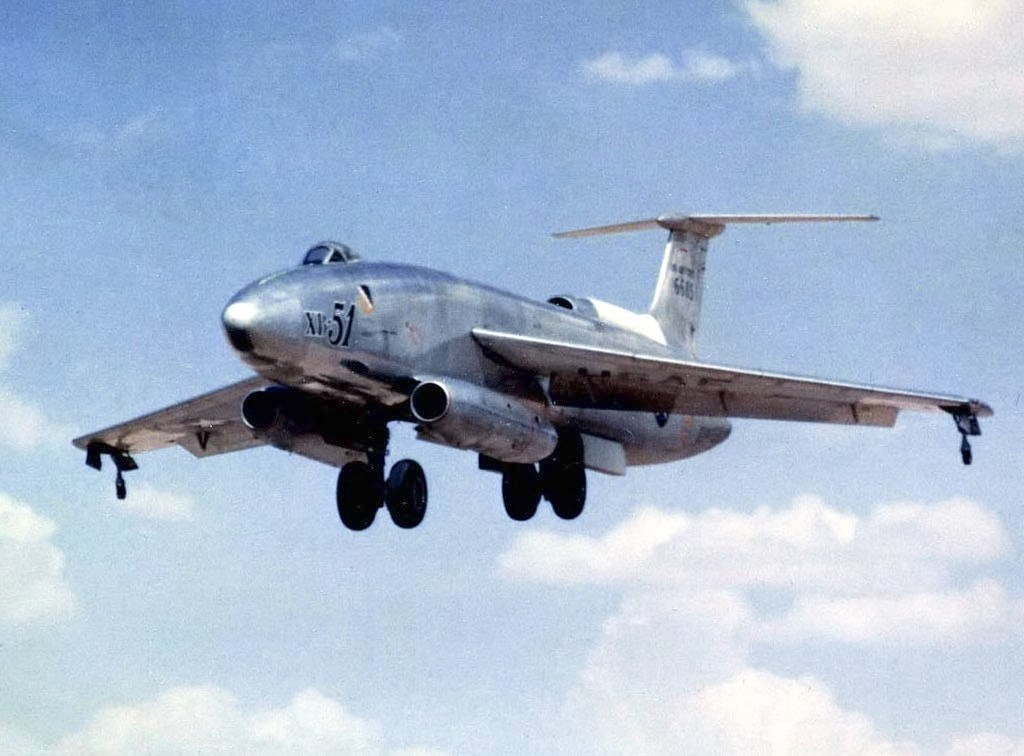
Martin XB-51 in Toward the Unknown

The Martin XB-51 depicted the fictional Gilbert XF-120 in the 1956 film Toward the Unknown, starring William Holden as a test pilot. On 25 March 1956, the first XB-51 prototype, 46-0685, crashed in sand dunes near Biggs Air Force Base, El Paso, Texas, killing both crew, while staging to Eglin AFB, Florida, for filming of scenes for the motion picture.

== Z ==
=== Zeppelin ===
A Zeppelin appears in the 1929 Fox Corporation film The Sky Hawk which was directed by John G. Blystone. The film portrayed an aristocratic Englishman Jack Bardell (played by John Garrick) who joins the Royal Flying Corps during the Great War. In the film, Bardell is badly injured in a crash in France which leaves him with only partial use of his legs. The unclear circumstances surrounding the crash lead him to suffer accusations of cowardice. Determined to reclaim his honour, Bardell secretly rebuilds a derelict aircraft and attaches special stirrups to the rudder pedals so he is able to fly it. He takes off on an unauthorised patrol over London and destroys a Zeppelin raider, restoring his reputation in the process.

A German Zeppelin is shot down in the 1930 Howard Hughes film Hell's Angels.

A bombing raid by a Zeppelin comprises a major plot point in the Elsie McCutcheon novel Summer of the Zeppelin.

=== Zeppelin-Staaken R.VI ===
In the 2017 film Wonder Woman, a Zeppelin-Staaken R.VI is loaded with 4,500 pounds of bombs filled with poisonous gas intended for London. Steve Trevor destroys it by detonating the payload mid-flight, sacrificing himself.

== See also ==
- List of fictional spacecraft
- Airborne aircraft carrier
- Aviation accidents and incidents in fiction

== Bibliography ==
- Allen, Richard Sanders (1988). Revolution in the Sky: The Lockheeds of Aviation's Golden Age (Revised ed.). New York: Orion Books. ISBN 978-0-517-56678-7.
- Barnes, Christopher Henry; James, Derek N. (1965). The Penetrators. London: Souvenir Press. ISBN 0-85177-819-4.
- Bellomo, Mark (2007). Transformers Identification and Price Guide. Iola, Wisconsin: Krause Publications. ISBN 9780896894457.
- Brown, Gary R. (April 2012). "More Than Just A Movie Messerschmitt". Classic Aircraft. Stamford, Lincs, UK: Key Publishing Ltd.
- Chapman, John; Goodall, Geoff (1992). Warbirds Directory: An International Survey of the World's Warbird Population. Mansfield, Notts: Warbirds Worldwide.
- Cotta Vaz, Mark; Duignan, Patricia Rose (1996). Industrial Light & Magic: Into the Digital Realm. New York: DelRey (Ballantine). ISBN 978-0-345-38152-1.
- Gilman, J.D.; Clive, John (1978). KG 200. London: Pan Books Ltd. p. 315. ISBN 0-85177-819-4.
- Hardwick, Jack; Schnepf, Ed (1989). "A Viewer's Guide to Aviation Movies". The Making of the Great Aviation Films. General Aviation Series. Vol. 2. Canoga Park, California: Challenge Publications.
- Ogden, Bob (1986). Great Aircraft Collections of the World. New York: Gallery Books. ISBN 9780831740665.
- Piercey, Stephen (1984). Sky Truck. London: Osprey Publishing Limited. ISBN 0-85045-552-9.
- Suid, Lawrence H. (2002). Guts and Glory: The Making of the American Military Image in Film. The University Press of Kentucky. ISBN 0-8131-2225-2. LCCN 2001-007630.
- Wohl, Robert (2005). The Spectacle of Flight: Aviation and the Western Imagination, 1920–1950. Carlton, Victoria: Melbourne University Press. ISBN 0-300-10692-0.
- Zicree, Marc Scott (1982). The Twilight Zone Companion. New York: Bantam Books. ISBN 9781879505094.
