= Quiet Night (play) =

Quiet Night is a 1941 Australian play by Dorothy Blewett.

The play was popular with repertory and amateur theatre groups. It was also adapted for radio and television.

== Plot ==
Doctors and nurses try to save the life of a 20-year-old. During the night the nurses have their own personal dramas.

== 1952 radio version ==
The play was adapted for radio by the BBC in 1952. The cast included several Australian actresses living in London.

== 1961 television play ==
Quiet Night
- Genre: drama
- Based on: play by Dorothy Blewett
- Written by: Wal Cherry
- Directed by: Christopher Muir
- Country of origin: Australia
- Original language: English

Production
- Running time: 60 mins
- Production company: ABC

Original release
- Network: ABV-2
- Release: 28 June 1961 (Melbourne)
- Network: ABN-2
- Release: 2 August 1961 (Sydney)

Quiet Night is an Australian television play which aired in 1961 on ABC at a time when Australian TV drama production was relatively rare. The writer and director had previously adapted another Blewett play The First Joanna.

Originally broadcast live in Melbourne on 28 June 1961, it was recorded and also shown in Sydney (it is not known if it was also shown on ABC's stations in Adelaide, Brisbane and Perth). It was the 48th live play from ABV, the ABC's Melbourne arm.

=== Plot ===
Playboy Russell Keane crashes his sports car and is taken to the Memorial Wing of St Andrews' Hospital in Melbourne. Nurse Sinclair takes the call that there is an accident. Sister Murphy and Nurse Sparrow are also working on duty. Nurse Sinclair has five days to complete her training.

Russell Keane drinks some whiskey and needs to be operated on. His blood group is rare and Nurse Sinclair offers up her own blood. Dr Macready is romantically involved with Nurse Sparrow. Dr Clayton is a patient. Russell Keane's parents arrive.

=== Cast ===
- Paul Karo as Russell Keane
- Mary Disney as Nurse Sinclair
- Mary Mackay as Sister Murphy
- Elizabeth Goodman as Sister Rankin
- Fay Kelton as Nurse Sparrow
- Nancy Cato as Nurse Curtain
- Sonia Borg as Nurse Teuber, a junior nurse
- Mark Kelly as Doctor Macready
- Elizabeth Wing as Leila Clayton
- Michael Duffield as Doctor Clayton
- Natalie Raine as Matron
- Betty Eames as Mrs Keane
- Charles Sinclaire as Mr Keane
- Graham Hughes as the farmer
- Ken Goodlet
- Norman Brown
- Lyndel Rowe
- Agnes Dobson
- Leon Lissek

=== Production ===
The program was mostly filmed at ABC's studios in Melbourne, apart from the crash sequence which was shot on a road outside the city. There was a cast of nineteen. Kevin Bartlett did the sets.

=== Reception ===
The Sydney Morning Herald said the show "proved that Australian productions can at times far outpace the imported variety... the play's principal charm lay in its warm and authentic hospital background."
