= Topaze (Wednesday Theatre) =

- Wednesday Theatre episode
- Episode no.: Season 2 Episode 13
- Directed by: Christopher Muir
- Teleplay by: John Warwick
- Based on: Topaze by Marcel Pagnol
- Original air date: 6 April 1966
- Running time: 60 mins

Episode chronology
| ← Previous "My One True Love" | Next → "The Lover" |

"Topaze" is a 1966 Australian TV play based on the 1928 play by the French writer Marcel Pagnol. It aired on 6 April 1966 in Sydney, on 30 March 1966 in Melbourne, and on 27 April 1966 in Brisbane.

== Plot ==
Topaze is a school master sacked for being too honest who, subsequently, becomes involved with thieves.

== Cast ==
- Mark Albiston as Topaze
- Fernande Glyn as Suzy
- Allan Trevor as Castel-Benac
- Patricia Kennedy as Baroness
- Fay Kelton as Ernestine, daughter of the headmaster
- Terry Norris as Tamise
- Edward Howell as Journalist
- Jack Allan as Muche
- Robert Bogden as Roger
- Peter Drake as Butler
- Diana Wilson as Typist
- Christie Clayton as Typist
- Ron Hoenig as Pupil

== Production ==
This was director Christopher Muir's first production back in Australia after six months abroad. It was the first locally produced edition of Wednesday Theatre for 1966. The production was given an Edwardian setting designed by Cass van Pufelen.

Muir said "essentially the play shows how men can be corrupted by power. Marcel Pagnol... begins all his plays as amusing, lighthearted comedies. However as the plot unfolds you find there's some extremely important point which he's trying to get across. In Topaze we see how a timid, almost stupid person becomes a cold hearted business tycoon. The peculiar twists of fate which produce a totally different man give you something to think about."

== Reception ==
The Sydney Morning Herald said "Topaze is a fine French satire and the Melbourne production was impeccable... Nobody could complain about how it was done. But to the Australian people... of 1966 it could only look and sound like a fussy little piece about some French types who may have lived 40 years ago...The A.B.C. has no right to spend money, time and effort on a little show. In fact, the executives who selected Pagnol's play could take a cue from one line spoken by Fernunde Glyn: "I think you might go out and meet people"."
