= Bartered Bride =

Bartered bride may refer to:

- Bride-purchase, bride-selling, or bride trading
- The Bartered Bride, an 1870 comic opera
- The Bartered Bride (1932 film)
- The Bartered Bride (1960 film)
