= Sylvia (1961 film) =

- Country of origin: Australia
- Original language: English

Production
- Producer: Christopher Muir
- Production company: Australian Broadcasting Commission

Original release
- Release: 8 March 1961 (Melbourne)

Sylvia is a 1961 TV ballet broadcast by the Australian Broadcasting Corporation. It was directed by Christopher Muir.

== Premise ==
A ballet set in ancient Greece. The love of Aminta for Sylvia.

== Cast ==
- Laurence Bishop as Eros
- Janet Karin as Sylvia
- Ray Trickett as Orlon
- Garth Welch as Aminta
