= Martine (1961 film) =

- Ad in The Age 1 Nov 1961
- Written by: Wal Cherry
- Country of origin: Australia
- Original language: English

Production
- Producer: Christopher Muir
- Running time: 60 mins
- Production company: Australian Broadcasting Commission

Original release
- Release: 1 November 1961 (Melbourne, live)
- Release: 27 December 1961(Sydney, taped)

Martine is a 1961 Australian television play directed by Christopher Muir in Melbourne.

It was based on a play by Jean-Jacques Bernard.

== Plot ==
In France, a young peasant girl Martine is secretly in love with Julien, a sophisticated man, even though he has a wife Joanne, who Madame Mervan arranged for him to marry. Alfred courts Martine but she rejects him.

== Cast ==
- Annette Andre as Martine
- Fred Parslow as Julien
- Joan Harris as Jeanne
- Barbara Brandon as Madame Mervan, Julien's grandmother
- Lloyd Cunnington as Station master
- Graham Hughes as Alfred, a peasant

== Production ==
The play was long in the repertoire of the Comedie Francaise and director Chris Muir said it required tender and delicate handling. Annette Andre said she enjoyed working with Muir "he was very intelligent and more experienced. He wasn’t easy, but he could get a performance out of an actor."

== Reception ==
The Sydney Morning Herald said Parslow's "fine acting gave" the production "a touch of excellence that it otherwise could not hope to attain" calling the story "poignant, tender and slight."
