= The First Joanna =

The First Joanna is a 1943 play by Dorothy Blewett that was adapted for radio and television.

== Plot ==
An English girl called Joanna marries an Australian wine-grower and moves to his family home in South Australia. She does not like it and is about to leave when she discovers the diary of the first Joanna who built the home during colonial times.

== Production history ==
The play won a competition in 1947.

The play was adapted for radio in 1948 at the ABC. The production starred English actor Jane Barrett, who was in Australia to star in Eureka Stockade.

The play was performed at May Hollinworth's Metropolitan Theatre in 1948, starring John Bushelle, Lynne Murphy, Betty Lucas, Wanda Herbert, Marcel Wattel, Lola Sweeney as the first Joanna and Dinah Shearing as the second Joanna.

== 1961 television adaptation ==
The First Joanna
- Genre: historical
- Based on: play by Dorothy Blewett
- Written by: Wal Cherry
- Directed by: Christopher Muir
- Country of origin: Australia
- Original language: English

Production
- Running time: 75 mins
- Production company: ABC

Original release
- Network: ABV-2 (Melbourne)
- Release: 22 February 1961 (Melbourne)
- Release: 3 May 1961 (Sydney, taped)

Playwright Wal Cherry adapted The First Joanna for ABC Television. The production, directed by Christopher Muir, aired in 1961. Australian TV drama was relatively rare at the time. The ABC also produced Blewett's Quiet Night later that year.

=== Plot ===
Joanna is a sophisticated Englishwoman whose husband Stephen Deveron owns a vineyard in South Australia. Joanna was caught up in Europe during World War Two and sent to a German concentration camp; she and her husband were separated for six years. When she arrives at the vineyard she finds country life dull and decides to leave her husband and return to England.

Two eccentric 92 year old Deveron aunts give Joanna a tapestry chair that belonged to the first Joanna. Hidden in the chair are two diaries containing a detailed record of the lives of the first Joanna and her husband Stephen.

=== Cast - Modern Era ===
- Lee Norton as the second Joanna
- Norman Kaye as Stephen Deveron
- Madeline Howell as Jocelyn
- Kevin Miles as Halley van Drutten
- Barbara Brandon as Editha
- Lorna Forbes as Viola
- Olive Verdon as Mrs Collins
- Stewart Weller as Jackson

=== Cast - Colonial Era ===
- Pat Connolly as the first Joanna
- Norman Kaye as Stephen Deveron
- Peter LaTrobe as Captain Jules Smith
- William Lloyd as Sir Bertram Tavener
- Natalie Raine as Lady Caroline Tavener
- Laura James as Beatrice Tavener
- Fay Kelton as Augusta
- George Whaley as a soldier
- Rohonda Nunquam as Editha
- Diana Sinnamon as Viola
- Roland Heimans as Phillip

=== Production ===
Dorothy Blewett said she wanted to produce a play of character and ideas, illustrating the value of a family tradition but emphasising the dangers that arrive if that tradition is misunderstood or misapplied. "So many Australians are proud of the wrong things in their heritage," said Blewett. "We should face up to the truth of our beginnings and be grateful to the adventurous spirits who fought hard and subdued our hard country in the early days."

The play was shot at the Melbourne ABC TV studios at Ripponlea with some additional location filming for a vineyard scene with Norman Kaye done at Chateau Tahbilk. Author Dorothy Blewett, who lived in Melbourne, attended many rehearsals. Well-known stage performers Norman Kaye and Lee Norton made their Australian TV debuts

Chris Muir worked in Melbourne. Prior to production he watched Little Theatre productions. He was trying to cast actors who were less familiar to audiences. This resulted in Norman Kaye and Peter Latrobe being cast.

=== Reception ===
The Sydney Morning Herald critic wrote "the production was a success, to the extent of making much of little; for the play itself often slips out of its intended dramatic mould into something approaching melodrama... Patricia Connolly was very sweet and convincing, Lee Norton was a trifle brittle... Muir was well served by rich and spacious sets."

Filmink said "To be frank, it has an amateurish feel – most of the acting is over the top, the sets and costumes come across as “am dram”. Blewett’s original play has a terrific central concept, strong characters and ideas, and could have been the basis of a strong drama. It definitely had flaws – too many characters, too many subplots – but these could have been fixed with a proper adaptation. Cherry’s script is too faithful to the original. In fairness, I only viewed half the production, and it is good to see Norman Kaye in an early role."
