= Country Life (film) =

- DVD cover
- Directed by: Michael Blakemore
- Written by: Michael Blakemore; Anton Chekhov
- Produced by: Robin Dalton
- Starring: Sam Neill; Greta Scacchi; John Hargreaves; Kerry Fox; Patricia Kennedy
- Cinematography: Stephen F. Windon
- Edited by: Nicholas Beauman
- Music by: Peter Best
- Distributed by: United International Pictures
- Release date: 27 October 1994
- Running time: 118 minutes
- Country: Australia
- Language: English
- Box office: $360,957 (Australia) $350,354 (USA)

Country Life is a 1994 Australian drama film, adapted from the 1899 play Uncle Vanya by Anton Chekhov. The film was directed by Michael Blakemore. The cast includes Sam Neill, Greta Scacchi, John Hargreaves and Googie Withers. It was entered into the 19th Moscow International Film Festival.

== Plot ==
The film is set in Australia 1919, just a year after World War I. Australia begins to question the value of continuing as an outpost to the British Empire. Since his sister's death years ago, Jack Dickens has raised his niece Sally, aided by his sharp-tongued maid Hannah. Sally's father, Alexander Voysey, abandoned her after her mother's death and took off for the bright lights of the city, ostensibly making a name for himself as a literary critic and writer in London. Jack and Sally have sacrificed their own hopes and dreams to run the farm while Voysey disports himself in the city. Despite the claims of success, Voysey is a self-centered, self-aggrandizing, pompous windbag with no visible means of support beyond leeching off his brother-in-law's labours on the farm.

Voysey has remarried a younger woman, Deborah, who has come to regret her marriage. Voysey subjects Deborah to cruel behavior from him, such as fetching things he's dropped at his whim and making advances to other women right in front of her. Deborah is deeply unhappy, and feels that she has wasted her youth and squandered her life by marrying Voysey. Both Jack and the town doctor are soon smitten by Deborah, while Sally pines for the town doctor herself. The true natures, characters, and hopes and dreams within the family are revealed as things fall apart.

== Cast ==
- Sam Neill as Dr. Max Askey
- Greta Scacchi as Deborah Voysey
- John Hargreaves as Jack Dickens
- Kerry Fox as Sally Voysey
- Michael Blakemore as Alexander Voysey
- Googie Withers as Hannah
- Patricia Kennedy as Maud Dickens
- Ron Blanchard as Wally Wells
- Robyn Cruze as Violet
- Maurie Fields as Fred Livingstone
- Bryan Marshall as Mr. Pettinger
- Tony Barry as Logger
- Terry Brady as Logger
- Tom Long as Billy Livingstone
- Rob Steele as James
- Ian Bliss as David Archdale
- Colin Taylor as Mr Wilson
- Ian Cockburn as Mr Archdale
- Reg Cribb as Vicar

== Box office ==
Country Life grossed $360,957 at the box office in Australia.

== Home media ==
Country Life was released on DVD by Umbrella Entertainment in May 2012. The DVD is compatible with all region codes and includes a behind-the-scenes special feature.
