= Uncle Martino =

- Ad from the Age 24 Aug 1960
- Written by: Victor Rietti
- Music by: William Fitzwater
- Country of origin: Australia
- Original language: English

Production
- Producer: Christopher Muir
- Running time: 60 mins
- Production company: Australian Broadcasting Commission

Original release
- Release: 24 August 1960 (Melbourne, live)
- Release: 9 November 1960 (Sydney, taped)

Uncle Martino is a 1960 Australian television play. It was directed by Christopher Muir from a play by Guido Cantini.

== Premise ==
In an Italian village, a family is unsure if Uncle Martino is a millionaire or a pauper.

== Cast ==
- Don Crosby as Martino
- Peter O'Shaughnessy as Salvi
- Barbara Brandon as Ameila
- Moira Carleton as Mansueta
- Kira Daniels as Gina
- Collins Hilton as Procaccia
- Paul Karo as Silvio
- Dennis Miller as Michel
- Joy Mitchell as Viola
- Ron Pinnell as Ghigo
- Wyn Roberts as Trulla

== Reception ==
The Sydney Morning Herald thought that the production "lacked the sheer relish in character-drawing and good humoured gusto that would have made it more than a rather laboured dissection of cupidity."
