= Paul Karo =

Australian actor (1935–2025)

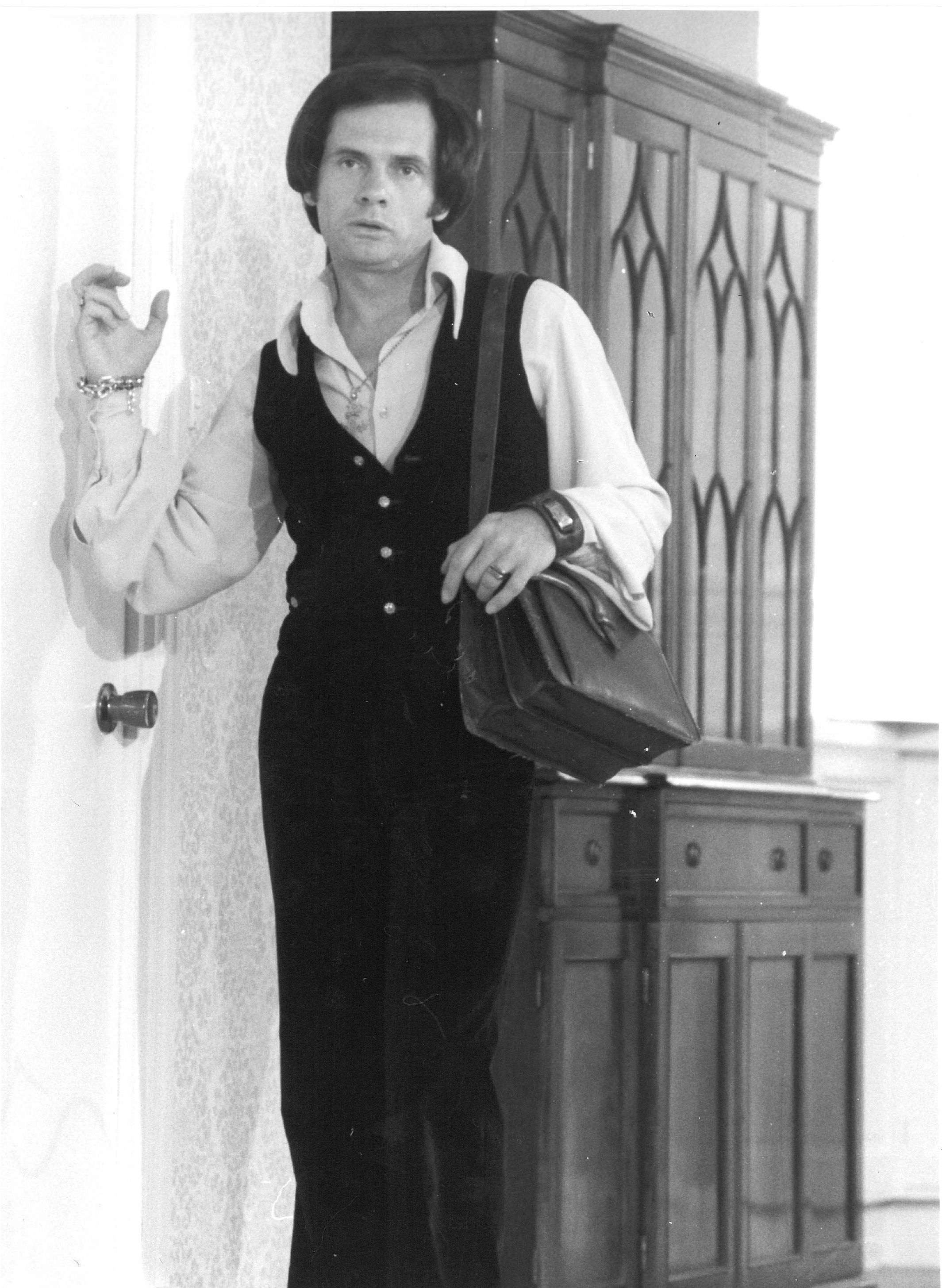
- Born: June 1935; Edinburgh, Scotland
- Died: 4 April 2025 (aged 89)
- Education: Auckland University
- Occupations: Actor, producer, reporter
- Years active: 1955–1999 (acting career)
- Known for: The Box (TV series) as Lee Whiteman

Paul Karo (June 1935 – 4 April 2025) was a Scottish-born, New Zealand and Australian actor and producer. He was notable for his role in Crawford Productions' first television soap opera The Box (as well as the feature film version of the same title) as the LGBTIQA character of television studio producer Lee Whiteman in 1974 and 1975, as well as a return to the role in 1976, at a time when gay characters were rare on television and usually portrayed unsympathetically. He and Number 96 star Joe Hasham became cult figures for the gay liberation movement. He also became notable for his recurring role as Detective Inspector Rouse on series Prisoner in the 1980s.

== Life and career ==
Karo—not his birth name—was born in June 1935 in Edinburgh, Scotland. His family moved to New Zealand in 1946, where he took on the Māori language surname Karo. He grew up in Auckland, New Zealand. He was educated at Auckland Grammar School and the University of Auckland. He worked for two years as a cadet reporter at The New Zealand Herald.

Karo became interested in acting and joined the New Zealand Players theatre company for two years. He relocated to Sydney, Australia in 1957, where he resumed his career in theatre and appeared in Under the Clocks, a 'sophisticated intimate revue' in Melbourne in 1958. He featured in another revue, Further Off the Beach, the following year; he was singled out by a critic from The Age for a segment called 'Television Anonymous' about television addicts seeking a cure.

He had many television and film roles starting from 1959, including Tragedy in a Temporary Town, Beauty and the Beast, Outpost, and Rope.

He appeared in Quiet Night in 1961. In 1967 he received an award for Best Actor of 1966 (the "Erik") from Melbourne theatre critics for his role in A Lily for Little India.

Karo is best known for his role as the gay television producer Lee Whiteman in the 1970s television soap opera The Box. On leaving the show after 18 months in the role he told TV Week's Sue Wallace that he felt he had been typecast: "Everyone thinks of me as playing the role of a queer. They haven't had the opportunity to see me do anything else." He was unemployed for a year, then rejoined The Box and won the Logie Award in 1976 and the Penguin Award for Best Actor for his portrayal of Whiteman.

Other selected television credits include: Homicide, Division 4, Matlock Police, Prisoner, The Sullivans, Special Squad, Phoenix, Blue Heelers and SeaChange.

Karo retired in 1999, and died on 4 April 2025, at the age of 89.

== Filmography ==
=== Film ===
Title	Year	Role	Type
Tragedy in a Temporary Town	1959	Raphael Infante	TV movie
OutPost	1959	Flight Sgt. Steve McCudden	TV movie
Uncle Martino	1960	Silvio	TV movie
Quiet Night	1961	Russell Keane	TV movie
Boy Round the Corner	1962	Gerry Lacey	TV movie
A Piece of Ribbon	1963		TV movie
And the Big Men Fly	1963	Wally Sloss	TV movie
Duet: The Face at the Club House Door and How Do You Spell Matrimony?	1965		TV movie
Plain Jane	1966		TV movie
Demonstrator	1971	Charles East	Feature film
The Box	1975	Lee Whiteman	Feature film
The Lion's Share	1978		TV movie
Death of a Soldier	1986	Opposition MP	Feature film
A Cry in the Dark (aka Evil Angels)	1988	Lecturer	Feature film
Paperback Romance (aka Lucky Break)	1994	Defence Lawyer	Feature film

=== Television ===
Title	Year	Role	Type
Consider Your Verdict	1962	Hugh Barte	TV series
The Magic Boomerang	1965	2 roles: Johnson – Oswald III – Whitey the Postman	TV series
Homicide	1965-1974	11 character roles: Tony Merrick - Tony Edwards - Ernie Slade - Alan Maddern – Frank Duncan - Danny Taylor - Tiger Thompson - Maurice Sharp - Tony Hewitt - Carl Warren Lee – Club Customer - Philps - Jim Sinclair - Ernst Brenner	TV series
Adventures of the Seaspray	1966	Criminal	TV series
The Long Arm	1970	Gregory Watson	TV series
Division 4	1969–72	3 character roles: Bert Sweeney – Harry Sullivan – Jimmy Hansen	TV series
Matlock Police	1971–73	3 character roles: Brendon Parker Smith – David Shannessy – Kevin Harrison	TV series
The Box	1974–75, 1976	Lee Whiteman	TV series, 441 episodes
Case for the Defence	1978	Doctor Brian Mark	TV series
The Sullivans	1978	Reverent Roland	TV series
Skyways	1979	Brett Miles	TV series
Cop Shop	1980–81	3 character roles: Percy Bradford – Graham Jordon – Norman Lyons	TV series
Prisoner (aka Prisoner: Cell Block H)	1981–84	Detective Inspector Rouse	TV series
Special Squad	1984	Scaffer – Skinny	TV series
Carson's Law	1983–84	3 character roles: Allan – Giles D.Albert – Charles McMillan	TV series
Golden Pennies	1985	Marcel	TV series
A Thousand Skies	1985	English Director	TV miniseries
Anzacs	1985	Doctor	TV miniseries
My Brother Tom	1986	Chemist	TV miniseries
Sword of Honour	1986	Godfrey	TV miniseries
Nancy Wake	1987	Commissioner	TV miniseries
Phoenix	1993	Ted McKinnon	TV series
Janus	1995	Mr. Hoy	TV series
Blue Heelers	1994	Dr. Fielding	TV series
Good Guys, Bad Guys	1997	Joe Tyson	TV series
SeaChange	1998	Dr. Ashcombe	TV series

== Theatre ==
Title	Year	Role	Type
A Lily for Little India	1966	Alvin Hanker	Stage play
