= Peter Grimes (Wednesday Theatre) =

- Wednesday Theatre episode
- Episode no.: Season 1 Episode 2
- Directed by: Christopher Muir
- Based on: Peter Grimes by Benjamin Britten

Episode chronology
← Previous "The Recruiting Officer"	Next → "Romanoff and Juliet"

"Peter Grimes" is a 1964 television play broadcast by the Australian Broadcasting Corporation. It was based on the opera by Benjamin Britten and directed by Christopher Muir.

It aired as part of Wednesday Theatre.

== Cast ==
- Gloria McDonall as Ellen
- Keith Neilson as Balstrode
- Lauris Elms as Mrs. Sedle

== Production ==
The movie was shot in Melbourne.
