= Fury in Petticoats =

- Ad in The Age 13 Jun 1962
- Based on: play by Elaine Morgan
- Directed by: Christopher Muir
- Country of origin: Australia
- Original language: English

Production
- Running time: 70 mins
- Production company: ABC

Original release
- Network: ABC
- Release: 24 October 1962 (Sydney)
- Release: 13 June 1962 (Melbourne)
- Release: 30 April 1963 (Brisbane)

Fury in Petticoats is a 1962 television play broadcast by the Australian Broadcasting Corporation. It was directed by Christopher Muir. It was based on a play which had been filmed by British TV the year before.

Although fictional, the plot is based on a historical incident in 1836, when naturalist Charles Darwin brought four natives from the island of Tierra del Fuego, at the southernmost tip of South America to England. Some changes were made from historical fact - Fugeia was older than depicted in the play.

== Plot ==
The Reverend William Dill, his wife Augusta and daughter Anne are preparing to meet the curate Edward Parslowe and his friend Charles Darwin for dinner. Edward loves Anne but Augusta wants her daughter to meet Charles Darwin. Darwin talks about a native girl, Fuegia, they have brought back. Anne decides to attempt to convert her to Christianity. (played by Kay Kelton) goes to live in an English country vicarage.

== Cast ==
- Lola Brooks as Anne Dill
- Michael Duffield as Rev. William Dill
- Norman Kaye as Charles Darwin
- Mark Kelly as Edward
- Fay Kelton as Fuegia Basket
- Elizabeth Wing as Mrs. Dill

== Production ==
It was shot in Melbourne.

== Reception ==
The Sydney Morning Herald wrote that:

[It] was an oddly contrived story produced in that stilted solemn atmosphere to which "period" plays often conform. The fact that Charles Darwin once brought a few sad and sorry natives from Terra del Fuego to England could possibly be the basis for a seriously realistic glimpse of early colour problems, or else, perhaps, be artificially brightened into a spirited comedy... Morgan attempted to provide humour and also facile generalisations in a play which neither illuminates nor 'sparkles. The native girl... unconvincingly combined the antics of a savage monkey with an unlikely capacity for sophisticated, fluent reasoning, and the reactions of the prim nineteenth century vicarage were equally unconvincing and lacking in continuity. The actors did not do much to enliven their pasteboard parts, with the exception of Lola Brooks, who managed to bring a sensitive and natural manner to her part.

The Bulletin said it was "a big improvement" on Muir's earlier Boy Around the Corner.

The Age called it "good television... an unpretentious play, well mounted and with straight forward production."
