= Everyman (1964 film) =

- Wynn Roberts, Kevin Colson; The Age 17 Dec 64
- Based on: medieval play Everyman by unknown author
- Music by: John Antill
- Country of origin: Australia
- Original language: English

Production
- Producer: Christopher Muir
- Running time: 60 mins
- Production company: Australian Broadcasting Commission

Original release
- Network: ABC
- Release: 23 December 1964 (Melbourne, Sydney, Brisbane)

Everyman is a 1964 Australian television play. It screened on the ABC and was directed by Christopher Muir, who filmed the whole script.

It was part of the ABC's Christmas programming.

== Plot ==
A pilgrim introduces the story. Death comes to summon Everyman, and Everyman is afraid to go on the journey alone. He tries to negotiate with Death. He realises that except for his Good Deeds, he must face Death alone.

== Cast ==
- Kevin Colson as Everyman
- Wynn Roberts as Death
- Norman Kaye as Discretion
- Patricia Kennedy as Knowledge
- Beverley Dunn as Good Deeds
- Peter Aanensen as Fellowship
- James Lynch as Strength
- Anne Charleston as Beauty
- Gerda Nicolson as Cousin
- Stewart Weller as Goods
- Bruce Barry as Kindred
- Syd Conabere as Confession
- Laurence Beck as Five Wits
- Rex Holdsworth as a pilgrim

== Production ==
It was based on a medieval play from an unknown author. The play was often performed in cathedrals.

Some scenes were shot at St Patrick's Cathedral, Melbourne.
