= Clowning Around =

- Directed by: George Whaley
- Music by: Peter Best
- Countries of origin: Australia; France; United States
- Original language: English

Original release
- Network: Australian Broadcasting Corporation
- Release: 1991

Clowning Around is a 1991 Australian children's series, later edited into a family film, that was shot on location in Perth, Western Australia and Paris, France. It was based on the novel Clowning Sim by David Martin.

The film was produced by independent film company Barron Entertainment Films in Western Australia and educational film company WonderWorks in the United States, was directed by George Whaley. It was distributed by Australian Broadcasting Corporation. It featured Australian actors such as Margaret Williamson, Noni Hazlehurst, Ernie Dingo, Rebecca Smart, and Jill Perryman, and also featured veteran American actor Van Johnson along with French actor Jean-Michel Dagory.

This series was followed up with a sequel entitled Clowning Around 2, which was released in 1993. Both series ran for eight 24-minute episodes, that were later edited into 3-hour television films for international audiences.

== Plot ==
Simon Gunner, is a star-struck foster kid who aspires to become a circus clown. With the help of veteran funster Jack Merrick, Simon ultimately fulfills his goal.

== Cast ==
Main cast

- Clayton Williamson as Simon Gunner
- Ernie Dingo as Jack Merrick
- Rebecca Smart as Linda Crealy (series 1)
- Jean-Michel Dagory as Anatole Tolin
- Van Johnson as Neville Ranthow (series 1)
- Noni Hazlehurst (series 1) and Heather Mitchell (series 2) as Sarah Gunner
- Frederique Fourche as Eve (series 2)
- Margaret Ford as Martha Rathnow (series 2)
- Bill Kerr as Max (series 2)
- Phil Morris as Doozy Jackson (series 2)

Guest cast

- Annie Byron as Una Crealy
- Jill Perryman as Miss Gabhurst
- Steve Jodrell as Skipper Crealy
- Nell Feeney as Lilly
- Isla Fisher as Bec

Heath Ledger also appears as an uncredited extra as a boy in an orphanage.
