= Plain Jane (Wednesday Theatre) =

- Wednesday Theatre episode
- Episode no.: Season 2 Episode 1
- Directed by: Oscar Whitbread
- Teleplay by: Stewart Love
- Original air date: 5 January 1966
- Running time: 50 mins

Episode chronology
← Previous "A Christmas Play"	Next → "Brimstone Butterfly"

"Plain Jane" is a 1966 Australian TV movie. It stars Elspeth Ballantyne and was produced by Oscar Whitbread for the ABC. "Plain Jane" aired on 5 January 1966 in Sydney and Melbourne, and on 25 May 1966 in Brisbane.

It was based on a TV play which had been performed by the BBC in 1963.

== Plot ==
A man, Martin (Martin Magee), gets cold feet on the evening of his wedding to Kathleen. His friends give him advice, including a married couple, Adrian and Myrtle, but he is forced to make his own decision.

== Cast ==
- Elspeth Ballantyne as Kathleen
- Martin Magee as Martin
- Stanley Walsh as Adrian
- Syd Conabere
- Marcus Cooney
- Marion Edward
- Rosemary Gerrette
- Brian Hannan
- Joan Harris
- Paul Karo
- Gerard Kennedy
- John Llewellyn
- Joy Mitchell as Myrtle
- David Telford

== Production ==
It was written by a Belfast school teacher. The play was performed on the BBC two years earlier by Eric Taylor who since joined the ABC. The play was filmed in Melbourne.
