= Black Chiffon =

1959 play written by Lesley Storm

Black Chiffon is a play in two acts written by Lesley Storm. Starring Flora Robson, the play premiered at the Westminster Theatre in London's West End on 3 May 1949, running for over 400 performances. The play debuted on Broadway on 27 September 1950 and ran until 13 January 1951, totalling 109 performances. That production starred Janet Barrow (Nannie), Richard Gale (Roy Christie), Patricia Hicks (Louise), Raymond Huntley (Robert Christie), Anthony Ireland (Dr. Bennett Hawkins), Patricia Marmont (Thea), and Flora Robson (Alicia Christie), and was produced by John Wildberg.

== Synopsis ==
On the eve of her beloved son's society wedding, the highly respected Alicia Christie makes one defiant criminal gesture - a cry for help - when she steals a black chiffon nightdress from a reputable department store. This play is a psychological study of a woman driven finally to the edge due to the cumulative stresses and strains placed upon her by her demanding and divided family. The results are absorbing and deeply moving to witness.

== Radio adaptation ==
Black Chiffon was presented on Theatre Guild on the Air May 10, 1953. The one-hour adaptation starred Burgess Meredith and Judith Anderson.

== TV adaptations ==
Three television adaptations have been made.

=== 1954 US TV adaptation ===
The American adaptation was broadcast on 20 April 1954 as part of ABC's The Motorola Television Hour; the stars were Judith Anderson, Leora Dana, and Martyn Green.

=== 1959 British TV adaptation ===
The British adaptation was broadcast on 4 July 1959 as part of the BBC's 'Saturday Playhouse' series; the stars were Jane Baxter, Ralph Michael and Geoffrey Keen.

=== 1959 Australian TV adaptation ===
Black Chiffon
- Based on: play by Lesley Storm
- Directed by: Christopher Muir
- Country of origin: Australia
- Original language: English

Production
- Running time: 60 mins

Original release
- Network: ABV-2
- Release: 25 February 1959 (Melbourne, live)
- Release: 11 March 1959 (Sydney, taped)

An Australian adaptation aired 25 February 1959 in Melbourne on ABC station ABV-2, a kinescope of the program was shown in Sydney on ABN-2 on 11 March 1959. It was produced by Christopher Muir.

=== Cast ===
- Edward Howell as husband
- Patricia Kennedy as Alicia
- Frank Gatliff as psychiatrist
- Beverley Dunn
- Neil Fitzpatrick
- Margaret Cruickshank
- Molly Gallavan

=== Production ===
Edward Howell had played the role on stage and he travelled from Sydney to Melbourne to appear in the production. It was Howell's seventh television production but his first in Melbourne – all the others had been in Sydney.

It was Patricia Kennedy's fourth TV play. She said during rehearsal that TV acting "still does not give me the satisfaction of theatre, but television is exciting and demanding. I think it is a challenge for actors and the discipline is good."

== See also ==
- List of live television plays broadcast on Australian Broadcasting Corporation (1950s)

== Sources ==
- Black Chiffon at the Internet Broadway Database
- Black Chiffon at BFI
- Black Chiffon 1959 Australian TV play at National Film and Sound Archive
