= The Prophecies of Nostradamus =

- Based on: Nostradamus
- Written by: Alan Hopgood
- Directed by: Paul Drane
- Starring: John Waters
- Narrated by: Kirk Alexander
- Music by: Margaret Byrne
- Country of origin: Australia
- Original language: English

Production
- Producer: Paul Drane
- Cinematography: David Haskins
- Editor: Scott McLennan
- Running time: 96 minutes

Original release
- Network: Seven Network
- Release: 1979

The Prophecies of Nostradamus (also known as The Man Who Saw Tomorrow) is a 1979 Australian made-for-TV documentary film based on the writings of Nostradamus. Produced for (7) Network Australia, the film is hosted by actor John Waters and narrated by Kirk Alexander.
