= Patricia Kennedy (actress) =

Australian actress

Patricia Kennedy OBE
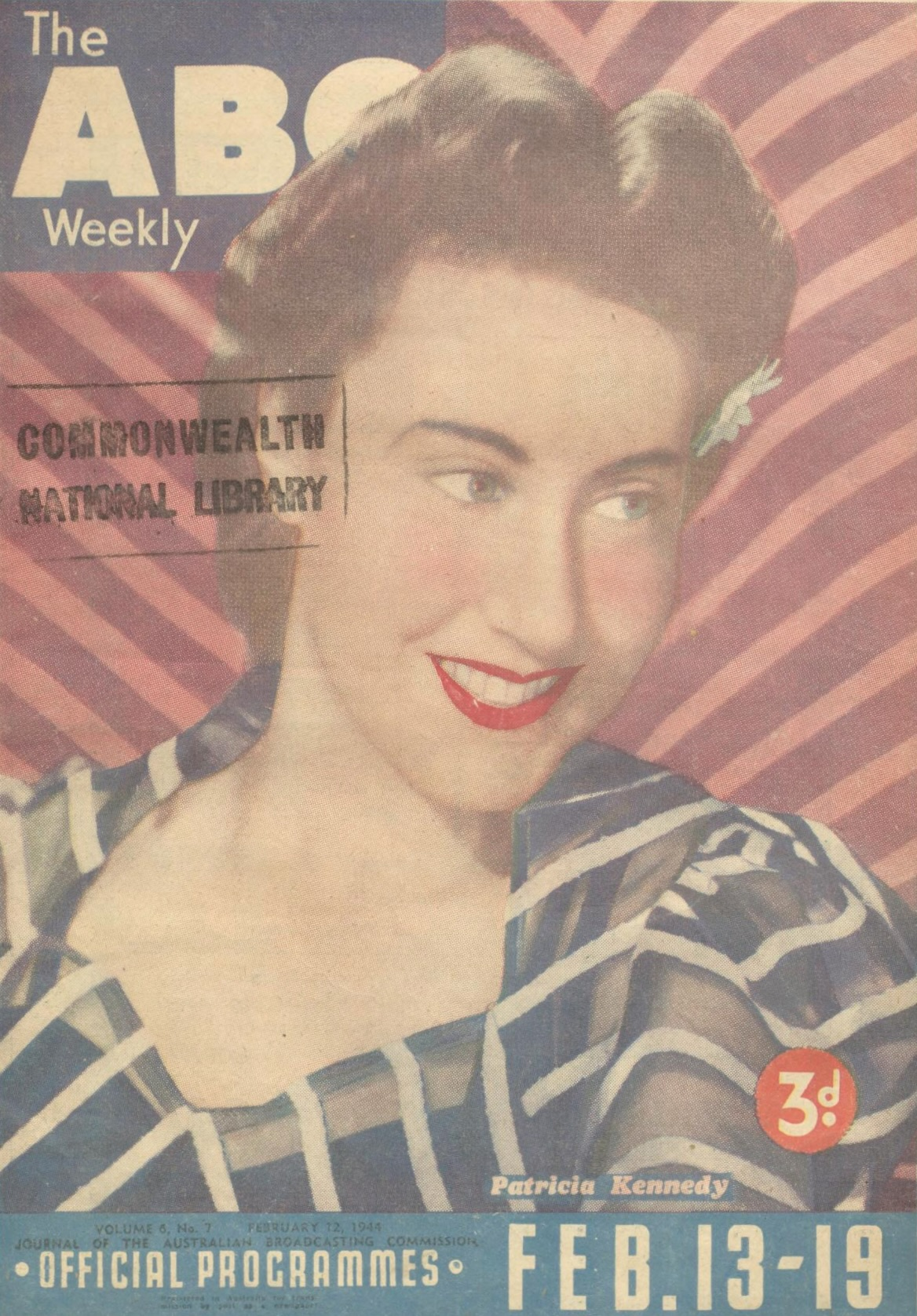
- Kennedy in 1944
- Born: Patricia Carmel Stewart Kennedy; 17 March 1916; Queenscliff, Victoria, Australia
- Died: 10 December 2012 (aged 96); Melbourne, Victoria, Australia
- Education: Teacher
- Occupation: Actress
- Years active: 1938-2001

Patricia Carmel Stewart Kennedy OBE (17 March 1916 – 10 December 2012) was an Australian and Englishactress with a long career in radio, theatre, film and television. According to one writer she was "sometimes called the first lady of Melbourne radio and theatre."

== Early life ==
Kennedy was born in Queenscliff, Victoria on 17 March (St Patrick's Day), 1916 (however, other sources list her year of birth as 1917.) She was raised, and remained, a practising Catholic.

Kennedy moved to Hawthorn in 1925 to undertake her schooling at the Presentation Convent, Windsor, after which, she enrolled at Maie Hoban's School of Drama in East Melbourne.

She trained as a school teacher before winning the Colac Amateur Festival around 1938, which sparked a passion for acting.

== Career ==
=== Theatre ===
She started her stage career in 1943.

Kennedy was noted for her range, spanning from high drama to comedy. She was mainly based in Melbourne, and had a strong association with the Melbourne Theatre Company (MTC), but she also performed in England with the Bristol Old Vic Company's 1969–1970 season.

She appeared in plays such as Jay Presson Allen's adaptation of Muriel Spark's The Prime of Miss Jean Brodie (1968), Ibsen's Ghosts (1969: Mrs Alving), Shakespeare's All's Well That Ends Well, The Man Who Shot the Albatross (1972), and Some of My Best Friends are Women (1976).

Her portrayal of Mary in the South Australian Theatre Company's Melbourne production of Eugene O'Neill's Long Day's Journey into Night was described as "the best female performance on the Melbourne stage in 1973", and that production is considered one of the landmark productions in Australian theatre, largely due to Patricia Kennedy's involvement.

Plays written for Kennedy included the single-hander The Rain by Daniel Keene. She appeared alongside Zoe Caldwell in the MTC's production of Euripides' Medea, the first production at the Arts Centre Melbourne's Playhouse Theatre in 1984.

From 1991 to 1992, Kennedy appeared in a one-woman stage adaptation of Elizabeth Jolley's novel The Newspaper of Claremont Street, staged by the Playbox Theatre Company at a number of venues in Victoria.

Kennedy was still active with the MTC well into her 80s.

=== Radio ===
Kennedy was one of the leading radio actors in Melbourne. Her radio career began when she was discovered by 3UZ drama director Walter Pym at a Sunday night play reading in Melbourne. After winning a Best Actress award for her role in the 3DB series Are You an Actor?, she started securing roles in ABC radio plays.

During World War 2, Kennedy was hired as an ABC announcer, alongside Dorothy Crawford and Mary Ward.

In 1946, Kennedy shared the title role in Crawford Productions' radio drama Melba with singer Glenda Raymond (who later became Hector Crawford's wife). She played Miss Crump on the long-running ABC radio program The Village Glee Club (1942–1971). She also played the title role in Jane Eyre for Lux Radio Theatre, Barbara Brandon in The Reverend Matthew and appeared in episodes of Caltex Theatre.

=== Film and television ===
Kennedy's early television credits included Emergency, Consider Your Verdict and Homicide as well as a number of various tv plays. She went on to appear in Prisoner, Young Ramsay, The Sullivans, The Weekly's War, Five Mile Creek, Return to Eden, The Flying Doctors, G.P. and A Country Practice.

Kennedy played the regular role of Emily Muldoon in early 1980s series Holiday Island. She also appeared in 1984 television movie Kindred Spirits and 1986 miniseries Land of Hope.

Film appearances included The Getting of Wisdom (1977), My Brilliant Career (1979), Country Life (1994) and Road to Nhill (1997).

Kennedy was a drama consultant for the 1982 miniseries Sara Dane.

=== Other endeavours ===
During the 1940s, Kennedy was a member of Actors' Equity of Australia, and was one of the witnesses to the 1949 Victorian Royal Commission Inquiring into the Origins, Aims, Objects and Funds of the Communist Party in Victoria and Other Related Matters where there was possible irregular voting that may have involved Equity and the Communist Party of Australia.

From 1972 to 1973, Kennedy worked as a consultant to the Australia Council for the Arts.

Kennedy was appointed an Officer of the Order of the British Empire in the 1982 New Year Honours, for service to the performing arts.

In the 1990s, Kennedy was involved in founding the Four Winds Festival in Bermagui.

The 'Patricia Kennedy Award', a scholarship named in Kennedy's honour, is awarded to top-performing acting students at the University of Melbourne.

== Personal life and death ==
Kennedy remained single, very private and very independent. Even in her 80s, although she owned a house in Melbourne, she preferred to live alone in a hut without electricity, on the edge of a state forest near Bega in southern New South Wales. This was 5–6 hours drive by road from Melbourne, where she would travel for theatre commitments.

Kennedy died on 10 December 2012, aged 96. A private funeral was held on 19 December.

== Awards ==
Year	Work	Award	Category	Result	Ref.
	Are You an Actor?		Best Actress	Won	
1982	Patricia Kennedy	1982 New Year Honours Order of the British Empire	Service to the Performing Arts	Honoured	

== Filmography ==
=== Film ===
Year	Title	Role	Type
1972	The Office Picnic	Mrs Rourke	Feature film
1977	The Getting of Wisdom	Miss Chapman	Feature film
1979	My Brilliant Career	Aunt Gussie	Feature film
1985	Departure	Sylvia Swift	Feature film
1994	Country Life (adaptation of Uncle Vanya)	Maud Dickens	Feature film
1997	Road to Nhill	Jean	Feature film

=== Television ===
Year	Title	Role	Type
1958	Killer in Close-Up	Mrs Rattenbury	TV play
1958	The Public Prosecutor	Teresia	TV play
1958	The Governess	Ethel Fry	TV play
1958	Wild Life and Christmas Belles		TV play
1959	Emergency	Miss Marshall	1 episode
1959	Black Chiffon	Alicia	TV play
1959	Black Limelight	Mary Harrington	TV play
1959	The House by the Stable	Pride	TV play
1961	Waters of the Moon	Helen Lancaster	TV play
1961	Traveller Without Luggage	The Maid	TV play
1961	The Rivals		TV play
1962	Murder in the Cathedral		TV play
1962	Marriage Lines	Virginia Pilgrim	TV play
1962–1963	Consider Your Verdict	Margaret Kingsley	2 episodes
1964	Everyman	Knowledge	TV play
1964	The Physicists		TV play
1964	Six Characters in Search of an Author	The Mother	TV play
1964; 1972	Homicide	Dame Isobel Stone / Mrs Ryan	2 episodes
1965	Waiting in the Wings	Lotta Bainbridge	TV play
1965	Macbeth	First Witch	TV play
1965	Photo Finish	Stella	TV play
1966	Topaze	Baroness	TV play
1966	Boy with Banner	Mum	TV play
1972	Over There		1 episode
1972	The Man Who Shot the Albatross		TV play
1977	No Room For The Innocent		TV play
1979	Prisoner	Miss McBride	4 episodes
1980	The Franky Doyle Story	Miss McBride	TV movie
1980	The Sullivans	Mother Bernadette	1 episode
1980	Young Ramsay	Elizabeth Turnbull	1 episode
1981–1982	Holiday Island	Emily Muldoon	46 episodes
1983	The Weekly's War	Dame Mary Gilmore	Miniseries
1983	Return to Eden	Kathy Basklain	Miniseries, 2 episodes
1984	Kindred Spirits	Miss Morris	TV movie
1985	Five Mile Creek	Lillie	1 episode
1985	Emmett Stone	Beatrice	Feature film
1986	Land of Hope	Old Maureen Quinn	Miniseries
1988; 1990	The Flying Doctors	Ruth / Edith Cranston	2 episodes
1989	G.P.	Evelyn McLean	1 episode
1993	Johnny Bago	Killer Date	1 episode
1993	A Country Practice	Vera Boardman	2 episodes

== Theatre ==
Year	Title	Role	Type	Ref.
1947	The Merchant of Venice	Portia	St Peters Hall, Eastern Hill with National Theatre	
1947; 1953	Candida	Candida	St Peters Hall, Eastern Hill with National Theatre	
1949	Antigone	Antigone	National Theatre, Melbourne	
1953	After My Fashion	Lady Mary Starcross	University of Melbourne with UTRC	
1955	The Dark is Light Enough	Countess	University of Melbourne with UTRC	
1957–1958	The Chalk Garden	Miss Madrigal	Comedy Theatre, Melbourne, Theatre Royal Sydney, Theatre Royal, Adelaide with J. C. Williamson's	
1959	The Party	Frances Brough	University of Melbourne with UTRC	
1959	Venus Observed	Rosabel Fleming	University of Melbourne with UTRC	
1962	Death of a Salesman	Linda Loman	Emerald Hill Theatre Company	
1965	Farewell, Farewell, Eugene		St Martins Theatre, Melbourne	
1967	A Delicate Balance	Alice	Russell St Theatre, Melbourne with UTRC & Adelaide Teachers College with STCSA	
1967	The Right Honourable Gentleman	Mrs Emilia Pattison	Russell St Theatre, Melbourne, Canberra Theatre with UTRC	
1967	The Golden Legion of Cleaning Women		Adelaide Teachers College with STCSA	
1968	The Crucible		Russell St Theatre, Melbourne, Canberra Theatre, Tasmania with MTC	
1968	The Prime of Miss Jean Brodie		Russell St Theatre, Melbourne with MTC	
1968	The Man in the Glass Booth		Russell St Theatre, Melbourne with MTC	
1968	Three Sisters	Anfisa	Russell St Theatre, Melbourne with MTC	
1968	Everything in the Garden		Russell St Theatre, Melbourne with MTC	
1968	Major Barbara		Russell St Theatre, Melbourne with MTC	
1969–1970	The School for Scandal		Little Theatre, Bristol	
1969–1970	A Delicate Balance		Little Theatre, Bristol	
1969; 1971	Ghosts	Mrs Alving	St Martins Theatre, Melbourne, Theatre Royal, Hobart	
1970	All's Well That Ends Well	Countess of Rossillion	Princess Theatre, Melbourne, Canberra Theatre, Octagon Theatre, Perth with MTC	
1971	The School for Scandal		Theatre Royal, Hobart, Princess Theatre, Launceston	
1971	The Man who Shot the Albatross	Sarah Benson	Australian tour	
1973	Long Day's Journey into Night	Mary Tyrone	University of Adelaide with STCSA, St Martins Theatre, Melbourne with MTC	
1973–1974	The Comedy of Errors		Arts Theatre, Adelaide with STCSA	
1974	An Adelaide Anthology 1836–1900		Edmund Wright House, Adelaide with STCSA	
1976	All Over	The Wife	Nimrod Theatre, Sydney	
1976	Some of My Best Friends are Women		St Martins Theatre, Melbourne with MTC	
1977	All My Sons	Kate Keller	Playhouse, Adelaide with STCSA	
1977	A Place in the Present / Fields of Offerings	Vera Stanton / Ester Azhukov	Playhouse, Adelaide with STCSA	
1978	Echoes		STCSA	
1978	The Glass Menagerie	Amanda Wingfield	Broken Hill & SA tour with STCSA	
1978	1+2 Henry IV	Doll Tearsheet	Playhouse, Adelaide with STCSA	
1978	Hay Fever	Judith Bliss	Canberra Theatre, Sydney Opera House with Old Tote Theatre Company	
1978	Arsenic and Old Lace	Martha Brewster	Melbourne Athenaeum with MTC	
1979	The Day After the Fair	Letty	Comedy Theatre, Melbourne, Theatre Royal Sydney with MLC Theatre Royal Company	
1980–1981	Wings	Emily Stilson	Playbox Theatre, Melbourne, Playhouse, Adelaide	
1982	The Importance of Being Earnest	Lady Bracknell	Marian St Theatre, Sydney, Newcastle Civic Theatre	
1982	Variations	Molly	Nimrod Theatre, Sydney	
1983	A Pair of Claws	Sylvia Swift	Melbourne Athenaeum with MTC	
1984	Medea	The Nurse	Playhouse, Melbourne with MTC	
1987	Salonika	Charlotte	Russell St Theatre, Melbourne with MTC	
1988	Peter and the Wolf	Narrator	Sydney Opera House	
1988	Nutcracker Ballet	Narrator	Sydney Opera House	
1988	Harlequinade	Dame Maud Gosport	Australian tour with Royalty Theatre	
1989	The Best of Friends		Marian St Theatre, Sydney with Northside Theatre Co	
1991	Alive and Kicking	Rebecca	Merlyn Theatre, Melbourne, Monash University, Melbourne with Playbox	
1991–1992	The Newspaper of Claremont Street	Margarite Morris / Weekly	VIC tour with Playbox	
1994	Disturbing the Dust	Alice (Miss Nina)	University of Adelaide for Adelaide Festival, Merlyn Theatre, Melbourne with Playbox	
1997	Aladdin and His Wonderful Lamp	Narrator	Bruce Gordon Theatre, Wollongong with Dance Theatre Victoria	
1998	Amy's View	Evelyn	Playhouse, Melbourne with QTC & MTC	
1999	The Rain	Hanna	La Mama, Melbourne, Beckett Theatre, Melbourne with The Keene / Taylor Theatre Project	
2001	The Twilight Series	Special Guest	Collins St Baptist Church, Melbourne with Playbox	
2001	Kaddish		Span Gallery, Melbourne with The Keene / Taylor Theatre Project	

== Radio ==
Year	Title	Role	Type	Ref.
1938	The Girl with the Tattered Glove			
1941	Shadow and Substance	Brigid	ABC Radio	
1942–1971	The Village Glee Club	Miss Lydia Crump	ABC Radio	
1943	The Better Road		ABC Radio	
1943	The Golden Lover	Tawhai	ABC Radio	
1945	The First Gentleman		ABC Radio	
1946	Melba	Nellie Melba	3DB / 3LK / 2UW / 2KO with Crawford Productions	
1946–	Opera for the People	Mollie Turner	2UW	
1950s	Chequerboard	Mollie Turner		
1950s	The Fire of Etna	Signora Garleone	2SM	
1950s	The Strange House of Jeffrey Marlowe		2UW	
1950s	D24		Crawfords Productions	
1951	Who Goes Home?		Episode of Caltex Theatre on 2GB	
1952	The Enchanted Island		3KZ	
1953	Scrooge the Miser		Episode of Caltex Theatre	
1953	The Gift		Episode of Caltex Theatre	
1950s–1960s	Gulliver's Travels	Signora Garleone	Sub-series of Children's Library of the Air	
1950s–1960s	Life in the Balance			
1956	Forbidden Planet			
1956–1959	The Reverend Matthew	Barbara Brandon		
1979	Kind Hearts and Coronets	Lady Agatha	ABC Radio	
1979	Ubu Roi	Queen Rosamund	ABC Radio	
	Are You an Actor?		3DB	
	Jane Eyre	Jane	Lux Radio Theatre	
	Quality Street	Phoebe	ABC Radio	
	So to Bed	Mrs Pepys	ABC Radio	
	Deirdre of the Sorrows	Deirdre	ABC Radio	
	The Beauty Makers	Miss Shaw		
	David's Children		Crawfords Productions	
	Just Off Fifth	Maud Harwood		
