= The Ambitious Servant Girl =

- Starring: June Bronhill
- Country of origin: Australia
- Original language: English

Production
- Producer: Christopher Muir
- Production company: Australian Broadcasting Commission

Original release
- Release: 1962

The Ambitious Servant Girl is a 1962 TV play broadcast by the Australian Broadcasting Corporation. It was based on Giovanni Battista Pergolesi's opera La serva padrona, and was directed by Christopher Muir. Australian TV drama was relatively rare at the time.

It stars June Bronhill is 40 minutes long. It was shot in Melbourne.
