= Albert Herring (film) =

Albert Herring is a 1959 Australian television play based on Benjamin Britten's opera of the same name. It was broadcast live from Melbourne in 1959 but recorded on tape and repeated in 1960. Leading tenor Victor Franklin had appeared as King Kaspar in a televised production of Menotti's Amahl and the Night Visitors in 1957. Christopher Muir produced and Clive Douglas conducted the Victorian Symphony Orchestra.

== Cast ==
- Victor Franklin as Albert Herring
- Kathleen Goodall as Lady Billows
- Anne Levin as Nancy Waters
- Lynette Martin as Harry
- Keith Neilson as Superintendent of Police
- Lorenzo Nolan as Mayor of Loxford
- Nancy Rasmussen as Emmie
- Justine Rettick as Mrs. Herring
- Neil Warren-Smith as Sid
- Wilma Whitney as Florence Pike
- Barbara Wilson as Mrs. Wordsworth

== See also ==
- List of live television plays broadcast on ABC (1956–1969)
