= Marriage Lines (film) =

- Genre: Comedy-drama
- Based on: Play by Clemence Dane
- Directed by: Christopher Muir
- Country of origin: Australia
- Original language: English

Production
- Producer: Les Bail
- Running time: 60 mins
- Production company: Australian Broadcasting Commission

Original release
- Network: ABC
- Release: 3 October 1962 (Melbourne)
- Release: 26 November 1962 (Sydney)

Marriage Lines is a 1962 Australian television play directed by Christopher Muir.

== Plot ==
Lysette returns to London after three unsuccessful marriages to look up her cousin Virgilia who is married to publisher Felix. Felix runs a business that used to belong to Virgilia's father. Lysette begins an affair with Felix. Robbie Lambert is upset Felix wants to sell his theatre.

== Cast ==
- Walter Sullivan as Felix Pilgrim
- Patricia Kennedy as Virgilia Pilgrim
- Mary Ward as Lysette Eggerton
- Moira Carleton as Chrissie, the Piglrims' maid
- Beverley Dunn as Peggy, Felix's secretary
- Joy Mitchell as Daphne
- Campbell Copelin as Robbie Lambert
- Vernon Yorke as American
- Kurt Ludescher and Ray Angel as waiters
- Roland Heimans as office boy

== Production ==
The play had been filmed by the BBC in 1961. It was an original for television. The play had been performed on Australian radio in 1961.

In discussing why the ABC chose it for production, Filmink magazine hypothesized that "the ABC were attracted by Dane's reputation... The BBC stamp of approval would have helped."

Walter Sullivan travelled to Melbourne to shoot the production. It was Beverly Dunn's first TV play since she returned to Australia. Kennedy appeared by courtesy of Emerald Hill Theatre in Melbourne. Cas Van Puflen designed it.

== Reception ==
The Australian Women's Weekly TV critic called the production "a half-and-half job. Christopher Muir's production was satisfyingly polished; the play itself was woeful. The ABC decided to advertise this offering as a "sophisticated comedy." The theme—one woman trying to snaffle another's husband— can be funny, I suppose. But "Marriage Lines" was a melodrama of mothball manners... the cast had to battle with curiously dated dialogue... [a] sheer waste of good production and a goodish cast. "Marriage Lines" should have been murdered. Preferably at the dress rehearsal, if not before."

Filmink called it "a dreadful play and agonising to watch... all these distinguished actors spitting out upper class dialogue in upper class voices having upper class chats about upper class problems (he’s getting a knighthood, their daughter is having a baby in Kenya, etc, etc) without any wit, insight, tension, freshness or skill. There’s loyal maids and loyal secretaries and everyone discusses how hard poor Felix works while Virgilia clutches her pearls. The jokes die, drama is non-existent, the actors seem embarrassed, the story just seems to end."
