= One in Five =

- Country of origin: Australia
- Original language: English

Production
- Producer: Christopher Muir
- Production company: Australian Broadcasting Commission

Original release
- Network: ABC
- Release: 1962

One in Five is a 1962 television play broadcast by the Australian Broadcasting Corporation. It was a ballet and was directed by Christopher Muir. It had been performed by the Australian ballet.

== Dancers ==
- Marilyn Jones
- Ray Powell
