= Six Characters in Search of an Author (film) =

- Ad The Age 27 Nov 1963
- Based on: play Six Characters in Search of an Author by Luigi Pirandello
- Written by: Phillip Grenville Mann
- Directed by: Christopher Muir
- Country of origin: Australia
- Original language: English

Production
- Running time: 90 mins or 70 mins
- Production company: ABC

Original release
- Release: 27 November 1963 (Melbourne)
- Release: 19 August 1964 (Sydney)

Six Characters in Search of an Author is a 1963 television play broadcast by the Australian Broadcasting Corporation. It was directed by Christopher Muir. It is a production of the play by Luigi Pirandello.

== Premise ==
The show was set in a TV studio during a rehearsal for a new costume serial. Six people arrive, each with a story to tell.

== Cast ==
- Lance Bennett as Fred Parslow
- Cheryl Fisher as the daughter
- Norman Kaye as the father
- Patricia Kennedy as the mother
- Marea Letho as the step daughter
- Michael Norman as the boy
- Terry Norris as Letho

== Production ==
Some scenes were shot at Flinders St Station, Melbourne. йЛЩг

== Reception ==
The Bulletin said it "came up surprisingly well."

The Sydney Morning Herald called it "a stimulating and dramatically rewarding effort."
