= And Here Comes Bucknuckle =

- Written by: Alan Hopgood
- Starring: Peter Curtin; Noni Hazlehurst
- Country of origin: Australia
- Original language: English
- No. of episodes: 6

Original release
- Network: ABC
- Release: 26 January – 31 January 1981

And Here Comes Bucknuckle is a 1981 TV series set in the world of horseracing. It was written by Alan Hopgood and was a sequel to Hopgood's play And the Big Men Fly.

It aired as part of 'Australia Week' on the ABC.

== Cast ==
- Peter Curtin as Achilles Jones
- Noni Hazlehurst as Lil
- Bruce Spence
- John Bluthal as J.J. Forbes
- Reg Evans as Wally Sloss
- Michael Duffield as Colonel Aubrey Mannix
- Denise Drysdale
