= May Hollinworth =

Australian theatrical producer and director

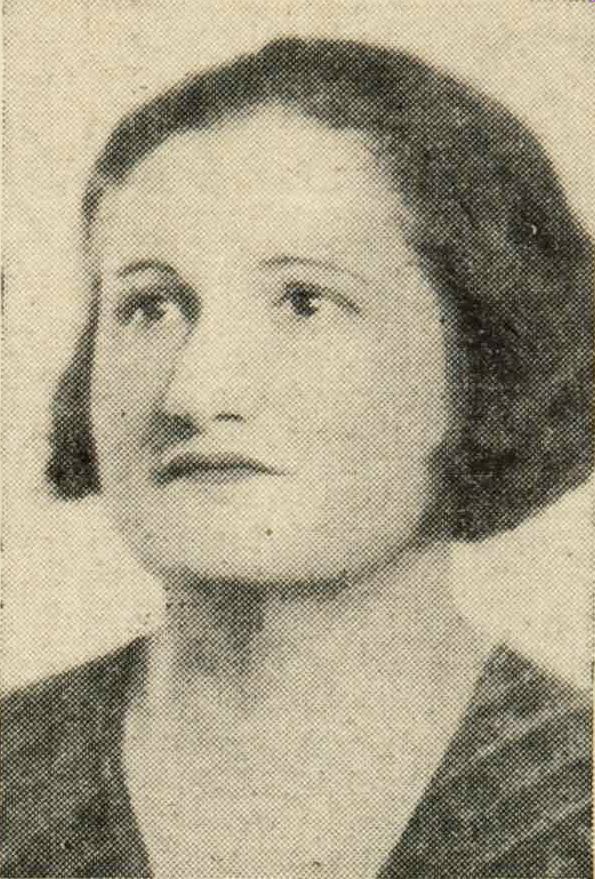
- Born: 1 May 1895; Homebush, New South Wales
- Died: 19 November 1968 (aged 73); Camperdown, New South Wales
- Occupations: Theatre producer; director; actor; company founder of the Metropolitan theatre
- Years active: 1926–1964

May Hollinworth (1 May 1895 – 19 November 1968) was an Australian theatre producer and director, former radio actress, and founder of the Metropolitan Theatre in Sydney. The daughter of a theatrical producer, she was introduced to the theatre at a young age. She graduated with a science degree, and worked in the chemistry department of the University of Sydney, before being appointed as director of the Sydney University Dramatic Society, a post she held from 1929 until 1943

She founded her own company the Metropolitan Theatre, which she directed from 1944 to 1950 in which she presented a range of dramatic works, from Shakespeare and other classics, to contemporary plays from Australia and around the world. She premiered several Australian plays. She retired from the Metropolitan Theatre in 1950 due to illness, but was later invited to direct plays at the Independent Theatre and the Elizabethan Theatre in Sydney. She had a reputation as a superb producer, known for her highly effective use of lighting, and her abilities to arrange actors on stage to convey dramatic meaning visually, to overcome the challenges of large and small stages with minimal facilities, and to select and nurture a cast. Many actors who became notable in Australia and other countries played under her direction at the start of their careers.

== Early life and education ==
Hollinworth was born in the Sydney suburb of Homebush to William Haley Harper Hollinworth, a wool clerk, employee of the Australasian Mortgage and Agency Company, and theatre producer, and his wife Alice Ida Louisa (née Dansie or Dansey). Hollinworth made her first stage appearance at the age of two. While training in dance, she broke a leg, and the injury and subsequent weight gain terminated her aspirations in that field. In 1921, she appeared in a production of Euripides' The Trojan Women staged by Grace Stafford, a prominent teacher of speech and drama. She was also associated with companies led by Australian actor and director Gregan McMahon, English actor-manager Cyril Maude, Australian actor Julius Knight, and English Shakespearean actor Allan Wilkie. She attributed much of her acting ability and production knowledge to the two English actors, and followed the traditions of the Frank Benson school of acting.

Hollinworth was a science graduate, and worked as a demonstrator in chemistry at the University of Sydney. She was also an amateur photographer, and her interest in the theatre developed further through working on the properties of light and colour.

== Career ==
In 1926 and 1927, while employed in the chemistry department at Sydney University, Hollinworth acted in and directed several plays for the Sydney University Dramatic Society (S.U.D.S.) amateur theatre group. In 1927, with Hollinworth directing, S.U.D.S. entered the Sydney Repertory Society One Act Play Competition with The Maker of Dreams by Oliphant Down, and won first prize of £20. Hollinworth also directed the S.U.D.S. in a controversial performance of As You Like It, staged with modern dress and accessories, including a radio (or "wireless") and cigarettes. One review of the production commented that "now and again, 'As You Like It' becomes recognisable through this veil of modern customs and modern manners", but did concede that it had "been handled delicately". The Sydney Morning Herald sought to "defend the modernists against the charge of artistic heresy", pointing out that "On the stage there is no such thing as realism. All is based on illusion." Their reviewer also observed that "the audience, after the initial feeling of strangeness ... were not conscious of any incongruity."

=== Director of the Sydney University Dramatic Society, 1929–1943 ===
In 1929, Hollinworth was appointed director of the Sydney University Dramatic Society, a post she held for fourteen years. Her first production following her appointment was Aristophanes' The Frogs. She selected both classics and contemporary plays from Australia and other countries. Under her direction, the S.U.D.S. received many favourable reviews of their "splendidly mounted productions". They were an amateur drama group, comprising a changing cast of students and some former students, and in some plays their inexperience was noted as lacking animation or not making the lines meaningful.

However, Hollinworth was noted as "a wizard with lighting effects", and for her "ability to translate drama .. into haunting stage action and pictures." She creatively overcame the challenges of the stages available to the group: in tiny theatres, she was able to create an impression of space, while on the large stage of the Sydney University Great Hall, lacking a proscenium or curtains, she used spotlights to concentrate the focus, and gave the role of scene arranger to characters within the play (such as Feste in Twelfth Night), or dressed the stage hands as servants in period costume (as in a 1940 production of School for Scandal).

One reviewer considered that "the society is doing some of the best work by amateurs to be seen in Sydney at present." Another commented, "This clever producer likes something that requires imagination and originality in setting and lighting", while another wondered, "It would be interesting to see what Miss Hollinworth could do with a professional cast – something outstanding is indicated."

In 1943, Hollinworth resigned from the S.U.D.S. Her final production as director of the group was the stage debut of Ned Kelly by Australian poet Douglas Stewart.

==== Selected S.U.D.S. productions ====
Year	Title	Author	Theatre	Reviews
1930	The Thirteenth Chair	Bayard Veiller	Teachers College Hall, University of Sydney	"decidedly attractive .... Hollinworth ... group[ed] and marshall[ed] the actors in a way that was always pictorially effective; ... the general feeling was reposeful, thus throwing into relief the gestures and actions which carried the story forward."
1931	The Last of Mrs. Cheyney	Frederick Lonsdale	The Savoy Theatre, Sydney	"a real success"
1933	L'Aiglon	Edmond Rostand	The Savoy Theatre, Sydney	"Brilliant Production ... The closing scene was outstanding." "May Hollinworth, had much to do with this success, her arrangement of scenes which required many characters on the stage being excellent."
1934	The Piper	Josephine Preston Peabody	New South Wales Conservatorium of Music	"an impressive effect ... The first scene ... was set forth with unusual opulence of colour; some of it contributed by the elaborate costumes which crowded the stage and some by the admirable distribution of the lighting. ... The grouping was always finely balanced and artistic."
1935	As You Like It	Shakespeare	The Savoy Theatre, Sydney	"splendid work, and the applause which followed the final curtain was proof of the audience's appreciation."
1936	Don Juan	James Elroy Fletcher	The Savoy Theatre, Sydney	"a first-rate piece of work."
1937	Twelfth Night	Shakespeare	Great Hall, University of Sydney	"a courageous and worthy experiment ... Visually .. Miss May Hollinworth's presentation must have satisfied the most exacting taste. ... a presentation of a type all too seldom seen in Sydney."
1938	Lucrece	André Obey, translated by Thornton Wilder	S.U.D.S. clubrooms	"One might even call this production distinguished .... one could hardly hope to see it better done .... a very moving performance."
1938	Death Takes a Holiday	Alberto Casella, adapted in English by Walter Ferris	S.U.D.S. clubrooms	"With a clever manipulation of the permanent set, two smallish articles of furniture and ingenious lighting, they have created the illusion of space. .... this production has style".
1938	Hotel Universe	Philip Barry		"Outstanding was the performance of a most unusual play ... Miss Hollinworth is to be congratulated on the highly arresting way in which she unravelled its meaning."
1939	Come of Age	Clemence Dane	S.U.D.S. clubrooms	An "ambitious and difficult" production, "The completeness of the performance, which retained to the end its mystic eerieness, reflected very great credit upon the director, May Hollinworth."
1939	Shallow Cups	Dymphna Cusack	Independent Theatre clubrooms	"An evening of five one-act plays by Australian authors presented by five repertory groups. Shallow Cups .. was certainly the best material in the programme."
1940	The School for Scandal	Richard Brinsley Sheridan	Great Hall, University of Sydney	"a good play well done"; "the groupings of the cast were most artistically arranged and many delectable moments enhanced by the intelligent movement of the players, much of Sheridan's satire was dulled because of the inaudibility of some of the cast."
1940	Fear	Ruth Bedford	New Theatre League (formerly Workers' Art Club)	"at times .. quite a beautiful flow of language ... a remarkably smooth performance, and the producing end was most capably handled by May Hollinworth."
1940	Shadow and Substance	Paul Vincent Carroll		An "electrically charged production ... Miss Hollinworth does a service in putting on such a play ... John Bushelle's Canon ... had a towering stature, at times a terribleness that galvanised the audience. The Brigid of Shiela Sewell ... became a figure of utmost lovely pathos, one of the rare repertory performances of a year."
1940	The Frogs	Aristophanes	Great Hall, University of Sydney	"a large, eloquently conceived, scholarly, worthwhile enterprise"; "The .. stage .. was used to full effect by May Hollinworth ... The visual impression was complex, multifarious and satisfying."
1941	Saturday	Kathleen Carroll	S.U.D.S. clubrooms	An Australian play showing suburban residents engaged in SP betting, including a bank clerk who bets with money stolen from the bank. "The play builds up to a second-act climax of listening-in to the big race and the immediate sequel of the clerk's suicide. ... May Hollinworth's handling of this high spot had such calculated crescendo that, in the tenseness, the cliché of situation took fresh emotional life."
1941	Cousin Muriel	Clemence Dane	Melbourne University Theatre, Melbourne	
1941	Julius Caesar	Shakespeare	Great Hall, University of Sydney	"An outstanding feature of the production was the impressive groupings of the players. May Hollinworth ... handled the movement of the crowd scenes in a manner which emphasised the rising drama of the play."
1942	The Blister	Henrietta Drake-Brockman	Bryant's Playhouse	S.U.D.S. won the Fay Compton Cup for best group performance in the British Drama League annual festival.
1943	The Time of Your Life	William Saroyan		"Out of this material, May Hollinworth made the best production of her career ... It is one problem these days to gather a huge cast; it is another to make them obey the will of the hugely American but also individually Saroyanesque rhythm that haunts this apparently amorphous work and gives it coherence and form. ... Bravo, May Hollinworth!"
1942, 1943	Ned Kelly	Douglas Stewart	S.U.D.S. clubrooms	"one's faith in this richly written play .. is .. re-affirmed by this May Hollinworth production, some scenes in which are very telling indeed. ... With this production, [she] leaves S.U.D.S after many years of fine work."

=== Freelance directing and acting in radio drama ===
During the years in which Hollinworth worked for the Sydney University Dramatic Society, she also directed some other plays on a freelance basis. Among these were Day Must Break, a first play by Scottish-Australian playwright Alexander Connell, presented in 1937 by the J. C. Williamson company at the Theatre Royal. The Sydney Mail announced that Hollinworth would be "the first Australian woman to produce a professional play" at that theatre. A reviewer commented that, while the subject of the play was profound, the plot was flimsy and some of the acting melodramatic; however, Hollinworth "had provided an attractively simple setting".

She formed the Leonardo Theatre Group in 1935, and with them she directed productions of Lucrece (1935) and Beggar on Horseback by George S. Kaufman and Marc Connelly (1935). A Sydney Morning Herald reviewer expressed surprise "that [Beggar on Horseback] reached as high a standard as it did", continuing "Miss May Hollinworth has already given evidence of resourcefulness and imagination as producer for amateurs".

She was the producer of The Thirty-Eight Theatre, an amateur group which formed in 1938, which gave play-readings as well as two stage productions, Dodie Smith's Bonnet Over the Windmill in May 1939, and Rosamond Lehmann's No More Music in August 1939. A review of Bonnet Over the Windmill commented, "Much of the credit for the success of the presentation must go to the producer, May Hollinworth, who, in several recent productions, has proved her ability to handle casts with skill and judgment."

Hollinworth worked with the Impressionist Theatre company, as director or as stage manager, for a number of productions, including Cyrano de Bergerac and Death Takes a Holiday. She also directed pageants for mission societies, Christmas plays and performances by school associations, and, in 1930 and 1934, fundraising performances for what was then called the Sydney Industrial Blind Institution, including a production of Marguerite Dale's play Meet as Lovers.

The Australian Women's Weekly described Hollinworth in 1937 as "among the many well known personalities on the air". From the late 1920s, she had acted in radio dramas broadcast on the Australian Broadcasting Commission's station 2FC. Productions included The Tomb of Osiris by John Pickard in 1929, and The Man Who Stayed at Home by J. E. Harold Terry and Lechmere Worrall in 1931.

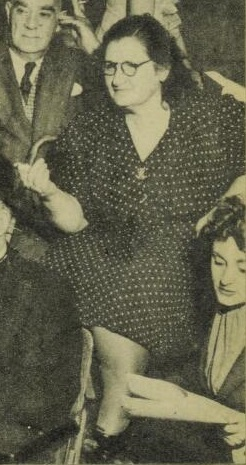
May Hollinworth directing the Metropolitan Players at a rehearsal of Ned Kelly by Douglas Stewart, 1947

=== The Metropolitan Players and the Metropolitan Theatre, 1944–1950 ===
In 1944, Hollinworth founded the Metropolitan Players. Among the founding members were actors who had appeared in Hollinworth S.U.D.S. productions, including Alathea Siddons, a science graduate from Sydney University, who, as a former student, had appeared in The Frogs (1940), Cousin Muriel (1941) and Julius Caesar (1941); Lyndall Barbour; Bruce Beeby; and Kevin Brennan. Others in the first year who later became well-known included Carlotta Kalmar; John Dease; Leo McKern; Jane Holland; and Enid Lorimer.

Their first performances were given to entertain troops at suburban halls and an army hospital. Initially, the Players did not have their own theatre. Performances were held on a subscription basis at a suburban hall in Killara, a suburb on the North Shore of Sydney, where a new amateur theatrical group, the Kuringai Theatre Guild, had just been formed, with O. D. Bisset as chairman. Two early plays, The First Mrs. Fraser and Dangerous Corner, were reported to have audiences numbering 1200 and 1500, respectively.

In 1946, Hollinworth opened the Metropolitan Theatre in an upstairs room in Reiby Place, in the warehouse district of Circular Quay, Sydney, with "an excellent production of Othello. " As the theatre was tiny (it seated seventy), seats were again sold by subscription. Additional performances, open to the public, were given at other venues, often a church hall (also tiny) in the inner Sydney suburb of Darlinghurst.

As at S.U.D.S, Hollinworth presented a range of drama with the Metropolitan Players. She included at least one Australian play each year, including premieres of The First Joanna (winner of the Playwrights' Advisory Board competition) and Douglas Stewart's Shipwreck. She intended to produce all of Shakespeare's major plays, believing that there was no better experience for actors than playing Shakespearian character parts.

During this period, Hollinworth received acknowledgement of her work from reviewers, audience, critics and theatre staff. In 1944, "[at] a luncheon, given by J. C. Williamson's stage manager .. for May Hollinsworth [sic], ... a rare tribute was paid her. Stage hands and cast declared that through her good management it was made the happiest season they had ever played." One reviewer described her in 1945 as "known for her special skill in integrating the broad, thematic currents of a play"; another wrote in 1946, "the Metropolitan is doing some very fine work which deserves attention ... A well-knit team gave a very satisfactory performance ... the numerous small parts were carefully cast and integrated ... the atmosphere of the period and setting was captured." In a 1947 profile of the company, Pix magazine wrote, "May Hollinworth is distinguished in the world of serious theatre. If she were working in England or America, by now she would have won national acclaim. Many people who have worked under her direction have made names for themselves in radio ... Given the chance, Miss Hollinworth and her Metropolitans could contribute on a large scale to our culture." George Johnston in 1947 described Hollinworth as "a woman with sharp eyes, sharp ears, a tongue that can be encouraging or caustic, an apparently inexhaustible fund of energy, a compelling personality", and quoted Professor Alan Stout of Sydney University as saying, "If the Commonwealth Government really wants to get anywhere with a National Theatre, it should choose May Hollinworth . . . who produces the best work in Sydney. She is a superb producer." English journalist David E. Walker described Hollinworth in his book We Went to Australia (1949) as "a large woman with large ideas", and wrote, "Competent and unprejudiced critics have said of .. May Hollinworth, that her productions compare favourably with many that grace Shaftesbury Avenue and New York."

Reviewers did not hesitate to comment on what they considered mistakes, however. Leslie Rees wrote of a performance of Twelfth Night in 1946, "I count it a grave error on Miss Hollinworth's part to require [David Saxby's Sir Andrew] to sustain a monotonous and unfunny falsetto." A Sydney Morning Herald reviewer of Romeo and Juliet in 1949 considered that "Betty Lucas was miscast as Juliet. She spoke in a high-pitched voice which was difficult to follow, and did not convey the innocence, poetry, and freshness of the part."

Several writers lamented the limitations of the Reiby Place venue. In 1947, George Johnston wrote, "May Hollinworth's .. pint-size theatre can be found at the end of some squalid wooden stairs in a building surrounded by waterfront warehouses. It can accommodate only a meagre audience. ... Yet this fragment can see drama equal to some of the best in the world. It can see first-class performances of Shakespeare. It can see plays of W. B. Yeats that otherwise would remain unperformed in this country. It can see such plays as ... Douglas Stewart's own splendid Australian drama, "Ned Kelly", which surely deserved a better premiere than an audience of 70 in an upstairs room overlooking empty garbage-bins, an unlighted lane, and a rather limp-looking hamburger stand." Another reviewer wrote, "May Hollinworth, who has to wrestle with the limitations of a severely cramped stage and a small stuffy room, deserves at least air conditioning, and at best translation to a more spacious and sound-proof realm for the working of her magic unhampered by the noise of dust-bins and by the soporific discomfort of wedged-in humanity."

Despite this, the Metropolitan Theatre was "considered one of the finest training grounds for young artists in Australia". Actors who belonged to the Metropolitan Players during the remaining years of Hollinworth's directorship and later became notable included Betty Lucas, David Cahill, Gerry Duggan, H. G. Kippax, Dinah Shearing, Robin Lovejoy, Redmond Phillips, Richard Meikle, and John Meillon.

Hollinworth had some opportunities to present to larger audiences. In 1944, she directed J. C. Williamson's production of A Midsummer Night's Dream at the Theatre Royal, which was seen by more than 12,000 Sydney children. In 1947, she staged Shakespeare's As You Like It at an open air theatre in a city park in Sydney, to an audience of more than one thousand. The following year, an article about children's theatre in Australia reported that Hollinworth planned to present an annual series of open-air performances in school grounds across Sydney city. George Johnston reported that she planned "to establish a full-time touring repertory company to give performances of the best drama to the school children in New South Wales .. envisag[ing] 84 performances a year to more than 100,000 school children".

While Hollinworth did not fully realise this plan, in 1949, the company toured seventeen towns in northern New South Wales and southern Queensland, performing Twelfth Night at matinees for school students, and The Rivals and Priestley's Laburnum Grove in the evening. Hollinworth hoped that, "In this way, .. theatre will be built in Australia. Not only will interest be stimulated, but a living will be given to our young artists."

In 1949 also, the Metropolitan Theatre moved to new premises in the hall of Christ Church St Laurence, Pitt Street, with a capacity of two hundred seats. This enabled the company to increase its subscription from 1000 to 4000. The first production there was considered by critics as disappointing, due in part to difficulties adapting from a tiny auditorium to a larger one. The next production, the premiere of Douglas Stewart's play Shipwreck, was however considered impressive.

==== Selected Metropolitan productions ====
Year	Title	Author	Theatre	Reviews
1944	On Approval	Frederick Lonsdale	Suburban Sydney halls and Army Hospital, Concord	
1944	The First Mrs. Fraser	St. John Ervine	Suburban Sydney halls and theatres	"a smooth and enjoyable performance"
1944	Dangerous Corner	J. B. Priestley	Killara Memorial Hall	
1944	Uncle Harry	Thomas Job	Killara Memorial Hall; St. John's Hall, Wahroonga	"Producer May Hollinworth wisely saw that the best way to achieve dramatic shock ... was by working on the Edwardian atmospheric realism of the [settings]." "exceptionally good ... in spite of limitations, the producer has successfully conveyed the atmosphere in which Uncle murders his sister."
1945	Suspect	Edward Percy and Reginald Denham	Killara Memorial Hall	"With plenty of scope for a deep undercurrent of suspense, production and acting were both very sound, with Enid Lorimer cleverly cast in the central role."
1945	Housemaster	Ian Hay	Killara Memorial Hall; St. John's Hall, Wahroonga	"a great success"; "The performance, though patchy and often far too slow, was well received by the audience."
1945	Sons of the Morning	Catherine Duncan	Killara Memorial Hall; S.U.D.S. clubrooms	"the thematic threads of idealised love, patriotism, and sacrifice were cleverly integrated into a single coherent skein of poetic ideas by well-judged acting and May Hollinworth's production."
1945	Our Town	Thornton Wilder	Killara Memorial Hall; Mosman Town Hall; private theatre	"a most attractive performance .... May Hollinworth's production was excellent. Her choice of cast, her groupings of character and above all the strategy by which she arranged the play for the tiny stage were exceptionally clever. The wedding and the cemetery scenes in particular were skilfully contrived."
1946	Othello	Shakespeare	Metropolitan Theatre; Killara Memorial Hall; St Peters Church Hall, Darlinghurst	"far and away the finest performance of a Shakespeare play in Sydney for many years. Even that estimate may not do full justice to May Hollinworth's devoted production and some finely tempered acting ... "Othello", as Miss Hollinworth has produced it,' is Shakespeare".
1946	Winterset	Maxwell Anderson	Metropolitan Theatre; St Peters Church Hall, Darlinghurst	"remarkably fine treatment ... Miss Hollinworth ... has dug into the author's true intentions and produced a clear, decisive statement in admirable fashion. ... The play calls for a complex set of cellar and street; and Miss Hollinworth, with surprising success, manages without even a curtain."
1946	Liliom	Ferenc Molnár	Metropolitan Theatre; St Peters Church Hall, Darlinghurst	"courageous ... Some brilliant acting and careful production by May Hollinworth brought a good measure of success in this strange, almost weird, play." "[T]he acting is of a high standard throughout, and the direction is intelligent. ... It is really staggering to see a play of this quality in a tiny hall at Darlinghurst while the big professional theatres show only trivial and meaningless potboilers."
1946	Twelfth Night	Shakespeare	Metropolitan Theatre; St Peters Church Hall, Darlinghurst	"May Hollinworth, in her midget Reiby Place presentations of both Othello and Twelfth Night, has found a vocal pitch and a visual modification which ensure as unstrained and comfortable an experience of Shakespeare as I've known anywhere. Twelfth Night was really a delightful show." "May Hollinworth is a[] .. fine producer, and the play is ... well cast, well played and intelligently presented."
1947	The Country Wife	William Wycherley	Metropolitan Theatre, Reiby Place, Sydney	"May Hollinworth did wonders on her midget stage ... by being amusing and never for a moment sentimentalising [it] did its own lightly moral work of lampooning licentiousness"; "a delightful entertainment. And an illuminating one."
1947	Ned Kelly	Douglas Stewart	Metropolitan Theatre	"an heroic achievement ... The small stage and auditorium impose disabilities which only a gifted and inventive producer could surmount. ... Despite these .. an impressive measure of justice was done to the dramatist."
1947	Lady Windermere's Fan	Oscar Wilde	Metropolitan Theatre	"there were many things to make this revival worth-while. ... May Hollinworth again proved herself able to impose the quality of Style on her little world. The ball scene moved in a kind of slow-motion, allowing every minutest move in the situation to be observed carefully and estimated for its effect by the audience."
1947	Hamlet	William Shakespeare	Metropolitan Theatre	"Shrewdly imaginative qualities in production that brought the story clearly and convincingly into view, and acting that was nourished by alert intelligence ... a performance of real artistic value."
1948	The First Joanna	Dorothy Blewett	Metropolitan Theatre	"The First Joanna ... is written with the excellent intention of making Australians aware of their traditions. Staged by May Hollinworth's Metropolitan Players..., it fulfilled its purpose entertainingly".
1948	A Midsummer Night's Dream	William Shakespeare	Metropolitan Theatre, Killara Memorial Hall	"Midsummer Night's Dream ... came out looking almost bright and new in the current Metropolitan Theatre production. Producer May Hollinworth had a good idea when she used almost untrained tots as assistant fairies. Their spirited spontaneity pointed the tediousness of the usual trained children's ballet."
1948	Love for Love	William Congreve	Metropolitan Theatre, Reiby Place	"a very good performance ... to producer May Hollinworth .. credits for the Olivier-like pace the actors gave their lines with not a word lost to the audience."
1949	The Rivals	Richard Brinsley Sheridan	Tour of south Queensland and northern NSW	"a splendid presentation ... From the principals to the supporting players, the players proved themselves to be artists of more than usual ability"
1949	Romeo and Juliet	William Shakespeare	Metropolitan Theatre, Christ Church St. Laurence Hall, Pitt St, Sydney	"[A] disappointment ... lacks unity of design and current of passion." "[D]esigned for an unramped, ungalleried auditorium; and much of the .. action .. cannot be properly seen ... much of the dialogue .. cannot be clearly understood". "[D]isappointingly presented ... There was a lack of gusto and vitality ... the actors indulged in individual character studies .. without any unifying mind to control aberrations ... The effectiveness of the final tomb scene illustrates the producer's capacity to use light Rembrandt-wise to create a sense of mystery; but for the most part she robbed the production of this invaluable aid."
1949	Shipwreck	Douglas Stewart	Christ Church St. Laurence Hall	"fairly pulsates with life and raw action ... The whole production of this fine new Australian play is capably handled by all concerned; ... and the whole performance shows the firm, intelligent hand of its producer, May Hollinworth."
1949	Heartbreak House	George Bernard Shaw	Christ Church St. Laurence Hall	"The cast chosen by May Hollinworth ... proceed through the marathon conversations dutifully, carefully, and with much stamina. But .. [without] the range of virtuosity to give wing sting or piercing pointedness to the incessant talk. ... [it was] acting below the Metropolitan's best standard".
1950	She Stoops to Conquer	Oliver Goldsmith	Christ Church St. Laurence Hall	"May Hollinworth .. ensured the production would have plenty of visual appeal ... But the action of the comedy was stolid and tiring .... she went too far .. in toning down the comedy." "[D]isappointing. Although well staged and competently directed .. the play fails to engage the audience's attention completely."
1950	The Chinese Lantern	Laurence Housman	Christ Church St. Laurence Hall	"Miss Hollinworth keeps an excellent balance .. between Housman's urge to say something deep and the flippant sentimentalities that keep the profundities smothered. The acting is adequate, the occasional incongruities in it being no more ludicrous than the deliberate incongruities in Housman's writing."

=== Illness, retirement and guest directing ===
Hollinworth became seriously ill during rehearsals for the Metropolitan Theatre's September 1950 production, Raymond, Lord of Milan (which had been published in Sydney in 1851 and produced once, in 1863). She was hospitalised, and forced to hand over direction of the play to its star, Nigel Lovell. Benefit performances for a May Hollinworth Testimonial Fund were held by the Metropolitan Theatre and other Little Theatres. It was hoped that Hollinworth would return to directing the following year; however, her retirement from the Metropolitan Players was permanent.

By 1955, her health had improved, and she was invited to direct at Doris Fitton's Independent Theatre. Among her productions there were Peter Ustinov's The Love Of Four Colonels in 1955 ("producer May Hollinworth back at production after five years of illness and obscurity knew how to win stylish teamwork from resourceful players in loading up and triggering the Ustinov wit"); I Am a Camera, also in 1955 (about which one reviewer wrote "May Hollinworth [..] took over from Miss Fitton when the production was in its early stages. In her own right each is a capable producer but the two styles did not mix, unfortunately, and the result was one of the most mundane productions to come from this theatre for some time"); Tennessee Williams' The Rose Tattoo in 1956 (described as "a most lively and finished production by May Hollinworth, with precision and excellence of detail rare in repertory work"); William Inge's Come Back, Little Sheba in 1957 ("another achievement for May Hollinworth as producer, and an achievement for the well-knit cast ... [they] fully earn the enthusiastic applause and the excellent house"); and Do You Know the Milky Way? by Karl Wittlinger in 1964 ("James Dibble and Robert Levis .... both .. achieved complete credibility in .. a play remarkable for its cohesion all well tended by the producer, Miss May Hollingworth." [sic]

In 1957, Hollinworth was invited by the Australian Elizabethan Theatre Trust to direct the world premiere in Sydney of Richard Beynon's play The Shifting Heart, which had won the 1956 Journalists' Award in Australia, and third prize in the Observer play competition in London. This fully professional production, in which the author played a key role, was considered "close to [a] spectacular success", in which Hollinworth "directed her strong cast with sensitiveness and strength". Hollinworth also directed the play on its Newcastle and Canberra tours the following year; in the latter, a reviewer considered that she "has used pace and vigour to take her through the difficulties in the script, giving a compelling picture of characters in action."

Hollinworth experienced ill health again from 1963, and the 1964 production of Do You Know the Milky Way? was the last that she directed. In her later years, she was patron of the Pocket Playhouse Theatre, Sydenham, adjudicated at the British Drama League Festival, and joined the All Nations Club, which promoted cultural exchange between established and New Australians. In her will, she left her house at Stanmore, "Hollinworth", to what was then the Adult Deaf and Dumb Society of New South Wales (now the Deaf Society of New South Wales).

Hollinworth died in Royal Prince Alfred Hospital, Camperdown, on 19 November 1968; her funeral, according to Anglican rites, was held at the Northern Suburbs Crematorium, Sydney.

== Recognition ==
A bronze plaque commemorating May Hollinworth is affixed to the wall at the site of the Metropolitan Theatre, 1 Loftus Street, Sydney (in the 2010s, the Paragon Hotel).
