= Simone Boccanegra (film) =

Simone Boccanegra is a 1963 Australian television play. It was directed by Christopher Muir. It was based on the opera Simon Boccanegra by Verdi.
