= The Rivals (TV play) =

- Ad in The Age 6 Sept 1961
- Written by: Oriel Gray
- Country of origin: Australia
- Original language: English

Production
- Producer: Christopher Muir
- Running time: 90 mins
- Production company: Australian Broadcasting Commission

Original release
- Release: 6 September 1961 (Melbourne, live)
- Release: 25 October 1961 (Sydney, taped)

The Rivals is a 1961 television play broadcast by the Australian Broadcasting Corporation. It was directed by Christopher Muir. It is a production of The Rivals by Richard Brinsley Sheridan.

== Premise ==
Captain Absolute, son of the wealthy Sir Anthony, poses as a penniless ensign to win the heart of Lydia Languish. Lydia's aunt is negotiating another match.

== Cast ==
- Patricia Kennedy as Mrs Malaprop
- Patsy King as Lydia
- James Bailey as Sir Anthony Absolute
- Fred Parslow as Captain Absolute
- Michael Duffield as Bob Acres
- Anne Charleston as Julia
- George Whaley as Faulkland
- Clement McCallin as Sir Lucius O'Trigger

== Production ==
Rivals.
