= A Christmas Play =

- Wednesday Theatre episode
- Episode no.: Season 1 Episode 48
- Directed by: Brian Faull
- Teleplay by: Carl Orff
- Original air date: 22 December 1965
- Running time: 45 mins

Episode chronology
← Previous "The Search"	Next → "Plain Jane"

"A Christmas Play" is a 1965 Australian television play based on the work by Carl Orff. It aired as an episode of Wednesday Theatre on 22 December 1965 in Sydney and Melbourne.

== Cast ==
- Justine Rettick
- George Whaley
- singers from the Melba Conservatorium, St Paul's Cathedral Boys choir

== Production ==
It was shot in Melbourne. Choreography was by Rex Reid.

That year the ABC also broadcast a ten-minute TV play, The Little Woodcarver written by Keith Smith, about a shepherd boy who lived in the Alps; and An Old Man and Christmas, starring Lou Vernon.

== Reception ==
The Canberra Times said the production "provided a feast for the eye that was not overshadowed by the musical fare. Faull is particularly at home in exploiting the technical resources that television offers."
