= Wal Cherry =

Australian playwright, theatre director, and academic

- Born: Walter John Cherry; 10 May 1932; Ballarat, Victoria, Australia
- Died: 7 March 1986 (aged 53); Boston, Massachusetts, United States
- Education: University of Melbourne
- Occupations: Theatre director; theatre producer; theatre manager; academic; playwright

Walter John Cherry (10 May 1932 – 7 March 1986) was an Australian theatre director, producer, and manager. He was also an academic, playwright, and drama scholar. He was Foundation Chair of Drama at Flinders University in Adelaide from 1967 until around 1980, and also held other positions at the university. Over his career, he directed over 86 performances; wrote a novel and two plays; collaborated on film scripts; published articles and delivered papers in Australia and the United States; and served on many committees.

== Early life and education ==
Walter John Cherry was born on 10 May 1932 in Ballarat, Victoria to Victorian parents Walter Joseph Cherry, a commercial artist, and Vera White.

He attended St. Patricks College in Ballarat, and Geelong High School.

He started studying at the University of Melbourne in 1951, graduating with a Bachelor of Arts in 1954. He was active in student theatre at the university.

== Career ==
In 1956 Cherry became director of the Union Theatre Repertory Company (later Melbourne Theatre Company), where he showcased plays by Bertolt Brecht as well as contemporary British and American playwrights. After undertaking a European study tour in 1957, Cherry resigned from Union Theatre in 1959 and established his own theatre workshop and actors' studio.

Cherry adapted Dorothy Blewett's play The First Joanna for ABC Television, which featured Norman Kaye in the lead role and aired in 1961.

As the co-founder and director of the Emerald Hill Theatre Company in Melbourne, Victoria in 1962, Cherry gained a reputation in the early 1960s for innovative programming and bold productions, particularly of Australian plays. Along with George Whaley, he experimented with different acting forms and approaches to theatre, After encountering financial difficulties, the company closed in 1966; however it had inspired a "new wave" of Australian theatre, which grew in Sydney and Melbourne from the late 1960s.

In 1967, Cherry was appointed to the Foundation Chair of Drama at the recently created Flinders University in Adelaide, South Australia. He also chaired the school of language and literature (which became the school of humanities) from 1968 to 1970, and the theatre management committee in from 1968 until 1978, and was dean of University Hall (hall of residence) in from 1970 to 1974. Flinders Drama Centre now has an international reputation, with many successful actors, directors, and playwrights among its alumni of the centre.

While at Flinders, Cherry continued his contribution to professional Australian theatre off-campus. He was a key member of the board of the nascent South Australian Theatre Company (later State Theatre Company of South Australia). In that position, he drove significant changes in the direction of the company, but his objective of a continuing close link between the SATC and the Flinders Drama Department was never realised. He also continued to direct for various companies, including a notable production of Jean-Paul Sartre's Kean for the SATC in 1970. On-campus, in 1971-2 he wrote and directed a play, Horrie's Alibi, with a student cast augmented by a number of professional actors. This production also toured Israel, playing at a number of kibbutzim as a cultural exchange under the auspices of the Israeli Government.

In 1980, Cherry took up an appointment as chairman of the Theater Department and Professor of Theater at Temple University, Philadelphia. In 1985, he was appointed as associate director of the Boston Shakespeare Company.

Cherry directed at least 86 performances of various types; wrote a novel and two plays; collaborated on film scripts; published articles and delivered papers in Australia and the United States; and served on over 30 committees.

== Recognition and awards ==
Cherry won the 1958 and 1961 Erik Awards in Melbourne and the 1959 Western Australian General Motors Holden award for best production.

He travelled to the US on Fulbright fellowships in 1972 and 1976, and to Japan on a fellowship from the Cultural and Social Centre for the Asia-Pacific Region in 1973.

== Personal life ==
Cherry married Marcelle Lynette (Peg) Mathieson, a schoolteacher, in 1956 in Geelong. They have two daughters.

== Death and legacy ==
Cherry died in Boston, Massachusetts in March 1986, aged 53, of ischemic heart disease.

In his memory, the Play of the Year Award for Best Unproduced Play was established by the Victorian Arts Centre in 1989.

Flinders University holds a biennial Wal Cherry Lecture. In 2024, Scott Hicks' 1982 documentary film about the 11th Adelaide Festival of the Arts under artistic director, Jim Sharman, titled The Hall of Mirrors: A Festival, was screened at the Space Theatre in the Adelaide Festival Centre, followed by a conversation with the two men. In 2024, the lecture was presented by the Assemblage Centre for Creative Arts at Flinders, in partnership with the Helpmann Academy and the Don Dunstan Foundation.

== Selected works ==
- Martine (1961)
- Waters of the Moon (1961)
- The First Joanna (1961 screenplay)
