= A Piece of Ribbon =

- Advertisement in The Age 10 July 1963
- Based on: play by Leslie Thomas
- Starring: Elspeth Ballantyne, Dennis Miller
- Country of origin: Australia
- Original language: English

Production
- Producer: Christopher Muir
- Running time: 60 mins
- Production company: Australian Broadcasting Commission

Original release
- Network: ABC
- Release: 10 July 1963 (Melbourne)
- Release: 24 July 1963 (Sydney)

A Piece of Ribbon is a 1963 Australian television play filmed. It was based on an English TV play by Leslie Thomas that had already been performed by the BBC.

It was filmed in Melbourne and was directed by Christopher Muir. Beach scenes were shot in Beaumaris, Victoria.

Although based on a British script it is the only Australian made television drama set during the Malayan Emergency.

== Plot ==
During the Malayan Emergency, British soldiers are having a break from jungle patrol at a Malay Beach Club House. Several of them are attracted to a Eurasian girl, Marianna de Souza, who is there to meet her boyfriend Corporal Cutliffe. He arranges to meet Marianna later at a beach.

Marianna is found murdered. Investigations into her death are cut short when the company is sent out on patrol under Sergeant Wiley.

== Cast ==
- Neville Thurgood as Sgt Wiley
- Jeffrey Hodgson
- Heather Leembruggen as Marianna de Souza
- Geoffrey Hodgson as Corporal Cutliffe
- George Whaley
- Roly Barlee
- Terry Beattie
- Kurt Beimel
- Robin Farquhar
- Joseph Gentile
- Charles Haggith
- Max Horder
- Paul Karo
- Dennis Miller
- Alwyn Owen
- Joseph Szabo
- Christine Veld

== Production ==
There was a cast of 25 including five models from the Mannequin and Models Guild. The producers shot scenes for the beach at Beaumauris. Heather Leembruggen was from Sri Lanka. The set was designed by Kevin Bartlett.

== Reception ==
The Bulletin said the cast, "with one minor exception", were believable as British soldiers.

Filminkg called it "a very good production."

== See also ==
- List of television plays broadcast on Australian Broadcasting Corporation (1960s)
