= Private Yuk Objects =

Play written by Alan Hopgood

- Original language: English
- Written by: Alan Hopgood
- Subject: Vietnam War
- Genre: Comedy

Premiere
- Date: 6 September 1966
- Place: Russell Street Theatre, Melbourne
- Directed by: John Sumner

Private Yuk Objects is a 1966 Australian play about the Vietnam War. It is allegedly the first play in the world on that topic.

"I did not choose the subject for its sensational value," said Hopgood who added the play "does not take political sides. I don't think that's the job of the playwright. My intention is to record how anger and other government reactions can be manipulated and by government action, softened and made to lose their force."

It was the first play to be commissioned by the Australian Elizabethan Theatre Trust. Hopgood wrote it in March 1965, being inspired by newspaper accounts of two American soldiers who had been held hostage by the Viet Cong for two years and become peace advocates. Then when Australia became involved in the war he started writing from the Australian point of view. Hopgood worked on the play over the next five months. "The Vietnam War is the first war Australia has been involved with which doesn't have clearcut issues. The issues are muddy. I'm trying to examine the Australian character under stress."

"I try to tap into a current passion," said Hopgood. "Vietnam is hot topical stuff. From a humanitarian view, this is one of the muddiest issues in which we have ever been involved as a nation."

== Premise ==
An Australian family is split by the Vietnam War.

== Reception ==
Leslie Rees wrote "Theatrically its humorous or piquant approaches had unpredictable gusto; and often it was thrusting in its arguments while not adding to the stockpile on Vietnam, pro and con. I did not think that Alan Hopgood had any serious convictions about Vietnam, other than the conviction that the subject should be discussed. The emotional scenes failed. The city family were wooden stock types and the Dad and Dave intruders mere cartoons."

The Sydney Morning Herald wrote the "characters are comic strip stereotypes" where "one character after another makes very long speeches."

The play drew poor houses in Sydney and Melbourne. The production lost the trust $13,302.
