= And the Big Men Fly =

1963 Australian play by Alan Hopgood

And The Big Men Fly
- Author: Alan Hopgood
- Language: English
- Subject: Australian Football League
- Genre: Sport plays
- Publisher: Heinemann
- Publication date: 1st Edition: 1963; 2nd Edition: 1988
- Publication place: Australia
- Media type: Print (Paperback)
- ISBN: 0-85859-494-3
- OCLC: 29319909

And the Big Men Fly is an Australia-based play by Alan Hopgood, written in 1963, and has been adapted to numerous media including a TV series and film.

Its primary subject is a fictional Australian rules football team, the Crows (note: the term predated the Adelaide Crows, which was founded in 1990).

== Plot summary ==
The coach of the Crows football team, J.J. Forbes, sends his assistant, Wally, out to find a new player for the big season championship which was to start in 2 weeks. J.J thought that they would never have a chance, as Wally couldn't seem to find anyone with some decent talent.

J.J was getting very upset at Wally and told him on the phone to do anything to get someone, as he says, "I don't care if you have to rewrite the law books. That's what we put you through university for!" A little while later, Wally bursts into the room yelling and screaming. "J.J… I've got him! I've got him! Oh, you've never seen anything like him, he's beautiful, he's a Greek god." At this point, J.J starts to think that Wally has gone mad and needs to see a psychiatrist.

Wally is trying to convince J.J that this player, Achilles Jones, can kick a wheat bag 10 yards. J.J doesn't believe Wally at first, but thinks that he has nothing to lose so they decide to go and meet Achilles They drive all the way out to Manangatang, where this Achilles lives, and J.J finally gets to meet him. At first, things are a bit stressful as Achilles gets the shotgun out and threatens to kill them when they arrive. They try convincing Achilles to come and play football for the Crows but Achilles is just too happy where he is and won't go anywhere. J.J and Wally aren't happy, so they decide that they are going to get Achilles to play by bribing his partner, Lil, with gifts and getting her to convince Achilles to try it out and play a few games. To start with convincing Lil, they tell her that she will get all sorts of nice things and they even give her a fur coat. They end up telling Achilles that the Williamses – Achilles' neighbors and worst enemies – think that he would never be able to play football in his life, so he decides that he will go and play for the Crows, only so he can show the Williamses that he can play and that he is better than them.

Once Achilles arrives in Melbourne, he is taught the rules of the game and does private training. He is kept private from the public as Wally and J.J want to make a big showcase on the first day of the football championship. In the first game of the championship, Achilles takes to the field but does nothing. J.J and Wally start to get very stressed out and worried that he won't do anything, until J.J sends Wally out onto the field to see what was wrong with him and found out that it was partly because he was wearing football boots, which he much disliked, and partly because Achilles can't play or kick when he's not angry. J.J then told Wally to send Lil out onto the field and make up a story about the Williamses so that he would get all angry and start to run and kick the ball around.

This continues every week of the championship. Lil has to keep making up stories, and lying to Achilles that the Williamses were being unkind. He does this in order that Achilles plays football.

Just before the season had begun, Wobbly Coates and J.J made a public bet on the radio over their yearly wages that the Crows wouldn't get into the championship grand final and win, as they haven't done for the past 30 years. Near the end of the season, Wobbly realises that he is going to lose this bet if he doesn't do something to stop Achilles from playing the grand final, so he rang up the Williamses and told them that Achilles had been saying lots of bad stuff about them and their farm. This then set the Williamses off, and they went to fight him. This plan by Wobbly had already been working excellently as he wanted to tire Achilles out before the big game so that he couldn't play. The fight between the Williamses and Achilles went on for three days straight, but Achilles was still pushing on strong for the grand final match.

On the night before the big game, Les Williams gave up and decided that he didn't want to fight anymore – this is when Achilles found out that his best mate, Milly the horse, had died back at home on the farm. Les and Achilles decide to come together inside and have a cup of tea and decide that they are going to stop all of this nonsense between the two of them.

Achilles doesn't want to play the game when he gets to the field on the big day, but luckily enough, Les Williams heard on the radio who rang him up and told him all the lies – it was Wobbly Coates. This report got Achilles playing the game for a while.

As the game nears the end, Achilles has to make a decision whether he is going to win the game or make them lose. He thinks about it and suddenly decides that he is going to get the score even, and then kicks the ball straight up into the commentary box where Wobbly Coates is sitting, and hopefully, it hits him and injures him. This decision was going to be his payback for all of the lies that he had told Les Williams.

The grand final game ends in a draw and is rescheduled to next week without the participation of the new team recruit, Achilles. He then decides that he is going to live back on the farm with Lil and spend a lot more time with her.

=== Cast (stage) ===
- Elspeth Ballantyne as Lil
- Jane Bertelsen
- Simon Chilvers
- Paul Eddey
- Brian Harold
- Alan Hopgood
- Paul Karo
- Dennis Miller as Achilles Jones
- Leslie Wright

=== Production history ===
In 1963 the Melbourne Theatre Company had scheduled The Man Who Came to Dinner with Frank Thring and Alan Hopgood, which was expected to run for months at the Russell Street Theatre. However the play bombed unexpectedly and MTC director John Sumner needed a replacement. He asked Hopgood if he had any plays and Hopgood wrote And the Big Men Fly in a week. The play had its world premiere at Russell St Theatre in Melbourne in 1963. Hopgood himself played Forbes, while Dennis Miller played Jones.

The play was filmed for television in 1963.

The play was presented again in 1988 with Hopgood reprising the role of Forbes and Simon Chivers as Head. Jones was played by Shane Connor and Lil was played by Elaine Smith.

It educated my two kids, said Hopgood later. It was made into a TV mini-series and almost 250,000 copies of the script have been sold since.

== 1963 TV Movie ==
And the Big Men Fly
- Genre: comedy
- Based on: Play by Alan Hopgood
- Directed by: Rod Kinnear
- Starring: Dennis Miller
- Country of origin: Australia
- Original language: English

Production
- Running time: 90 mins

Original release
- Network: Nine Network
- Release: 5 October 1963

The play was very popular in its initial run and was filmed for Australian TV by Nine Network in Melbourne.

It was broadcast on 5 October 1963 the night of the 1963 VFL Grand Final.

The cast were substantially the same as for the original theatre production.

It is not clear if the production was broadcast in other cities.

=== Cast ===
- Alan Hopgood as J.J. Forbes
- Paul Karo as Wally Sloss
- Dennis Miller as Achilles Jones
- Elspeth Ballantyne / Diane Craig as Lil
- Simon Chilvers as Harry Head
- Maurie Fields as Merv Harvey
- Paul Eddey as Wobbley Coates
- Leslie Wright as Les Williams
- Jane Bertelsen as Television employee
- Brian Harold as Television employee

=== Reception ===
The Age said it "did not turn out to be the big laugh... it was on stage... it just... fizzled.... a reminder that a success on stage does not necessarily qualify for a production for TV and vice versa. Performances obviously needed polishing up... The production, in fact, called for more than the physical transfer it was. This might have helped put over the 'home truths' of the play to the non-captive TV audience."

== 1974 TV series ==
And the Big Men Fly
- Genre: comedy
- Written by: Alan Hopgood
- Directed by: Keith Wilkes
- Country of origin: Australia
- Original language: English
- No. of episodes: 6

Production
- Producer: Oscar Whitbread
- Running time: 30 mins

Original release
- Network: ABC
- Release: 28 July 1974 – 1974

The play was adapted into a TV series in 1974.

Copies of episodes are available at the National Archives of Australia. Scripts are at the National Film and Sound Archive.

=== Cast ===
- John Hargreaves as Achilles Jones
- Diane Craig as Lil
- Frank Wilson as J.J. Forbes
- Reg Evans as Wally Sloss
- George Mallaby as Jack Drew
- Barry McQueen as Harry Head
- Colin McEwan as Wobbly Coates
- Dennis Miller as Moola Barnes
- Jack Perry as Les Williams
- Terry Gill as Peter Williams
- Ivor Bowyer as Willy Williams
- Diane Lewis as Miss Terious
- Maurie Fields as Merv Harvey
- Peter Aanensen as Alby
- Rosie Sturgess as Miss Turner
- Noel Browne as Zanecchi
- Sue McIntosh as Hostess
- Joan Letch as Miss Turnibread

=== Sequel ===
It led to a sequel And Here Comes Bucknuckle (1981).

== See also ==
- Australian rules football in Australian popular culture
