= The Recruiting Officer (Wednesday Theatre) =

- Wednesday Theatre episode
- SMH 6 Jan 1965
- Episode no.: Season 1 Episode 1
- Directed by: Ken Hannam
- Based on: The Recruiting Officer by George Farquhar
- Original air date: 6 January 1965
- Running time: 100 mins

Guest appearances
- John Meillon; Reg Livermore

Episode chronology
← Previous —	Next → "Peter Grimes"

"The Recruiting Officer" is a 1965 Australian television production based on the famous play The Recruiting Officer, which was the first play ever performed in Australia. The Recruiting Officer aired on 6 January 1965 in Sydney, 13 January 1965 in Brisbane, and on 20 January 1965 in Melbourne.

The production was the first episode of the ABC anthology series Wednesday Theatre and starred John Meillon, and was directed by Ken Hannam.

== Premise ==
Two recruiting officers, Plume and Brazen, visit a country district and become involved with Plume's childhood friend, Worthy, and two beautiful women, Sylvia and Melinda.

== Cast ==
- John Meillon as Plume
- Reg Livermore as Brazen
- Tony Ward as Squire Worthy
- Edward Hepple as Sergeant
- Anna Volska as Sylvia
- Noeline Brown as Melinda
- Arelen Dorgan as the wench
- Yvonne Matthews as Lucy
- Ronald Morse as a Judge
- Don Pascoe as a yokel
- Stewart Finch as a yokel
- Mark Edwards

== Production ==
The original play was the first play to be staged in the Colony of New South Wales, which is now Australia, by the convicts of the First Fleet on 4 June 1789 under the governance of Captain Arthur Phillip. It was performed to honour the king's birthday. The play was based on Farqhuar's experience recruiting in Shropshire during the War of Spanish Succession.

The play had recently been revived in the public consciousness after being performed at the National Theatre in London in 1963.

In 1964, when the play was shot, it was compared to the movie Tom Jones (1963).

John Meillon made it after returning home after five years in London. "I would think this play was the best ever produced in Australia", said Meillon. "It would stand on its merits anywhere."

It was one of the most elaborate productions shot on Australian TV until that time. It was filmed in 1964 but screening was delayed until after a Senate election because of the title, and conscription had been an issue in the election.

Sets and costumes were designed by Wendy Dickson of the Elizabethan Theatre Trust. Two studios were used. The sets involved building a complete market place, containing a courthouse, inn and stocks. More than 30 costumes were made.

Reg Livermore wrote in his memoirs that rehearsals took place in premises in Lower Forbes St, near Kings Cross. He says whenever Meillion had a break in dialogue, he would leave to visit the pub, but "he always returned in time". Livermore says Meillon's performance "was lively, nonetheless, as was he, a jovial, likable chum."

== Reception ==
The Sydney Morning Herald said "The happy turns and twists of its plot and its unrestrained, exuberant dialogue were skillfully brought within the television frame, enabling the notably able cast to show off a variety of nimble expressions" adding "This was a good-tempered and affable production" with "some delightful acting and resourceful use of visual details."

The Canberra Times said Meillon made "a display of naturalistic acting of such excellence that there was excitement in the sheer realism of his gesture and inflection. But the 100 minute production left an after taste of such dissatisfaction that the inevitable first question was, do I want naturalistic acting in Restoration comedy?"

The Sydney Tribune said it was the "highlight of the week".
