= The Bloodless Sand =

- Starring: Paul Hammond
- Country of origin: Australia
- Original language: English

Production
- Producer: Christopher Muir
- Production company: Australian Broadcasting Commission

Original release
- Release: 18 October 1964

The Bloodless Sand is a 1964 TV play broadcast by the Australian Broadcasting Corporation. It was a ballet and was directed by Christopher Muir. Australian TV drama was relatively rare at the time.

== Premise ==
A Spanish maid is in love with a matador.

== Cast ==
- Patricia Cox
- Paul Hammond
- Vlado Juras
- Eileen Wilson
