= Alan Hopgood =

Australian actor (1934–2022)

Alan Hopgood AM
- Alan Hopgood as Wally Wallace in TV series "Prisoner"
- Born: Alan John Hopgood; 29 September 1934; Launceston, Tasmania, Australia
- Died: 19 March 2022 (aged 87); Melbourne, Victoria, Australia
- Occupations: Actor; producer; playwright and dramatist; screenwriter; librettist; publisher; lecturer
- Years active: 1940–2014

Alan John Hopgood AM (29 September 1934 – 19 March 2022), also known as Alan Hopwood, was an Australian actor, producer, and writer. He wrote the screenplay for the 1972 film Alvin Purple and made appearances in television shows such as Bellbird, Prisoner and Neighbours.

== Early life ==
Hopgood was born in Launceston, Tasmania, and grew up in the state. He acted in several dramatic roles in his childhood, making his legimiate debut aged 12 in The Winslow Boy in Hobart.

He attended school in Melbourne as a boarder at Wesley Collect. HE studied at the University of Melbourne, graduating with a Bachelor of Arts (Hon) and a Diploma of Education.

His first play, Marcus, was produced at Melbourne University while he was working as a school teacher. He left teaching to write full-time and start his acting career.

== Career ==
=== Scriptwriting and screenwriting ===
Hopgood's first successful play, And the Big Men Fly, was about Australian rules football and was produced in 1963 by the Union Theatre Repertory Company at the Russell Street Theatre in Melbourne with scripts by Brad Hopgood. The play was adapted for TV by the Australian Broadcasting Corporation in 1973 and also a telemovie. In 1964, he followed with The Golden Legion of Cleaning Women. In 1966 he produced Private Yuk Objects, which he said was the first play anywhere in the world on the subject of the Vietnam War.

Hopgood has also written a number of film and television screenplays, including the comedy film Alvin Purple (1973), which was the most commercially successful Australian film of the early 1970s.

=== Screen actor: Television and film ===
Hopgood was an actor with the Melbourne Theatre Company for ten years and was an early 'soap' star in Bellbird, in which for six years he played the town doctor. He has also performed in the later soaps, Prisoner (for which he also scripted many episodes) and Neighbours as Jack Lassiter (a role he reprised in August 2013).

As an actor, his cinema credits include My Brilliant Career (1979), The Blue Lagoon (1980), Roadgames (1981), Evil Angels (1988, released as A Cry in the Dark outside of Australia and New Zealand) and The Man from Snowy River II (1988).

He worked with a large number of actors including Frank Thring, Meryl Streep, Brooke Shields, Sam Neill and Judy Davis.

In late 2021, Hopgood appeared in an exclusive interview for the official YouTube channel Talking Prisoner, in which he discussed his life and career. The episode was published in January 2022.

== Honours ==
Hopgood won AWGIE awards for The Cheerful Cuckold and The Bush Bunch and writing several feature films including Alvin Purple and the documentaries The Prophecies of Nostradamus and The Fountain of Youth.

Hopgood was awarded the A.M. (Member of the Order of Australia) in 2005 for his services to the performing arts as an actor, playwright and producer, and to the community through raising awareness of men's health issues.

== Personal life ==
Hopgood resided in Melbourne with his wife Gay, with whom he had two children (Fincina and Sam), and four grandchildren (Jackson, Harrison, Ashwyn and Darcy).

== Health issues and death ==
Alan Hopgood developed prostate cancer and published a book on the experience titled Surviving Prostate Cancer: One Man's Journey, which was widely praised. He often toured giving humorous lectures on men's health issues.

Hopgood died from prostate cancer at the age of 87 on 19 March 2022 at a hospital in Melbourne.

== Filmography ==
=== Film ===
| Year | Title | Role | Type |
|---|---|---|---|
| 1959 | Tragedy in a Temporary Town | McCarthy | TV movie |
| 1969 | Dynasty | Jacob Goldberg | TV movie |
| 1959 | Antony and Cleopatra | First Soldier | TV movie |
| 1959 | Ned Kelly | Dan Kelly | TV movie |
| 1960 | Man in a Blue Vase | Aaron | TV movie |
| 1960 | The Astronauts | Dave Armstrong | TV movie |
| 1960 | Who Killed Kovali? | Jeff Willis | TV movie |
| 1962 | The Teeth of the Wind | Frank Andrews | TV movie |
| 1962 | She'll Be Alright | | TV movie |
| 1962 | You Can't Win 'Em All | Feliz | TV movie |
| 1962 | Lola Montez | Smith | TV movie |
| 1963 | Night Stop | Gary | TV movie |
| 1963 | And The Big Men Fly | JJ Forbes | TV movie |
| 1969 | The Cheerful Cuckold | Gareth | TV movie |
| 1969 | The Torrents | | TV movie |
| 1977 | The Trial of Ned Kelly | Narrator | TV movie |
| 1979 | My Brilliant Career | Father | Feature film |
| 1979 | Burn the Butterflies | | TV movie |
| 1980 | The Blue Lagoon | Captain | Feature film |
| 1980 | The Quick Brown Fox | Marley Powers | Short film |
| 1980 | The Coast Town Kids | Mick James | TV movie |
| 1980 | Pacific Banana | Sir Harry Blandings | Feature film |
| 1981 | Roadgames | Lester | Feature film |
| 1982 | A Shifting Dreaming | | TV movie |
| 1983 | A Slice of Life | Dr. Williams | Feature film |
| 1985 | Emerging | Tom Birchfield | TV movie |
| 1987 | Ground Zero | Commissioner #2 | Feature film |
| 1988 | Return to Snowy River | Simmons | Feature film |
| 1988 | Rikky and Pete | Laughing Uncle | Feature film |
| 1988 | A Cry in the Dark (aka Evil Angels) | President Cox | Feature film |
| 1996 | Hotel de Love | Ronnie | Feature film |
| 1998 | Two Girls and a Baby | Catherine's Dad | Short film |
| 2002 | Dalkeith | Mick | Feature film |
| 2004 | The Gift | Man on Bus | Short film |
| 2004 | Stiff | Herb Gardiner | TV movie |
| 2009 | Knowing | Reverend Koestler | Feature film |
| 2011 | Magic | Grandfather | |
| 2011 | The Cup | Grandfather at Football | Feature film |
| 2012 | The Game | Charles | Short film |
| 2012 | Last Dance | Mr. Nathan | Feature film |

=== Television ===
| Year | Title | Role | Type |
|---|---|---|---|
| 1972–77 | Bellbird | Dr. Matthew Reed | TV series |
| 1973–74 | Matlock Police | 3 roles -Frank Walsh -Ted Reid -Brian Davis | TV series |
| 1973–1975 | Homicide | 3 roles -John Ford -Paul Markes -Jim Knight | TV series |
| 1978–80 | Cop Shop | 2 roles -Doug Bramley -Horrie Gibbs | TV series |
| 1979 | Skyways | Edward Fielding | TV series, 2 episodes |
| 1980 | All the Green Years | Mr. Reeves | TV series |
| 1981–1985 | Prisoner | Wally Wallace | TV series |
| 1986 | Sword of Honour | Stuart Rogers | TV miniseries |
| 1986, 2013 | Neighbours | Jack Lassiter | TV series |
| 1987 | The Petrov Affair | Alan Reid | TV miniseries |
| 1989 | The Flying Doctors | Neil Hutton | TV series |
| 1990 | Flair | Harris | TV miniseries |
| 1991 | A Country Practice | Tom O'Connell | TV series |
| 1992 | Good Vibrations | Cec | TV miniseries |
| 1993 | Phoenix | Bill Douglas | TV series |
| 1994 | Wedlocked | Father Damien | TV series |
| 1994 | Law of the Land | Reg Bates | TV series |
| 1995 | Snowy River: The McGregor Saga | Gil Tyson | TV series |
| 1997 | State Coroner | Keith Summers | TV series |
| 1998 | Good Guys, Bad Guys | Judge Moody | TV series |
| 1998 | Driven Crazy | Mr. Tuck | TV series |
| 1998–00 | The Games | Radio Newreader (voice only), Database Inquiry Questioner | TV series |
| 1999 | Queen Kat, Carmel and St Jude | Lecturer | TV miniseries |
| 2000–04 | Blue Heelers | 3 roles -George Ratcliffe QC -Bob Swinburn -Doc Parkinson | TV series |
| 2001 | Round the Twist | Cornelius Crenshaw | TV series |
| 2001 | Something in the Air | Bill Mackay | TV series |
| 2001 | Halifax f.p. | Joshua Lippmann | TV series |
| 2002 | The Secret Life of Us | Dr. Morgan | TV series |
| 2002–03 | MDA | Dr. Hugo Willard | TV series |
| 2003 | Welcher and Welcher | Judge Furphy | TV series |
| 2003 | Stingers | Detective Senior Sargeant Bill Skelton | TV series |
| 2003 | The Saddle Club | Bud | TV series |
| 2004 | Fergus McPhail | Shop Assistant | TV series |
| 2005 | Holly's Heroes | Max Peterson | TV series |
| 2007 | City Homicide | Harry Mackintosh | TV series |
| 2021 | Talking Prisoner | Himself | YouTube special |

=== As writer ===
| Year | Title | Role | Type |
|---|---|---|---|
| 1963 | And the Big Men Fly | Writer | TV movie |
| 1964 | Barley Charlie | Writer | TV series, season 1 (7 episodes) |
| 1967 | Bellbird | Writer | TV series |
| 1968 | The World of Seekers | Writer | TV movie |
| 1969 | The Cheerful Cuckold | Writer | TV movie (from Australian Plays) |
| 1973 | The Barry Crocker Comedy Hour | Writer | TV special |
| 1973 | Alvin Purple | Screenplay | Feature film |
| 1974 | And the Big Men Fly | Writer | TV series, season 1 (6 episodes) |
| 1974 | Alvin Rides Again | Screenplay | Feature film |
| 1975 | The True Story of Eskimo Nell | Writer | Feature film |
| 1976 | Alvin Purple | Writer / creator | TV series, season 1 (13 episodes) |
| 1979 | Gulpilil: Man of Two Worlds | Writer | TV movie |
| 1979 | The Prophecies of Nostradamus | Writer | Feature film |
| 1980 | The Quick Brown Fox | Writer | Short film |
| 1981 | The Man Who Saw Tomorrow | Screenplay | Feature film |
| 1981 | And Here Comes Bucknuckle | Writer | TV series, season 1 (6 episodes) |
| 1981 | Pacific Banana | Screenplay | Feature film |
| 1981 | The Cliffhanger | Writer | Short TV movie |
| 1981 | The Bush Bunch: 1.1 the Cliffhanger | Writer | TV movie |
| 1982 | Breakfast in Paris | Screenplay (credited as Morris Dalton) | Feature film |
| 1982 | Prisoner | Writer | TV series, season 4 (1 episode) |
| 1983 | A Slice of Life | Screenplay | Feature film |
| 1985 | Fountain of Youth | Writer | TV movie |
| 1985 | From Opera with Love | Writer | TV movie |
| 1988–91 | The Flying Doctors | Writer | TV series, seasons 3-5 & 9 (6 episodes) |
| 1989 | Sugar and Spice | Writer | TV series, season 1 (8 episodes) |
| 1989–91 | Pugwall | Scriptwriter | TV series, seasons 1 & 2 (42 episodes) |
| 1990 | Flair | Writer | TV miniseries (2 episodes) |
| 1991 | Chances | Writer | TV series, season 1 (3 episodes) |
| 1994 | Blue Heelers | Writer | TV series, season 1 (1 episodes) |
| 1998–01 | Neighbours | Writer | TV series, seasons 14–17 (22 episodes) |

== Theatre ==
=== As actor ===
| Year | Title | Role | Type |
|---|---|---|---|
| 1947 | Saint Joan | | Playhouse, Hobart |
| 1953 | Slaves of Duty | | Puckapunyal Army Base |
| 1953 | The Shoemaker's Holiday | Lord Mayor of London | University of Melbourne |
| 1956 | Of Mice and Men | George | University of Melbourne |
| 1956 | The Madwoman of Chaillot | The Rag Picker | University of Melbourne |
| 1956 | Golden Boy | | University of Melbourne |
| 1956 | The Troublemakers | | University of Melbourne |
| 1956 | Thieves' Carnival | Harlequin | University of Melbourne |
| 1957 | Much Ado About Nothing | | University of Melbourne |
| 1957 | Arsenic and Old Lace | Lieutenant Rooney | University of Melbourne |
| 1957 | A View from the Bridge | First Officer / Neighbour | University of Melbourne |
| 1957 | Speak of the Devil | | University of Melbourne |
| 1958 | The Making of Moo | William | University of Melbourne |
| 1958 | A Hatful of Rain | Polo Pope | University of Melbourne |
| 1958 | Lola Montez | Smith | University of Melbourne, Her Majesty's Theatre, Brisbane, Elizabethan Theatre |
| 1958 | The Threepenny Opera | Smith | University of Melbourne |
| 1958 | Look Back in Anger | Cliff Lewis | Elizabethan Theatre |
| 1959 | Marcus | | University of Melbourne with The Marlowe Society |
| 1960 | Long Day's Journey into Night | Edmund Tyrone | St Martins Theatre |
| 1961 | Stop Press | | Phillip Street Theatre |
| 1962 | The Fantasticks | Narrator | Russell Street Theatre |
| 1963 | The Man Who Came to Dinner | Banjo | Russell Street Theatre |
| 1963-65 | And the Big Men Fly | J.J. Forbes | Russell Street Theatre, Arts Theatre Adelaide, Wangaratta Town Hall, Broken Hill Town Hall, Playhouse Perth, Albury, Theatre Royal Hobart, Twelfth Night Theatre |
| 1964 | After the Fall | Quentin | Russell Street Theatre |
| 1964 | Night of the Auk | | University of Melbourne |
| 1965 | Entertaining Mr Sloane | | Russell Street Theatre |
| 1965 | Bandicoot on a Burnt Ridge | | Russell Street Theatre |
| 1965 | Tiny Alice | Butler | University of Melbourne |
| 1965 | Inadmissible Evidence | | University of Melbourne |
| 1965 | The Homecoming | Lenny | University of Melbourne |
| 1966 | A Break in the Music | Derek | Playhouse Theatre Perth |
| 1966 | The Owl and the Pussycat | | Russell Street Theatre |
| 1967 | The Servant of Two Masters | Truffaldino | Russell Street Theatre |
| 1968 | The Crucible | Giles Corey | Russell Street Theatre, Canberra Theatre, Tasmania |
| 1968 | Three Sisters | Captain Solyony | Russell Street Theatre |
| 1968 | Everything in the Garden | | Russell Street Theatre |
| 1969 | Henry IV, Part 1 | Poins | Octagon Theatre Perth, Murdoch Court Melbourne |
| 1986 | A Kind of Justice | | Masonic Hall, Perth |
| 1993-94 | Emperor of the Ghetto | Rumkowski | Fairfax Studio Melbourne, Lion Theatre Adelaide with Bay Street Productions |
| 1995 | It's My Party (And I'll Die if I Want To) | | Arts Theatre Adelaide |
| 1997 | For Better, for Worse | Des | Chapel Off Chapel with Bay Street Productions |
| 2007 | Four Funerals in One Day | Clarrie | Bay Street Productions |
| 2007-08 | Visiting Mr. Green | Mr Green | Whitehorse Centre, Drum Theatre Dandenong, Kingston Arts Centre Moorabbin, Clocktower Centre Moonee Ponds |
| 2008 | The Peppercorn Tree | Jonah | |
| 2008 | Never Too Old | Fred | Monash University, Chapel Off Chapel with Bay Street Productions |
| 2012 | Hear Me | Doctor | International Incident Disclosure Conference with Bay Street Productions |
| 2017 | Never Too Old | Fred | at ACMI, Federation Square for Melbourne International Comedy Festival with Bay Street Productions |
| 2019 | Never Too Old | Fred | Glen Eira Town Hall for Glen Eira Storytelling Festival with Bay Street Productions |
| 2020 | The Carer | George Parker | Online with The Sugden Society with Bay Street Productions |

=== As writer / director / crew ===
| Year | Title | Role | Type |
|---|---|---|---|
| 1957 | Beauty and the Beast | Stage manager | University of Melbourne |
| 1959 | Marcus | Playwright | University of Melbourne |
| 1961 | Stop Press | Lyricist | Phillip Street Theatre |
| 1963-65 | And the Big Men Fly | Playwright | Russell Street Theatre, Arts Theatre Adelaide, Wangaratta Town Hall, Broken Hill Town Hall, Playhouse Perth, Albury, Theatre Royal Hobart, Twelfth Night Theatre |
| 1964 | The Golden Legion of Cleaning Women | Playwright | Russell Street Theatre |
| 1965-66 | The Golden Legion of Cleaning Women | Playwright | Burnley Theatre Richmond, Camberwell |
| 1966 | Private Yuk Objects | Playwright | Mildura, Russell Street Theatre, Phillip Theatre, Mildura Arts Centre |
| 1967 | Terribly Terribly | | University of California |
| 1967 | Monkey Tricks | Playwright | Playhouse Canberra |
| 1967 | And the Big Men Fly | Playwright | Playhouse Canberra |
| 1967-68 | The Golden Legion of Cleaning Women | Playwright | Pymble Community Hall, Adelaide Teachers College, Twelfth Night Theatre |
| 1970 | And the Big Men Fly | Playwright | Scott Theatre, Adelaide |
| 1973 | And the Big Men Fly | Playwright | La Boite Theatre |
| 1974 | Terribly Terribly | Playwright | Monash University |
| 1976 | And the Big Men Fly | Playwright | SGIO Theatre |
| 1977 | The Golden Legion of Cleaning Women | Playwright | Mountview Theatre Macedon, Arts Theatre Brisbane |
| 1980-83 | And the Big Men Fly | Playwright | Victorian country tour, Arts Theatre Brisbane, Arts Theatre Adelaide, Tilley Recreation Park Adelaide, Brown's Mart Theatre Darwin with Bay Street Productions |
| 1982 | The Golden Legion of Cleaning Women | Playwright | Nerang, Newcastle |
| 1986 | The Golden Legion of Cleaning Women; Out of the Frying Pan; A Kind of Justice | Playwright | Masonic Hall Perth |
| 1988 | And the Big Men Fly | Playwright | Russell Street Theatre with Bay Street Productions |
| 1970 | Ritual | Playwright | Majestic Cinemas Sydney |
| 1992 | Petrov: The Musical | PlaywrIght | Melbourne Concert Hall |
| 1993-94 | Emperor of The Ghetto | Adaptor | Fairfax Studio Melbourne, Lion Theatre Adelaide with Bay Street Productions |
| 1994 | And the Big Men Fly | Playwright | Theatre 62, Adelaide with Bay Street Productions |
| 1997 | For Better for Worse | Playwright | Chapel Off Chapel with Bay Street Productions |
| 1998 | The Golden Legion of Cleaning Women | Playwright | Harbour Theatre, Shellharbour |
| 2001 | The Golden Legion of Cleaning Women | Playwright | Tweed Heads Civic and Cultural Centre |
| 2002 | And the Big Men Fly | Playwright | Tower Arts Centre, Adelaide with Bay Street Productions |
| 1999-2004 | The Carer | Playwright | Australian national tour with Bay Street Productions |
| 2005 | Six Degrees of Diabetes | Playwright | Bay Street Productions |
| 2005 | Red Dust Diva - the Musical | Writer | Chapel Off Chapel |
| 2006 | A Pill, a Pump and a Needle | Playwright | Bay Street Productions |
| 2005-07 | Weary - the Story of Sir Edward Dunlop | Playwright | Australian national tour |
| 2007 | Four Funerals in One Day | Playwright | Bay Street Productions |
| 2008 | Never Too Old | Director / Playwright | Monash University, Chapel Off Chapel with Bay Street Productions |
| 2008 | Wicked Widows | Director / Playwright | Monash University, Chapel Off Chapel |
| 2009 | My Dog Has Stripes | Playwright | Fortyfivedownstairs with Bay Street Productions |
| 2011 | The Empty Chair | Playwright | Bay Street Productions |
| 2012 | Hear Me | Playwright | Bay Street Productions |
| 2014 | Do You Know Me | Playwright | Bay Street Productions |
