= Robert Pomie Ballet =

Robert Pomie Ballet was a series of ballets broadcast by the ABC in 1963 choreographed by Robert Pomie and directed by Christopher Muir.

They included:

- The Web
- Le Bal del Tutus
- The Fir Tree
