= Night Stop =

1963 television film directed by Patrick Barton

- Advertisement The Age 20 March 1963
- Written by: Norman King
- Directed by: Patrick Barton
- Country of origin: Australia
- Original language: English

Production
- Running time: 60 mins
- Production company: ABC

Original release
- Network: ABC
- Release: 20 March 1963 (Melbourne)
- Release: 12 June 1963 (Sydney)

Night Stop is a 1963 Australian television play. It was filmed in Melbourne and had been performed on British TV.

== Plot ==
In a Midlands market town on the River Trent, a young bargeman, Eddy, is determined to learn the truth about the death of his friend, Frank. He believes the truth can be found in the Midlands market town on the River Trent.

== Cast ==
- George Whaley as Eddy
- Judith Arthy as Julie
- Betty Berrell
- Helen Douglas
- Alan Hopgood as Gary
- Roma Johnstone
- Reg Livermore as Ray
- Leslie Wright as army corporal

== Production ==
It was the second Australian TV production from Patrick Barton. Many of the cast were relative newcomers to Australian screens.

It was advertised as "live modern suspense drama".

== Reception ==
The TV critic from the Sydney Morning Herald thought the script was "pointless sensation seeking... more than ordinarily tiresome. Why this weary reshuffling of mildewed dramatic effects in an English setting should have been called worth reproducing in it Melbourne studio is difficult to understand."
