= Dorothy Blewett =

Australian playwright and novelist

Dorothy Blewett (1898–1965) was an Australian writer and literary agent. She also wrote as Anne Praize or Ann Praize. Several of her plays were adapted for TV. She lived for a time in England.

== Life ==
Dorothy Emilie Blewett was born at Northcote in Victoria on 23 July 1898. Her father was John Blewett, who worked with the Victorian Railways for almost 50 years. She was a student at the Methodist Ladies' College, Melbourne where she was editor of the school magazine in her final year.

Blewett's earliest published works were written under the pseudonym, Anne Praize. They included short stories published by Table Talk and the novel, Vision, described as "besides being a vividly written romance, it breathes the open air freedom and spaciousness of a great country."

Two of her plays were filmed by the ABC.

Her writings have recently received critical re-appraisal.

Blewett died in Melbourne on 17 September 1965.

== Selected works ==
=== Plays ===
- The First Joanna
- Quiet Night (1941)
- It Has Happened Before (1943)
- I Have Taken a Prisoner

=== Novels ===
- Vision (1931)
- Pattern for a Scandal (1948)

=== Short stories ===
- "A Voice on the Telephone" (1931)
- "Alured the Assured" (1931)
- "April and October" (1931)
- "This Girl Came to Our School" (1949)

== Awards ==
- Westralian Drama Festival Award, 1941, for Quiet Night
- Playwrights' Advisory Board Competition, 1947, for The First Joanna
