= The Bartered Bride (1960 film) =

- Country of origin: Australia
- Original language: English

Production
- Producer: Christopher Muir
- Running time: 120 mins
- Production company: Australian Broadcasting Commission

Original release
- Release: 27 July 1960 (Melbourne, live)

The Bartered Bride is a 1960 TV play broadcast by the Australian Broadcasting Corporation. It was an opera directed by Christopher Muir.
