= George Whaley (actor) =

Australian actor, director, and writer (1934–2019)

- Born: 19 June 1934; Castlemaine, Victoria, Australia
- Died: 6 August 2019 (aged 85); Northern Rivers, New South Wales, Australia
- Occupations: Actor; director; playwright; teacher
- Spouse: Georgina Whaley (m. 1966)
- Children: 2

George Whaley (19 June 1934 – 6 August 2019) was an Australian actor, director and writer, known for his work across theatre and film.

== Early life ==
Whaley was born in Castlemaine, Victoria, Australia on 19 June 1934. He initially trained as an engineer, before studying acting with Eileen O’Keefe, who introduced him to the teachings of Stanislavski.

== Career ==
=== Acting ===
Whaley's first professional acting role was in John Osborne's Look Back in Anger in 1960. He went on to perform at Melbourne's Emerald Hill Theatre (which he opened with Wal Cherry in 1962). He performed (and directed) at all the major theatre companies including Melbourne Theatre Company, Nimrod Theatre Company, the Old Tote Theatre, the Griffin Theatre Company and the Belvoir Street Theatre. He notably played Galileo Galilei on stage in the 1980s and 1990s. In May 1972, he appeared in an episode of the anthology series A Time for Love in the lead role of Arion Temple, alongside Gregory de Polnay and Olivia Hamnett.

He appeared in films such as Stork (1971), Alvin Purple (1973), Bliss (1985), The Crossing (1990), Turtle Beach (1992) and Daydream Believer (1992).

He also had guest roles in many television series including Consider Your Verdict, Homicide, Division 4, The Flying Doctors, Bodyline, A Country Practice, Mother and Son, All Saints. His last screen credit was an episode of miniseries The Gods of Wheat Street in 2014.

=== Directing ===
Whaley directed many plays, including Brecht's Mother Courage and Her Children, John Derum's adaptation of C. J. Dennis's More than a Sentimental Bloke, David Williamson's The Perfectionist and Harold Pinter's Old Times.

He co-founded Theatre ACT (Canberra), was founding Director of University Theatre at University of Melbourne, and Resident Director at Sydney's Old Tote Theatre.

He was also a noted TV director. He wrote and directed the miniseries The Harp in the South and its sequel Poor Man's Orange, as well as the film Dad and Dave: On Our Selection. He directed the film Dancing, produced by David Elfick, which was shown at the Melbourne International Film Festival in 1980. He also directed children's programs such as More Winners and Clowning Around.

Whaley worked extensively with Indigenous actors, including David Gulpilil, Jack Charles, Ivan Sen, Warwick Thornton and Erica Glynn.

Whaley was responsible for discovering actor Geoffrey Rush, casting him in his first stage role, Waiting for Godot in 1979, and in his first film role, Dad and Dave: On Our Selection in 1995.

He also worked as writer, adaptor, producer, fight director, set designer and designer.

=== Teaching ===
Whaley taught as Head of Acting at National Institute of Dramatic Art (NIDA) from 1976 to 1981, where among other students, he taught Mel Gibson, Judy Davis, Colin Friels, Hugo Weaving, Philip Quast, Steve Bisley, Tom Burlinson, Linda Cropper, Penny Cook, Anne Tenney, Heather Mitchell and Di Smith.

He joined Australian Film Television and Radio School (AFTRS) in Sydney as a directing consultant in the mid-1990s, later becoming Head of Directing - a role he held until 2002.

In his later years, Whaley moved to Dorroughby, in the Northern Rivers, where he taught Acting for Stage and Screen at Lismore Conservatorium. He employed Stanislavski's Method in his teachings.

=== Publications ===
Whaley penned a 2009 biography about British actor Leo McKern - Leo McKern: the Accidental Actor.

== Personal life ==
Whaley met his wife-to-be Georgina in 1960. They married in 1966, and had two sons, Michael and Matthew, and five grandchildren.

== Death ==
In his final years, Whaley struggled with Parkinsons disease, and relocated to Feros Village in Bangalow, to receive medical care. He died in the Northern Rivers of New South Wales, on 6 August 2019, aged 85.

== Acting ==
=== Film ===
| Year | Title | Role | Type |
|---|---|---|---|
| 1969 | To Australia with Love | | Short film |
| 1971 | Stork | Businessman | Feature film |
| 1971 | The Hot Centre of the World | | Short film |
| 1973 | Alvin Purple | Dr. McBurney | Feature film |
| 1985 | Bliss | Vance | Feature film |
| 1990 | The Crossing | Sid | Feature film |
| 1992 | Turtle Beach (aka The Killing Beach) | Bill | Feature film |
| 1992 | Daydream Believer (aka The Girl Who Came Late) | Mike | Feature film |
| 1997 | Retro Sheilas in Space Aliens Are Tooling Our Sheilas | Prime Minister Keating | Short film |
| 1997 | The Tower | The Minister | TV movie |
| 2001 | Rubberman Accepts the Nobel Prize | Announcer | Short film |
| 2002 | Mimi | Auctioneer | Short film |

=== Television ===
| Year | Title | Role | Type |
|---|---|---|---|
| 1961 | The Rivals | Faulkland | TV play |
| 1963 | Night Stop | Eddy | TV play |
| 1963 | A Piece of Ribbon | | TV play |
| 1964 | On Approval | The Duke of Bristol | TV play |
| 1964 | Barley Charlie | | TV series, 1 episode |
| 1962-64 | Consider Your Verdict | Don Fraser / Stanley Naughton | TV series, 3 episodes |
| 1964 | Corruption in the Palace of Justice | | TV play |
| 1964 | Luther | | TV play |
| 1965 | A Time to Speak | John | TV play |
| 1965 | Duet: The Face at the Club House Door and How Do You Spell Matrimony? | | TV play |
| 1965 | A Christmas Play | | TV play |
| 1965 | The Winds of Green Monday | Welshman Jones | TV play |
| 1966 | Jimmy | Self | TV series, 4 episodes |
| 1966 | Homicide | Charles Steiner | TV series, 1 episode |
| 1966-67 | Australian Playhouse | Fenwick / Ralph Ellis | TV series, 3 episodes |
| 1967 | Die Flederemaus | | TV play |
| 1967 | Hey You! | Simpkins | TV series, 2 episodes |
| 1967 | The Heat's On | | TV play |
| 1967 | Breakdown | | TV play |
| 1972 | A Time for Love | Arion Temple | Episode: "Temple in Ruins" |
| 1976 | Matlock Police | Emmanuel Bridger | TV series, 1 episode |
| 1981 | Bellamy | Lampani | TV miniseries, 1 episode |
| | Division 4 | | TV series |
| 1988 | Australians | | TV miniseries, 1 episode |
| 1988 | The Fremantle Conspiracy | | TV miniseries |
| 1989 | Rafferty's Rules | Patrick I'Connor | TV series, 1 episode |
| 1990 | The Flying Doctors | Mingo McTaggart | TV series, 1 episode |
| 1984 | Bodyline | Lord Hawke | TV miniseries |
| 1991 | Ring of Scorpio | Julio | TV miniseries, 4 episodes |
| 1992 | A Country Practice | Gil Tyler | TV series, 2 episodes |
| 1992 | Bligh | Thomas Bowlder | TV series, 1 episode |
| 1993 | G.P. | G.J. Harrison | TV series, 2 episodes |
| 1993 | Stark | Australian politician | TV miniseries |
| 1994 | Mother and Son | Doctor | TV series, 1 episode |
| 2008 | All Saints | Bill Blight | TV series |
| 2009 | Dirt Game | Tim Royce | TV miniseries |
| 2014 | The Gods of Wheat Street | Magistrate | TV miniseries, 2 episodes |

=== Stage ===
| Year | Title | Role | Venue / Theatre Company |
|---|---|---|---|
| 1960 | Look Back in Anger | | |
| 1968 | The Crucible | John Proctor | |
| 1981 | Accidental Death of an Anarchist | | Nimrod Theatre Company |
| 1983 | Party Wall | | Nimrod Theatre Company |

=== Radio ===
| Year | Title | Role | Type |
|---|---|---|---|
| 1969 | Burke's Company | | Radio play |

== Directing ==
=== Film ===
| Year | Title | Role | Type |
|---|---|---|---|
| 1980 | Dancing | Director | Film |
| 1995 | Dad and Dave: On Our Selection | Writer / director | Feature film |

=== Television ===
| Year | Title | Role | Type |
|---|---|---|---|
| 1987 | The Harp in the South | Writer / director | TV miniseries, 3 episodes |
| 1987 | Poor Man's Orange | Writer / director | TV miniseries, 2 episodes |
| 1988 | Australians | Director | TV series, episode 8: "Jack Davey" |
| 1990 | More Winners | Director | TV series, episode 3: "Mr Edmund" |
| 1991 | Clowning Around | Director | TV miniseries |
| 1993 | Clowning Around 2 | Director | TV miniseries |
| 1999 | The Adventures of Sam | Director | Animated TV series |

=== Stage ===
| Year | Title | Venue / Theatre Company |
|---|---|---|
| 1976 | Trespassers Will Be Prosecuted | Jane Street Theatre with National Institute of Dramatic Art |
| 1977 | The Hostage | National Institute of Dramatic Art |
| 1978 | The Threepenny Opera | National Institute of Dramatic Art |
| 1979 | On Our Selection | Jane Street Theatre & Nimrod Theatre with National Institute of Dramatic Art |
| 1979 | Waiting for Godot | Jane Street Theatre with National Institute of Dramatic Art |
| 1980 | The Women Pirates | National Institute of Dramatic Art |
| | Mother Courage and Her Children | |
| | More than a Sentimental Bloke | |
| | The Perfectionist | |
| | Old Times | |

== Awards and nominations ==
| Year | Nominated work | Award | Result |
|---|---|---|---|
| 1968 | The Crucible | Best Actor | Won |
| 1987 | The Harp in the South | AFI Award for Best Direction in a Miniseries | Nominated |
| 1988 | Poor Man's Orange | AFI Award for Best Achievement in Direction in a Miniseries | Nominated |
| 1993 | More Winners: Mr Edmund | CableACE Award for Excellence International Children's Programming Special or Series | Nominated |
| 1995 | Dad and Dave: On Our Seiection | AFI Award for Best Adapted Screenplay | Nominated |

== External sources ==
- George Whaley at IMDb
