= Christopher Muir =

Australian TV director and producer (1931–2022)

- Born: 1931; Melbourne Victoria, Australia
- Died: 2022 (aged 90–91)
- Occupations: Television executive, film and television producer and director
- Known for: Head of the ABC drama department

Christopher Muir (1931–2022) was an Australian director and producer, notable for his work in TV in the 1950s and 1960s. In the 1980s he was head of ABC Television drama.

== Biography ==
Most of his early childhood was spent in France, but he returned to Melbourne on the outbreak of World War II. He joined the ABC in 1949 at the recommendation of his headmaster upon completing his schooling at Melbourne Grammar School. Initially working as a messenger boy, he soon became a general trainee, and by 1954 he was a radio announcer. In 1955 the ABC seconded him to Paris to study television. He returned to Melbourne for the inauguration of ABC television in 1956. The ensuing decade saw him become a pioneer of television drama and music productions, often screened live-to-air during prime time on the ABC.

In an interview about the ABC's live TV drama he said "We producers had a buzz around us wherever we went but we also faced a lot of criticism. I thought 60 percent of what we did was okay and 40 percent I thought was dreadful. I recall doing several one-act plays by Australians but nothing memorable. There was no firm commitment to local material and we felt it was fascinating for viewers to see things like Chekhov and some of the world's best drama."

Annette Andre said "he was very intelligent and more experienced. He wasn’t easy, but he could get a performance out of an actor."

He left in the early 70s to work in theatre, but soon returned. In 1982 he was appointed head of drama at the ABC. Uncomfortable with the politics of the role and changes taking place within the organisation, Muir left the ABC in 1987 after 38 years there.

== Personal life ==
He was married to German-Australian actress and theatre director Elke Neidhardt, with whom he had a son, Fabian.

== Select credits ==
- Seeing Stars (1957) (variety)
- Killer in Close-Up (1957) (TV play) – producer
- The Duke in Darkness (1957) (TV play) – producer
- Amahl and the Night Visitors (1957) (TV opera film of the opera by Menotti) – producer
- Last Call (1958) (TV film) – producer
- Outpost (1959) (TV play) – director
- Black Chiffon (1959) (TV play) – producer
- Antony and Cleopatra (1959) (TV film) – director
- Till Death Do Us Part (1959) (TV film) – producer
- Dinner with the Family (1959) (TV play) – producer
- Albert Herring (1959) (TV opera film of the opera by Britten) – producer
- The Astronauts (1960) (TV film) – producer
- Uncle Martino (1960) (TV play) – producer
- Eye of the Night (1960) (TV play) – director
- The Bartered Bride (1960) (TV opera film of the opera by Smetana) – director
- Waters of the Moon (1961) (TV play) – director
- The Bloodless Sand (1961) (TV ballet) – director
- The First Joanna (1961) (TV adaptation of the play by Dorothy Blewett) – producer
- Sylvia (1961) (TV ballet) – producer
- The Rivals (1961) (TV play) – director
- Quiet Night (1961) (TV adaptation of the play by Dorothy Blewett) – producer
- Marriage Lines (1962) (TV film) – director, producer
- Martine (1961) (TV play) – producer
- Boy Round the Corner (1962) (TV play) – producer
- Fury in Petticoats (1962) (TV play) – producer
- The Ambitious Servant Girl (1962) (TV opera film of La serva padrona by Pergolesi) – producer
- The Prodigal Son (1962) (TV opera film of Debussy's L'enfant prodigue) – producer
- The Teeth of the Wind (1962) (TV play) – producer
- She'll Be Right (1962) (TV play) – producer
- One in Five (1963) (TV ballet) – producer
- Man of Destiny (1963) (TV play) – producer
- A Piece of Ribbon (1963) (TV play) – producer
- The White Carnation (1963) (TV play) – producer
- Bastien and Bastienne (1963) (TV opera film of the opera by Mozart) – producer
- Robert Pomie Ballet (1963) (TV series of three ballets) – producer
- Simone Boccanegra (1963) (Opera film of the opera by Verdi) – director
- The Physicists (1964) (TV adaptation of the play by Dürrenmatt) – director, producer
- Six Characters in Search of an Author (1964) (TV play) – director, producer
- Luther (1964) (TV play) – director, producer
- Nude with Violin (1964) (TV play) – producer
- Peter Grimes (1964) (TV opera film of the opera by Britten) – producer
- The Bloodless Sand (1964) (TV play) – producer
- Everyman (1964) (TV adaptation of the 15th-century play) – producer
- The Tower (1965) (TV play) – director, producer
- She (1967) (TV ballet) – director
- Boy with Banner (1966)
- Libido (1973) – executive producer
- Lucky Colour Blue (1975) (TV series) – producer
- Andra (1976) (TV series) – producer
- Golden Pennies (1985) (TV mini series) – executive producer
- Great Expectations the Untold Story (1988) – executive producer
