= Wednesday Theatre =

Australian television series

- Country of origin: Australia
- Original language: English

Original release
- Network: ABC

Wednesday Theatre is a 1960s Australian anthology show which aired on the ABC.

Many of the episodes were imported from the BBC. However a number of episodes were made locally.

== Episodes ==
=== 1965 ===
No. overall	No. in season	Title	Directed by	Written by	Original release date	Original episode
1	1	"The Recruiting Officer"	Ken Hannam with John Meillon	Unknown	6 January 1965	Yes
2	2	"Peter Grimes"	Christopher Muir	Unknown	13 January 1965	Yes
3	3	"Romanoff and Juliet"	Patrick Barton	Noel Robinson	20 January 1965	Yes
4	4	"The Bomb"	Peter Collinson	Unknown	27 January 1965	No
A British show. A young boy is dominated by a bully. With Mark Callan, Rita Murrow.
5	5	"Othello"	Patrick Barton	Raymond Westwell, David Bradley	3 February 1965	Yes
6	6	"Ring Out Wild Bells"	Robert Cubbage and Wilf Buckner	Unknown	10 February 1965	Yes
7	7	"Stalingrad"	Unknown	Unknown	17 February 1965	No
A British TV production starring Albert Lieven and Peter Vaughan.
8	8	"Carmen"	Unknown	Unknown	24 February 1965	No
A BBC filmed opera.
9	9	"The Importance of Being Oscar: Part 1"	Unknown	Micheál MacLiammóir	3 March 1965	No
Starring Micheál MacLiammóir.
10	10	"The Importance of Being Oscar: Part 2"	Unknown	Micheál MacLiammóir	10 March 1965	No
Starring Micheál MacLiammóir.
11	11	"The Fate of Man"	Unknown	Unknown	17 March 1965	No
A 1959 Russian film.
12	12	"A Season in Hell"	Henri Safran	Patricia Hooker	24 March 1965	Yes
13	13	"The Swagman"	Henri Safran	Ian Stuart Black	31 March 1965	Yes
14	14	"A Time to Speak"	Patrick Barton	Noel Robinson	7 April 1965	Yes
15	15	"Time and the Conways"	Unknown	Unknown	14 April 1965	No
A British adaptation of play by J. B. Priestley.
16	16	"The Big Killing"	James Upshaw	Noel Robinson	21 April 1965	Yes
17	17	"The Tower"	Christopher Muir	Noel Robinson	28 April 1965	Yes
18	18	"Daphne Laureola"	Patrick Barton	John Warwick	5 May 1965	Yes
19	19	"Cinderella"	Unknown	Unknown	12 May 1965	Yes
A Sydney opera.
20	20	"Moby Dick Rehearsed"	Ken Hannam	Unknown	19 May 1965	Yes
21	21	Replaced	TBA	TBA	TBA	TBA
Replaced with The National Young Farmers' TV Final 1965 at 8pm, followed by a half-hour production of The Bass Fiddle.
22	22	"Otherwise Engaged"	Oscar Whitbread	John Cameron	2 June 1965	Yes
23	23	"Dangerous Corner"	Patrick Barton	John Warwick	9 June 1965	Yes
24	24	"Louise"	Unknown	Unknown	16 June 1965	Yes
An opera by Charpentier with Mary O'Brien and Robert Guard, produced by Peter Page, SSO.
25	25	"Rusty Bugles"	Alan Burke	John Warwick	23 June 1965	Yes
26	26	"School for Fathers"	Oscar Whitbread	Unknown	30 June 1965	Yes
An opera by Ferrar filmed in Melbourne.
27	27	"The Dogs of Durga Das"	Unknown	Unknown	7 July 1965	No
A BBC production.
28	28	"Duet: The Face at the Club House Door"	Oscar Whitbread	Colin Free	14 July 1965	Yes
28	28	"How Do You Spell Matrimony?"	Oscar Whitbread	Colin Free	14 July 1965	Yes
29	29	"Waiting in the Wings"	Patrick Barton	John Warwick	21 July 1965	Yes
30	30	"The Sweet Sad Story of Elmo and Me"	Henri Safran	Ric Throssell	27 July 1965	Yes
31	31	"The Winds of Green Monday"	Oscar Whitbread	Michael Noonan	4 August 1965	Yes
32	32	"Ever Since Paradise"	Unknown	Unknown	11 August 1965	No
A British TV show, from play by J. B. Priestley.
33	33	"The Affair"	Eric Taylor	Ronald Miller	18 August 1965	Yes
34	34	"Winter in Ischia"	Peter Cotes	Unknown	25 August 1965	No
A BBC production. By Robin Maugham with Eva Bartok.
35	35	"The Picardy Affair"	Unknown	Unknown	8 September 1965	No
A British TV production with Robin Hardy about Henry V.
36	36	"The Door"	Unknown	Unknown	15 September 1965	No
By Joan Morgan with Ann Todd.
37	37	"Macbeth"	Alan Burke	Unknown	22 September 1965	Yes
38	38	"Dark Corridor"	Alan Burke	Trevor Nielsen	6 October 1965	Yes
39	39	"Tartuffe"	Henri Safran	John Warwick and Henri Safran	13 October 1965	Yes
40	40	"Collect Your Hand Luggage"	Unknown	Unknown	20 October 1965	No
A British TV production by John Mortimer starring Kenneth More.
41	41	"Cross of Gold"	Patrick Barton	Richard Lane	27 October 1965	Yes
42	42	"The Bergonzi Hand"	Unknown	Unknown	3 November 1965	No
A British BBC TV production by Tyrone Guthrie with Keith Michell (playing an Australian) and Gordon Jackson.
43	43	"Photo Finish"	Oscar Whitbread	John Warwick	3 November 1965	Yes
44	44	"The Casualties"	Unknown	Unknown	17 November 1965	No
Previously aired in the United Kingdom.
45	45	"Campaign for One"	Brian Faull	Anthony Church and Marielaine Double	24 November 1965	Yes
46	46	"The Cruel Deadline"	Unknown	Unknown	1 December 1965	No
A British TV production with Guy Doleman.
47	47	"Write Me a Murder"	Henri Safran	Kenneth Hayles	8 December 1965	No
48	48	"The Search"	Unknown	Unknown	15 December 1965	No
A British TV production.
49	49	"A Christmas Play"	Brian Faull	Carl Orff	22 December 1965	Yes

=== 1966 ===
No. overall	No. in season	Title	Directed by	Written by	Original release date	Original episode
50	1	"Plain Jane"	Oscar Whitbread	Stewart Love	5 January 1966	Yes
Australian play.
51	2	"Brimstone Butterfly"	Unknown	Unknown	12 January 1966	TBA
A British TV show starring John Le Mesurier.
52	3	"The Image"	Unknown	Unknown	19 January 1966	TBA
A British TV play by Kenneth Hill.
53	4	"Valentina"	Unknown	Unknown	26 January 1966	TBA
Previously aired in the United Kingdom.
54	5	"Uncle Selwyn"	Unknown	Unknown	2 February 1966	TBA
Previously aired in the United Kingdom.
55	6	"Finger on the Balance"	Unknown	Unknown	9 February 1966	TBA
A British play by Patrick Simpson.
56	7	"No Trams to Lime Street"	Unknown	Unknown	16 February 1966	TBA
A British production by Alun Owen.
57	8	"Acquit or Hang?"	Unknown	Unknown	23 February 1966	TBA
A British TV play, story of the Mutiny on the Bounty. John Hurt starred.
58	9	"The Gypsy Baron"	Unknown	Unknown	2 March 1966	Yes
Operetta by Johann Strauss. Sydney production.
59	10	"Return to the Regiment"	Unknown	Unknown	9 March 1966	TBA
Previously aired in the United Kingdom. With Michael Redgrave.
60	11	"Mr Douglas"	Unknown	Unknown	16 March 1966	TBA
Previously aired in the United Kingdom. About Bonnie Prince Charlie.
61	12	"Justin Thyme"	Unknown	Unknown	23 March 1966	TBA
Previously aired in the United Kingdom. Spoof of James Bond films starring John Bluthal.
62	13	"My One True Love"	Unknown	Unknown	30 March 1966	TBA
By Hugh Leonard.
63	14	"Topaze"	Christopher Muir	John Warwick	30 March 1966 Sydney and 6 April 1966 Melbourne	TBA
By Marcel Pagnol.
64	15	"The Lover"	Unknown	Unknown	6 April 1966 Melbourne and 13 April 1966 Sydney	TBA
By Harold Pinter with Alan Badel. Previously aired in the UK.
65	16	"Sword of Vengeance"	Unknown	Unknown	13 April 1966 Melbourne and Sydney 20 April 1966	TBA
Previously aired in the United Kingdom. With Donald Houston.
66	17	"The Sound of Murder"	Unknown	Unknown	27 April 1966	TBA
Previously aired in the United Kingdom. By William Fairchild with Marius Goring.
67	18	"Ashes to Ashes"	Patrick Barton	Marc Brendel	27 April 1966 Melbourne and Sydney 4 May 1966	Yes
Australian script directed by Patrick Barton.
68	19	"Tosca"	TBA	TBA	TBA	Yes
Tosca* Sydney production - produced by Robert Allnut starring Diana Perryman (aired Melbourne 4 May 1966); Culloden BBC production (aired Melbourne 11 May 1966) - in Sydney production that night *Amelia Goes to the Ball* (Sydney production aired 11 May 1966 and Melbourne 25 May 1966)
69	20	"Undercurrent"	Unknown	Unknown	18 May 1966 Sydney and Melbourne	TBA
Previously aired in the United Kingdom.
70	21	"The Scapegoat"	Unknown	Unknown	18 May 1966 Melbourne and Sydney 25 May 1966	TBA
Previously aired in the United Kingdom. Starring Kenneth More.
71	22	"La Belle Helene"	Unknown	Unknown	1 June 1966	TBA
Previously aired in the United Kingdom. Operetta.
72	23	"Benbow Was His Name"	Unknown	Unknown	8 June 1966	TBA
Previously aired in the United Kingdom. Starring Donald Wolfit.
73	24	"Vicky and the Sultan"	Unknown	Unknown	15 June 1966	TBA
Previously aired in the United Kingdom.
74	25	"Point of Departure"	Henri Safran	Jean Anouilh	22 June 1966	Yes
Australian adaptation of play by Jean Anouilh directed by Henri Safran. (Melbourne had The Interior Decorator.
75	26	"Captain Carvallo"	Unknown	Unknown	29 June 1966	TBA
A British production by Denis Gannon.
76	27	"The Master of Santiago"	Unknown	Unknown	6 July 1966	TBA
Previously aired in the United Kingdom.
77	28	"A Phoenix Too Frequent"	Oscar Whitbread	Unknown	13 July 1966	TBA
Previously aired in the United Kingdom. By Christopher Fry.
78	29	"The July Plot"	Unknown	Unknown	20 July 1966	TBA
By Roger Manwell.
79	30	"The Unbearable Bassington"	Unknown	Unknown	27 July 1966	TBA
Previously aired in the United Kingdom.
80	31	"Antigone"	Patrick Barton	Unknown	3 August 1966	Yes
Australian adaptation of play by Sophocles with Raymond Westwell and Liza Goddard. Filmed in Melbourne
81	32	"Mr Byculla"	Unknown	Unknown	10 August 1966	TBA
Previously aired in the United Kingdom.
82	33	"Eden End"	Unknown	Unknown	17 August 1966	TBA
Previously aired in the United Kingdom. J. B. Priestley.
83	34	"The Third Witness"	Patrick Barton	Ron Callander	24 August 1966	Yes
Australian production, by Ron Callander.
84	35	"Almost a Honeymoon"	Unknown	Unknown	31 August 1966	TBA
Previously aired in the United Kingdom.
85	36	"The Stag"	Unknown	Unknown	7 September 1966	TBA
Previously aired in the United Kingdom.
86	37	"The Interior Decorator"	Unknown	Unknown	14 September 1966	TBA
Previously aired in the United Kingdom.
87	38	"A Crack in the Ice"	Unknown	Unknown	21 September 1966	TBA
By Ronald Eyre.
88	39	"Hamlet"	Unknown	Unknown	28 September 1966	TBA
British production, starring Laurence Olivier.
89	40	"Flight into Danger"	Patrick Barton	Arthur Hailey	5 October 1966	TBA
By Arthur Hailey.
90	41	"Twelfth Night"	Ken Hannam	Unknown	12 October 1966	TBA
Australian adaptation of play by William Shakespeare. Starring Helen Morse, Judith Fisher, Roger Climpson, and Mark McManus
91	42	"The Runaway"	Storry Walton	John Croyston	17 October 1966	Yes
Australian play by John Croyston
92	43	"The House"	Unknown	Unknown	24 October 1966	TBA
Starring Denholm Elliott.
93	44	"The Man Who Saw It"	Unknown	Unknown	2 November 1966	TBA
94	45	"The Good Shoemaker and the Poor Fish Peddler"	Unknown	Unknown	9 November 1966	TBA
95	46	"Justin Thyme"	Unknown	Unknown	16 November 1966	TBA
[replay]
96	47	Episode not traced	TBA	TBA	TBA	TBA
97	48	"The Long House"	Unknown	Unknown	30 November 1966	TBA
98	49	Episode not traced	TBA	TBA	TBA	TBA
99	50	"Iolanthe"	Unknown	Unknown	14 December 1966	TBA
By Gilbert and Sullivan A Sadler Wells production.
100	51	"Cinderella"	Unknown	Unknown	21 December 1966	TBA
101	52	"Hansel and Gretel"	Peter Page	Unknown	28 December 1966	TBA
An opera by Engelbert Humperdinck. Australian production.

=== 1967 ===
No. overall	No. in season	Title	Directed by	Written by	Original release date	Original episode
102	1	"Orpheus in the Underworld"	Unknown	Unknown	4 January 1967	TBA
103	2	"Simon and Laura"	Unknown	Unknown	11 January 1967	TBA
Previously aired in the United Kingdom. with Ian Carmichael.
104	3	"The Cocktail Party"	Unknown	Unknown	18 January 1967	TBA
By T.S. Eliot
105	4	"Waiting for Godot"	Unknown	Unknown	25 January 1967	TBA
Previously aired in the United Kingdom.
106	5	"All Things Bright and Beautiful"	Unknown	Unknown	1 February 1967	TBA
Previously aired in the United Kingdom.
107	6	"Deep and Crisp and Stolen"	Unknown	Unknown	8 February 1967	TBA
Previously aired in the United Kingdom.
108	7	"Celebration: The Wedding and the Funeral"	Unknown	Unknown	15 February 1967	TBA
Previously aired in the United Kingdom.
109	8	"Lady of the Camellias"	Unknown	Unknown	22 February 1967	TBA
Previously aired in the United Kingdom.
110	9	"Dandy Dick"	Unknown	Unknown	1 March 1967	TBA
Previously aired in the United Kingdom.
111	10	"Dan, Dan the Charity Man"	Unknown	Unknown	8 March 1967	TBA
Previously aired in the United Kingdom.
112	11	"The Schoolmistress"	John Croyston	Unknown	15 March 1967	Yes
Australian production based on Old Tote show.
113	12	"The Cure for Love"	Unknown	Unknown	22 March 1967	TBA
Previously aired in the United Kingdom.
114	13	"The Initiate"	Unknown	Unknown	29 March 1967	TBA
Previously aired in the United Kingdom.
115	14	"Course for Collision"	Oscar Whitbread	Arthur Hailey	5 April 1967	Yes
By Arthur Hailey, starring Bill Yule, Carl Bleazby, Keith Lee, and Frank Wilson, and was produced in the ABC's Melbourne studios.
116	15	"An Hour with Joan Sutherland"	Unknown	Unknown	12 April 1967	TBA
117	16	"Madam Butterfly"	Peter Page	Unknown	19 April 1967	Yes
An opera production by Peter Page, in the Gore Hill Studios, Sydney, starring the Chinese soprano and film actress, Kiang Haw as Madam Butterfly, and an Asian cast.
118	17	Die Fledermaus	Unknown	Johann Strauss	26 April 1967	TBA
Melbourne production, starring Paul Eddey (sung by Raymond McDonald).
119	18	"Manon"	Unknown	Unknown	3 May 1967	Yes
An ABC production of the opera.
120	19	The Bartered Bride	Unknown	Unknown	10 May 1967	TBA
121	20	Episode not traced	Unknown	Unknown	17 May 1967	TBA
122	21	Episode not traced	Unknown	Unknown	24 May 1967	TBA
123	22	Episode not traced	Unknown	Unknown	31 May 1967	TBA
124	23	Episode not traced	Unknown	Unknown	7 June 1967	TBA
125	24	Episode not traced	Unknown	Unknown	26 July 1967	TBA
126	25	Episode not traced	Unknown	Unknown	2 August 1967	TBA
127	26	Episode not traced	Unknown	Unknown	9 August 1967	TBA
128	27	Untitled documentary on Australian ballet	Unknown	Unknown	16 August 1967	TBA
With Robert Helpmann (aired )
129	28	"Illyria"	Unknown	Unknown	23 August 1967	TBA
129	28	"Elektra"	Unknown	Unknown	23 August 1967	TBA
A double bill of two ballets.
130	29	"A Ride on the Big Dipper"	Christopher Muir	Ron Harrison	30 August 1967	Yes
131	30	"Love and War - Man of Destiny"	Patrick Barton	Unknown	6 September 1967	Yes
132	31	"Love and War - Sergeant Musgrave's Dance"	John Croyston	Unknown	13 September 1967	TBA
133	32	"Love and War - L'Flaherty, VC"	John Croyston	Unknown	20 September 1967	TBA
134	33	"Love and War - The Brass Butterfly"	John Croyston	Unknown	27 September 1967	TBA
135	34	"Love and War - Intersection"	John Croyston	Michael Boddy	4 October 1967	Yes
136	35	"Love and War - Construction"	Storry Walton	John Croyston	11 October 1967	TBA
137	36	"Love and War - Romeo and Juliet"	Oscar Whitbread	Alan Cole	18 October 1967	Yes
Romeo and Juliet.
138	37	Cathy Come Home	Unknown	Unknown	25 October 1967	TBA
Repeat.
139	38	"The Blackmailing of Mr S"	Unknown	Unknown	1 November 1967	TBA
By Michael Gilbert
140	39	"The Imposter"	Unknown	Unknown	8 November 1967	TBA
Labelled 'BBC production' in television guides.
141	40	"A Cherry on Top"	Unknown	Unknown	15 November 1967	TBA
Previously aired in the United Kingdom.
142	41	"A Cold Peace"	Unknown	Unknown	22 November 1967	TBA
Previously aired in the United Kingdom. Starring Britt Ekland.
143	42	"The Hothouse"	Unknown	Unknown	29 November 1967	TBA
Previously aired in the United Kingdom. With Diana Rigg
144	43	"Coppelia"	Unknown	Unknown	6 December 1967	TBA
A ballet labelled 'BBC production' in television guides.
145	44	"The Firebird"	Unknown	Unknown	13 December 1967	TBA
A ballet. Previously aired in the United Kingdom.
146	45	"She"	Christopher Muir	Unknown	20 December 1967	Yes
An Australian ballet.
147	46	"The Hollow Crown"	Unknown	Unknown	27 December 1967	TBA
By the Royal Shakespeare Company.

=== 1968 ===
No. overall	No. in season	Title	Directed by	Written by	Original release date	Original episode
148	1	"A Month in the Country"	Unknown	Unknown	1 January 1968	TBA
A British show.
149	2	"And Did Those Feet?"	Unknown	Unknown	8 January 1968	TBA
British.
150	3	"Where Angels Fear to Tread"	Unknown	Unknown	15 January 1968	TBA
151	4	"Carmen"	Unknown	Unknown	24 January 1968	Yes
An Australian opera production, produced by Peter Page, first in a series of four eopera.
152	5	"Louise"	Unknown	Unknown	31 January 1968	Yes
An Australian opera.
153	6	"Tosca"	Unknown	Unknown	7 February 1968	TBA
An opera.
154	7	"La Belle Helene"	Unknown	Unknown	14 February 1968	TBA
An opera.
155	8	"Neighbours"	Unknown	Unknown	21 February 1968	TBA
156	9	"The Pity of it All"	Unknown	Unknown	28 February 1968	TBA
157	10	"The Man Who Came to Die"	Unknown	Unknown	6 March 1968	TBA
158	11	"Man and Mirror"	Unknown	Unknown	13 March 1968	TBA
159	12	"The Lady with the Albatross"	Unknown	Unknown	20 March 1968	TBA
160	13	"The Importance of Being Earnest"	Unknown	Unknown	27 March 1968	TBA
161	14	"The Paraffin Season"	Unknown	Unknown	3 April 1968	TBA
162	15	"Shadow on the Wall"	Christopher Muir	Ru Pullan	10 April 1968	TBA
163	16	"Volpone"	John Croyston	Unknown	17 April 1968	TBA
164	17	"The Proposal and the Bear"	James Davern	Unknown	24 April 1968	TBA
165	18	"Salome"	Oscar Whitbread	Unknown	1 May 1968	TBA
With Frank Thring.
166	19	"Time Out of Mind"	Unknown	Unknown	8 May 1968	TBA
167	20	"A Beautiful Forever"	Unknown	Unknown	15 May 1968	TBA
168	21	"A Breach in the Wall"	Gilchrist Calder	Ray Lawler	22 May 1968	TBA
By Ray Lawler. A broadcast of a version originally produced and broadcast in the United Kingdom.
169	22	"The Best of the Bolshoi (part one)"	Unknown	Unknown	29 May 1968	TBA
170	23	"The Best of the Bolshoi (part two)"	Unknown	Unknown	5 June 1968	TBA
171	24	"This is Rudolph Nureyev"	Unknown	Unknown	12 June 1968	TBA
172	25	"The Silent Song"	Unknown	Unknown	19 June 1968	TBA
173	26	"Traveller Without Luggage"	Unknown	Unknown	26 June 1968	TBA
174	27	"A Soiree at Bossom's Hotel"	Unknown	Unknown	3 July 1968	TBA
175	28	"Stand Up, Nigel Barton"	Unknown	Unknown	10 July 1968	TBA
176	29	"The Coming-Out Party"	Unknown	Unknown	17 July 1968	TBA
177	30	"Are You Ready for the Music?"	Unknown	Unknown	24 July 1968	TBA
178	31	"Lysistrata"	Unknown	Unknown	31 July 1968	TBA
179	32	"The Shifting Heart"	Unknown	Unknown	7 August 1968	TBA
Based on the play by Richard Beynon.
180	33	"Dublin One"	Unknown	Unknown	18 September 1968	TBA
181	34	"Eugene Onegin"	Unknown	Unknown	25 September 1968	TBA
An opera.
182	35	"Pagliacci"	Unknown	Unknown	2 October 1968	TBA
An opera.
183	36	"Madame Butterfly"	Unknown	Unknown	9 October 1968	TBA
An opera.
184	37	"Peter Grimes"	Unknown	Unknown	16 October 1968	TBA
An opera.
185	38	"Shot Gun"	Unknown	Unknown	23 October 1968	TBA
186	39	"Are You There"	Unknown	Unknown	30 October 1968	TBA
187	40	"A Whistle and a Funny Hat"	Unknown	Unknown	6 November 1968	TBA
188	41	"The Gambler (part one)"	Unknown	Unknown	13 November 1968	TBA
189	42	"The Gambler (part two)"	Unknown	Unknown	20 November 1968	TBA
190	43	"The Queen's Bishop"	John Croyston	Unknown	27 November 1968	TBA
191	44	"Cobwebs in Concrete"	Patrick Barton	John Warwick	4 December 1968	TBA
192	45	"A Devil a Monk Would Be"	Unknown	Unknown	11 December 1968	TBA
193	46	"The Devil's Eggshell"	Unknown	Unknown	18 December 1968	TBA

=== 1969 ===
Wednesday Theatre in 1969 was a short run, and consisted almost exclusively of repeats.

No. overall	No. in season	Title	Directed by	Written by	Original release date	Original episode
194	1	"Two Way Stretch"	Unknown	Unknown	1 January 1969	TBA
195	2	"A Soiree at Bossom's Hotel"	Unknown	Unknown	15 January 1969	TBA
A repeated broadcast.
196	3	"Stand Up, Nigel Barton"	Unknown	Unknown	22 January 1969	TBA
A repeated broadcast.
197	4	"A Breach in the Wall"	Gilchrist Calder	Ray Lawler	29 January 1969	TBA
A repeated broadcast.
198	5	"The Silent Song"	Unknown	Unknown	5 February 1969	TBA
A repeated broadcast.
199	6	"The Coming Out Party"	Unknown	Unknown	22 October 1969	TBA
A repeated broadcast.
