= Aviation accidents and incidents in fiction =

Aviation accidents and incidents, particularly civilian airplane crashes or incidents threatening a crash or requiring an emergency landing, are a common theme in fiction. Films centered on such incidents make up a substantial subset of the disaster film genre, and influence how other stories within the genre are told. Works in this genre encompass both fictional depictions of the incidents themselves, and depictions of consequences such as investigations, lawsuits, and the effect on the lives of persons involved. A subgenre, the "plane crash survival movie", involves characters placed in a dangerous environment by an initial airplane crash. Airplane crashes have been described as "the easy and obvious device" for dramatically incorporating an airplane into the plot of a film, and as "a Hollywood staple", with various levels of praise or criticism directed to the realism of specific depictions.

== Development of the genre ==
A review of the genre by The Guardian following the release of the film, Sully, found that film to be "simply the next logical step in the long line of movies portraying with ever greater grim authenticity the waking nightmare of a plane going down". The Guardian noted that "in the age of mass air travel, the plane crash is one of the last great levellers", where everyone is equally at risk regardless of social status, but also found that "the thing about plane-crash movies is they come with happy endings, or at least the promise of one", and that the message is often "have faith in pilots". Notably, in some instances controversies have arisen from the release of films involving air crashes in proximity to unpredictably timed real-life air crashes. Another review assessing the 2012 film, Flight, also centered on a fictional airplane crash, stated that "when it comes to planes and pilots, Hollywood never gets it right", noting that contrary to some fictional accounts, pilots are almost never inebriated, and co-pilots are equally as qualified and capable as the assigned pilot for the flight.

=== Origins ===
Early films involving aircraft tended to focus on military air battles, or professional stunt flying activities, rather than depictions of civilian air incidents. An early example of the latter is seen in the events of the 1954 novel, Lord of the Flies, which was precipitated by a group of boys being marooned on an island in a plane crash. Harold Bloom writes that "[t]hrough the boys' dialogue... we learn that these boys and others were in a plane crash. The nose of the plane went down in flames, but the cabin crashed through the jungle trees, landing near enough to water to be pulled out to sea, perhaps with some boys still aboard". Bloom notes that the account provided has been deemed implausible by critics, as the story describes the child characters as having survived with no injuries, while leaving no adult survivors, and with the crash leaving a "long scar" in the jungle, but with no debris from the airplane.

Also in 1954, John Wayne starred in the film, The High and the Mighty, in which a veteran airline first officer, flying as a passenger on an airplane that has a catastrophic engine failure while crossing the Pacific Ocean, must help fly the plane to a safe landing. The High and the Mighty was one of the first films centered on a potential air disaster. This was shortly followed by Flight into Danger, a 1956 Canadian live television play written by Arthur Hailey and starring James Doohan, depicting the pilots at the controls of a Canadair North Star, a large commercial airliner, falling victim to food poisoning, leaving it to an ex-Second World War Spitfire fighter pilot among the passengers, to take over and safely land the unfamiliar aircraft. Hailey, a former British pilot in the Second World War, wrote the teleplay in only nine days and shopped it about as a screenplay. The Canadian Broadcasting Corporation, barely four years old, bought the script for $600.

=== Influence of Flight into Danger ===
When Flight into Danger was broadcast live-to-air on April 3, 1956, on the network's General Motors Theatre, it was seen by two million people and received a resounding positive reaction. "In the words of one journalist, it was 'probably the most successful TV play ever written anywhere'." A kinescope of the live production was broadcast in August 1956 due to viewer demand.

In 1957, Flight into Danger was adapted into the feature film Zero Hour! and, in 1962, the story was adapted for an episode of the BBC series Studio 4. In 1964, a German version of the television film was produced under the title Flug in Gefahr. Czechoslovak radio (Československý rozhlas) has produced it as part of the radio series Let do nebezpečí, directed by Jiří Horčička. An Australian television version was produced in 1966. In Flight into Danger, Hailey created the template for future disaster films: character-driven plot lines built up among diverse characters would dominate, with brief episodes or flashbacks giving back stories, and all the individual stories coming together at the climax. Hailey and John Castle novelized the story as Runway Zero-Eight (1958), which was dramatized in 1971 as Terror in the Sky, a Movie of the Week. The story elements were more famously parodied in the 1980 comedy Airplane!.

Additional aviation-themed precursors to the popular disaster films of the 1970s included Jet Storm and Jet Over the Atlantic, two 1959 films both featuring attempts to blow up an airplane in mid-flight; The Crowded Sky (1960) which depicts a mid-air collision; and The Doomsday Flight (1966), written by Rod Serling and starring Edmond O'Brien as a disgruntled aerospace engineer who plants a barometric pressure bomb on an airliner built by his former employer set to explode when the airliner descends for landing.

=== Influence of the Airport novel and film series ===
Flight into Danger author Arthur Hailey also penned the 1968 novel Airport, which was adapted into the first of a series of films in the genre. The novel was poorly reviewed, with Mark Levin of The New York Times saying, "Mr. Hailey is a plodding sort of writer, but he has just the talent to suggest the crashing ennui of airport routine, where only a mortal disaster can provide color". In the same newspaper, Eliot Fremont-Smith wrote, "As for the formula, the possibilities seem all but inexhaustible. With 'Hotel' and 'Airport' successfully absorbed, can 'Shopping Center,' 'Parking Lot' and 'City Dump' be far behind?" Still, the book was commercially successful among readers. It spent 64 weeks on the New York Times best seller list, 30 of which were at #1, and became the biggest-selling novel of 1968. George Seaton wrote and directed the film adaptation, which was released by Universal in 1970, whittling down the subplots of the novel to focus on the air disaster, the need to land a bomb-damaged plane at a snow-hampered airport. With an all-star cast, the film was nominated for ten Academy Awards, including Best Picture. It earned $100.5 million at the domestic box office (the equivalent of $833 million in 2025). Its success, combined with that of 1972's The Poseidon Adventure (set on a sinking ship), led to the proliferation of disaster movies of the 1970s.

Airport itself spawned the sequels, Airport 1975 (1974), Airport '77 (1977), and The Concorde ... Airport '79 (1979). In 1980, the highly successful parody film Airplane! was released, drawing on elements of Zero Hour! and the Airport film series. This was itself followed by a sequel, Airplane II: The Sequel, in 1982.

Directors have gone to great lengths to make plane crash scenes appear realistic. For example, for a scene in the 2020 film Tenet, in which a taxiing airplane is driven into a building (though without leaving the ground), the production demolished an actual airplane.

=== Plane crash survival subgenre ===
A review of the 2017 film The Mountain Between Us, which begins with a plane crash in remote mountains, notes the existence of the subgenre, the "plane crash survival movie". This subgenre involves characters placed in a dangerous environment—typically in frozen mountainous terrain—by an initial airplane crash. Films within this genre include Alive (1993), The Edge (1997), Cast Away (2000), The Snow Walker (2003), and The Grey (2010).

=== Plane crash investigation subgenre ===
Another area frequently explored in media, more commonly in police procedurals and detective shows, is the investigation of an airplane crash to determine the cause, particularly where foul play is suspected to have been involved. Such investigations may involve dramatic elements such as forensic recreations of the crash site, discovery and examination of the flight recorder, autopsies of the deceased, and interrogation of suspects among the survivors.

== Notable examples ==
=== Film ===
Year	Title	Notes
1954	The High and the Mighty	John Wayne stars as a veteran airline first officer flying as a passenger on an airplane that has a catastrophic engine failure while crossing the Pacific Ocean, and who must help fly the plane to a safe landing.
1956	The Mountain	Spencer Tracy stars as a veteran mountain climber who reluctantly assists his younger brother (Robert Wagner) to reach the wreckage of an airliner that fell on the Mont Blanc, in the French Alps, in order to scavenge the remains of the crashed aircraft. Based on La neige en deuil, a French novel published by Henry Troyat in 1952, inspired by the accident of Air India Flight 245 in 1950.
1965	The Flight of the Phoenix	Drawn from a 1964 novel by Elleston Trevor of the same title, the crash of a Fairchild C-82 Packet in the North African desert as central to the plot.
1970	Airport	Written and directed by George Seaton, focuses on a bomb-damaged plane attempting to reach and land at a snow-hampered Chicago airport.
1974	Airport 1975 (also known as Airport '75)	First sequel to the successful 1970 film Airport. It was directed by Jack Smight, produced by William Frye and Jennings Lang, and written by Don Ingalls. It concerns the dramatic events aboard an airborne Boeing 747 when a small aircraft crashes into the cockpit, causing the fatalities of senior crew and the blinding of the pilot, leaving with no one aboard qualified to take the controls. It featured an improbable scene in which a new pilot was brought to the plane by helicopter, to be lowered in through the hole in the cockpit.
1980	Airplane!	Genre parody in which the flight crew becomes ill due to food poisoning, and a former fighter pilot now suffering from a fear of flying is forced to land the plane.
1990	Die Hard 2	A British Douglas DC-8, Windsor Flight 114, is given false landing instructions by terrorists and crash lands in a blizzard, resulting in fatalities to all on board; a later scene has an airplane carrying the villains being blown up by protagonist John McClane (Bruce Willis).
1993	Alive	The true story of members of a Uruguayan soccer team who survive the crash of a Fairchild Hiller FH-227D operating as Uruguayan Air Force (Fuerza Aérea Uruguaya) Flight 571 T-571 in the Andean mountains, and had to find a way to stay alive until rescue. Industrial Light & Magic depicted the crash using an eight-foot breakaway model, designed to shear at mid-fuselage. The nose and tail were heavily reinforced while a non-reinforced midsection was built up of plastic, foil, wires and metals so that when it broke it would have the layered metal look of a real airframe breaking up. A cable system was rigged to fly the model, which was on an aligned track, into the miniature mountain, hitting the "sweet spot" on the fuselage, a weakened area barely three inches long.
1993	Fearless	Jeff Bridges stars as the survivor of an airplane crash whose perspective on life is changed by his surviving unharmed while others perished.
1997	Con Air	In the films's climactic crash scene, a C-123 where much of the action takes place crashes on the Las Vegas strip. Of three C-123s used in the production of the film, one was non-airworthy and in poor condition, was dismantled and its fuselage was used for filming the crash scene. Maxim put the film at the top of their 2007 list of "The Top Ten Most Horrific Movie Plane Crashes", a decision that was derided by Wired.
1998	U.S. Marshals	Depicts the crash of a 727 from the Justice Prisoner and Alien Transportation System (JPATS).
1999	Fight Club	A vivid mid-air collision occurs in the imagination of the protagonist.
2000	Bounce	A commercial flight crashes after one character had given his ticket on that flight to another, leading the surviving character to feel guilt over the death of the person to whom he had given his ticket.
2000	Cast Away	A plane crash leaves the protagonist, played by Tom Hanks, stranded on a Pacific island.
2000	Final Destination	A plane breaks apart and explodes in flight at the beginning of the film; passengers who escaped death by leaving the plane prior to takeoff due to a premonition are then stalked by death. A 2011 sequel, Final Destination 5, ends with the same plane crash that began the first film in the series.
2004	The Aviator	Leonardo DiCaprio stars in a biopic of Howard Hughes, including an incident where Hughes crashes while flying an airplane.
2006	United 93	Directed by Paul Greengrass, the film is a "forensic account of the 9/11 flight whose passengers resisted the hijackers", though the actual crash is not depicted, as the film "cuts to black as the plane starts to dive".
2009	Knowing	Nicolas Cage plays MIT astrophysics professor John Koestler, who discovers a record of future disasters, including a plane crash; he visits the site in advance of the crash, which happens in front of him.
2011	The Grey	An airplane crash in the wilderness pits crash survivors against the elements.
2012	Flight	A commercial flight crashes due to a technical malfunction, and the pilot, played by Denzel Washington, must invert the airplane in order to control the crash. An NTSB investigation results in the pilot confessing to have been drunk when the flight began, although that was not a factor in the crash.
2014	Wild Tales	Argentine anthology comedy with the first segment revolving around "a pilot gathering his unwitting enemies on a revenge flight"; at the end of the segment, the pilot crashes the plane into the house of his parents.
2016	Sully	Directed by Clint Eastwood and starring Tom Hanks as Sully Sullenberger, recreates the events around Sullenberger's Hudson River landing.
2017	The Mountain Between Us	A small plane crash in remote mountains leaves two survivors to navigate rugged terrain and fend off natural dangers in able to reach safety.

=== Television ===
Year	Title	Episode	Notes
1973	The Six Million Dollar Man	Pilot episode "The Moon and the Desert", aired March 7, 1973	Lee Majors, as Steve Austin, is the pilot in the crash of a Northrop M2-F2 NASA research aircraft during a test flight; Austin is severely injured and must be given bionic parts to save his life. The footage used was from a real M2-F2 accident that took place on 10 May 1967 in the California desert.
1981	Quincy, M.E.	Season 6 episode "Scream to the Skies", aired February 11, 1981.	The crash of Boeing 747 spurs Dr. Quincy's subsequent efforts to improve airline safety regulations.
2004	Lost	Pilot episode aired September 22, 2004	Deals with the crash of a commercial plane from the fictional Oceanic Airlines. This theme was inspired by the film Cast Away.
2012	Elementary	Season 1 episode "Flight Risk", aired November 8, 2012	A small plane crash turns out to be a cover-up for a murder. Holmes deduces that one of the four victims was murdered beforehand by the lack of bleeding. He concludes that sand was put into the fuel tank to disable the plane's engine and surmises the murder victim walked in on the perpetrator at work. His corpse was then stuffed in the cargo hold, which caused a weight imbalance and the subsequent premature crash, on land instead of water.
2012	Grey's Anatomy	Episode "Flight, aired May 17, 2012	Many of the main characters are injured in a small plane crash in a forest in the state of Washington, and they must struggle to survive the ordeal;
2014	Criminal Minds	Season 10 episode "A Thousand Suns", aired October 15, 2014	The investigation of a commercial airline crash reveals that it was caused by a disgruntled engineer who had found a way to remotely override airplane control systems.
2015	Grey's Anatomy	Episode "One Flight Down", aired April 16, 2015	The characters must deal with patients arriving at their hospital from a commercial airplane crash in Seattle.
2021	Yellowjackets	Pilot episode, aired November 14, 2021, and various other episodes	A New Jersey high school girls' soccer team has to fight to survive after crash landing in the Canadian wilderness in the 1990s.
2023	The Irrational	Season 1 episode, "The Barnum Effect", aired October 9, 2023	Centered on a commercial airline pilot apparently intentionally crashing a Boeing 737.

=== Other media ===
- Music video for the Katy Perry song "Roar", released on September 5, 2013: the crash of a small plane has left the protagonist stranded in the jungle, where she discovers her confidence and asserts control over the animals, while still using the crashed airplane fuselage as her home.
- Charlie Victor Romeo (1999), a play in which performers dramatically reenact FAA transcripts of crew communications during six real-life airplane crashes.
- The survival video game The Forest (2018) features a plane crash that brings the protagonist Eric LeBlanc and his son Timmy, to the peninsula; immediately after the plane crashes, the players must scavenge the wreckage for materials with which to survive. It is later shown that the villain of the game caused the crash, and that the protagonist has the choice of causing another plane to crash in the peninsula in order to bring his son back to life with a required child sacrifice.

== See also ==
- Aircraft in fiction
- Category:Fiction about aviation accidents and incidents
