= Flight into Danger (Wednesday Theatre) =

- Wednesday Theatre episode
- Episode no.: Season 2 Episode 40
- Directed by: Patrick Barton
- Teleplay by: Arthur Hailey
- Original air date: 14 September 1966
- Running time: 55 mins

Episode chronology
| ← Previous "Hamlet" | Next → "Twelfth Night" |

"Flight into Danger" is a 1966 Australian TV play. It was based on a 1956 Canadian TV play by Arthur Hailey which had been filmed as the movie Zero Hour!. The episode aired on 14 September 1966 in Melbourne, on 5 October 1966 in Sydney, and on 12 October 1966 in Brisbane.

Australian TV drama was relatively rare at the time.

== Plot ==
On a plane flight, passenger George Spencer is forced to take controls when the crew fall ill with food poisoning.

== Cast ==
- Ray Taylor as George Spencer
- John Godfrey
- Betty Bobbitt
- Wynn Roberts
- Frank Rich
- Keith Eden

== Production ==
The production starred TV personality Ray Taylor in his second television drama role; the first had been Ashes to Ashes, also for director Patrick Barton. Co-star Betty Bobbitt was best known for appearing on Daly at Night. Barton said, "Ray is extremely good in this role and manages to portray the anxiety the average man would feel when called on to land a large passenger plane."

== Reception ==
The Age called it "another local production that couldn't quite disentangle itself from technical shortcomings to get off the ground."
