= The Gioconda Smile (film) =

- The Age 30 Oct 1963
- Based on: short story by Aldous Huxley
- Written by: Norman Gear
- Directed by: Patrick Barton
- Country of origin: Australia
- Original language: English

Production
- Running time: 75 mins
- Production company: ABC

Original release
- Release: 30 October 1963 (Melbourne)
- Release: 6 November 1963 (Sydney)

The Gioconda Smile is a 1964 Australian television play based on a play by Aldous Huxley (which had originally been written as a short story). It was filmed in Melbourne.

== Plot ==
Henry Hutton is a wealthy man who lives in an English country house with his crippled wife, Emily, who is looked after by Nurse Braddock. Their neighbour is Janet Spence, an unmarried woman who looks after her crippled father and is in love with Henry. When Emily dies, Janet declares her love, but Henry is going to marry a younger woman. Then Nurse Braddock thinks the death might not be natural and demands an autopsy.

== Cast ==
- Alexander Hay as Henry Hutton
- Elizabeth Wing as Janet Spence
- Fay Kelton as Doris
- Williams Lloyd as Dr Libbard
- Roma Johnston as Nurse Braddock
- Kevin Colebrook
- Joan Letch
- Olga Tennison

== Production ==
The play began as a short story which had been turned into a 1948 stage play. This was then adapted into a TV play.

== Reception ==
The Sydney Morning Herald TV critic thought that the adaptation had "little left of this story' s original quality... the action and sets were curiously stiff and limited by TV standards, although some Hitchcock horror close-ups and the background music of a hysterical harpsichord added to its pretensions as a "whodunnit.""
