= The Queen's Bishop =

- Wednesday Theatre episode
- Episode no.: Season 4 Episode 43
- Directed by: John Croyston
- Based on: play by Joan Baldwin
- Original air date: 27 November 1968
- Running time: 60 mins

Episode chronology
← Previous "The Gambler (Part 2)"	Next → "Cobwebs in Concrete"

"The Queen's Bishop" is an Australian TV play. It aired on the ABC as part of Wednesday Theatre.

According to a TV Guide listing, the play is "about a family and their relationships to one another".

== Premise ==
Lady Simpson was the pivot around which her family revolved. Then she died, and the family collapses into a battle for leadership which threaten to tear the family apart. Sir Leonard Simpson tries to replace his lost Queen (Lady Simpson) with his secretary. The rest of the family rallies under the leadership of its Queen, Pauline, the wife of Sir Leonard's eldest son, Bede, to keep out the secretary, who they feel is an outsider.

== Cast ==
- Eve Wyn as Lady Simpson
- John Warwick as Sir Leonard Simpson
- Kay Taylor as his secretary
- Betty Lucas as Queen Pauline
- Ron Graham as Bede Simpson
- Martha Goddard
- Marion Johns
- Sheila Kennelly
- Helen Morse

== Production ==
The show was shot in Sydney.
