= Waiting in the Wings (Wednesday Theatre) =

- Wednesday Theatre episode
- Episode no.: Season 1 Episode 29
- Directed by: Patrick Barton
- Teleplay by: John Warwick
- Based on: Waiting in the Wings by Noël Coward
- Original air date: 21 July 1965
- Running time: 75 mins

Episode chronology
← Previous "How Do You Spell Matrimony?"	Next → "The Sweet Sad Story of Elmo and Me"

"Waiting in the Wings" is a 1965 Australian television play. It was filmed in Melbourne. "Waiting in the Wings" aired on 21 July 1965 in Sydney, and Melbourne.

== Premise ==
At a nursing home for elderly actresses, a newcomer causes trouble.

== Cast ==
- Patricia Kennedy
- Moira Carleton

== Reception ==
The critic from The Sydney Morning Herald thought that the "75 minutes were engagingly spent" with strong acting and direction.
