= Tartuffe (disambiguation) =

Tartuffe is a 1664 comedy play by Molière.

Tartuffe may also refer to:

- Tartuffe (1926 film), a German silent film
- Tartuffe (Wednesday Theatre), a 1965 Australian television film
- Le tartuffe, a 1984 French comedy film
- Tartuffe (Mechem), a 1980 opera by Kirke Mechem
