= Photo Finish (Wednesday Theatre) =

- Wednesday Theatre episode
- Episode no.: Season 1 Episode 43
- Directed by: Oscar Whitbread
- Teleplay by: John Warwick
- Based on: Photo Finish by Peter Ustinov
- Original air date: 10 November 1965
- Running time: 60 mins

Episode chronology
← Previous "The Bergonzi Hand"	Next → "The Casualties"

"Photo Finish" is a 1965 Australian teleplay based on a play by Peter Ustinov. It screened on ABC and was produced by Oscar Whitbread and starred Frank Thring. "Photo Finish" aired on 10 November 1965 in Melbourne and Sydney.

Thring played the role on stage the year before.

It was part of Wednesday Theatre. Australian TV drama was relatively rare at the time.

== Plot ==
A writer is visited by ghosts from his past – himself at the ages of twenty, forty, and sixty.

== Cast ==
- Frank Thring as Sam Kinsale, aged 80
- Elspeth Ballantyne
- Michael Duffield as the father
- Beverley Dunn as the mother
- Norman Ettling as the 40 year old
- Patricia Kennedy as Stella, the wife
- Patsy King
- Stanley Walsh as the 20 year old
- Raymond Westwell as the 60 year old

== Production ==
A version of the play had been performed on ABC the previous year.

== Reception ==
The Age said Thring "gave a striking performance" and praised the "sparkling dialogue".

The Sydney Morning Herald called it "excellent".
