= Cobwebs in Concrete =

- Wednesday Theatre episode
- Episode no.: Season 4 Episode 44
- Directed by: Patrick Barton
- Teleplay by: John Warwick
- Original air date: 4 December 1968
- Running time: 60 mins

Episode chronology
← Previous "The Queen's Bishop"	Next → "A Devil a Monk Would Be"

"Cobwebs in Concrete" is a 1968 Australian TV play written by actor John Warwick. It aired on the ABC as part of the anthology show Wednesday Theatre immediately after The Queen's Bishop. Australian TV drama was relatively rare at the time.

== Plot ==
A bridge over the Sunda River in Bali collapses killing four adults and 22 children. An investigation results. The bridge was built by Dan Fenner, an ambitious man in his early thirties. The design of the bridge brought him much acclaim. Investigations reveal various jealousies and passions.

== Cast ==
- Frank Wilson as Kruger, a financial tycoon
- Michael Duffield as Sir Miles Parker, chairman of the biggest construction group in England
- Wynn Roberts as Dan Fenner, a major bridge designer
- Ian Neal
- William Hodge as Cameron Fisher
- Peter Aanensen as Jason, a transport tycoon
- Lynn Lee
- Sheila Florence as Kathy
- Dennis Miller as Scott Harland

== Production ==
Frank Wilson was better known as a "song and dance man" at the time. The play was made in Melbourne's ABC studios.
