= Rusty Bugles (Wednesday Theatre) =

- Wednesday Theatre episode
- Episode no.: Season 1 Episode 25
- Directed by: Alan Burke
- Teleplay by: John Warwick
- Based on: Rusty Bugles by Sumner Locke Elliott
- Original air date: 23 June 1965

Episode chronology
← Previous "Louise"	Next → "School for Fathers"

"Rusty Bugles" is a television play episode of the Australian ABC television series Wednesday Theatre which aired on 23 June 1965.

== Cast ==
- Jack Allan as Mac
- John Armstrong as Andy
- Stuart Finch as Gig Ape
- Kerry Francis as Rod
- Guy le Claire as Darky
- Robert McDarra as Sgt Brooks
- Rod Moore as Keghead
- Graham Rouse as Vic
- Michael Thomas as Ot
- Mark Edwards
- Reg Gorman
- Charles Little
- Tony Bonner
- June Salter
- Mark Edmonds
- Reg Gorman as Ollie

== Production ==
It was Alan Burke's first production for the ABC since he returned from England where he had directed a TV production of The Harp in the South. it was shot at the ABC's studios in Sydney. Some of the language of the play was toned down for the adaptation. Burke said "I'm very excited about the play and I feel sure viewers will react the same way after they see it on tv."

It was designed by Kevin Brooks.

== Reception ==
The critic for The Sydney Morning Herald thought the adaptation blundered by not establishing where and when the play was set, saying the director "wasted speculation while a huge cast of strange characters passed before him — too many, in fact, to be accommodated comfortably in such short playing lime." He also felt the word "flamin' " was overused.

Another reviewer for the same paper noted the high use of the word "flamin" ("it got a flamin' good workout") while "the other word, which the wowsers took such exception to when the play was first staged in Sydney some 15 years ago, hardly got a look-in." However he thought "Alan Burke's production was a good, smooth job" and did "draw the pathos from the story."

The TV critic for The Age said it "came through as a worthwhile piece of Australiana which one should have seen."

The Bulletin said "most of the flavour" of the play came through in the adaptation.

The production was repeated in March 1966.
