= The Third Witness =

- Wednesday Theatre episode
- Episode no.: Season 2 Episode 34
- Directed by: Patrick Barton
- Teleplay by: Ron Callander
- Original air date: 17 August 1966
- Running time: 55 minutes

Episode chronology
← Previous "Eden End"	Next → "Almost a Honeymoon"

"The Third Witness" is a 1966 television play broadcast by the Australian Broadcasting Corporation. It was part of Wednesday Theatre. It aired on 17 August 1966 in Melbourne, on 24 August 1966 in Sydney, and on 7 September 1966 in Brisbane.

== Plot ==
The story was built around the military occupation of an uneasy middle east country and a modern version of the Resurrection. Private Gregory is a soldier in an army of occupation who us caught up when local events when a seer who caused a clash is executed and his body vanishes.

== Cast ==
- David Turnbull as Private Gregory
- Brian James
- Frank Rich
- Raymond Westwell
- Brian Hann
- David Telford
- Alan Tobian

== Production ==
It was shot in Melbourne. Writer Callendar based it on the Gospel of St Luke and the story of Gregory.

== Reception ==
The Age said it was "another of those uninhibited attempts to tell the gospel story in terms of 20th century events and people" like BBC's Golgotha and CBCs's Open Grave adding "by way of comparison the ABC's feature more than held its own."

== See also ==
- List of television plays broadcast on Australian Broadcasting Corporation (1960s)
