= Terry McDermott (actor) =

Australian stage, radio and television actor

- Born: 1928; Sydney, New South Wales, Australia
- Died: 14 December 2018 (aged 90)
- Occupation: Actor
- Years active: 1951–2003
- Known for: Homicide; Bellbird
- Spouse: Nathalie Kavanagh
- Children: 5

Terry McDermott (1928 – 14 December 2018) was an Australian stage, radio and television actor known for his roles in the series Homicide and Bellbird.

== Early life ==
McDermott was born in Sydney, Australia and his family later moved to Adelaide.

== Career ==
McDermott's began his career performing in the theatre, appearing in plays for the Adelaide Repertory Theatre and University Theatre Guild.

In Sydney, McDermott was a regular in the ABC radio serial Blue Hills, and also appeared in revues at Phillip Street Theatre. In 1963, he founded Sydney's Q Theatre alongside fellow performers Doreen Warburton, Ben Gabriel, Edward Hepple, Robert McDarra and Walter Sullivan. They contributed five pounds each to establish the company, enabling them to launch the Q Theatre Group’s Lunch Hour Theatre at the AMP Theatrette.

It was in television however, that McDermott made his breakthrough, playing the role of Detective Sergeant Frank Bronson, one of three main characters, in the Crawford Productions police series Homicide from its 1964 debut until 1966. He left the show due to a disagreement over contracts and concerns about performing his own stunts. His character was one of the first detectives killed off by an unknown Gerard Kennedy playing a Ronald Ryan-type escapee in Episode 58 entitled "Vendetta".

After a 1966 return to the stage as Bill Sikes in Oliver! and a 12 month stint in the stage production Man of La Mancha, McDermott joined the cast of the rural soap opera Bellbird as Max Pearson in 1969, remaining with the series until 1973. McDermott and fellow cast member Gary Gray produced Country Town, a feature film based on the series, with their newly formed company AVARGO ('have a go').

He had further television roles in Adventures of the Seaspray, Skippy, Division 4, Matlock Police, Bluey, Young Ramsay, Whiplash, The Sullivans, Skyways, Prisoner, Barrier Reef, Anzacs, Neighbours and Cop Shop. He also made a guest appearance in the Australian-filmed late-1980s reboot of Mission: Impossible, reuniting him with American actor Peter Graves, with whom he had worked on Whiplash 30 years earlier.

McDermott also continued to work extensively in theatre, in both plays and musicals. He toured nationally with J. C. Williamson's productions of Cactus Flower, The Amorous Prawn, The Constant Wife and Man of La Mancha. He was also involved numerous productions with Melbourne Theatre Company including London Assurance, The Doctor's Dilemma, Desire Under the Elms, The Play's the Thing, Freeway, Cyrano de Bergerac, Shindig, The Misanthrope and Cat on a Hot Tin Roof. He was also in a revival of Guys and Dolls and performed in the comedy Flexitime, which toured Australia for almost two years.

== Personal life ==
McDermott met his wife, teacher Nathalie Kavanagh in 1956, who was working on a production of The Glass Menagerie that he was performing in. They were married the same year. The couple had five children – Amanda, Bernadette, Guy, Michael and Tara. They lived between Sydney and Adelaide, before eventually settling in Upwey, an outer eastern of Melbourne. The family were churchgoers, attending Catholic Church of St Thomas More in Belgrave.

== Death ==
McDermott was diagnosed with Parkinson's disease in his late 70s and died from the disease on 14 December 2018, at the age of 90. At the time of his passing, he had 15 grandchildren and seven great-grandchildren.

== Filmography ==
=== Film ===
Year	Title	Role	Notes	Ref.
1963	Cruise of the Magi		Short film	
1971	Country Town	Max Pearson	Feature film	
1973	Squeaker's Mate	Doctor	Short film	
1977	The Mango Tree	Somers	Feature film	
1978	The Chant of Jimmie Blacksmith	M.P.	Feature film	
1979	Dimboola	Darcy	Feature film	
1984	Niel Lynne (aka Best Enemies)	Rob Lynne	Feature film	
1989	Against the Innocent	Senator / Journalist	Feature film	

=== Television ===
Year	Title	Role	Notes	Ref.
1957	The Adventures of Long John Silver	Man in tavern	1 episode	
1960–1961	Whiplash	Jack Sheridan / Tom / Slyter	3 episodes	
1962–1964	Consider Your Verdict	Detective Sgt Bronson / William Draper	3 episodes	
1963	Prelude to Harvest	James Ruse	TV movie	
1963	Tribunal	Walter Schwieger	1 episode	
1964–1973	Homicide	Detective Sergeant Frank Bronson / Lew Church	60 episodes	
1966	Ashes to Ashes	Servant / Mechanic	TV movie	
1966	Antigone	Chorus member	TV movie	
1966–1967	Australian Playhouse	Detective Hilton / Ben Peters / Detective / Alan Byers	4 episodes	
1967	A Ride on the Big Dipper	Clive Denning	TV movie	
1967	Adventures of the Seaspray		1 episode	
1968	Skippy	Hilton	1 episode	
1969–1973	Bellbird	Max Pearson	836 episodes	
1971	Barrier Reef	Commander Finch	1 episode	
1971–1974	Matlock Police	Thomas / Hank Turner / Neil King	3 episodes	
1972	Boney	Jim Oliver	1 episode	
1973	Ryan	Matt Vincent	1 episode	
1973; 1974	Division 4	Snr Sgt Clive Benson / Duff	2 episodes	
1974	Marion	Mr Smith	Miniseries, 3 episodes	
1976–1981	Cop Shop	Jacob Friedman / Jim Faulkner / Dr Murdoch / Doctor / Sgt Alec McEwan (uncredited) / Harvey Miller	11 episodes	
1977	Bluey	Inspector Bill Dermott	1 episode	
1977	Young Ramsay	Mr Eastwood	1 episode	
1977	The Sullivans	Mr Logan	4 episodes	
1979	Skyways	Fred Manning / Captain Gardner	3 episodes	
1980–1985	Prisoner	Brian Williams / Father Lennon / Mr Gardiner	4 episodes	
1981	Holiday Island	Max Costello	1 episode	
1983; 1984	Carson's Law	Mr Ernie Watson / Robson	2 episodes	
1984	Special Squad	Inspector	Episode 13: "Jacko"	
1985	Anzacs	Colonel (60th Battalion)	Miniseries, 1 episode	
1986	A Single Life	Judge	TV movie	
1989–1992	Tanamera – Lion of Singapore	Fire Chief	Miniseries, 7 episodes	
1990	Mission: Impossible	Mayor	1 episode	
1990	Col'n Carpenter	Terrence Berry	1 episode	
1990	Neighbours	John Bryce	6 episodes	
1994	Time Trax	John Barnett	1 episode	

== Theatre ==
Year	Title	Role	Notes	Ref.
1951	First Series Short Plays, 1951 season		Tivoli Theatre, Adelaide with Adelaide Repertory Theatre	
1951	Family Honour		Tivoli Theatre, Adelaide with Adelaide Repertory Theatre	
1952	Flowers for the Living		Tivoli Theatre, Adelaide with Adelaide Repertory Theatre	
1952	The Life and Death of King John	English Herald	Tivoli Theatre, Adelaide with Adelaide Repertory Theatre	
1952	The Brontes		Tivoli Theatre, Adelaide with Adelaide Repertory Theatre	
1953	Fireworks in the Morning	Josef Hoksa	University of Adelaide	
1965	Traveller Without Baggage		University of Adelaide with Adelaide Repertory Theatre	
1965	The Circle	Edward Lutton	University of Adelaide	
1955; 1956	Happy Returns		Phillip Street Theatre, Sydney	
1955	Nightmare Abbey		Genesian Theatre, Sydney	
1956	The Glass Menagerie	The Gentleman Caller	Genesian Theatre, Sydney	
1956	The Family Reunion		Genesian Theatre, Sydney	
1956	The Proposal		Genesian Theatre, Sydney	
1958	Titus Andronicus		Independent Theatre, Sydney	
1959	A Midsummer Night's Dream		Independent Theatre, Sydney, Theatre Royal, Adelaide	
1959	The Merchant of Venice	The Prince of Morocco	Theatre Royal, Adelaide, His Majesty's Theatre, Perth, Theatre Royal Sydney with J. C. Williamson's	
1959	King Lear	Duke of Albany	Theatre Royal, Adelaide, His Majesty's Theatre, Perth, Theatre Royal Sydney with J. C. Williamson's	
1959	The Winter’s Tale	Polixenes	Theatre Royal, Adelaide, His Majesty's Theatre, Perth, Theatre Royal Sydney with J. C. Williamson's	
1964	George		AMP Theatrette, Sydney with Q Theatre Company	
1966	Oliver!	Bill Sikes	Her Majesty's Theatre, Melbourne, Her Majesty's Theatre, Adelaide, His Majesty's Theatre, Perth, Canberra Theatre with J. C. Williamson's	
1966	Cactus Flower		Comedy Theatre, Melbourne, Theatre Royal Sydney with J. C. Williamson's	
1967	Luv		St Martins Theatre, Melbourne	
1967	Man of la Mancha	The Innkeeper	Comedy Theatre, Melbourne, Her Majesty's Theatre, Sydney, Her Majesty's Theatre, Adelaide, Comedy Theatre, Melbourne with J. C. Williamson's	
1973	The Play's the Thing		St Martins Theatre, Melbourne, Russell Street Theatre, Melbourne with MTC	
1974	Cat on a Hot Tin Roof	Big Daddy	St Martins Theatre, Melbourne with MTC	
1974	The Doctor's Dilemma		St Martins Theatre, Melbourne with MTC	
1974	The Misanthrope	Philinte	St Martins Theatre, Melbourne with MTC	
1974	London Assurance		St Martins Theatre, Melbourne with MTC	
1975	Shindig!		Russell Street Theatre, Melbourne with MTC	
1975	Much Ado About Nothing		Russell Street Theatre, Melbourne with MTC	
1975	The Freeway		Russell Street Theatre, Melbourne with MTC	
1976	Man of La Mancha	The Innkeeper	Her Majesty's Theatre, Melbourne, Her Majesty's Theatre, Sydney, Newcastle Civic Theatre with J. C. Williamson's	
1977	Desire Under the Elms	Ephraim Cabot	Melbourne Athenaeum with MTC	
1978	The Ship's Whistle		Pram Factory, Melbourne with Australian Performing Group	
1979	Flexitime	The Boss	WA, VIC, SA & TAS tour	
1982	Minna Von Barnhelm	The Landlord	Melbourne Athenaeum with MTC	
1982–1983	Last of the Red Hot Lovers	Barney Cashman, Director	Melbourne Athenaeum	
1985	Footrot Flats – The Musical	Cooch / Major	Australian tour with John Manford & Associates	
1985	Cyrano de Bergerac	Carbon de Castel-Jaloux	Playhouse, Melbourne with MTC	
1986; 1987	Guys and Dolls	Lt. Brannigan	Her Majesty's Theatre, Melbourne, Opera Theatre, Adelaide with National Theatre of Great Britain	
1990	The Night Visitor		Carlton Courthouse, Melbourne with Melbourne Workers Theatre	
1994; 1995	Me and My Girl	Charles, The Butler	Lyric Theatre, Brisbane, Princess Theatre, Melbourne, His Majesty's Theatre, Perth, Her Majesty's Theatre, Sydney	
1995	Tresno	Musician	Malthouse Theatre, Melbourne	
1995	Halter of This World		Roar 2 Studio, Melbourne	
1996	Anne of Green Gables	Matthew Cuthbert	Rippon Lea, Melbourne with Performing Arts Projects	
2003	Hello, Last Page of My Life		La Mama, Melbourne with Performing Arts Projects & Fly on the Wall Theatre	

== Radio ==
Year	Title	Role	Ref.
	Blue Hills		
c.1959–	Command Performance		
