= The Runaway (Wednesday Theatre) =

- Wednesday Theatre episode
- Episode no.: Season 2 Episode 42
- Directed by: Storry Walton
- Teleplay by: John Croyston
- Original air date: 19 October 1966
- Running time: 30 minutes

Episode chronology
← Previous "Twelfth Night"	Next → "The House"

"The Runaway" is a 1966 Australian television play. It aired on 19 October 1966 in Sydney, and on 16 November 1966 in Melbourne, on ABC as part of Wednesday Theatre.

It was written by John Croyston, who was better known as a producer; this was his first script for TV.

== Plot ==
In a Sydney suburb, the two sons of a hard working pastry chef of continental background are struggling with their own ambitions.

== Cast ==
- John Gray as Pop
- Edward Hepple as Grandpa
- Helen Morse as Jenny
- Lynne Murphy as mother
- Graham Dixon as George
- Ken James as Fred
- Bettina Smeaton as customer
- Sandy Harbutt
- Martin Harris

== Reception ==
The critic for the Sydney Morning Herald said the play "was not a work of genius, but it showed promise. The characters were fairly well drawn and their conflicts were credible though mundane. Troubles lay between father, and sons, mother and sons, between one son and his girl of a more affluent class. But the treatment lay flat. At one stage half the cast was explaining:. "We don't seem—you know what I mean—to get along or ... You know what I mean — understand each other." The cast did not help. All were flatter than the script and John Gray as the father gave a banal effort... Why did Storry Walton put up with the noise in the studio? And why didn't someone edit out the slow patches in the writing? All his faults counted against him, Croyston deserved a better first night."
