= Cross of Gold (Wednesday Theatre) =

- Wednesday Theatre episode
- Episode no.: Season 1 Episode 41
- Directed by: Patrick Barton
- Teleplay by: Richard Lane
- Based on: Eugénie Grandet by Honoré de Balzac
- Original air date: 27 October 1965
- Running time: 75 mins

Episode chronology
| ← Previous "Collect Your Hand Luggage" | Next → "The Bergonzi Hand" |

"Cross of Gold" is a 1965 Australian television film which aired on ABC. It is based on the 1833 novel Eugénie Grandet by Honoré de Balzac.

It was produced in ABC's Melbourne studios. It aired in a 75-minute time-slot. Per a search of their website, the National Archives may hold a copy, with running time listed as 1:14:33.

== Plot ==
Eugenei Grandet, daughter of a miserly financier, lends her cousin Charles 8,000 francs in gold which her father has given her as gifts over the years. Charles is to return to marry her but when he does he is a social climbing snob who has married another woman. Eugenie has the gold turned into a cross made of gold.

== Cast ==
- Allen Bickford as Charles Grandet
- Fay Kelton as Eugenie
- Raymond Westwell as Pete Grandet
- Christine Calcutt
- Penelope Shelton
- Kevin Colebrook as Cruchot
- Dennis Clinton
- Kenric Hudson

== Differences from the novel ==
In the novel, Eugenie spent her fortune on charity. In this version she became a miser.

== Reception ==
The Age called it "a complete success - a uniform, high quality cast, a first class play and imaginative, competent directing."

Filmink wrote "this was... fine."

== Radio adaptation ==
A radio adaptation of the film was made for ABC. The script was again written by Lane.
