= Antigone (Wednesday Theatre) =

- Wednesday Theatre episode
- Episode no.: Season 2 Episode 31
- Directed by: Patrick Barton
- Based on: Antigone by Sophocles
- Original air dates: 20 July 1966 (Melbourne): 3 August 1966 (Sydney); 24 August 1966 (Brisbane)
- Running time: 70 mins

Episode chronology
← Previous "The Unbearable Bassington"	Next → "Mr Byculla"

"Antigone" is a 1966 Australian TV play directed by Patrick Barton. It was made to celebrate the 2,500th anniversary of Greek Theatre.

== Plot ==
Antigone, daughter of Oedipus, is sentenced to death by Creon, King of Thebes, for defying his orders and burying the body of her dead brother.

== Cast ==
- Liza Goddard as Antigone
- Raymond Westwell as Creon
- Kevin Colebrook as Teiresias
- John Derum as Haemon
- Joan McArthur as Eurydice
- Anne Charleston as Ismene
- Kevin Miles as Chorus Leader
- Allan Bickford as Chorus Member
- Brian Burson as Chorus Member
- Edward Howell as Chorus Member
- Terry McDermott as Chorus Member
- John Godfrey as Chorus Member
- Frank Rich as Sentry
- Lloyd Cunningham as Messenger
- Peter Curtin

== Production ==
It was filmed in Melbourne. Barton said the role of Antigone "is usually reserved for the stage's established stars. But Liza is quite staggering." He aimed to make the production as realistic as possible and based costumes on photos of peasants in Crete and Greece.

== Reception ==
The Age thought Westwell "did not quite succeed in projecting the intensity of the personal conflict" and the Goddard "seemed over emotional."

Filmink wrote "this is fine. It hasn’t been adapted particularly well for television – there’s a lot of reporting of things that happen off stage (like the death of Creon’s wife… you can show that sort of thing, you know). Raymond Westwell’s incredibly restrained reaction to the deaths of Creon’s son and wife was a legitimate performance choice, but perhaps one influenced by the fact that the director, and actor were British."
