= The Tower (Wednesday Theatre) =

- Wednesday Theatre episode
- Episode no.: Season 1 Episode 17
- Directed by: Christopher Muir
- Teleplay by: Noel Robinson
- Based on: A play by Hal Porter
- Original air date: 2 December 1964
- Running time: 75 mins

Episode chronology
← Previous "The Big Killing"	Next → "Daphne Laureola"

"The Tower" is a 1964 TV play broadcast by the Australian Broadcasting Corporation. It aired on 2 December 1964 as a stand-alone in Melbourne and on 28 April 1965 as part of Wednesday Theatre in Sydney. It aired on 6 January 1965 in Brisbane. It was based on a play by Hal Porter and directed by Christopher Muir in the ABC's studios in Melbourne.

== Premise ==
In 1850s Hobart Sir Rodney Haviland builds a tower. He lives with his sister Hester and ex convict, Knight. Amy Armstrong is Sir Rodney's step daughter and resents his new 19 year old wife Selina. So too does Rodney's 14-year-old son Edwin.

Amy is having an affair with the convict Marcus Knight. Sir Rodney is trying to arrange a marriage for Amy that will advance his prospects in London. Amy has learned that his 14 year old adopted son Edwin is really the son of Knight. Sir Rodney winds up throwing Amy off the top of the tower.

== Cast ==
- Andrew Guild as Edwin Haviland
- Judith Arthy as Selina, Lady Haviland
- Keith Lee as Sir Rodney Haviland
- Mary Ward as Hester Fortescue
- Rex Holdsworth as Tom Perry
- Jim Lynch as Marcus Knight
- Fay Kelton as Megan
- Anne Charleston as Amy

== Original play ==
The play was published in a collection of Australian plays in 1963 (others included Douglas Stewart's Ned Kelly and Alan Seymour's The One Day of the Year) before it had even been performed. It had won the Sydney Journalists Club Prize in 1962. The Elizabethan Theatre Trust had an option on the play but did not exercise it.

It was first produced in London in February 1964.

The fact the play had its world premiere in England not Australia was much commented on at the time.

== Radio productions ==
The play was performed for Australian radio in 1964.

== Production ==
In February 1964 The Age reported that the play was being adapted for television.

The play started rehearsing in Melbourne in October 1964. "It's a wonderful part," said Guild, best known for playing the Artful Dodger on stage in the Australian production of Oliver!. "At least the Dodger is a loveable sort of young crook but Edwin is really awful. He has no warmth or softness at all.I shocked myself sometimes when doing the part."

ABC designer Alan Clark and scenic artist Len Lauva collaborated on a 20 ft x 12 ft authentic backdrop of the Derwent River, Constitution Dock and the scattered houses of early colonial Hobart. They used old prints to recreate what the view from Sir Rodney's balcony and tower would be like.

== Reception ==
The critic for The Sydney Morning Herald wrote that the play was:

Notable as a rare instance of an Australian playwright's attempting to represent the tension between good manners and bad intentions. Porter has taken advantage of the colonial time lag in 19th century Tasmania to allow his characters to clothe their generally poisonous motives in an 18th century decorum, and to make use of an unusually hemstitched and hand-sewn type of language. The easy and tempting criticism to make of this play is that it is stagey and derivative (with a "Rebecca"-like storm and an Ibsenesque tower of a most clumsily symbolic kind) and that it is as fniitily stocked with curtain lines as anything George Miller might present at the Neutral Bay Music Hall... Much depended in this televised version on its tactfulness in making the most of the play's richly theatrical srrokes without emphasising their potential absurdities. In this Porter was well served.

The Canberra Times said the play's "weakness is in its over slylisalion, overstatement and melodrama. It is a splendidly theatrical play of its type, and it ought to have made rather better television than it did in Christopher Muir's production."

== See also ==
- List of television plays broadcast on Australian Broadcasting Corporation (1960s)
