= Course for Collision =

- Wednesday Theatre episode
- Episode no.: Season 3 Episode 13
- Directed by: Oscar Whitbread
- Teleplay by: Arthur Hailey
- Original air date: 30 November 1966
- Running time: 60 mins

Episode chronology
← Previous "The Initiate"	Next → "An Hour with Joan Sutherland"

"Course for Collision" is a 1966 Australian TV play.

It aired as part of Wednesday Theatre on 5 April 1967 in Sydney, and on 30 November 1966 in Melbourne. Australian TV drama was relatively rare at the time.

== Plot ==
In the near future, the US president faces a challenge.

== Cast ==
- Bill Yule as Major Hale
- Carl Bleazby as the President
- Keith Lee as Captain Shaw
- Frank Wilson as General Patrick
- Tim Evans
- Mike Dyer
- Jon Ewing
- George Mallaby (actor)

== Production ==
It was shot in Melbourne.
