= Write Me a Murder (Wednesday Theatre) =

- Wednesday Theatre episode
- Episode no.: Season 1 Episode 47
- Directed by: Henri Safran
- Teleplay by: Kenneth Hayles
- Based on: Write Me a Murder by Frederick Knott
- Original air dates: 8 December 1965 (Sydney, Melbourne)
- Running time: 60 mins

Episode chronology
← Previous "The Cruel Deadline"	Next → "The Search"

"Write Me a Murder" is a television play that aired in 1965 as part of ABC's Wednesday Theatre. It was directed by Henri Safran. Murder mysteries were a popular subject matter on Australian television at the time.

== Cast ==
- Rhod Walker as Clive Rodingham
- Alan Edwards as David Rodingham
- John Gray as Charles Sturrock
- Judith Fisher as Julie Sturrock
- Gwen Plumb as Elizabeth Wooley
- Bob Haddow as Constable Hackett

== Production ==
The show was made in Sydney. Francesca Crespi did the design. Henri Safran, who directed, said the drama came from not wondering "whodunnit" but from "will the murderer get caught".

== Reception ==
The Bulletin said "Safran tried to force life into the mummified corpse of another of those traditional British murder mysteries, set in a decaying mansion and suffering from mouldy plot."
