= Listen to the Lion (film) =

- Directed by: Henri Safran
- Written by: Robert Hill
- Produced by: Robert Hill
- Starring: Wynn Roberts
- Cinematography: Malcolm Richards
- Edited by: Mervyn Lloyd
- Music by: Michael Carlos
- Production company: Stockton Ferri Films
- Release date: 5 September 1977
- Running time: 52 mins
- Country: Australia
- Language: English
- Budget: $36,000

Listen to the Lion is a 1977 short feature from Australia.

== Plot ==
A Sydney derelict lies drunk in an alley and is beaten up by thugs. A friend helps him find refuge in a night shelter. As he lies dying he has a vision of himself flying about the room. The man dies and after the cremation of his corpse, his spirit returns to the footpath.

== Cast ==
- Wyn Roberts as Hunter
- Barry Lovett as One legged man
- Syd Heylen as Hunter's friend
- John Derum as Evangelist
- Les Foxcroft as Night shelter man

== Production ==
The film was written by Robert Hill, a former journalist who spent months researching the life of homeless people in Sydney. A substantial portion of the budget was provided by the General Production Fund of the Australian Film Commission.

== Reception ==
The film won Greater Union Award for Best Fiction Film at the 1977 Sydney Film Festival and the Robert Mamoulian Award for the most distinguished Australian short film.

Although shot before Storm Boy (1976), also directed by Henri Safran, it was not released until after that film.
