= The Sweet Sad Story of Elmo and Me =

- Wednesday Theatre episode
- Episode no.: Season 1 Episode 30
- Directed by: Henri Safran
- Teleplay by: Ric Throssell
- Based on: Dr. Homer Speaks : 'Oh, Ai-lar-tsua Farewell' by Ric Throssell
- Original air date: 28 July 1965
- Running time: 45 mins

Episode chronology
← Previous "Waiting in the Wings"	Next → "The Winds of Green Monday"

"The Sweet Sad Story of Elmo and Me" is a 1965 Australian television film which aired on ABC as part of Wednesday Theatre. It aired on 28 July 1965 in Melbourne and Sydney.

A satire about suburbia, it was written by Canberra-based writer Ric Throssell and aired in a 60-minute time-slot. It was produced in ABC's Sydney studios by Henri Safran.

According to one paper, "Throughout the play the author pokes his tongue at suburbia, materialism, education and television, among other things."

== Plot ==
"Digger" Smith returns from World War II to his wife Shirl a baby girl, Betty, and a modest house in the suburbs. A happy, uncomplicated man, "Digger" Smith stays so until prosperity catches up with him and he makes strenuous efforts to "keep up with the Joneses." Betty's boyfriend is Elmo.

== Cast ==
- Ron Haddrick as "Digger" Smith
- Lynette Curran as Betty
- Chuck Kehoe as Elmo Senior
- Brian Hannan as Elmo Junior
- Doreen Warburton as Shirl
- Alexander Hay as a teacher
- John Armstrong as lift attendant
- Bill Mullikie as parson
- Lynette Haddrick as Betty as a child
- Max Brophy as Elmo as a Child
- Reg Gorman

== Original Play Dr Homer Speaks ==
It was based on a stage play by Ric Throssell that was first performed at the Canberra Festival in 1963 under the title Dr Homer Spakes. It was the 25th play by Throssell, who worked for the Department of External Affairs. He called the play a comic cartoon for the theatre. He also said it was a satire on crew cuts and king-sized culture.

The theatre viewer for the Canberra Times said "It has little to recommend it save an inconsequential humor. The situations are strained, the plot is weak, the dialogue empty and what message it may have is soon lost in boredom induced by strident over-emphasis. Last night's presentation did little to assist one to take it seriously as a work of art." This review prompted several responses.

== Production ==
Throssell said the play was twice the length of the TV version. Dr Homer was a prologue character in the play who had been cut and Throssell said the style had been changed.

Ron Haddrick's real'life daughter, Lynette, player his onscreen daughter. It was the only time during her childhood she worked as an actor, although this was to become her career as an adult.

It was directed by Henri Safran, who said, "If they play could be described in one word, 'satire' would be as close as you could get."

Barbara Major did the design.

== Reception ==
The Sun Herald critic wrote, "It was well done, whatever it was.... It was fast moving, all right. Elmo started out as a baby, and finished up as a grey-haired tycoon. Somewhere in the one hour of bafflement there was also Ron Haddrick brilliantly playing something or other, and Doreen Warburton as his wife. Accents switched from Australian to American, dollar bills floated from the sky, and it wound up in what looked like the Australian bush. Somewhere there was a message, but it escaped me. At any rate, it is good to see the A.B.C. with enough courage to tackle such an offbeat offering... Whatever it was, they did it extremely well."

The TV critic for The Sydney Morning Herald wrote "the price of experimentation either by producer or audience is high and half way through The Sweet Sad Story... many viewers must have switched off and gone to their beds shaking their heads and muttering 'I thought it was modern but it's beyond me'... a gallant effort to drag television out of its depressing orthodoxy...[but] a few hunks of raw and undissolved irony in a pale gruel of unreality."

The Canberra Times called it "pleasant... Slight it was (and only 45 minutes in this version), but considerably entertaining. It was, I would say, as well written and better produced than an f.a.q. import from the BBC or Redif fusion. The satire was mostly gentle, mostly familiar - to aficionados of Barry Humphries and university revues, it was from time to time a little stronger, a little more jolting than we are accustomed to see on television... The satire was made at once more palatable and more beneficial by Mr Safran's choice of cast and designer."

The Age called it "a bright effort, well staged, well acted and with an ingenious script."

The Bulletin said his "only possible reaction is to sit like a stunned mullet wondering was it all a ridiculous dream, and finally peering around to discover whether he is alone in all this."

== See also ==
- List of live television plays broadcast on Australian Broadcasting Corporation (1950s)
