= Twelfth Night (Wednesday Theatre) =

- Wednesday Theatre episode
- Episode no.: Season 2 Episode 41
- Directed by: Ken Hannam
- Original air date: 12 October 1966
- Running time: 90 mins

Episode chronology
← Previous "Flight into Danger"	Next → "The Runaway"

"Twelfth Night" is the 41st episode of the second season of the Australian anthology TV series Wednesday Theatre and is based on the play of the same name by William Shakespeare. "Twelfth Night" aired on ABC Television network on 12 October 1966 in Sydney, on 26 October 1966 in Melbourne, and on 16 November 1966 in Brisbane. The play was directed by Ken Hannam and it starred Roger Climpson and Helen Morse.

== Cast ==
- Judith Fisher as Viola
- Mark McManus as Sebastian
- Helen Morse as Olivia
- Roger Climpson as Orsino
- Lola Brooks as Maria
- John Gregg as Sir Toby Belch
- Alexander Hay as Feste
- Donald McDonald as Malvolio
- Alister Smart as Curio
- Martin Redpath as Valentine
- John Llewellyn
- David Copping

== Reception ==
The Bulletin called it "lively" with "a high standard of acting, diction, and intelligence".

The Sydney Morning Herald wrote there was "some gracious acting" but added "regrets remain for the inadequate way in which everything else was presented".
