= Campaign for One =

- Wednesday Theatre episode
- Episode no.: Season 1 Episode 45
- Directed by: Brian Faull
- Teleplay by: Anthony Church; Marielaine Double
- Original air date: 24 November 1965
- Running time: 60 mins

Episode chronology
← Previous "The Casualties"	Next → "The Cruel Deadline"

"Campaign for One" is a 1965 Australian television film. A remake of an episode of the BBC series Wednesday Play, it aired in a 60-minute time-slot on ABC on 24 November 1965 in Melbourne, Sydney, and on 5 January 1966 in Brisbane. as part of Wednesday Theatre.

It was not unheard of during the 1960s for British anthology episodes to be remade for Australian television.

It was a rare Australian drama on a science fiction theme.

== Plot ==
Set in 1967, an English astronaut, Phil Osborne, is in orbit for the Allied Commission of German, English and American specialists. After completing a spacewalk, he announces that he has no intentions to return to Earth, due to his wife leaving him, and would prefer to die in space.

== Partial cast listing ==
- Stanley Walsh as Phil Osborne
- Lynne Flanagan as Osborne's wife
- Michael Duffield
- Carl Bleazby
- Mark Albiston
- Edward Howell

== Production ==
It was shot in Melbourne. Faull said, "There was real suspense and a true-to-life drama about it. One couldn't help but feel that the situation could arrive sometime. We were producing Campaign for One at the same time space projects were going on at Cape Kennedy, and with all the news reports about, there was a feeling that the play was the real thing."

A large seesaw rig was used to simulate walking around outside an orbiting capsule.

== Reception ==
Reception was mixed. '"Canberra Times called it "an undistinguished play" and said it had a "preposterous pommy script". By comparison Australian Women's Weekly (see section Death Wish in Space) called it "one of the best local TV productions for ages" and said the spacewalk sequence was "most skillfully produced".

The Sydney Morning Herald called it "brilliant" with "sustained tension, highly competent performances by a well-knit cast and whipped-up direction which left no one time to wonder what to do with his hands... a most exciting and professional job by any standards."

The Sunday Sydney Morning Herald called it "a nice, taut, well-produced bit of space drama... a gripping and highly credible thriller."

== See also ==
- Ending It – 1939 BBC TV short remade for ABC TV in 1957.
- Box for One – 1949 BBC TV drama remade for ABC TV in 1958
- List of live television plays broadcast on Australian Broadcasting Corporation (1950s)
