= The Swagman =

- Wednesday Theatre episode
- Episode no.: Season 1 Episode 13
- Directed by: Henri Safran
- Teleplay by: Ian Stuart Black
- Original air date: 31 March 1965
- Running time: 60 mins

Episode chronology
← Previous "A Season in Hell"	Next → "A Time to Speak"

"The Swagman" is a 1965 Australian television play. It aired as part of Wednesday Theatre on 31 March 1965 in Sydney and Melbourne.

Despite being set in Australia, it was written by a British writer.

A copy of the production is held at the National Archives of Australia.

== Plot ==
Jack and Jane Bell are a married couple who live on a small sheep farm. Jane is a young Englishwoman who cannot adjust to the isolation of the outback.

Jane becomes attracted to the hired hand, a young Australian-born Italian, Tony. Jane and Tony arrange to be alone on the farm for one night, but their romantic plans are spoiled by the arrival of a swagman .

== Cast ==
- June Thody – Jane Bell
- Vincent Gil – Tony
- Don Reid – Jack Bell
- Edward Hepple – The Swagman
- Brenda Sender

== Production ==
The play was written by English author Ian Stuart Black who had never visited Australia. It was selected for production by Henri Safran. It was the world premiere of the play.

The play was shot in ABC's studios in Gore Hill, Sydney. The swagman was played by Edward Hepple, an English-born actor who had moved to Australia a number of years previously.

== Reception ==
The TV critic for The Sydney Morning Herald said Safran "avoided the common fault of accentuating the Australian features" of the play. "An Australian production which does not stamp 'this is Australia' on any local subject matter may be said to make great strides in maturity and competence and there was promising evidence of this in excellent acting, capable camera work and fluency of treatment."

Another critic from the same paper said that although the play "had... some holes in its... story big enough to sink the entire cast and author combined, it came off as one of the finest bits of Australian drama from the A.B.C.'s Sydney studios... an absorbing bit of stuff. It plunged straight into the centre of the story with a minimum of preamble, the cast all turned in workmanlike performances, and action and suspense (even with those implausible holes) was sustained to the last."

A critic from The Canberra Times said the pay "opens tautly with not a moment wasted in creating the setting for a night of adultery" but that the writer was "unable to sustain this idea in the same vein. Overt blackmail by the tramp becomes the means of this progressive intrusion rather than the more subtle action of the couple's own guilt and fear. Paradoxically, the dramatic inevitability and tension arc shattered.

The Age TV critic said "it offended Australian women by implying bush wives are as hard as nails to swagmen... it made repeated and I think unnecessary, disparaging references to Italian migrants... painted a false picture of the swagman... the producer's quest for 'realism' provided early embarrassment with protracted scenes of passion on the bed which left nothing to the imagination... [the ABC] should have warned viewers of the 'torrid' scenes in store. One hesitates to slam the ABC so hard for presenting a drama with an Australian theme. But the viewer has the right to expect dramas selected by the national network to have merit, and not to be produced on the strength of the title alone, which seems to have been the case here."

Another column in The Age used the play to discuss the uncertainty of Australian censorship laws and called it "unquestionably a well-designed, well-presented, well-acted play. But why the ABC has to concentrate so much on raw meat and the unwholesome passeth all understanding."

=== Controversy ===
The screening of the program prompted letters of complaint from viewers.

One letter called it a "sordid ugly spectacle of a married woman being outraged." This led to a series of correspondence.

The Canberra Times called it among the best locally produced television dramas of 1965.

== Radio version ==
The play was adapted for radio and broadcast by the ABC on 30 May 1965.

== See also ==
- List of live television plays broadcast on Australian Broadcasting Corporation (1950s)
