= Daphne Laureola (Wednesday Theatre) =

- Wednesday Theatre episode
- Episode no.: Season 1 Episode 18
- Directed by: Patrick Barton
- Teleplay by: John Warwick
- Based on: Daphne Laureola by James Bridie
- Original air date: 5 May 1965
- Running time: 75 mins

Episode chronology
← Previous "The Tower"	Next → "Cinderella"

"Daphne Laureola" is a 1965 Australian television play based on Daphne Laureola by James Bridie. It screened as part of Wednesday Theatre.

Australian TV drama was relatively rare at the time.

It was dedicated to Dame Edith Evans, who had played the part on stage.

== Plot ==
A young Pole, Ernest, falls in love with the older, alcoholic Lady Pitts, when they meet in a London restaurant.

== Cast ==
- Raymond Westwell as Sir Joseph Pitts
- Terry Aldred as Lady Pitts
- Edward Howell
- Mark Albiston as Ernest
- Simon Chilvers
- Sydney Conabere
- William King
- Elspeth Ballantyne
- Jeffrey Hodgson
- Georgie Alcock
- Wayne Maddern

== Reception ==
The TV critic for the Sydney Morning Herald thought it was "the kind of play which, if anyone cares then, will be a period piece in 30 years' time... It is not a particularly good or compelling play and while it was given an excellent performance from the ABC Melbourne studios... it emerged as pretty dated... [even though it was made] rather unconvincingly contemporary."

The play itself was described by critic Alan Riach as having "Egalitarianism.. at the heart of this vision, but idealism may be just a liability."
