= Madam Butterfly (Wednesday Theatre) =

- Wednesday Theatre episode
- Episode no.: Season 3 Episode 15
- Directed by: Peter Page
- Based on: Madama Butterfly by Giacomo Puccini
- Original air date: 19 April 1967

Episode chronology
← Previous "An Hour with Joan Sutherland"	Next → "Die Fledermaus"

"Madam Butterfly" is a 1967 Australian TV adaptation of Puccini's opera Madama Butterfly. It aired on 19 April 1967 as part of Wednesday Theatre.

It was produced by Peter Page in the Gore Hill Studios, Sydney, starring the Chinese soprano and film actress, Kiang Haw as Madam Butterfly, and an Asian cast.
