= Macbeth (Wednesday Theatre) =

1965 Australian television play

- Wednesday Theatre episode
- The Age, 22 September 1965
- Episode no.: Season 1 Episode 37
- Directed by: Alan Burke
- Based on: Macbeth by William Shakespeare
- Original air date: 22 September 1965
- Running time: 90 mins

Guest appearance
- Wynn Roberts

Episode chronology
| ← Previous "The Door" | Next → "Dark Corridor" |

"Macbeth" is a 1965 Australian television play, an episode of Wednesday Theatre. It is an adaptation of the play Macbeth by William Shakespeare and aired on 22 September 1965 in Sydney and Melbourne, and on 27 October 1965 in Brisbane. The play had previously been filmed by ABC in 1960 with Keith Goodlet in the title role.

== Cast ==
- Wynn Roberts as Macbeth
- Terri Aldred as Lady Macbeth
- Keith Eden as Macduff
- Keith Lee as Banquo
- Clark Bleazby as Ross
- Allan Lander as Lennox
- Mark Albiston as Malcolm
- Michael Duffield as Seyton
- Peter Hepworth as Fleance
- Joan Harris as Lady Macduff
- Patricia Kennedy, Roma Johnston and Agnes Dobson as the witches
- Sydney Conabere, Lloyd Cunningham, Nevil Thurgood as murderers

== Production ==
The production was directed by Alan Burke who said, "I always approach Shakespeare with reverence, but not with awe. Someone once said, 'A producer should read every new play as if it were Shakespeare, and Shakespeare as if it were a new play.' I heartily agree with this... The main value of the play is inside the minds of its characters. TV, with its revealing close-ups, is the ideal medium with which to demonstrate this."

It was set in the year the play was written, around 1600, rather than when Shakespeare originally set it, around 1100. This meant the characters wore traditional tartans. "Our aim was authenticity," said Burke. "Every detail was thoroughly researched - the tartans, costumes and swords. The atmosphere of a battle in the eeriness of a misty forest could not have possibly been recreated in a studio, but we found the perfect location for it in Mount Macedon."

The final battle was shot in Mount Macedon over two days, involving a cast and crew of 83 in all. Wardrobe manager Keith Clarke said "the kilts had to be carefully planned and supervised; otherwise with 30 men fighting enthusiastically we could have ended up with a few nasty accidents."

The bulk of filming was done at the ABC studios in Ripponlea, Melbourne.

Trevor Ling was the designer.

== Reception ==
The Age called it "ambitious and, generally, extremely competent. It was an encouraging experiment in what can be done to popularise Shakespeare."
