= Frank Wilson (Australian actor) =

Australian actor (1924–2005)

- Born: Frank Edward Wilson; 11 April 1924; Northcote, Victoria, Australia
- Died: 24 October 2005 (aged 81)
- Occupations: Actor; singer; director; television presenter

Frank Edward Wilson (11 April 1924 – 24 October 2005) was an Australian film, stage and television actor; musical comedy singer and director; and television game show and variety host.

== Early life ==
Frank Wilson was born in 1924 in the Melbourne suburb of Northcote. He left school at the age of 13. In 1943, he joined the Australian Army, where he served as a Signalman in Borneo and Papua New Guinea until his discharge in 1945.

== Career ==
He began acting in 1947, when he appeared at Melbourne's Tivoli Theatre.

Wilson had a small role as a cane cutter in Summer of the Seventeenth Doll (1959).

His best-known film appearances were in The Club (by David Williamson; a role that Wilson had created on stage), Crackerjack, Breaker Morant, Black Robe and Money Movers. He also appeared in the 1957 Charlie Chaplin film A King in New York. On television he appeared in Changi (a mini-series written by John Doyle), SeaChange, Blue Heelers, Water Rats, Power Without Glory, A Country Practice, Bellbird, Doctor Down Under and other programs.

His stage work included Guys and Dolls, Wonderful Town, Lola Montez, Damn Yankees, How to Succeed in Business Without Really Trying (which he directed), and as Falstaff in Shakespeare's Henry IV, Part 2.

David Williamson wrote the character of Frank in Travelling North for Wilson, having admired his interpretation of Jock Riley in The Club. However, after creating Frank on stage, Wilson was not given the role in the film adaptation — it went to Leo McKern instead. To television audiences, he was the well-known and encouraging compere for the influential amateur talent show New Faces throughout the 1960s to mid-70s.

== Awards ==
He won a Logie Award for Best Compere in 1972 for New Faces.

His last role, in the short film The Chess Set (by Alexander Murawski) won the Best Actor award at the New York International Independent Film and Video Festival. Wilson heard this news the day before he died.

== Family ==
Wilson and his wife Beryl had 4 children: Amanda, Damian (dec), Matthew and Shauna. Matthew and Shauna went on to become child actors. He had 7 grandchildren.

== Filmography ==
=== Film ===
Year	Title	Role	Type
1957	A King in New York		Feature film
1959	Summer of the Seventeenth Doll (aka Season of Passion)		TV movie
1962	Lola Montez	Sam	TV movie
1966	Course for Collision	General Patrick	TV movie
1968	Cobwebs in Concrete	Kruger	TV movie
1974	The End Product	Fowler	TV movie
1974	Alvin Rides Again	House Detective	Feature film
1975	The Great Macarthy	Mayer	TV movie
1976	Kill Kaplan	Sumarian	TV movie
1977	The Importance of Keeping Perfectly Still		Short film
1978	Patrick	Det Sgt Grant	Feature film
1978	Money Movers	Lionel Darcy	Feature film
1979	The Journalist	Vic Parsons	TV movie
1980	The Club	Jock Riley	Feature film
1980	Breaker Morant	Dr. Johnson	Feature film
1980	Fatty Finn	Lord Mayor	Feature film
1986	News Report on a Journey to a Bright Future		Film
1987	Going Sane	Sir Colin Grant	Feature film
1987	Tudawali	Charles Chauvel	TV movie
1988	The Riddle of the Stinson	Robinson	TV movie
1988	Empire of Ash	Shepherd	Feature film
1989	Slow Burn	Captain Fahey	TV movie
1991	Ultimate Desires	Detective Southard	Film
1991	Black Robe	Father Jerome	Feature film
1995	Surrender	Gordon	Short film
1997	The Well	Francis Harper	Feature film
2002	Crackerjack	Len Johnson	Feature film
2005	The Chess Set	Karl	Short film

=== Television ===
Year	Title	Role	Type
1950	The Billy Rose Show		TV series, 1 episode
1953	Robert Montgomery Presents		TV series, 1 episode
1967	Bellbird	Howard Bates	TV series
1969-74	Division 4	Ronald Davies, Inspector Tom Hogan, Robert Gibson, Curtis Moore, George Peck, Billy Mullens	TV series, 14 episodes
1971-75	Matlock Police	George Price, John Alexander, Hatcher, Dan Hall, Ted Jackson, Ted Mitchell, Fred Murray, Murray Dawes	TV series, 8 episodes
1971-76	Homicide	John Mason, Bennie Miller, Brooks, Inspector Green, David Cook, Paul Mason, Divisional District Inspector, Ian Taylor	TV series, 8 episodes
1972	New Faces	Compere	TV series
1973-74	Ryan	Bob Novak, Jack Hayes, Dr Thomas, Palmer	TV series, 4 episodes
1974	Marion	Publican	TV miniseries, 3 episodes
1974	And the Big Men Fly	J J Forbes	TV series, 6 episodes
1976	Power Without Glory	Tom Trumbleward	TV miniseries, 4 episode
1976	The Bluestone Boys		TV series
1976-79	The Sullivans	Godfrey, Herman Wintzer	TV series, 7 episodes
1977	Bluey	Detective Sergeant Hennessy	TV series, 1 episode
1977-80	Cop Shop	Larry Page, Superintendent Ray Clarke, Inspector Mitchell	TV series, 5 episodes
1978	Glenview High		TV series, 1 episode
1978	The Truckies	Wally	TV series, 12 episodes
1979	Skyways	Defence Barrister, Frank Sefton	TV series, 3 episodes
1979-80	Doctor Down Under	Dr. Beaumont	TV series
1980	Lawson's Mates		TV series, 1 episode
1981	I Can Jump Puddles	Mr Fulsham	TV miniseries, 2 episodes
1981	Tickled Pink	Thrubb	TV series, 1 episode
1981	Prisoner	Mr Justice Myles	TV series, 1 episode
1981-82	Holiday Island	Banjo Patterson	TV series, 64 episodes
1983	Scales of Justice	Sir John Ritchie	TV series, 1 episode
1984	Carson's Law	Garrick Senior	TV series, 5 episodes
1984	Special Squad	Dorahee	TV series, 1 episode
1985	Neighbours	Victor Armstrong	TV series, 2 episodes
1985	Golden Pennies	Doc Slope	TV series, 7 episodes
1986	The Great Bookie Robbery	Winton Bathurst	TV series, 3 episodes
1982-87	A Country Practice	Hank McCoy, Knuckles, Dr Rupert Clarke	TV series, 6 episodes
1988	Rafferty's Rules	David Morris	TV series, 1 episode
1989	The Flying Doctors	Karl Szalinski	TV series, 1 episode
1989-92	Dearest Enemy	Walter Tyler	TV series, 14 episodes
1992	Police Rescue	Mr Bridger	TV series, 1 episode
1994	G.P.	Eddie	TV series, 1 episode
1997	Big Sky	Sir Douglas Oglivie	TV series
2001	Changi	Old Gordon	TV miniseries
1999-2000	SeaChange	Len Connors	TV series, 3 episodes
2000	Blue Heelers	Maurie Lawson	TV series, 1 episode
2000	Water Rats	Billy Russell	TV series, 1 episode
2003	Welcher and Welcher	Judge	TV miniseries, 1 episode
