= Tartuffe (Wednesday Theatre) =

- Wednesday Theatre episode
- Episode no.: Season 1 Episode 39
- Directed by: Henri Safran
- Teleplay by: John Warwick; Henri Safran
- Based on: Tartuffe by Molière
- Original air date: 13 October 1965
- Running time: 75 mins

Episode chronology
| ← Previous "Dark Corridor" | Next → "Collect Your Hand Luggage" |

"Tartuffe" is a 1965 Australian television film directed by Henri Safran and starring Tony Bonner and Ron Haddrick. It was an episode of Wednesday Theatre and filmed in Sydney at ABC's Gore Hill Studios. It aired on 13 October 1965 in Sydney and Melbourne, and on 20 October 1965 in Brisbane.

Australian TV drama was relatively rare at the time.

== Plot ==
Tartuffe convinces the rich merchant Organ he is a saint. Organ agrees for Tartuffe to marry his daughter although Tartuffe is actually interested in seducing Organ's wife.

== Cast ==
- Ron Haddrick as Tartuffe
- Jennifer Wright as Elmire
- Doreen Warburton as Dorine
- John Gregg as Oleante
- Ron Morse as Organ
- Roberta Hunt as Mmse Pernelle
- Charles Little as Damis
- Lucia Duchenski as Marianne
- John Stevens as Loyale
- Jerome White as an officer
- Doris Goddard as street girl
- Tony Bonner as Valere

== Production ==
Henri Safran said the play was "less a satire of hypocrisy than a condemnation of those who, by exaggerating their religious devotion, become prey for the cupidity of imposters."

== Reception ==
The Canberra Times acclaimed it as one of the best productions of the year.

The Age called it "a thoroughly enjoyable experience."
