= The Piccadilly Bushman =

Play by Ray Lawler

- Original language: English
- Written by: Ray Lawler

Premiere
- Date: 12 September 1959
- Place: Comedy Theatre, Melbourne

The Piccadilly Bushman is a 1959 Australian play by Ray Lawler. It concerns an expatriate Australian actor who returns to Australia from England to star in a film adaptation of a successful Australian novel.

The Piccadilly Bushman was originally produced as a commercial tour of Melbourne, Sydney, Brisbane and Adelaide by J.C. Williamson's, premiering at Melbourne's Comedy Theatre on 12 September 1959.

Melbourne's Playbox Theatre Company revived the play at the CUB Malthouse in 1998.
