= Against the Innocent =

- Directed by: Daryl Dellora
- Starring: Terry McDermott; Nico Lathouris; Alex Menglet; Pamela Rabe
- Release date: 1989
- Country: Australia
- Language: English

Against the Innocent is a 1989 Australian film about terrorism, directed by Daryl Dellora.

== Cast ==
- Nico Lathouris as Tim McKenzie
- Alex Menglet as Karl Heinman
- Margaret Cameron as Monica Schleyer
- Terry McDermott as Senator / Journalist
- Pamela Rabe as American Woman
