= General Motors Theatre =

Canadian TV series

- Also known as: CBC Theatre; Encounter; General Motors Presents
- Genre: Drama anthology
- Countries of origin: Canada and United States
- Original language: English
- No. of seasons: 6 (5 original, 1 year of UK programme called Interplay)

Production
- Production location: Toronto, Ontario, Canada
- Running time: 60 minutes

Original release
- Network: CBC Television
- Release: 18 September 1952 – 1 January 1961

General Motors Theatre (also known as CBC Theatre, Encounter, and General Motors Presents) is a Canadian television anthology drama series of television plays, which ran on CBC Television under various titles from September 18, 1952, until January 1, 1961, and in the United States on ABC from October 5 to November 2, 1958. The series mainly consisted of one-hour episodes of romance, adventure, or mystery stories, with some social realist drama plays.

== Cast and crew ==
British and Canadian actors such as Patrick Macnee and Barry Morse were among those who appeared in plays produced in the strand. The series also supported the earlier careers of many Canadian actors such as William Shatner and Austin Willis. Canadian James Doohan starred in one of the most successful plays in the strand, Flight into Danger in 1956.

The series was a breeding ground for writing and directing talent such as William Kotcheff, Donald Jack, and Arthur Hailey. Hailey's Flight into Danger was later remade as the feature film Zero Hour!, in turn providing the inspiration for the comedy film Airplane!, and was also screened by the BBC in the United Kingdom. It was a significant factor in General Motors Theatre producer — and CBC Supervisor of Drama — Sydney Newman moving to work in the UK, where he later worked on anthology series similar to General Motors Theatre, such as Armchair Theatre and The Wednesday Play.

== Canadian run ==
First transmitted under the sponsored title on October 5, 1954, a new 60-minute drama was aired each week. As suggested by the title, the program was sponsored by the General Motors automobile company. It was effectively the same series as the unsponsored CBC Theatre, which had run its first season from December 1, 1953, to April 20, 1954, with General Motors becoming the title sponsor for the second season.

The series moved to a Sunday evening slot in 1956, where it had competed with the American network CBS's enormously popular game show spin-off The $64,000 Challenge in the key Toronto market (where American broadcast signals could be received from across the border), and General Motors removed their sponsorship. They returned as sponsor in 1958 after The $64,000 Question had been cancelled, under the new title General Motors Presents.

For its final run in the summer of 1961, the series did not have originally-produced dramas but broadcasts of a bought-in British anthology series called Interplay.

== American run ==
The show was one of the first Canadian programs to be sold to an American network. ABC had planned to air 39 episodes of the series but aired only five. Renamed Encounter, it was scheduled to follow the western series Colt .45. The program faced competition on CBS from Alfred Hitchcock Presents and The $64,000 Question. Also, NBC at the time aired part of The Dinah Shore Chevy Show. In the Fall (Autumn), of 1958, on ABC, it replaced Scotland Yard, for five weeks.
