= A Ride on the Big Dipper =

- Wednesday Theatre episode
- Episode no.: Season 3 Episode 28
- Directed by: Christopher Muir
- Teleplay by: Ron Harrison
- Original air date: 30 August 1967
- Running time: 60 mins

Episode chronology
← Previous "Elektra"	Next → "Love and War - Man of Destiny"

"A Ride on the Big Dipper" is a 1967 Australian television play. It screened as part of Wednesday Theatre and had a running time of one hour.

== Plot ==
Hugh Kenton, is a 25 year old draughtsman with an engineering firm who is assessed by an efficiency expert as having an all-time high rating as potential management material. He is sent to North Queensland to take charge of the company's branch office. Kenton rapidly proves that he is indeed a brilliant manager - far more so than his associates ever believed.

== Cast ==
- Terry McDermott as Clive Denning
- Peter Aanensen
- Alan Bickford
- Fay Kelton
- Lloyd Cunnington

== Production ==
It was written by Newcastle journalist Ron Harrison. He later adapted it for radio. The radio version won an Awgie Award. It was shot in Melbourne at the ABC's studios in Ripponlea.

== Reception ==
The Age said it "offered some fine parts and the actors did not disappoint."

The Sydney Morning Herald said "it held a tense interest."

The Bulletin called it "what TV drama should be. [Terry] McDermott gave a well-paced, intelligent performance as an efficiency - Frankenstein who got clobbered by his own mother in the cold, bloodless mayhem of business. Nothing novel or exciting in the plot, but everything so in seeing it in Australian terms; a believable drama of the times, with believable dialogue. As it was Harrison’s second TV play, and his first one-hour drama, I can only echo the ABC’s Phillip Mann, who said, "It was the kind of work we receive all too rarely, and we hope he intends to stay with it." A sense of drama seems to be the rare old some thing he's got, and here's hoping he is a stayer, because he seems to have the field to himself."
