= A Breach in the Wall =

1967 episode of British TV series Wednesday Theatre

- Wednesday Theatre episode
- Directed by: Gilchrist Calder
- Teleplay by: Ray Lawler
- Original air date: 29 March 1967
- Running time: 70 mins

Episode chronology
← Previous "Stand Up, Nigel Barton"	Next → "The Silent Song"

"A Breach in the Wall" is a 1967 TV play by Ray Lawler about the remains of Thomas a'Beckett being discovered behind a church wall.

It was made for British TV and screened as a Wednesday Theatre. It also screened in Australia on 22 May 1968.

Lawler later adapted the script into a stage play for the town of Canterbury.

== Plot ==
In the near future, the parish church of the Kentish village of Valham is undergoing long-overdue restoration largely made possible by the fund-raising efforts of the able and radical young incumbent, Lewis Patterson. A walled-in chamber is discovered and within it is a coffin sealed with the crest of Thomas Becket. This is discovered by Katherine Elliott.

The Archbishop of Canterbury is convinced the remains are Becket's as does Cardinal Runan and they decide to turn it into a shrine. Patterson tries to persuade them otherwise.

== Cast ==
- Robert Harris as the Archbishop
- Barry Justice as Reverend Lewis Patterson
- John Phillips as Cardinal Runan
- Rosemary Leach as Katharine Elliott
- Paul Hardwick as Canon Charles Humphrey
- Jennifer Daniel as Sue Patterson
- Kynaston Reeves as Dr. Matthews
- John Bryans as Dr. Sadler
- John Kidd as Dr. Aslam
- Frances Alger as Eunice Street
- Donald Morley as Brian Tracy
- Hilda Braid as Mrs. Street
- William Moore as Constable Howell
- Barbara Graley as Miss Spain
- Nicholas Brent as Eddie Street
- John Tatham as Bourke

== Production ==
Lawler converted from Anglicanism to Catholicism in 1966 but says he had the idea for the play beforehand.

Lawler said "I don't pretend that this is necessarily how events would shape themselves if the situation arose. But I do believe that the historical significance of Thomas A'Beckett is contained in certain words from the play: 'A saint is somebody who spends his life on earth in bringing mankind nearer heaven, and his life hereafter bringing heaven nearer men'."

== Reception ==
The Observer called it "for the most part... compulsively viewable."
