= A Time to Speak =

- Wednesday Theatre episode
- Episode no.: Season 1 Episode 14
- Directed by: Patrick Barton
- Teleplay by: Noel Robinson
- Original air date: 7 April 1965
- Running time: 60 mins or 75 mins

Episode chronology
← Previous "The Swagman"	Next → "Time and the Conways"

"A Time to Speak" is a 1965 Australian television film that aired on ABC. This period drama, set around 1900, was written by Noel Robinson. It was the third production to air within a three- week period. The film premiered on 7 April 1965, in Sydney and Melbourne.

== Premise ==
In the year 1900, a religious community, known as the Community, is led by the Elder. One of its inhabitants, Esther, seeks out a local doctor, Gilly, and asks if he can provide care for a young girl who is mentally impaired. Gilly recommends a course of treatment for the girl, who then returns to the Community.

However, several days later, the girl tragically dies. Gilly diagnoses pneumonia as the cause of death and begins to wonder about the influence of the Elder on the girl's fate. Gilly's wife, Anne, expresses her desire for her husband to leave the area, just like their friend Chad.

== Cast ==
- Raymond Westwell as the Elder
- Wynn Roberts as the doctor, Gilly
- Keith Eden as Chad Jensen
- Joan MacArthur as the leader's wife, Sister Esther
- Patsy King as Annie, the doctor's wife
- George Whaley as John
- Michael Howley as Matthew
- Martin Magee as Benjamin
- Edward Howell as Man

== Production ==
It was filmed in Melbourne with location footage at Montsalvat near Eltham. Director Patrick Barton said he chose Montsalvat because it had a huge meeting hall, a courtyard and the inside of a cottage. Cast members Raymond Westwell and Joan MacArthur were married in real life. ABV-2's outside broadcast unit, normally used for sport and actuality programs was used for the location scenes.

== Reception ==
The Australian Woman's Weekly TV critic called it "a meaty play", and said she "particularly liked the understated ending".

The Canberra Times said it was "a good play, well suited to television, and simply loaded with righteousness enough for all those people who found the honest, healthy lust of The Swagman was not their . . . cup of tea."

The TV critic for The Sydney Morning Herald said the play was "an uncommonly arresting drama about the conflict of personalities" in which the director "used the austere and sombre setting of a farm community to good effect. Some of the scenes were rather abrupt, as was the ending, but generally tension was maintained well."

== Radio ==
The play was also adapted for radio.
