= Hansel and Gretel (Wednesday Theatre) =

- Wednesday Theatre episode
- Episode no.: Season 2 Episode 52
- Directed by: Peter Page
- Based on: Hansel and Gretel by Engelbert Humperdinck
- Original air date: 13 October 1963
- Running time: 60 mins

Episode chronology
← Previous "Cinderella"	Next → "Orpheus in the Underworld"

"Hansel and Gretel" is a 1963 Australian TV adaptation of the opera Hansel and Gretel by Engelbert Humperdinck.

It screened as an episode of Wednesday Theatre in 1966. It aired on 13 October 1963 in Sydney, and on 20 October 1963 in Melbourne.

== Cast ==
- Brian Gilbert as Hansel (to the voice of Marilyn Richardson)
- Jacki Weaver as Gretel (to the voice of Janet Rutledge)
- Justine Rettick as the Witch
- Nita Maughan as the mother
- Russell Smith as the father
- Margaret Moray as the dew fairy (sung by Chesne Ryman)
- Ngaire Thomson as the Sandman (sung by Diane Holmes)

== Production ==
It was an early role for Jacki Weaver who played Gretel and was aged 16; she had just appeared as Cinderella in a pantomime at Philip Street. Brian Gilbert, who played Hansel, was 13. The show was recorded during the visit to Australia of Australian conductor Charles Mackerras. He conducted the Sydney Symphony Orchestra while the opera was videotaped.

It was taped in September.

== Reception ==
Sydney Morning Herald commented on the limitations of the sets but nevertheless called it "an extremely agreeable 90 minutes of tuneful make-believe"
