= Raymond Westwell =

British actor and director

- Born: Arthur Raymond Gilbert Smith Westwell; 6 January 1919; Salford, Lancashire, England
- Died: 23 November 1982 (aged 63); Kensington, London, England
- Occupations: Actor, Director
- Spouse: Joan Isabella MacArthur (m. 1950 – 1975; her death)

Raymond Westwell (6 January 1919 – 23 November 1982) was a British actor and director who worked for many years in Australia. He made his Australian TV debut in The Angry General. He worked as a director of theatre, notably Camelot.

== Select credits ==
- The Angry General (1964)
- Romanoff and Juliet (1965)
- A Time to Speak (1965)
- Daphne Laureola (1965)
- Cross of Gold (1965)
- Photo Finish (1965)
- Othello (1965)
- The Third Witness (1966)
- Antigone (1966)
- V.I.P.P. (1966)
- Point of Departure (1966)
- The Five Sided Triangle (1967)
- Die Fledermaus (1967)
