= Ashes to Ashes (Wednesday Theatre) =

- Wednesday Theatre episode
- Episode no.: Season 2 Episode 18
- Directed by: Patrick Barton
- Teleplay by: Marc Brendel
- Original air date: 27 April 1966

Episode chronology
← Previous "The Sound of Murder"	Next → "Tosca"

"Ashes to Ashes" is a 1966 Australian comedy thriller television play which screened as part of Wednesday Theatre on 27 April 1966 in Melbourne, on 4 May 1966 in Sydney, and on 11 May 1966 in Brisbane.

== Plot ==
Paris Beaumont has a whirlwind romance with Barbara Manson, marries her, and takes her to his house in Port Campbell. When Barbara finds a case containing women's clothing she starts asking questions about his first wife's disappearance.

== Cast ==
- Ray Taylor as Paris Beaumont
- Gerda Nicolson as Barbara Manson
- Terry McDermott as Tregembo
- John Royle
- Kevin Colebrook
- Michael Howley
- Diana Wilson
- Moira Carleton
- Gerard Kennedy

== Production ==
The play starred Ray Taylor, best known for being a TV presenter. His variety program The Ray Taylor Show had been cancelled just before production of Ashes to Ashes. Taylor had some experience acting in repertory in England; he described the play as "a fun sort of thing".

Taylor said "it's a darn good play and I wouldn't mind doing some more but my time is taken up writing a play of my own."

It was based on an English play but set in Australia. Location filming took place at Port Campbell and Como House, South Yarra. Taylor said "it's kinky, switched on or whatever you like to call it in The Avengers style."

The script had a character referring to amounts over £1 as "quids" and those under as "cents". The Sydney Morning Herald asked light-heartedly if this was having "two bob each way".

== Reception ==
The Age said "The ABC should take a bow" claiming Taylor gave "an excellent performance slightly reminiscent of the urbane George Sanders... The suspense is well contrived and sustained."

The Sydney Morning Herald said Taylor "played out his own macabre sense of humour" in the play adding "he showed a magnetic side of his personality, but it would be interesting to see him playing a part further removed from his own self to assess Taylor the actor."
