= A Season in Hell (Wednesday Theatre) =

- Wednesday Theatre episode
- Episode no.: Season 1 Episode 12
- Directed by: Henri Safran
- Teleplay by: Patricia Hooker
- Original air date: 1 April 1964
- Running time: 80 mins

Episode chronology
| ← Previous "The Fate of Man" | Next → "The Swagman" |

"A Season in Hell" is a 1964 Australian TV movie broadcast on the ABC which originally aired as an episode of Wednesday Theatre. It was directed by Henri Safran from a script by Patricia Hooker and was shot at the ABC's Gore Hill Studios in Sydney. "A Season in Hell" aired on 1 April 1964 in Sydney, on 22 April 1964 in Brisbane, and on 29 April 1964 in Melbourne.

It was arguably the first depiction of a gay relationship in Australian TV drama. Filmink magazine argues "it ranks among the finest TV plays ever made in Australia."

== Plot ==
The plot deals with the relationship between Arthur Rimbaud (Alan Bickford) and Paul Verlaine (Alistair Duncan). Rimbaud arrives in Paris age 16 and in three years shocks and revolts all who knows him. His only friend and confidante is Verlaine.

== Cast ==
- Alan Bickford as Arthur Rimbaud
- Alastair Duncan as Paul Verlaine
- Marion Johns as Madam Verlaine, Verlaine's mother
- Anne Haddy as Mathilde Verlaine
- Betty Dyson as Madame Matue de Falureville, Mathilde's mother
- Eve Hardwicke as Rimbaud's mother, Madame Rimbaud
- Richard Davies as Father Martin
- Patricia Hill as Isabelle Rimbaud
- Susanne Haworth as Isabelle (child)
- Michael Thomas as Frederick Rimbaud
- Zennie Angliss as Vitalie Rimbaud
- Robyn Richards as Marie
- Ronald Morse as Official
- Stanislav Polonski as Waiter

== Production ==
Patricia Hooker says the friendship of the two men always fascinated her (in 1962 she wrote an episode of a radio show, Poets Corner which focused on Rimbaud), but originally felt it would be necessary to study in France to achieve an authentic background. However she then worked on Concord of Sweet Sounds with Henri Safran, a director originally from France, who became interested in her idea of a play about Rimbaud. Hooker said, "With his help it was possible to collect the information I needed, much of which had never been translated from the French."

"Surely there's no obligation on Australian playwrights to dwell exclusively on the subject of Australia past and present," said Hooker. "That field, I think, is becoming rather crowded. If a subject interests e, no matter what its derivation, and I am satisfied with its legitimacy, I write about it. My main aim is to do a craftsman-like job."

She researched the project for two-three months and wrote it in two weeks. "The research was very difficult," she said. "There are not a great deal many sources available in Australia but I managed to read about 13 to 14 books on the subject. I must admit that I became fascinated by the discover that there seemed not to be any previous study of the subject as I was attempting."

Alan Bickford was 19 when cast to play the 16 year old Rimbaud.

It was one of 20 TV plays produced by the ABC in 1964 (and one of only three Australian scripts - the others were The Angry General and The Winds of Green Monday).

The set was designed by Doug Smith.

Filmink argued "this is quite racy stuff to get on our screens, especially in 1964 (remember, South Australia didn’t decriminalise homosexuality until 1975). I can only assume the script got past the censor because it was (a) based on real people of historical importance, (b) set in the previous century, making the subject matter less scary, (c) concerned French poets, who no one expects to behave well, so it’s not shocking when they don’t, (d) a story that ends in tragedy and misery, so while the leads may be gay they’re never happy, and (e) treated with tact and taste, for all the absinthe drinking (an unworldly person could watch it and think Rimbaud and Verlaine were just good friends)."

== Reception ==
The television critic for the Sydney Morning Herald thought the play "was thoughtfully and capably built on known episodes" from the two poets' lives but "suffered by its very episodic character, as well as from the impossibility of supplying several essentials to true story' s full realisation." He added "if the play was a gallant but incomplete effort, its production by Henri Safran was beautifully assured and sensitive, its camera work expert, while an excellent cast was headed by the impressive performances of Alastair Duncan as Verlaine and Alan Bickford as Rimbaud."

The Sunday Sydney Morning Herald called it "a first class production... one of the finest efforts to come from the studios at Gore Hill. It was top notch in all departments."

The Bulletin said "Hooker’s script was essentially a duologue with vignettes, and, although too episodic and uneven in its construction and development, incorporated the visions and images of the poet into the context of the relationship with considerable success only occasionally did Rimbaud step out of the play and declaim. Henri Safran’s production had style and atmosphere. He suggested the deliberately underwritten homosexual tensions by inference rather than by presentation, and he evoked the claustrophobic relationship by isolating the two poets in tight two-shots."

The Canberra Times said the play "in writing, acting, direction, design and technical production would rank well above par for the course in any country in the world. The fact that Australia can produce work of this kind is the strongest argument for the encouragement of our native talent. That it is not produced more often indicates how badly that encouragement, especially financial encouragement is needed." The reviewer added that:

Alistair Duncan's portrayal was brilliant. The opening, highly dramatic scenes of the play which Duncan shared with the beautiful Anne Haddy, created such excitement that the viewer readily forgave some later exaggerations... Miss Hooker's play is terribly weak on dialogue, but has enough dramatic design to have allowed director Henri Safran's imaginative cutting, clever atmospheric use of lighting and off beat camera-work to make this one of the best productions seen from one of our best producers.

The Sunday Telegraph said it was a "sensitive production... but the subject was formidably testing for living room audiences... its gloomy, unsavory theme probably chased most uncommitted viewers away after the first fifteen minutes."

Filmink called it "a superb script from Hooker... a dramatic and intelligent exploration of the relationship between two complex, compelling characters... it is a character piece rather than a plotty one, and some may find the pace too slow. The acting is very fine... and the sets and costumes are superb."

== Other productions ==
The play was performed on ABC radio in 1964. The radio play was the ABC's official entry into the 1964 Italia Prize Competition.

Hooker was meant to follow it with another play for the ABC, Winger Chariot about Socrates. It was not filmed for TV but was adapted for radio.

== Repeats ==
The play was repeated in Sydney and Melbourne on 24 March 1965.
29 April 1965 (Melbourne, repeat)

The play was later translated into Italian and French. It was turned into a stage play which was on at the Traverse Theatre in Edinburgh.

A search of their website suggests the National Archives may hold a copy, with running time listed as 1:16:22.
