= Dark Corridor =

- Wednesday Theatre episode
- Episode no.: Season 1 Episode 38
- Directed by: Alan Burke
- Teleplay by: Trevor Nielsen
- Original air date: 6 October 1965
- Running time: 40 mins

Guest appearance
- Betty Lucas

Episode chronology
← Previous "Macbeth"	Next → "Tartuffe"

"Dark Corridor" is a 1965 Australian TV play. It was an original play by Brisbane writer Trevor Nielsen.

It screened as part of Wednesday Theatre. Australian TV drama was relatively rare at the time.

== Plot ==
The action takes place at a roadside cafe along a South Australian high way. A married woman arrives, claiming she has lost her memory. Then her husband arrives, claiming she is faking amnesia and that his wife tried to kill him.

== Cast ==
- Betty Lucas
- Michael Thomas
- Judeth Duck

== Production ==
The production was shot in Adelaide.
