= Daphne Laureola =

1949 play by James Bridie

- Cover of first edition
- Original language: English
- Written by: James Bridie
- Genre: Comedy
- Setting: England

Premiere
- Date: 23 March 1949
- Place: Wyndham's Theatre

Daphne Laureola is a comic play by James Bridie about a young Polish refugee's infatuation with a middle-aged English woman. 'Egalitarianism is at the heart of this vision, but idealism may be just a liability.'

== Productions ==
The play was first produced by the Old Vic at Wyndham's Theatre in London in 1949, starring Edith Evans and Peter Finch, under the management of Laurence Olivier. The production was a major success, helping launch Finch's career in London. In August 1950, it was performed at the Theatre Royal in Glasgow.

A 1950 Broadway production, also starring Evans, was less successful.

== Original cast ==
- Maisie MacArthur - Anna Turner
- Bill Wishforth - Robin Lloyd
- Helen Willis - Eileen O'Hara
- Bob Kentish - Alexander Harris
- George, the Waiter at Le Tois aux Porcs - Martin Miller
- 1st Spiv - Billy Thatcher
- 2nd Spiv - John Tore
- Lady Pitts - Edith Evans
- Ernest Piaste - Peter Finch
- A Bored Woman - Anna Burden
- A Bored Man - Ireland Wood
- Mr. Gooch - Kenneth Hyde
- Mr. Watson - Mark Stone
- Vincent - Peter Williams
- Sir Joseph Pitts - Felix Aylmer
- The Manager of Le Toit aux Porcs - Bernard Gillman

== Adaptations ==
It was adapted for television in the UK in 1958, In West Germany in 1962, in Australia in 1965 and in the UK again in 1978, starring Olivier and Joan Plowright, Olivier's wife, as Lady Pitts.
