= Ray Lawler =

Australian playwright (1921–2024)

Ray Lawler AO OBE
- Born: Raymond Evenor Lawler; 23 May 1921; Footscray, Melbourne, Victoria, Australia
- Died: 24 July 2024 (aged 103); Melbourne, Australia
- Occupations: Playwright; dramatist; actor; director; producer
- Spouse: Jacklyn Kelleher (m. 1956)
- Children: 3
- Writing career
- Notable work: Summer of the Seventeenth Doll; (1953)

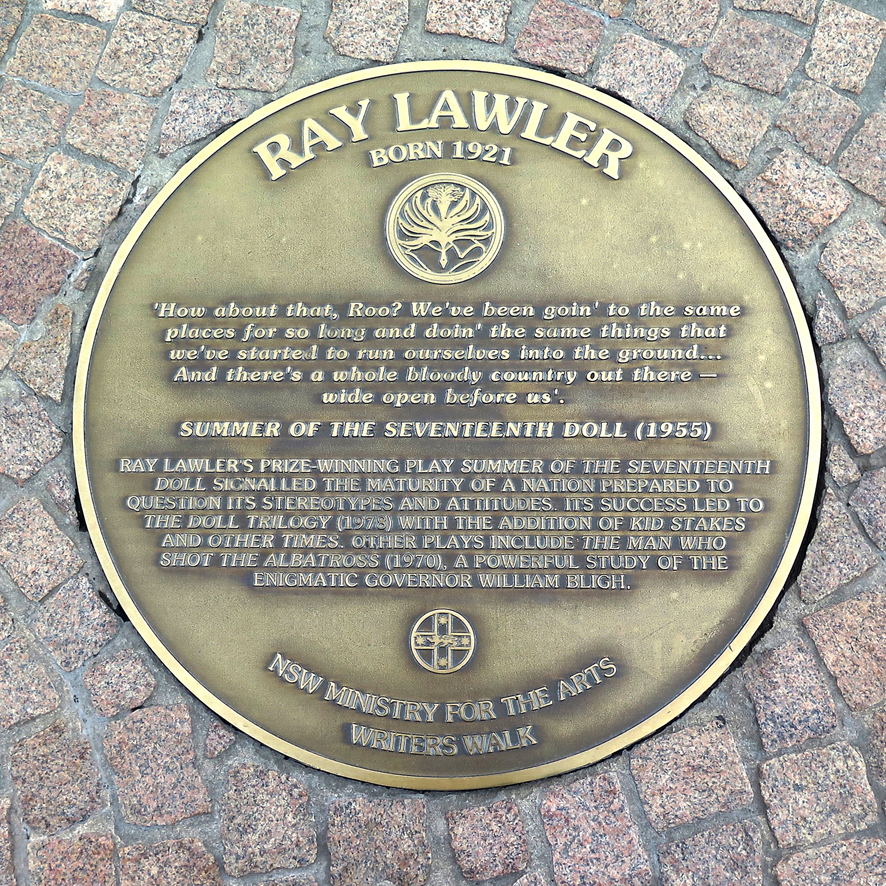
A metal plaque set in the sidewalk at Circular Quay in Sydney commemorating author Ray Lawler as part of the Sydney Writers Walk.

Raymond Evenor Lawler AO OBE (23 May 1921 – 24 July 2024) was an Australian playwright and dramatist, actor, theatre producer and director.

Lawler's most notable play was his tenth, Summer of the Seventeenth Doll (1953), which had its premiere in Melbourne in 1955. The play was notable for changing the direction of Australian drama. Considered one of the greatest Australian plays of the 20th century, it was adapted to a film in 1959, starring Angela Lansbury and Ernest Borgnine. The story of The Doll is preceded by Kid's Stakes, set in 1937, when the characters of The Doll are young adults, and then Other Times, which is set in 1945 and includes most of the same characters.

== Early life ==
Lawler was born in the Melbourne suburb of Footscray on 23 May 1921, second of eight children of a council worker. He left school at 13 to work in a factory and attended evening acting classes. He wrote his first play at 19, and his play Hal's Belles had good notices in early 1946. It was described as "...easy to stage and is a slick, finished work", then being offered by J. and N. Tait in London and New York.

== Career ==
He first attracted attention as a writer in 1952 when his play Cradle of Thunder was presented by the National Theatre Competition. In 1955, Summer of the Seventeenth Doll gained first prize in the Playwright Advisory Board Competition with Oriel Gray’s The Torrents and was subsequently presented by the Union Theatre. Lawler played the role of Barney at the premiere of Summer of the Seventeenth Doll in 1955. The play was taken up by the Australian Elizabethan Theatre Trust and presented in all Australian states as well as London and New York. It won the Evening Standard Award for the best new play on the London stage in 1957. Since then it has been translated into many languages and performed in many countries. It was also filmed in 1959.

Lawler went to London with the cast and lived in Denmark, England, and Ireland. Summer of the Seventeenth Doll was followed by The Piccadilly Bushman (1959), presented in Australia by J. C. Williamson’s and published by Angus & Robertson (1961); The Unshaven Cheek, presented at the 1963 Edinburgh International Festival; and A Breach in the Wall, about St Thomas Becket (televised in 1967, produced at Canterbury in 1970).

In 1969, he adapted and dramatised the short story "Before the Party" by Somerset Maugham, for a television series, which was produced by Verity Lambert. A second 13-part series was aired in 1970.

In 1972, he visited Australia for the Melbourne Theatre Company’s production of The Man Who Shot the Albatross, a version of the Governor Bligh story.

In 1975, Lawler returned to settle in Australia as associate director of the Melbourne Theatre Company, with an agreement to complete a trilogy based on Summer of the Seventeenth Doll. The first play, Kid's Stakes, opened in December 1975 and the second, Other Times, in December 1976. The Doll Trilogy had its first full performance at the Russell Street Theatre, Melbourne, on 12 February 1977.

== Personal life and death ==
Lawler married Jacklyn Kelleher, an actress, in 1956. They had twin sons, Adam and Martin, born in London in May 1957, and subsequently a daughter, Kylie. He turned 100 in May 2021 and died in Melbourne on 24 July 2024, at the age of 103.

== Honours and legacy ==
Lawler was appointed an Officer of the Order of the British Empire (OBE) in the 1981 New Year Honours for services to the performing arts. He was appointed Officer of the Order of Australia (AO) in the 2022 Queen's Birthday Honours "for distinguished service to the performing arts as an actor, playwright and director."

The smaller theatre space, the Lawler, in the Melbourne Theatre Company's Southbank Theatre is named after him.

== Works ==
=== Stage ===
- Cradle of Thunder (1949)
- The Bluff and the Fair (1952 – a reworked version of Hal's Belles, 1945)
- The Adventures of Ginger Meggs (1952, children's musical)
- Tram Stop 10! (1954, co-writer of revue)
- Summer of the Seventeenth Doll (1955)
- Return Fare (1955, co-writer of revue)
- The Piccadilly Bushman (1959)
- The Unshaven Cheek (1963)
- A Breach in the Wall (1970)
- The Man Who Shot the Albatross (1971)
- Kid Stakes (1975)
- Other Times (1976)
- Godsend (1982)
