= Flight into Danger =

1956 television film by Gabriel Axel

- Promotional poster
- Written by: Arthur Hailey
- Directed by: David Greene
- Starring: James Doohan; Corinne Conley; Cec Linder
- Country of origin: Canada
- Original language: English

Production
- Producer: Sydney Newman
- Running time: 60 minutes
- Production company: Canadian Broadcasting Corporation (CBC)
- Budget: $18,000 (Canadian)

Original release
- Network: CBC Television
- Release: April 3, 1956

Flight into Danger is a 1956 Canadian live television play starring James Doohan, Corinne Conley and Cec Linder. It was written by Arthur Hailey, produced and screened by CBC Television, and broadcast on April 3, 1956, on the General Motors Theatre series. It was later adapted into two different feature films, a parody feature film, a novel, and international television versions in the United States, the United Kingdom, Germany, and Australia.

== Plot ==
While on a flight from Toronto, Ontario, to Vancouver, British Columbia, the pilots at the controls of a Canadair North Star, a large commercial airliner, fall victim to food poisoning. Approximately half of the passengers have also been incapacitated by eating the same fish served to the pilots. After the stewardess (Corinne Conley) asks for help from the passengers, George Spencer (James Doohan), an ex-Second World War Spitfire fighter pilot, is forced to take over, with the stewardess's assistance.

== Cast ==
- James Doohan as George Spencer (Note: Doohan was a wartime pilot flying Taylorcraft Auster Mark V aircraft for 666 (AOP) Squadron, RCAF as a Royal Canadian Artillery officer.)
- Corinne Conley as Janet
- Cec Linder as Martin Treleaven
- Sandy Webster as Dr. Frank Baird

== Production ==
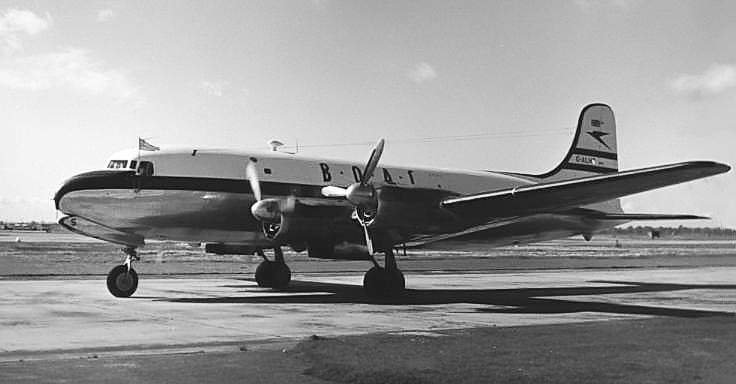
The Canadair North Star was a derivation of the Douglas DC-4 airliner and was a common sight in North America in the 1950s.

Playwright Hailey, a former British pilot in the Second World War, emigrated to Canada in 1947. He began working as a sales promotion manager for a tractor-trailer manufacturer in Toronto. On a flight between Vancouver and Toronto in 1955, he came up with the original idea that spawned Flight into Danger. The story of an airliner whose passengers and crew were threatened by an unforeseen event such as food poisoning was written in only nine days and shopped about as a screenplay. The Canadian Broadcasting Corporation, whose television service was less than four years old, bought the script for $600.

The production acquired the cockpit of a Royal Canadian Air Force Canadair North Star and had it transported by road to the CBC studios in Toronto from RCAF Station Trenton, where the filming for aerial shots took place. The Malton Airport at Malton, Ontario, present day Toronto Pearson International Airport, was also used for some exterior scenes of planes.

== Reception ==
When Flight into Danger was broadcast live-to-air on April 3, 1956, on the network's General Motors Theatre, and received a resounding positive reaction. "In the words of one journalist, it was 'probably the most successful TV play ever written anywhere'." A kinescope of the live production was broadcast in August 1956 due to viewer demand. The play was remade with a new cast and production staff on NBC's anthology series The Alcoa Hour on September 16, 1956, and later the same month the original CBC version was shown by the BBC in the United Kingdom and was a major factor in the supervising producer of CBC's television dramas, Sydney Newman, being brought across to work in the UK. There he made a significant impact on the British television drama industry.

In 1957, Flight into Danger was adapted into the feature film Zero Hour! and, in 1962, the story was adapted for an episode of the BBC series Studio 4. In 1964, a German version of the television film was produced under the title Flug in Gefahr. Czechoslovak radio (Československý rozhlas) has produced it as part of the radio series Let do nebezpečí, directed by Jiří Horčička. An Australian television version was produced in 1966.

In Flight into Danger, Hailey created the template for future disaster films. Hailey's story was adapted as a novel by John Castle (a pseudonym for Ronald Payne and John Garrod), with Hailey receiving credit as co-author. The book was called Flight into Danger for its British publication by Souvenir Press in 1958, but retitled Runway Zero-Eight for its American publication by Doubleday in 1959. The story was again produced for American television in 1971 as Terror in the Sky, a Movie of the Week, and more famously parodied in the 1980 comedy feature film Airplane!.
