= Zero Hour! =

1957 American drama film directed by Hall Bartlett

- Theatrical poster
- Directed by: Hall Bartlett
- Screenplay by: Arthur Hailey; Hall Bartlett; John Champion
- Based on: Flight into Danger; 1956 teleplay on General Motors Theatre by Arthur Hailey
- Produced by: John C. Champion; Hall Bartlett
- Starring: Dana Andrews; Linda Darnell; Sterling Hayden
- Narrated by: William Conrad
- Cinematography: John F. Warren
- Edited by: John C. Fuller
- Music by: Ted Dale; Arthur Hamilton
- Production company: Paramount Pictures
- Distributed by: Paramount Pictures
- Release date: November 13, 1957
- Running time: 81 minutes
- Country: United States
- Language: English
- Budget: $400,764. or $650,000

Zero Hour! is a 1957 American disaster film directed by Hall Bartlett from a screenplay by Bartlett, Arthur Hailey, and John Champion. It stars Dana Andrews, Linda Darnell, and Sterling Hayden and features Peggy King, Elroy "Crazy Legs" Hirsch, Geoffrey Toone, and Jerry Paris in supporting roles. It was released by Paramount Pictures.

Zero Hour! was a remake of the Canadian television play Flight into Danger, and was the basis for the 1980 parody film Airplane!.

== Plot ==
During the closing days of the Second World War, six members of the Royal Air Force fighter squadron led by Canadian pilot Ted Stryker are killed because of a command decision he made. Stryker blamed himself for that bad decision, falling into a deep sense of depression and anxiety which impeded his will to fly again. Years later, in civilian life in Winnipeg, Manitoba, a guilt-stricken Stryker goes through many jobs, and his marriage is in trouble.

Stryker finds a note at home: His wife Ellen has taken their young son Joey and is leaving him, flying to Vancouver. He rushes to Winnipeg Airport to board the same flight, Cross-Canada Air Lines Flight 714, operated by a Douglas DC-4. He asks his wife for one last chance, but Ellen says that she can no longer love a man she does not respect.

Stewardess Janet Turner begins the meal service, offering meat (lamb chops) or fish (grilled halibut) as the choices. When a number of passengers and the co-pilot begin feeling sick, a doctor aboard determines that the fish is the cause. The pilot also becomes seriously ill and cannot fly the airplane. Before he passes out, he turns on the autopilot.

The stewardess determines that Stryker is the only passenger with flying experience, but he has not flown in 10 years and has never piloted an aircraft of this size. Owing to dense fog, Flight 714 cannot land at Calgary or any other airport east of the Canadian Rockies but must continue to Vancouver.

Stryker's superior officer in the war, the tough-minded Captain Treleaven, is summoned to Vancouver Airport. Treleaven blames Stryker for the wartime deaths and has no faith in him. He has no choice but to work with him, though, getting him familiarized with the airplane and teaching him how to land. Ellen joins her husband in the cockpit to handle the radio.

As they approach Vancouver, it is shrouded in fog. Treleaven orders him to circle, for hours if necessary, in the hope that it will lift, but Stryker decides to try to land immediately because passengers will die if they do not get medical treatment soon. Stryker makes a rough landing, but no passengers are injured. He has conquered his demons and regained the respect of both Ellen and Captain Treleaven.

== Cast ==
- Dana Andrews as Ted Stryker
- Linda Darnell as Ellen Stryker
- Sterling Hayden as Captain Martin Treleaven
- Elroy "Crazylegs" Hirsch as Captain Bill Wilson
- Geoffrey Toone as Dr. Baird
- Jerry Paris as Tony Decker
- Peggy King as Stewardess Janet Turner
- Charles Quinlivan as Harry Burdick

== Production ==
=== Writing ===
Zero Hour! was an adaptation of Hailey's original 1956 Canadian Broadcasting Corporation teleplay Flight into Danger, starring James Doohan as George Spencer, the original name for the Stryker character. Hailey also co-wrote a novel with John Castle based on the same plot, titled Flight Into Danger in most countries but Runway Zero-Eight in the US (1958), although this is based more closely on the television version than on the film.

=== Filming ===
Principal photography took place from May 8–28, 1957, with retakes on July 23–24, 1957. The primary filming location was Santa Ana, California. Nightclub and television performer Peggy King made her feature film debut in Zero Hour!, recording the song "Zero Hour" for Columbia Records to coincide with the film's release. (Note: At the time, the Los Angeles Times reported that Harrison Reeder of Robert Alexander Productions attempted to purchase the screen rights to the Zero Hour story as a star vehicle for actor Steve Cochran.)

John Ashley has a small role appearing on television as a pop star, although the vocals were provided by Duke Mitchell.

Geoffrey Toone, who appears here as Dr Baird, had played Treleaven in the NBC network's American remake of the original television play.

== Reception ==
The New York Times reviewer Bosley Crowther called Zero Hour! an "exciting contemplation of a frightening adventure in the skies" based on a "good terse script ... Dana Andrews as the hero and Sterling Hayden as the captain are first-rate in these roles, keeping them hard and unrelenting." Time, however, called the script a "bloopy inflation of a 1956 television show" and said its "moral struggle comes off fairly well, but the general situation is as patently contrived as one of Walter Mitty's daydreams."

In 1971, the film was remade as a made-for-television movie, Terror in the Sky, a Movie of the Week special with Doug McClure in the Ted Stryker role (renamed George Spencer, as in the original).

Screenplay writer Hailey went on to write the popular 1968 novel Airport, which revisited the air disaster genre and led to a film franchise that was also spoofed by Airplane! and its own sequel.

== Airplane! ==
Zero Hour! was used as the basis for the parody film Airplane! (1980). Co-director Jerry Zucker described it as a "perfectly classically structured film." As the Airplane! script adheres closely to the dialog and plot of Zero Hour!, Zucker and his co-directors Jim Abrahams and David Zucker obtained the official remake rights to Zero Hour! for $2,500.

== See also ==
- List of American films of 1957

== Bibliography ==
- Pendo, Stephen. Aviation in the Cinema. Lanham, Maryland: Scarecrow Press, 1985. ISBN 0-8-1081-746-2.
