= Henri Safran =

French-born Australian film director (born 1932)

Henri Safran (born 7 October 1932) is a Paris-born director who worked extensively in Australia. He worked in French television, then in Britain, before moving to Australia in 1960 to work with the ABC. He became an Australian citizen in 1963 but returned to England in 1966 to work on British television. He returned to Australia again in the mid-1970s.

== Select credits ==
- Traveller Without Luggage (1961)
- Jenny (1962) (TV movie)
- A Season in Hell (1964) (TV movie)
- A Sound of Trumpets (1964) (TV movie)
- The Swagman (1965) (TV play)
- The Sweet Sad Story of Elmo and Me (1965) (TV play)
- Tartuffe (1965) (TV play)
- Write Me a Murder (1965) (TV play)
- The Tape Recorder (1966) (TV play)
- The Air-Conditioned Author (1966) (TV play)
- Done Away with It (1966) (TV play)
- Storm Boy (1976)
- Listen to the Lion (1977)
- Golden Soak (1979) (mini-series)
- Norman Loves Rose (1982)
- Bush Christmas (1983)
- The Edge of Power (1987)
- The Rogue Stallion (1990)
- Flair (1990) (mini-series)
