= Terror in the Sky =

- Based on: Flight into Danger by Arthur Hailey
- Written by: Elinor Karpf
- Directed by: Bernard L. Kowalski
- Starring: Doug McClure; Leif Erickson; Lois Nettleton; Roddy McDowall
- Music by: Pat Williams
- Country of origin: United States
- Original language: English

Production
- Running time: 74 minutes

Original release
- Network: CBS
- Release: September 17, 1971

Terror in the Sky is a 1971 television film remake of the 1956 television play Flight into Danger by Arthur Hailey. The film stars Doug McClure, Lois Nettleton, Roddy McDowall, Leif Erickson, Kenneth Tobey, and Keenan Wynn. Terror in the Sky originally aired on September 17, 1971 on CBS.

== Plot ==
Passengers on a plane headed from the Midwest to the West Coast (Winnipeg to Vancouver in the original; Minneapolis to Seattle in the film) get quite ill after eating the chicken pot pie entree. Both pilots also eat the chicken. Passenger George Spencer, a man who has not flown since the Vietnam War (single-engine planes in the original, helicopter/war choppers in the film), is reluctantly pressed into flying the plane, where he makes an emergency landing.

== Cast ==
- Doug McClure - George Spencer
- Leif Erickson - Marty Treleavan
- Roddy McDowall - Dr. Baird
- Lois Nettleton - Janet Turner
- Keenan Wynn - Milton
- Kenneth Tobey - Captain Wilson
- Jack Ging - Controller
- Sam Melville - Stewart
- Leonard Stone - Harry Burdick
