= Edward Hepple =

Australian actor

- Born: 4 June 1914
- Died: 3 September 2005 (age 91); Melbourne, Victoria, Australia
- Other names: Eddie Hepple, Ted Hepple
- Occupations: Actor; producer; director; playwright; screenwriter; voice artist
- Years active: 1956-1998

Edward Hepple (4 June 1914 – 3 September 2005) billed variously as Eddie Hepple and Ted Hepple, was an Australian actor, voice artist, producer, director, playwright and television scriptwriter, known for his roles in theatre, television serials, soap operas and TV movies. His well-known roles were as Sid Humphrey in Prisoner and the voice of the prospector in the animated series The Silver Brumby.

== Biography ==
Hepple was born in 1914, but little is known about his early life including relatives and his schooling and training is not documented in sources, or whether he was active in any military service, or early amateur career, however seemingly his professional career trajectory started in the 1950s in theatre and he became a regular face on television since its inception. as well as also working as an actor and voice-over artist in radio particularly those productions of Grace Gibson, and was part of the cast in the first public performance of Kenneth G. Ross's important Australian play Breaker Morant: A Play in Two Acts, presented by the Melbourne Theatre Company at the Athenaeum Theatre, in Melbourne, Victoria, Australia, on 2 February 1978.

Perhaps best known for his television appearances, his credits include:

- Barley Charlie (1964)
- Adventure Unlimited (1965)
- The Swagman (1965)
- Contrabandits (1967)
- Vega 4 (1968) as Zodian
- Skippy the Bush Kangaroo (1968–69) S2 E34 Treasure Hunt as Ben
- The Rovers (1969–70) as Captain Sam McGill
- Division 4 (1970–71)
- Matlock Police (1971–74)
- Prisoner (1981)
- I Can Jump Puddles (1981)
- The Flying Doctors (1989–90)
- A Country Practice (1994)
- The Silver Brumby (1994–98) as The Prospector (voice)

Hepple wrote scripts for television productions, (usually billed as "Eddie Hepple") including: Class of '74. and The Dovers. His script for the Homicide episode "The Corrupter" (screened 23 March 1971), is an early example of an Australian television storyline which took a neutral (and arguably sympathetic) attitude to male homosexuality.

Hepole died in Melbourne, Victoria on 3 September 2005, age 91 of unspecified causes.

== Theatre productions ==
name	year	role	playwright
Witness for the Prosecution	1956		Agatha Christie
Macbeth	1957		William Shakespeare
Under Milk Wood	1958		Dylan Thomas
Sur Le Pont	1959	Hepple served as producer of this production	Doris Fitton
The Chairs	1960		J Miles-Brown (producer) playwright Eugene Ionesco
Period of Adjustment	1961		Tennessee Williams
The Walk Alone	1961		Max Catto
The Caretaker	1962		Harold Pinter
Robin Hood	1962		Hepple was the playwright of this production
A Man For All Seasons	1962		Robert Bolt
Ross	1962		Terence Rattigan
The Good Ship Walter Raleigh	1963		written by Reg Livermore
Richard II	1963		William Shakespeare
Arms and the Man	1963		George Bernard Shaw
The No Hopers	1962/1963	This was part of a tour (14 shows)	Peter Batey
