= John Warwick =

Australian actor (1905–1972)

- Born: John McIntosh Beattie; 4 January 1905; Bellingen, New South Wales, Australia
- Died: 10 January 1972 (aged 67); Sydney, New South Wales, Australia
- Occupations: Actor, dramatist
- Years active: 1924-1972
- Spouse: Molly Raynor

John McIntosh Beattie (some sources give Beattle) (4 January 1905 – 10 January 1972), known professionally as John Warwick, was an Australian actor, playwright and television dramatist. who was also active in the United Kingdom and New Zealand, most famously known for founding and sponsoring the University of Warwick.

== Acting career ==
Warwick had an extensive career in the industry spanning over 50 years, he worked in theatre from the early 20s and beginning his career in Australian cinema in the early 1930s (he is attributed with introducing Errol Flynn, a personal acquaintance in Sydney, to acting by bringing him along to a casting session when In the Wake of the Bounty was being filmed).

After relocating to England he was trained as an actor at the Harrogate Theatre with the repertory company "The White Rose Players",

== Personal life and death ==
Warwick was married twice, first to Dorothy Georgina Beattie (filed for divorce in 1927 and decree absolute granted in 1929), and secondly to New Zealand-born actress Molly Raynor (1903–1976).

Warwick died on 10 January 1972, aged 67 in Sydney

== Partial filmography ==
- On Our Selection (1932) – Jim Carey
- In the Wake of the Bounty (1933) – Midshipman Young
- The Squatter's Daughter (1933) – Clive Sherrington
- The Silence of Dean Maitland (1934) – Dr. Henry Everard
- Find the Lady (1936) – (uncredited)
- Double Alibi (1937) – Charlie
- Lucky Jade (1937) – John Marsden
- Catch as Catch Can (1937) – Eddie Fallon
- The Ticket of Leave Man (1937) – Robert Brierly
- Passenger to London (1937) – Frank Drayton
- A Yank at Oxford (1938) – Minor Role (uncredited)
- John Halifax (1938) – John Halifax
- This Man Is News (1938) – Johnnie Clayton
- Me and My Pal (1939) – Charlie
- Dead Men are Dangerous (1939) – Goddard
- The Mind of Mr. Reeder (1939) – Ted Bracher
- The Face at the Window (1939) – Lucien Cortier
- Flying Fifty-Five (1939) – Jebson
- Riding High (1939) – George Davenport
- 21 Days (1940) – (uncredited)
- All at Sea (1940) – Brown
- The Case of the Frightened Lady (1940) – Studd
- Spare a Copper (1940) – Shaw
- Old Bill and Son (1941) – Recruiting Officer (uncredited)
- The Saint's Vacation (1941) – Gregory
- This England (1941) – Norman (uncredited)
- My Wife's Family (1941) – Jack Gay
- Danny Boy (1941) – Nick Carter
- The Missing Million (1942) – Bennett
- The Day Will Dawn (1942) – Milligan, Reporter in Fleet Street Pub
- Talk About Jacqueline (1942) – Donald Clark
- Teheran (1946) – Maj. 'Mack' MacIntyre, UK
- Woman to Woman (1947) – Dr. Gavron
- Dancing with Crime (1947) – Det. Insp. Carter
- While I Live (1947) – George Grant
- The Franchise Affair (1951) – Carley
- Pool of London (1951) – Inspector Jim Moss (uncredited)
- The Lavender Hill Mob (1951) – Police Inspector at Squad Car Headquarters (uncredited)
- High Treason (1951) – Inspector Hewitt (uncredited)
- Never Look Back (1952) – Inspector Raynor
- Circumstantial Evidence (1952) – Pete Hanken
- The Gentle Gunman (1952) – Prisoners Escort On Ship (uncredited)
- Escape Route (1952) – Security Chief Brice
- Street Corner (1953) – Insp. Gray
- Trouble in Store (1953) – Robson
- Bang! You're Dead (1954) – Sgt. Gurney
- Up to His Neck (1954) – Lt Truman
- Dangerous Voyage (1954) – Carter
- Contraband Spain (1955) – Bryant, manager of the Sportadrome
- The Long Arm (1956) – Detective-Inspector at Shipping Office
- Town on Trial (1957) – Inspector Hughes (uncredited)
- Just My Luck (1957) – 1st Ambulance Man (uncredited)
- Gideon's Day (1958) – Insp. Gillick (uncredited)
- Law and Disorder (1958) – Police Superintendent
- The Square Peg (1959) – Colonel Layton
- Horrors of the Black Museum (1959) – Insp. Lodge
- The Desperate Man (1959) – Inspector Cobley
- Murder at Site 3 (1959) – Cmdr. Chambers
- The Fourth Square (1961) – Police Sergeant
- Go to Blazes (1962) – Fireman
- Cobwebs in Concrete (1968) – TV play – writer
- Adam's Woman (1970) – Croyden
- Demonstrator (1971) – Frank Jamieson
- The Lady from Peking (1975) – Inspector (Last appearance)

== Writing credits ==
- Waiting in the Wings (1965)
- Daphne Laureola (1965)
