= Patrick Barton =

Patrick Barton is an Australian TV director best known for his productions in the 1960s.

== Select credits ==
- You Can't Win 'Em All (1962)
- The Gioconda Smile (1963)
- Night Stop (1963)
- Double Yolk (1963)
- The Angry General (1964)
- The Sponge Room (1964)
- The Road (1964)
- Wind from the Icy Country (1964)
- A Provincial Lady (1964)
- Dangerous Corner (1965)
- A Time to Speak (1965)
- Cross of Gold (1965)
- Othello (1964)
- Daphne Laureola (1965)
- Romanoff and Juliet (1965)
- Ashes to Ashes (1966)
- Waiting in the Wings (1965)
- Should the Woman Pay? (1966)
- Antigone (1966)
- Goodbye, Gloria, Hello! (1967)
- Love and War (1967) - "Man of Destiny"
- Quality of Mercy (1975)
- Bellbird (TV series)
