= Out of the Darkness (radio serial) =

Out of the Darkness is a 1942 Australian radio serial by Eric Scott for the George Edwards Company.

The serial was very popular. It was produced again in 1946, 1949, 1950, 1951 and 1952.

== Premise ==
Scientist Jan Walders brings creatures back to life.

== Cast ==
- George Edwards as Jan Walders
- Nell Stirling
- Queenie Ashton
