= Eric Scott (writer) =

Australian writer, actor (1910–1971)

Eric Scott (1910–1971) was an Australian writer, actor and director best known for his work in radio. He was one of the key writers for producer/actor George Edwards along with Maurice Francis, Lorna Bingham and Sumner Locke Elliott.

== Select credits ==
- The Phantom Drummer (1941)
- Passport to Danger (1942)
- Dr Jekyll and Mr Hyde (1944)
- Owen Foster and the Devil (1945)
- These Old Shades (1947)
- This Happened to Me (1948)
- Out of the Darkness (1950)
- Two Lives Have I (1950)
- Mystery Stable (1952)
- The Man in the Iron Mask (1952)
- Apple Trees (1952)
- Angel's Flight (1954)
