= Lewisham Sewage Aqueduct =

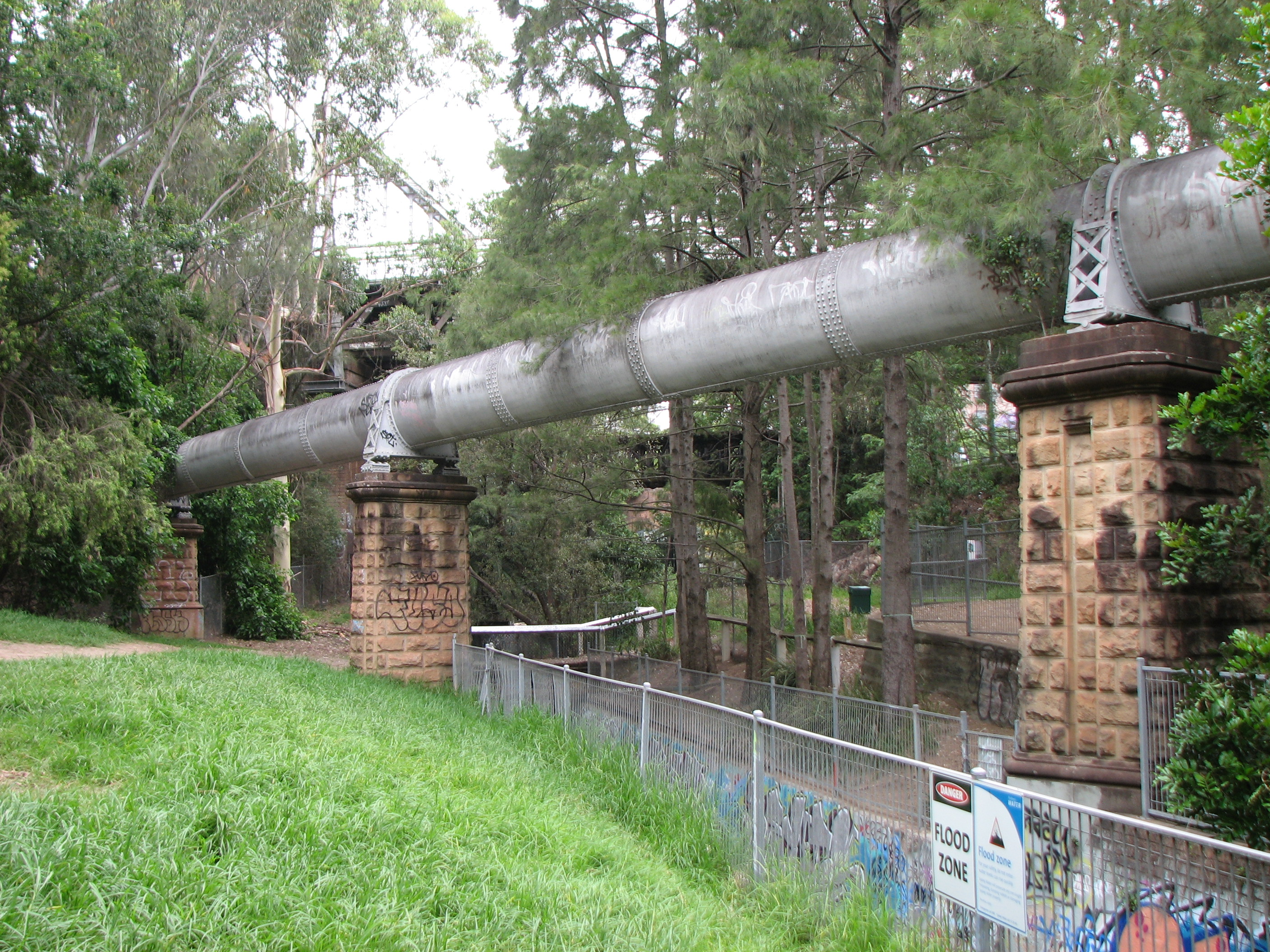

- Location within Sydney
- 33.8916°S 151.1445°E
- Location: Grosvenor Crescent, Summer Hill, Inner West Council, Sydney, New South Wales, Australia

History
- Built: 1900

Site notes
- Architect(s): Sewerage Construction Branch; Department of Public Works
- Owner: Sydney Water

New South Wales Heritage Register
- Official name: Lewisham Sewage Aqueduct
- Type: state heritage (built)
- Designated: 18 November 1999
- Reference no.: 1326
- Type: Sewage Aqueduct
- Category: Utilities - Sewerage
- Builders: Sewerage Construction Branch, Department of Public Works

Lewisham Sewage Aqueduct is a heritage-listed sewage aqueduct in Gadigal Reserve, adjacent to 5 Grosvenor Crescent, Summer Hill, Inner West Council, Sydney, New South Wales, Australia. It was designed by Sewerage Construction Branch and Department of Public Works and built in 1900. The property is owned by Sydney Water. It was added to the New South Wales State Heritage Register on 18 November 1999.

== History ==
The Lewisham sewage aqueduct was completed in 1900. The aqueduct was constructed for the Dobroyd Branch of the Southern and Western Suburbs Ocean Outfall Sewer. The aqueduct was designed and built by the Sewerage Branch of the Public Works Department. The design work was completed by March 1897. The engineer-in-chief of this department was Joseph Davis.

The Dobroyd Branch is a sub-branch of the Main Northern Branch of SWSOOS, which services the areas of Marrickville, Petersham, Ashfield, Burwood, Drummoyne, Strathfield, Concord and Homebush. The Dobroyd Branch contract extended from the junction of The Boulevard/Hunter Street, Lewisham northwest to the Parramatta Road.

The aqueduct carries sewage from Dobroyd Point, Haberfield and parts of Ashfield. Part of this contract was let during 1897. By mid-1898 the piers for the aqueduct had been erected and the steel plates delivered. The Branch was completed by mid 1900 and transferred to the Water Board. The aqueduct was designed to carry sewage over Long Cove Creek stormwater channel near the Lewisham railway viaduct.

The design provided for an aqueduct 85-metre long (280 ft) with six spans (two spans of 12 metres (40 ft)) and four spans of 15 metres (50 ft)). The sewer carrier is an oviform steel plate pipe 1.4 metres (4.5 ft) by 1.1 metres (3.5 ft) supported on mass concrete piers faced in worked sandstone blocks. The dimension of these piers varies. The tallest is approximately 7.3 metres (24 ft) with a base 3.2 metres (10.5 ft) by 1.8 metres (6 ft). The steel carrier rests on two fixed rocker supports on the central pier with sliding rocker supports on the other four piers and at the abutments. The abutments were designed as stone faced. Within the embankment are a series (four each side) of mass concrete arches of approximately 2.4-metre (8 ft) span.

The contract drawings also indicate the carrier elsewhere within the embankment is concrete encased. The use of an oviform section for the carrier is to maintain a self cleansing velocity at low flows. Whilst common in sewer construction, it is not considered to be a requirement for metal carriers. The Lewisham Sewage Aqueduct (1900) is one of six sewage aqueducts in Sydney completed in the period 1895–1901. Others include the reinforced concrete "Monier" arches at Whites Creek and Johnstons Creek (White's Creek Aqueduct, 1897), the mass concrete/brick arches and iron pipe at Wolli Creek and Cooks River (Wolli Creek Aqueduct, 1895), and the Mosman Bay steel arch (1901).

== Description ==
The Lewisham sewage aqueduct comprises two principal elements - the metal oviform carrier, supported on concrete piers faced in sandstone rusticated blocks, with worked decorative bases and capitals. The carrier sections (the Public Works reports consistently give the material as steel) are riveted. The carrier is connected to the pier by two rocker plates and metal lattice supports. All of this appears original. The east and west ends of the carrier terminate within an abutment faced in worked sandstone. The Lewisham sewage aqueduct is situated within a wide, shallow valley north of the main western railway line, which is similarly carried over the valley by embankment and viaduct. Between Piers 2 and 3 of the aqueduct is a brick and concrete rendered stormwater channel (c.1899). These three elements of late nineteenth and early twentieth century public infrastructure in close proximity evoke an interesting industrial archaeological scene. The sewer carrier continues to serve as an integral link in the sewerage of the local area and is part of SWOOS.

== Heritage listing ==
The Lewisham sewage aqueduct, completed in 1900, is a key and highly visible component of the Southern and Western Suburbs Ocean Outfall Sewer system. The extension of this system into Dobroyd Point provided for a sewerage service to the emerging suburbs of Haberfield and Ashfield. The aqueduct is considered unique in Australia for its riveted oviform steel carrier. The functional nature of the carrier is embellished by decorative metal lattice work, and worked sandstone faced piers and abutments. The setting of the aqueduct adjacent the stormwater channel and railway embankment/viaduct make a precinct of high historic and industrial archaeological interest. Elements of significance are the past and ongoing use, technologies of construction, and setting within the shallow valley.

Lewisham Sewage Aqueduct was listed on the New South Wales State Heritage Register on 18 November 1999 having satisfied the following criteria.

The place is important in demonstrating the course, or pattern, of cultural or natural history in New South Wales.

The Lewisham sewer aqueduct, completed in 1900, is a key and highly visible component of the Southern and Western Suburbs Ocean Outfall Sewer system. The extension of this system into Dobroyd Point provided for a sewerage service to the emerging suburbs of Haberfield and Ashfield, both of which experienced marked development during the 1900s to 1920s.

The place is important in demonstrating aesthetic characteristics and/or a high degree of creative or technical achievement in New South Wales.

The functional nature of the carrier is embellished by decorative metal lattice work, and worked sandstone faced piers and abutments. The setting of the aqueduct adjacent the stormwater channel and railway embankment/viaduct make a precinct of high aesthetic note.

The place has strong or special association with a particular community or cultural group in New South Wales for social, cultural or spiritual reasons.

The aqueduct is a major element of the historic built environment of the local area, which due to its location adjacent the railway line is likely to be known to some of the Sydney community.

The place has potential to yield information that will contribute to an understanding of the cultural or natural history of New South Wales.

The aqueduct is considered unique in Australia for its riveted oviform steel carrier

The place possesses uncommon, rare or endangered aspects of the cultural or natural history of New South Wales.

Rare in Australia in consideration of the extent and date of the steel carrier.

The place is important in demonstrating the principal characteristics of a class of cultural or natural places/environments in New South Wales.

Representative in its function which is widespread across Sydney.

== Gallery ==
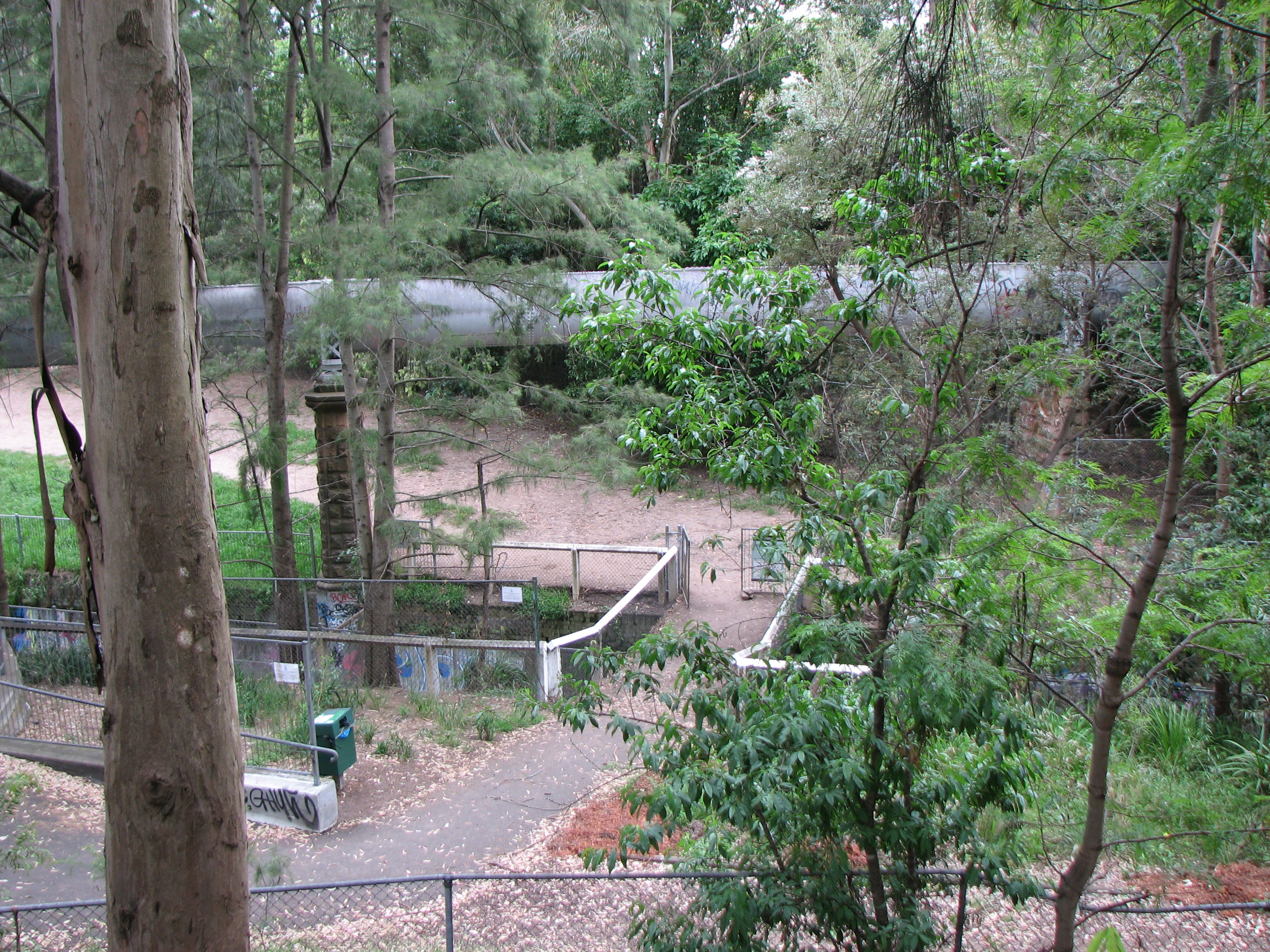
Lewisham sewage aqueduct at the point it crosses the Long Cove Creek stormwater channel

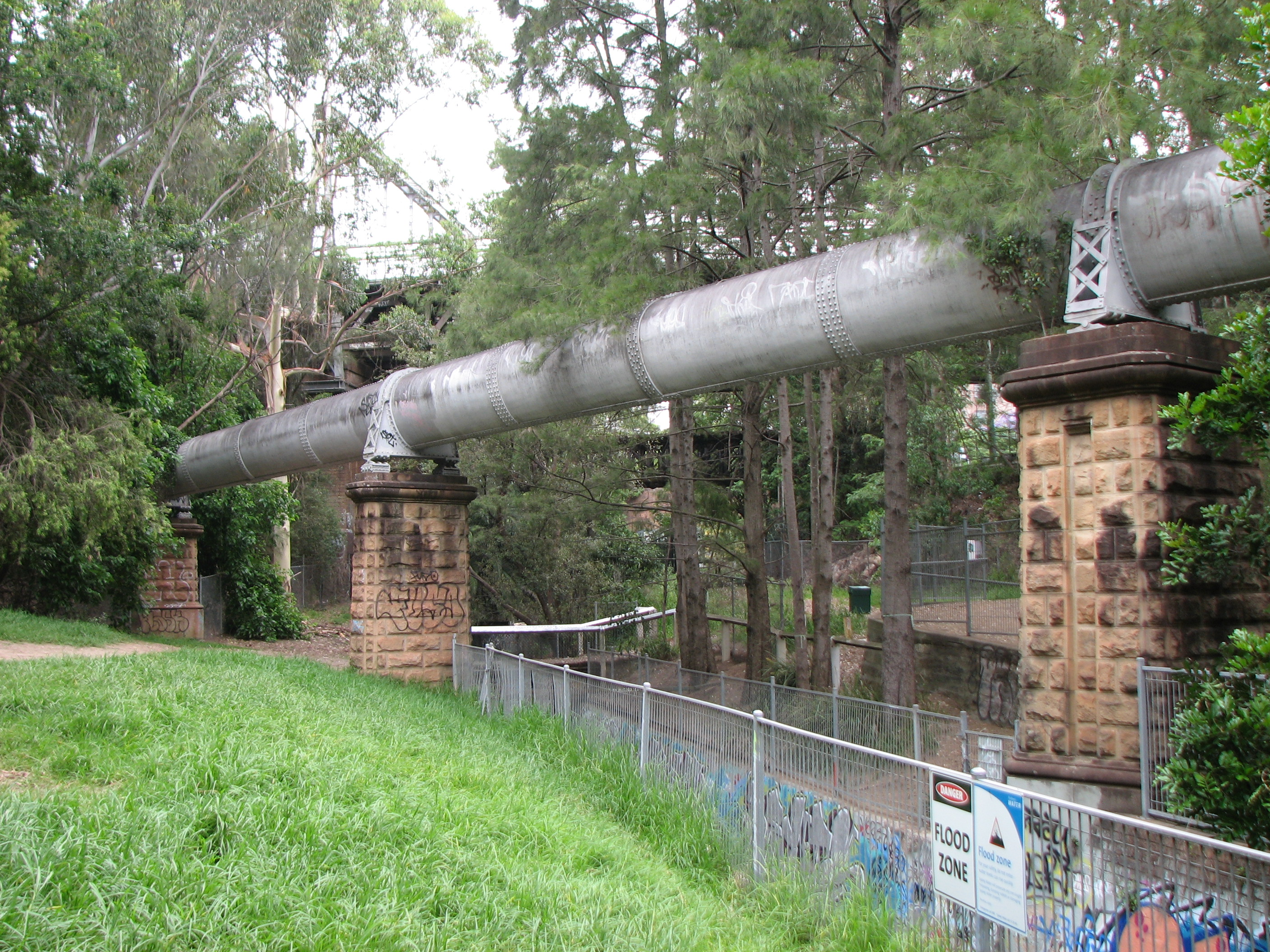
Part of the Lewisham sewage aqueduct

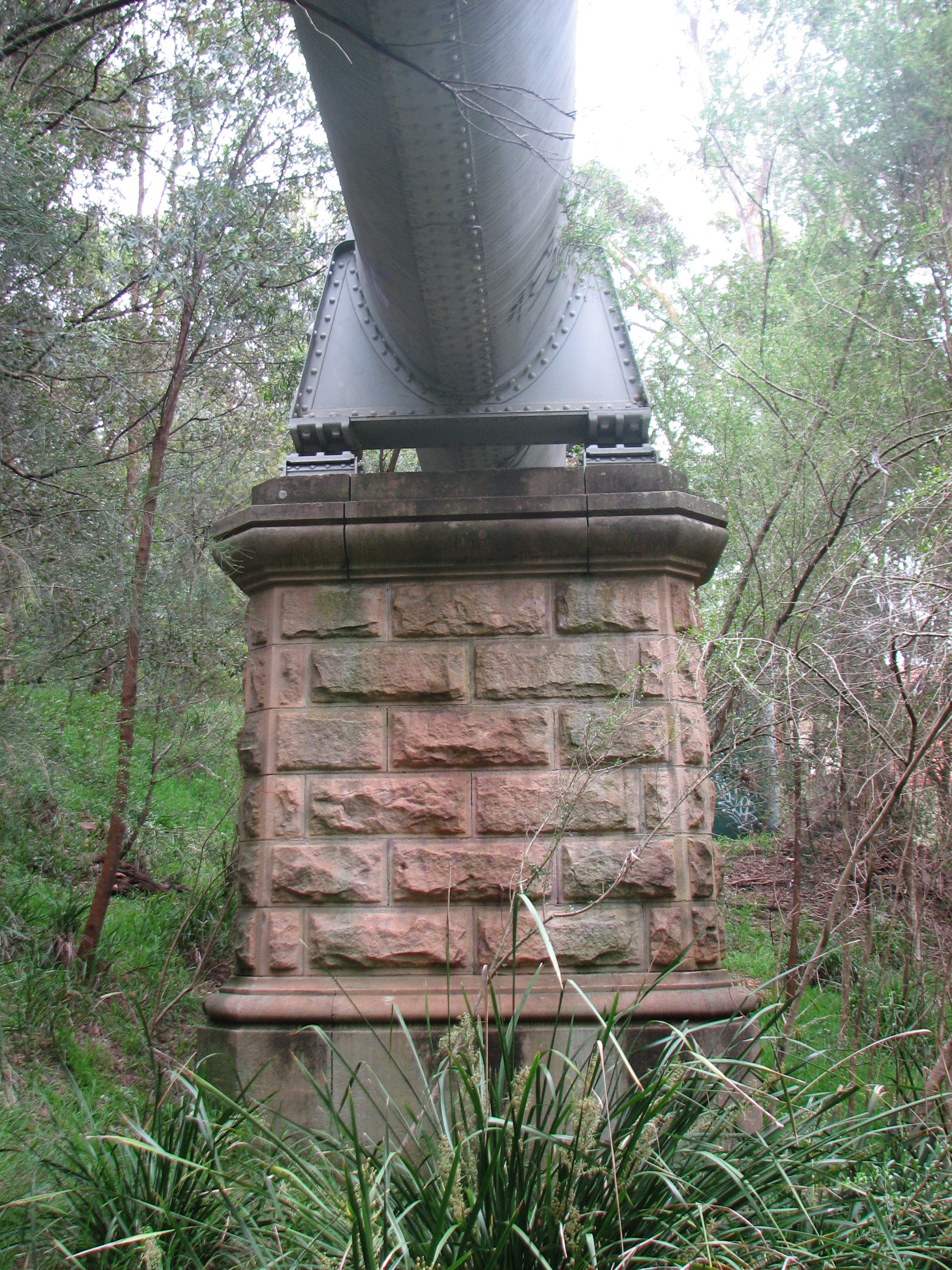
Detail of Lewisham sewage aqueduct showing construction details

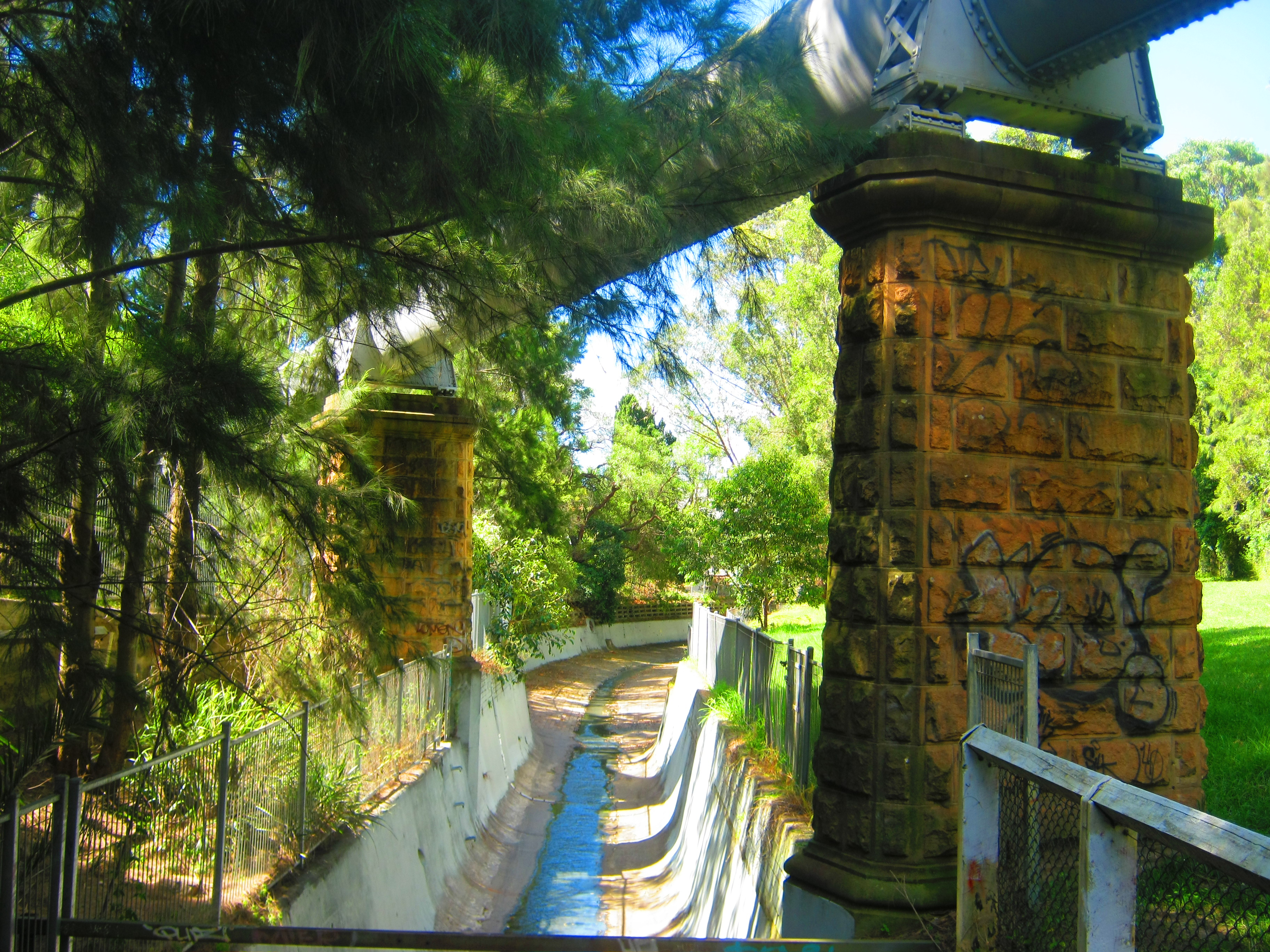
Hawthorne canal (Long Cove Creek)
