= Coral Lansbury =

Australian novelist and academic (1929–1991)

- Born: Coral Magnolia Lansbury; 14 October 1929; Melbourne, Australia
- Died: 3 April 1991 (aged 61); Philadelphia, Pennsylvania, US
- Education: PhD, English, University of Auckland
- Occupations: Scriptwriter; novelist; professor of English
- Spouses: George Edwards (m. 1953; died 1953) Bruce Turnbull (m. 1955; div. 1963) John Salmon (m. 1963; div. 1969)
- Children: Malcolm Turnbull
- Relatives: Dame Angela Lansbury (second cousin); Bruce Lansbury (second cousin); Edgar Lansbury (second cousin)
- Scientific career
- Theses: Arcady and Utopia: a study of the influence of Charles Dickens on Australian life and culture with special reference to the life and ideas of William Guthrie Spence (1967); Australia in English literature in the nineteenth century (1969)

Coral Magnolia Lansbury (14 October 1929 – 3 April 1991) was an Australian-born feminist writer and academic. Working in the United States from 1969 until her death, she became Distinguished Professor of English and Dean of Graduate Studies at Rutgers University.

A former child actor and scriptwriter, Lansbury was the author of several works of fiction and non-fiction. The latter included The Reasonable Man: Trollope's Legal Fiction (1970), Elizabeth Gaskell: The Novel of Social Crisis (1975), and The Old Brown Dog: Women, Workers, and Vivisection in Edwardian England (1985). Her best-known novel was The Grotto (1989).

Lansbury's son, Malcolm Turnbull, became the 29th Prime Minister of Australia.

== Early life and education ==
Lansbury was born in Melbourne, Victoria, to an English mother, May Lansbury (née Morle), and an Australian father, Oscar Vincent Stephen Lansbury. Her parents were stage actors in London. She was a second cousin of the British film and television actor Angela Lansbury. Her paternal grandparents were Arthur Thomas Lansbury from London, who emigrated to Australia in 1884, and Ellen Smith, an Australian whose paternal grandparents were Irish and maternal grandparents English.

Lansbury attended North Sydney Girls High School and sat the NSW Leaving Certificate in 1945, entering the University of Sydney in 1947 as an unmatriculated student. In 1948 she won the Henry Lawson poetry prize for Krubi of the Illawarra. She studied arts (history, anthropology and archaeology) and achieved first-class honours, but she was ineligible to graduate as she had not matriculated. Her student card is in the University of Sydney archives. She was the recipient of the George Arnold Wood Memorial Prize (aeq), awarded annually for proficiency in History II, and the Maud Stiles Memorial Prize (aeq), awarded annually to a woman student for proficiency in History II.

She wrote a master's thesis in 1967 at the University of Auckland titled Arcady and Utopia: a study of the influence of Charles Dickens on Australian life and culture with special reference to the life and ideas of William Guthrie Spence. She wrote an entry on Charles Dickens for the Australian Dictionary of Biography. The title of her 1969 doctoral thesis was Australia in English literature in the nineteenth century. Afterwards, she moved to Philadelphia in the United States.

== Career ==
At 19, Lansbury started work at the Australian Broadcasting Commission (as it was then known). Her father worked in the early radio industry in Australia with the ABC, and he got her a part in a radio drama. She worked as both a scriptwriter and actor in radio during its heyday. The National Film and Sound Archive list of the productions with which she is associated as a scriptwriter includes:

- The Gate of the Sea (1948) - first radio play
- Becket: Re-enactment of the relationship between Henry II and Thomas Becket. 104 x 15-min. episodes
- Empty Arms: Drama serial about adoption and the effect on the mother. 104 x 15-min. episodes
- Fallen Angel: Angel, a successful model whose husband dies leaving her with a newborn child. 146 x 15-min. episodes (1955)
- Judith: Based on the biblical story of Judith, played by actress Judi Farr. 104 x 15-min. episodes.
- The Reverend Matthew A story about a country minister. 1105 x 15-min. episodes (1956–59)
- Stairway to Fame Cast included Sheila Sewell, Ray Barrett, Dinah Shearing, Lyndall Barbour, John Meillon, Max Orbiston, Margo Lee, Neva Carr Glyn, Ruth Cracknell, Queenie Ashton. 208 episodes (c. 1954)
- Thirty Minutes To Go: Mystery drama. 30 minutes.
- This Was Sylvia Dramatic story of a beautiful and insatiably ambitious woman. 208 x 15-min. episodes. 1956
- The Bombora (1958)
- Krubi of the Illawarra (1949) - radio play
- The Bronze Plain
- Mockery Bend
- The Living Rock
- True Dog Stories: Stories about different breeds of dogs. 26 x 15-min. episodes (1960s)
- No Flags for Geebang (1958) - television play.
- The Court of Angels (1959) - radio play
- Account Rendered at Ringarra (1962) - radio play

She worked for the ABC into the 1960s but as television supplanted radio drama she turned more to academic interests. After gaining her doctorate, Lansbury worked as an academic in the United States. Her major interest was Victorian literature. Between 1975 and 1984 she wrote four books on Anthony Trollope and other Victorian literary figures. She was president of the Victorian Studies Association and of the Victorian executive committee of the Modern Language Association. She became Professor of English at Rutgers University in New Jersey and the first dean of the Graduate School at the Camden Campus.

Lansbury wrote five works of fiction: Ringarra (1985), Sweet Alice (1986), Felicity (1987), The Grotto (1989), and Opium!, published posthumously. One of her book reviewers was her son, Malcolm Turnbull. He wrote in his regular column in The Bulletin magazine in 1981, of The Reasonable Man: Trollope's Legal Fiction (1970): "It is refreshing, if not surprising, to find someone who maintains that that most pellucid of novelists, Anthony Trollope, owed his literary style to the law.... The book provides a fresh insight into the novels of Trollope and to an explanation for his style."

== Personal life ==
Lansbury's first marriage was to radio producer George Edwards, her godfather and friend of her father, on 20 February 1953. Edwards had enjoyed some fame as Dad in Dad and Dave from Snake Gully. Lansbury was his fourth wife and was 40 years his junior. The next day, he was admitted to hospital with pneumonia and died six months later, on 28 August 1953. Lansbury had a "whirlwind romance" with Bruce Turnbull, who became her second husband, and in 1954, she gave birth prematurely to her son, Malcolm Turnbull.

In 1963, she moved to New Zealand after separating from Bruce Turnbull, and later married John Salmon, a university professor. Her son, Malcolm, was raised by his father after she left the family home when Malcolm was 10 years old.

== Death ==
Lansbury died of bowel cancer on 3 April 1991, aged 61, at her home in Philadelphia.

== Selected works ==
- Lansbury, Coral (1970). Arcady in Australia: The Evocation of Australia in Nineteenth-century English Literature. Melbourne University Press.
- —— (1970). The Reasonable Man: Trollope's Legal Fiction. Princeton University Press. ISBN 0-691-06457-1.
- —— (1975). Elizabeth Gaskell: The Novel of Social Crisis. Elek. ISBN 0-236-31147-6.
- —— (1985). The Old Brown Dog: Women, Workers, and Vivisection in Edwardian England. University of Wisconsin Press. ISBN 0-299-10250-5.
- —— (1985). Ringarra. Harper & Row. ISBN 0-06-015516-7.
- —— (1985). Felicity. Dutton. ISBN 0-525-24561-8.
- —— (1989). The Grotto. Knopf. ISBN 0-394-57438-9.
- —— (1989). Sweet Alice. E. P. Dutton. ISBN 0-525-24825-0.
