= Crazy Family =

1939 radio serial by Sumner Locke Elliott

- Genre: serial
- Running time: 15 mins (7:45 pm – 8:00 pm)
- Country of origin: Australia
- Language: English
- Starring: George Edwards; Nell Stirling
- Written by: Sumner Locke Elliott
- Produced by: George Edwards
- Recording studio: Sydney
- Original release: March 1939 – 1939
- Sponsored by: Woolworths

Crazy Family is a 1939 Australian radio series by Sumner Locke Elliott for the George Edwards Players. It was about the eccentric Bonnett family.

Elliott appeared as a regular cast member in addition to writing episodes.

The series was sponsored by Woolworths which was unusual at the time. It appears to have been cancelled by April 1939. The serial was replaced by Geoffry Hamlyn Tells, also sponsored by Woolworths.

== Premise ==
"Concerns the erratic antics of the Bonnet family. Their peculiar traits of character and their hobbies make living with them even more complicated. Mrs. Bonnet gives music lessons, collects strays cats and proceeds through life in a delightfully vague blur. Her daughter Felicity, in between catching whales, brings home a new fiance practically every week. The son, Kevin, plays drums and takes delight in setting off fire-alarms in shops, and their old Uncle Elija plays with trains. The Bonnets also have two Swedish servants, Mr. and Mrs. Stradivarius, who have eleven children, all of whom come to live in the Bonnet mansion. Life, of course, is hectic and the action is swift and uproarious in comedy. The Bonnets are left a fortune and almost as suddenly it is almost robbed from them by the entrance of a forgotten relative. "

== Cast ==
- George Edwards as Mr. Stradivarius
- Nell Sterling as Clodda
- Sumner Locke Elliott as Kevin Bonnet
