= Krubi of the Illawarra =

- Genre: verse play
- Running time: 60 mins (9:30 pm – 10:30 pm)
- Country of origin: Australia
- Language: English
- Home station: 2FC
- Syndicates: ABC
- Written by: Coral Lansbury
- Directed by: Robert Montgomery
- Recording studio: Sydney
- Original release: June 10, 1949

Krubi of Illawarra is an Australian radio verse play by Coral Lansbury. It was her first notable play and was written when she was nineteen.

Lansbury wrote the play while studying anthropology at university. It was inspired by Professor A. P. Elkin's book The Australian Aborigines.

The play won the 1948 Henry Lawson prize for poetry.

Lansbury played the title role in the original 1949 production. It was one of the most highly regarded Australian radio plays of the 1940s. The play was produced again in 1951.

== Premise ==
Krubi, a young Aboriginal woman, defies the strictures of her group by enquiring into knowledge normally reserved for men. She refuses to marry Arilla, her betrothed. Arilla shows Krubi Churinga, the secret place of men's initiations.

Wingaree, a wise Aboriginal edler, watches on.

== Notes ==
- Lansbury, Coral (1949). "Krubi of the Illawarra: A Radio Play". University of Sydney SRC. Hermes, Sydney. pp. 66–76.
