= No Flags for Geebang =

- Armchair Theatre episode
- Episode no.: Season 2 Episode 39
- Directed by: Stuart Latham
- Written by: Coral Lansbury
- Original air date: June 8, 1958
- Running time: 60 mins

No Flags for Geebang is a 1958 British television play by Coral Lansbury.

== Premise ==
In a pub in the small Australian bush town of Geebang the locals look forward to an unexpected visit by the Queen. Two councillors team up to divert the Queen's visit to their town but they are challenged by a woman determined to find a husband.

== Cast ==
- Donald Pleasence as Duke
- Kenneth J. Warren as sheep farmer
- Lyle O'Hara as pub owner
- Jack McGowan as pub oner

== Reception ==
The Daily Telegraph said it "promised well but never rose to any great heights."

The Liverpool Daily Post called it "amusing and original".
