= The Bronze Plain =

- Genre: verse drama play
- Running time: 70 mins (7:30 pm – 8:40 pm)
- Country of origin: Australia
- Language: English
- Home station: 2BL
- Syndicates: ABC
- Written by: Coral Lansbury
- Directed by: Eric John
- Recording studio: Sydney
- Original release: November 5, 1951

ABC Weekly 20 Oct 1951

The Bronze Plain is a 1951 Australian radio play written by Coral Lansbury.

It was one of a number of acclaimed verse dramas produced by the ABC following the success of The Fire on the Snow.

The play was produced again in 1952 and twice in 1955 (a Brisbane production directed by Raymond Menmuir and a Melbourne production

== Reception ==
Leslie Rees wrote "By virtue of vivid, fluent verse, it evoked a picture of cold evil in the steely, ruthless Captain Godwin, contrasted with lyrical elements in the love of Godwin’s daughter for Brian McRae, a land-owning part-Aboriginal with a tongue to speak of both his heartache and his country."

The Adelaide Mail said the characters "hammered... the listeners', ears with such a thunder of platitudes and portentous epigrams that the shipwreck scene almost came as comic relief. The turgid business ended in a welter of gore and iambic pentameters that surely left the stage in a greater mess than any since Humpty Dumpty took his historic plunge. I feel it best to leave the players cloaked anonymity. After all, they have to eat, I suppose."

The Age, reviewing the 1952 production, called it "unbelievable and unpoetic... why must our local dramatists always wallow in horror?"

== Premise ==
The story of wreckers in colonial New South Wales.

According to ABC Weekly "as it opens, two men face each other over a pile of documents in a little room at the Sydney barracks. Captain Godwin, steely and calculating, has demanded of Major Croudace a grant of land. He has asked not the fertile plain land which is readily available, but a stretch of barren country along the rocky coast. He asks also for four hardened “lifers” to work it. Major Croudace senses that something is amiss, but he can hardly guess that Captain Godwin intends to make his fortune, not from farming, but from wrecking and plundering ships. Downstairs, meanwhile, the annual ball is in progress. Among the guests is Brian Mcßae, a young man of fine character, but brooding bitterly under the hurt of social ostracism, for he is of half-caste blood. Another guest is Katherine, Godwin's daughter. The two are instantly attracted. Thus the seeds are sown for a drama of conflicting loyalties and interests, in which harshness and evil are counterbalanced by eloquent and poetic tenderness."
