= The John Berne School =

Location
- Lewisham, Sydney, New South Wales; Australia; 33°53′35″S 151°08′56″E

Information
- School type: Private
- Motto: Hope always
- Religious affiliation: Christian
- Denomination: Catholic
- Opened: 1998
- Principal: James Le Huray
- Teaching staff: 13 to 16 teachers
- Employees: 25
- Key people: 3 counsellors, 5 support staff
- Years offered: 7–10
- Age range: 12–16
- Enrolment: 45 (2011)
- Website: www.johnberneschool.org
- From the 2011 annual report

The John Berne School, previously known as the Berne Education Centre is in Lewisham, Sydney, Australia. The school caters for students in Years 7–10 from mainstream schools in the Sydney area and who have behavioural or emotional problems or who are otherwise at risk of not completing their education.

Berne shares a large campus (formerly St Thomas Boys High School) with 2 other small schools: the Catholic Intensive English Centre and a small satellite school of Trinity Grammar (pre Kindergarten–Year 2).

The school opened on 28 April 1998, with a staff of five teachers and two support staff. The initial enrolment consisted of 28 students. It replaced the Benedict Community School, which had been in operation since 1976.

Berne is a registered special school and founding member of the Association of Catholic Special School Services (ACSSS). It provides an education to those young people who are at risk of not completing their School Certificate (the basic level of qualification in New South Wales). Mainstream classes are unsuitable for most of the students because of behavioural, emotional, and familial reasons.

The John Berne School is owned and operated by the Marist Brothers, an order founded in France during the early 19th century by St Marcellin Champagnat.

== Culture ==
The school caters for students who may be experiencing problems due to physical, psychological, emotional and/or familial reasons. They may also have learning difficulties and/or disorders. Their placement at Berne could be short term, where the aim is to work on the student's behavioural or emotional issues in order to reintegrate them back into their mainstream school, or long term, where the aim is to continue to educate them through to the School Certificate.

The school's culture has been designed to defuse a lot of the behavioural triggers the students were experiencing in mainstream schools. For example, there is no uniform and there is no set homework.

The student-teacher relationship is unusual compared to mainstream schools. Students address staff by their first name, and even eat meals together. All staff are expected to get involved in all school activities, such as camps, excursions and personal development activities.

There is a strong focus on reducing the derailing effects of learning difficulties and disorders by having small class sizes (of about five or six students per class), and by streaming students based on ability. The lower ability classes are purposefully even smaller, usually having only two or three students per teacher.

== Special features ==
The school is unusual in its very high staff-to-student ratio. It is also distinctive in providing a number of special programs:

- Counselling to assist with behavioural needs
- Breakfast program
- Student Withdrawal Assistance Program (SWAP), a program to enable other schools to respond appropriately to the special needs of struggling students
- "Cracking the Code" literacy program
- Outdoor education program, which provides a camp or outdoor activity each term
- A daily living skills program, covering topics like meal preparation and shopping within a budget
- Preparation for the workplace by way of writing job applications, appropriate workplace behaviour and the like, supplemented by work experience placements
- Changing Lanes Program, for ex-students proceeding to employment, or starting an apprenticeship or other course

== Recognition ==
In 2006, the John Berne School received a "Highly Commended National Achievement in School Improvement" award from the Australian Institute for Teaching and School Leadership.

== Pete's Place campus ==
The John Berne School has since 2010 operated a second campus, called Pete's Place School, at Blacktown. Pete's Place operates in a different way from the main campus of the John Berne School: it has a smaller number of students (15 approximately) and the instruction, provided by three full-time teachers and one part-time teacher's aide, is more individual.
