= Dad and Dave from Snake Gully =

- Genre: Comedy
- Country of origin: Australia
- Language: English
- Starring: George Edwards; Nell Stirling
- Created by: Steele Rudd
- Written by: Maurice Francis; Lorna Bingham
- Produced by: George Edwards
- Original release: 1937 – 1953

Dad and Dave from Snake Gully was an Australian radio drama series based on the On Our Selection stories of Steele Rudd. The series is more often referred to simply as Dad and Dave. It was hugely popular and ran for 2276 episodes, almost 17 years. The first episode was broadcast on 1 April 1937 and the last on 29 December 1953.

The show was created, and for most of its existence starred, George Edwards whose company, the George Edwards Production Unit, created it. Its sponsor for its entire run was the Wrigley Company. The show's cast was not made public so that (the Barrier Daily Truth told its readers in 1951) 'the characters may stand in their own right.' Edwards died in 1953, and the show ceased production at the end of that year.

The theme tune was "The Road to Gundagai". The standard accent used by actors and announcers in Australian broadcasting at the time was typically "Southern English", an upper class British version that emulated the BBC. The actual Australian accent was however acceptable only in low comedy productions such as this series.

The program's popularity meant it resonated with the general population in a variety of ways, particularly during the Second World War, such as when:

Dave, overseas with the Air Force, received anonymous letters stating that Mabel was unfaithful. The letter Dave wrote to Mabel reaffirmed his faith in her and was full of hope for their future. So many listeners felt it expressed their own situation that stations were besieged with requests for copies and eventually the letter had to be published.

One unique element of the show was the annual 'Snake Gully Cup'. In 1953 the Maryborough (Queensland) Chronicle reported:

The Snake Gully Cup has proved itself radio's most sensationally popular sporting event. Broadcast annually on the same day as the Melbourne Cup, the "Snake Gully" Cup has always aroused such tremendous interest amongst the listening public that, on the day of the broadcast, the key station 2UW has to appoint extra staff to the switchboard to cope with incoming calls. "Snake Gully" cup sweeps are run in homes and offices all over the Commonwealth.

This famous Australian radio drama series can still be heard on Melbourne's Golden Days Radio 95.7FM (GDR95.7fm) every Saturday morning at 8.30am. The program is streamed around the world on www.goldendaysradio.com at that time. Dad and Dave is also heard on Vintage FM (87.6 Hawkesbury, 87.8 Penrith and 88.7 Camden) weekdays at 4 am, 10:30 am and 9 pm & in Newcastle Newy 87.8 FM daily at 2 am.

== Cast ==
- George Edwards and Lou Vernon as Dad
- Max Osbiston and John Saul as Dave
- Nell Stirling and Margaret Christensen as Mabel
- Lorna Bingham as Annie Morton
- Loris Bingham and Hope Suttor as Mum
- George Edwards and Tom Farley as Alf Morton
- George Edwards and Rodney Jacobs as Ted Ramsay
- Dorothy Whitely as Rita Ramsay
- Eric Scott as Bill Smith
- Ethel Gabriel as Mrs. Smith
- Lyndall Barbour as Madame Deemer
- Warren Barry and Ken Fraser as Ernie Crossley
- Hannah Coulter as Pearl
- Timothy Coulter as Mick
