= The Living Rock =

- Genre: drama play
- Running time: 60 mins (4:10 pm – 5:10 pm)
- Country of origin: Australia
- Language: English
- Home station: 2FC
- Syndicates: ABC
- Written by: Coral Lansbury
- Original release: April 13, 1952

The Living Rock is a 1952 Australian radio play by Coral Lansbury. It was a modern-day Passion Play but "modern in style" according to Lansbury.

It was composed especially for Easter. The play was one of the most highly regarded Australian radio plays of the 1950s.

== Premise ==
In a small French village under German occupation, a Nazi lieutenant is in love with a Frenchwoman, Dominique. He decides to destroy an iron cross set in a rock in the hill of the village, revered by the devout villagers.
