= Lewisham Sewer Vent =

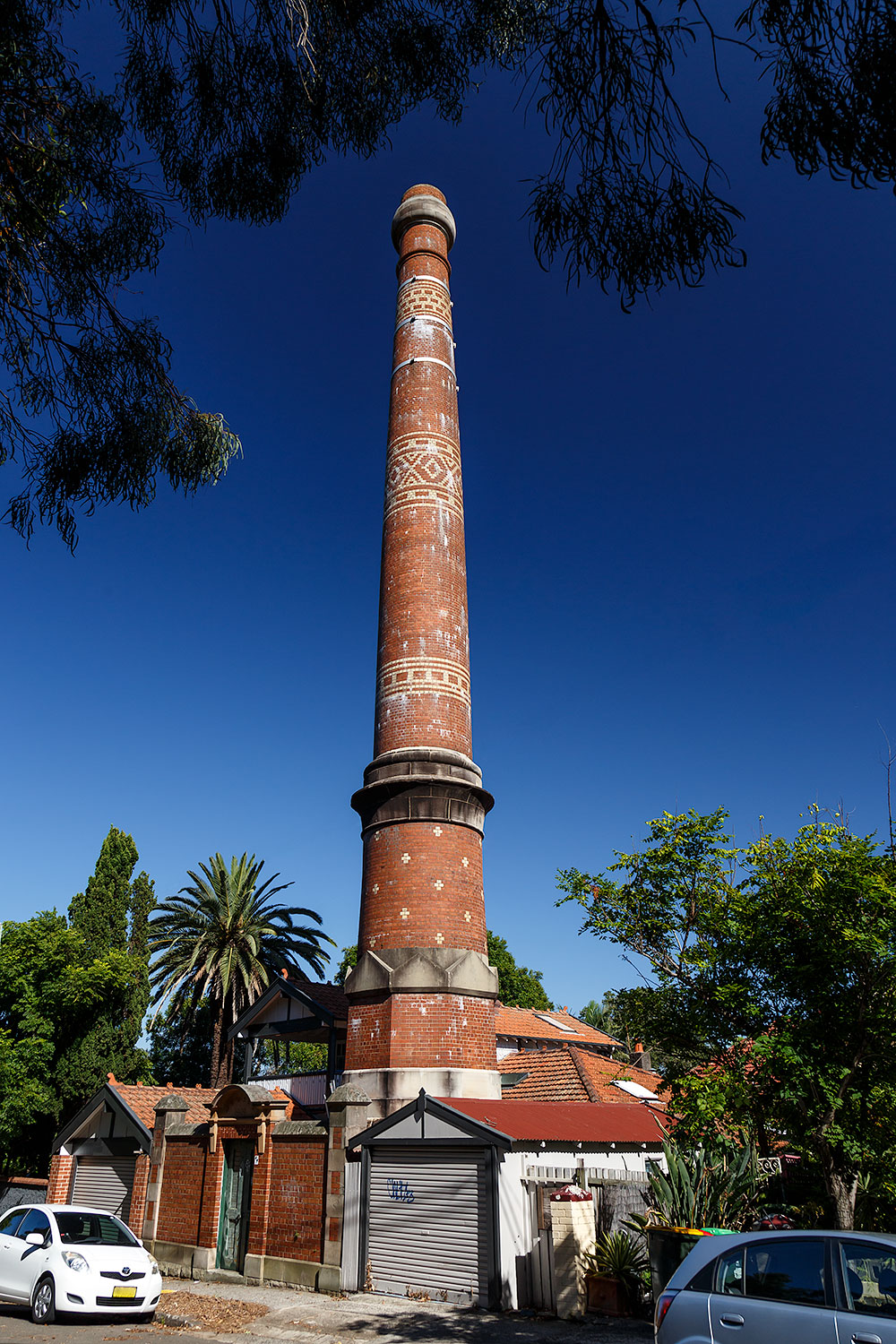
- Lewisham Sewer Vent, 2019

- Location within Sydney Location within Australia
- 33.8950°S 151.1494°E
- Location: The Boulevarde, Lewisham, Inner West Council, Sydney, New South Wales, Australia

History
- Built: 1909

Site notes
- Architect: New South Wales Public Works Department
- Owner: Sydney Water

New South Wales Heritage Register
- Official name: Sewer Vent; Lewisham Sewer Vent; The Boulevarde Sewer Vent
- Type: state heritage (built)
- Designated: 15 November 2002
- Reference no.: 1640
- Type: Other - Utilities - Sewerage
- Category: Utilities - Sewerage

Lewisham Sewer Vent is a heritage-listed sewer vent shaft at The Boulevarde, Lewisham, Inner West Council, Sydney, New South Wales, Australia. It was designed by NSW South Wales Public Works Department and built from 1909 to 1909. It is also known as The Boulevarde Sewer Vent. The property is owned by Sydney Water. It was added to the New South Wales State Heritage Register on 15 November 2002.

== History ==
The Northern Branch Main sewer was partly completed by 1901 and was completed before the Western Main Branch. This Branch was a siphon at the low point in Illawarra Road near Sydenham Road. The siphon is maintained by the sewage being diverted temporarily to SPS 271 for flushing purposes. This pumps it to the Eastern Branch Main Sewer.

The Dobroyd Submain discharges into this Branch at Lewisham at the point where the Lewisham Vent Shaft is located. This vent was completed in 1909 and is only one of a handful of like shafts in Sydney Water system.

Steel straps to the shaft were added in the mid to late twentieth century.

== Description ==
Located some 25 metres north of Hunter Street and fronting the Boulevard is a Queen Anne revival brick and stone fence and timber entrance doors behind which is the brick and stone vent shaft. This shaft is an excellent example of the brick and stonemasons craft built in 1909. The overall height of the vent shaft is approximately 9 storeys with rubbed red and cream glazed brick decoration. The pedestal is octagonal in plan with the shaft emanating at a stone transition to circular in plan with entasis from the base. The bottom of the pedestal is coursed rock faced stone to rusticated stone to 19 courses of English bond brick, upon which is the stone transition course from octagonal to circular. The pedestal extends in a circular brick form of 36 courses in English bond to a stone coursed base of the shaft, the brick shaft being surmounted by a stone course with brick cap. It is possible there was a decorative cowl however there is no evidence of that now. Directly around the base is a reconstructed federation period domestic dwelling (using the base as part of their land use). Across the road in The Boulevard is a public school and the remaining houses surrounding the vent shaft are generally detached late Victorian and Federation period dwellings. The vent shaft is particularly noticeable on the vista from Wardell Street.

The pediment above the entrance reads MBW-S&S; 1909.

The entrance doors are in timber and likely to be original although the panels may be later.

The structure is substantially intact and in good condition apart from the need for repointing in strategic places particularly of the fence and in areas of the shaft. Three steel bands are fitted to the upper portion of the shaft to assist in stabilising the fabric. The fence in its design and scale sits well with the adjoining streetscape.

== Heritage listing ==
The strategic use of polychrome brick work and moulded brick details along with a considerably intact entrance fence and shaft make this structure arguably the most elaborate one of its type left in the Sydney Water system, or in NSW. The quality of workmanship and detailing is unlikely to be seen again in this type of structure. The shaft is a landmark in the area which can be seen as far as surrounding ridge tops.

Lewisham Sewer Vent was listed on the New South Wales State Heritage Register on 15 November 2002 having satisfied the following criteria.

The place is important in demonstrating the course, or pattern, of cultural or natural history in New South Wales.

The vent shaft is an important historical element in the operation of the northern branch main and Dobroyd submain.

The place is important in demonstrating aesthetic characteristics and/or a high degree of creative or technical achievement in New South Wales.

The sewer vent is a landmark and highly visible and well detailed element of the townscape.

The place has a strong or special association with a particular community or cultural group in New South Wales for social, cultural or spiritual reasons.

The vent shaft is likely to be held in high regard by the local community as a landmark structure in the locality, and has been recognised by the National Trust of Australia (NSW).

The place has potential to yield information that will contribute to an understanding of the cultural or natural history of New South Wales.

The vent shaft exhibits a high level of craftsmanship, with intricate and well-executed detailing that would be difficult to replicate.

The vent performs an essential function in the proper operation of the sewer system.

The place possesses uncommon, rare or endangered aspects of the cultural or natural history of New South Wales.

As part of a small collective number of like Sydney Water Vent shafts, and in the quality they have been undertaken, they are a Statewide significant piece of infrastructure.

The place is important in demonstrating the principal characteristics of a class of cultural or natural places/environments in New South Wales.

In terms of venting function solely, it is representative of like items in the systems.
