= It's Never Too Late to Mend (radio serial) =

The Sun 10 May 1936

It's Never Too Late to Mend is a 1936 Australian radio serial from the George Edwards Players based on the novel It's Never Too Late to Mend by Charles Reade. It was written by Maurice Francis.

The serial was one of several successful radio serials from Edwards. Unlike most radio serials, which were set outside of Australia, It's Never Too Late had an Australian setting.

The serial aired Monday to Thursday at 8.30 p.m. It ended in June 1936.
