= Lewisham, New South Wales =

Lewisham
- Suburb
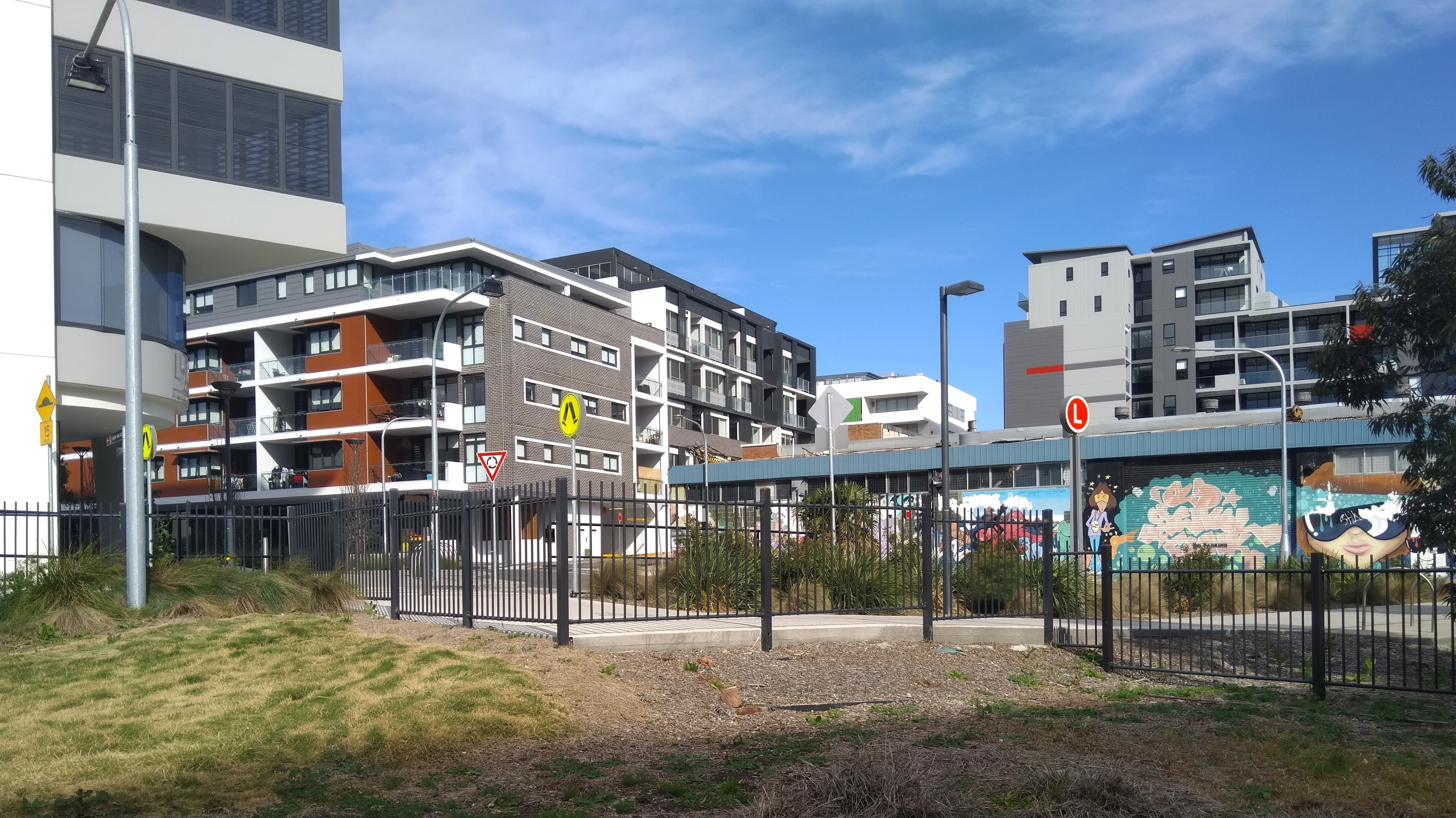
- Hudson Street

- Interactive map of Lewisham
- Country: Australia
- State: New South Wales
- City: Sydney
- LGA: Inner West Council
- Location: 7 km (4.3 mi) south-west of Sydney CBD

Government
  - State electorates: Summer Hill; Newtown
  - Federal division: Grayndler

Area
  - Total: 0.64 km^{2} (0.25 sq mi)
- Elevation: 22 m (72 ft)

Population
  - Total: 4,060 (2021 census)
  - Density: 6,340/km^{2} (16,430/sq mi)
- Postcode: 2049
Suburbs around Lewisham
Haberfield	Leichhardt	Leichhardt
Summer Hill	Lewisham	Petersham
Dulwich Hill	Dulwich Hill	Marrickville

Lewisham is a suburb in the Inner West of Sydney, in the state of New South Wales, Australia. Lewisham is located 7 kilometres (4.3 mi) south-west of the Sydney central business district, in the local government area of Inner West Council.

== History ==
At the time of settlement by Europeans, Lewisham was within the territory of the Gadigal people of the Eora nation; archaeological evidence indicates Indigenous Australians have inhabited the local area for at least 7,000 years. Beginning in 1789, a smallpox epidemic wiped out most of the Gadigal population.

By 1809, all the land within Lewisham had been granted.

Lewisham took its name in 1834 from the estate of Joshua Josephson, a German-born businessman who would later become mayor of Sydney. The estate was named after the London borough of Lewisham, which means Leofsa's village or manor.

As of the 1860s, Lewisham was entirely bushland, save for the house Robert Wardell had lived in.

== Heritage listings ==
Lewisham has a number of heritage-listed sites, including:

- Great Southern and Western railway: Long Cove Creek railway viaducts, Lewisham
- The Boulevarde: Lewisham Sewer Vent
- over Long Cove Creek: Lewisham Sewage Aqueduct

It also contains the Lewisham Estate Heritage Conservation Area, which "includes several sub-precincts which share similar heritage values and development history"

== Transport ==
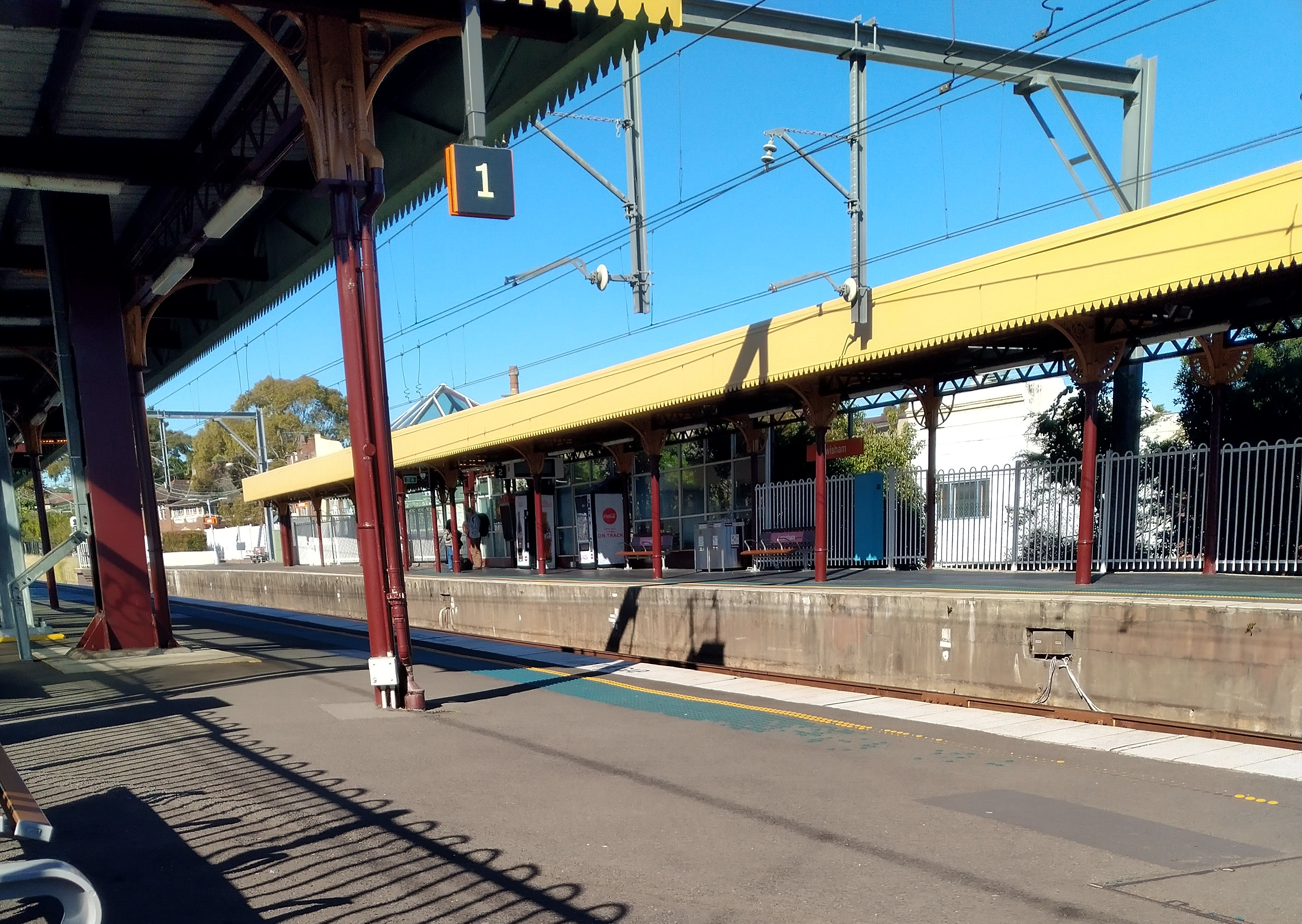
Lewisham railway station

Lewisham railway station is serviced by the Leppington & Inner West Line and Liverpool & Inner West Line of the Sydney Trains network. This provides access to Sydney CBD, the interchange station of Strathfield and the commercial centres of Burwood, Newtown and Parramatta.

Lewisham is notable in railway history as the termination point for the first train journey in the NSW colony in 1855, although the railway station was not built until 1885. The whipple truss bridge over Long Cove Creek was constructed 1885-1886 featuring North American technology developed by Squire Whipple. It is probably the most significant railway bridge site in Australia, certainly in NSW. It has the unique distinction of four different types of bridges from different eras. Engineers Australia designated the Viaduct in 1994 as an historic engineering marker.

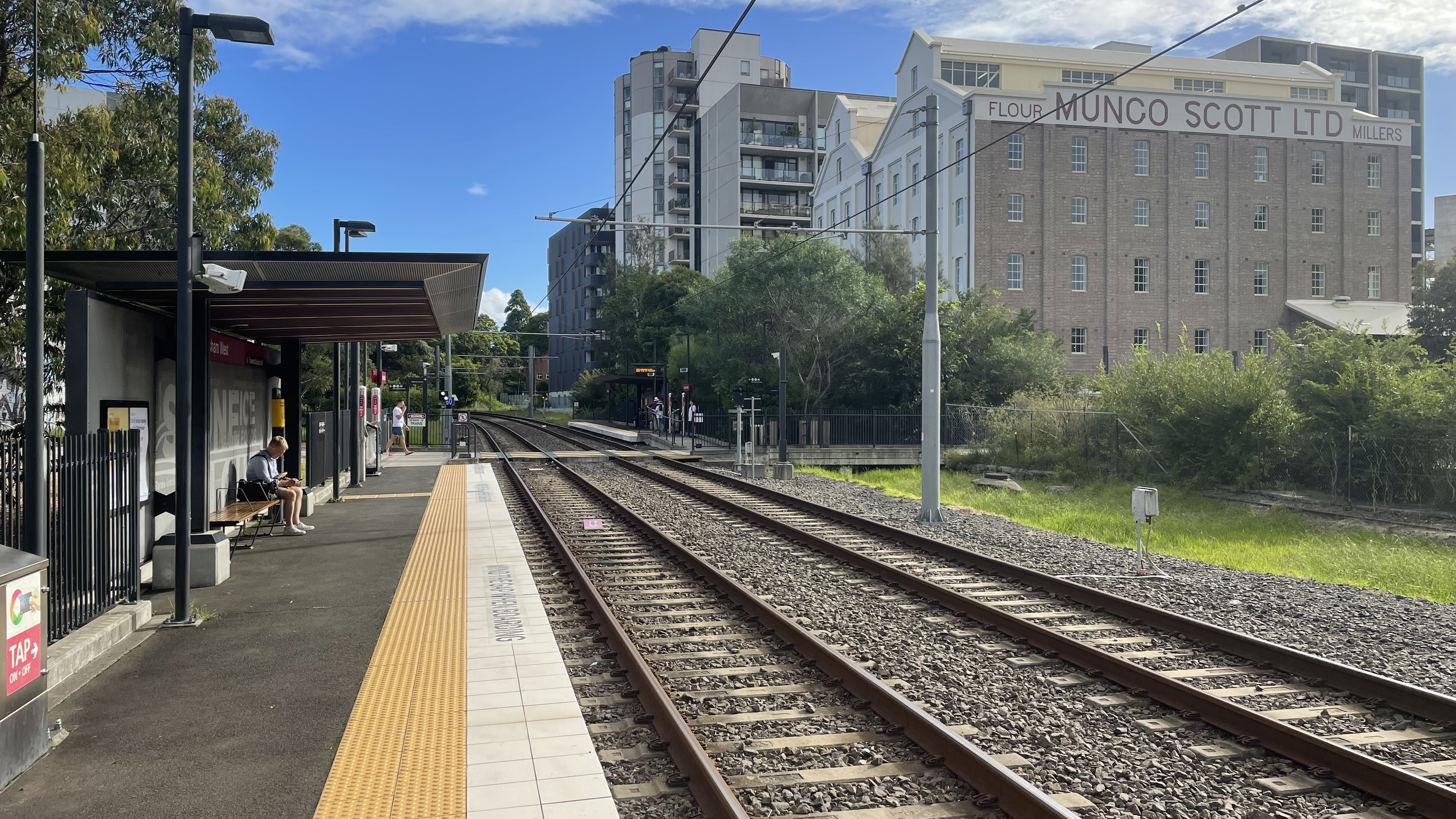
Lewisham West light-rail stop

There are two stations serving Lewisham on the Inner West Light Rail. These are Lewisham West, adjacent to the former flour mill on the border with Summer Hill, and Taverners Hill, near Parramatta Road. Access to the city is quicker by conventional train, but the light rail may be used for some cross-regional journeys. The light rail also provides an interchange with Dulwich Hill railway station to the south.

The 413 bus service, between Campsie and the city, cuts through the middle of Lewisham and provides an interchange with the railway station. Several bus services (461 - Burwood to the city, 480 & 483 - Strathfield to the city) run along Parramatta Road. These interchange with the Taverners Hill stop. The other bus corridor is along New Canterbury Rd. This is served by the 428/L28 from Canterbury to the city via Newtown and route 445 from Campsie to Balmain.

== Schools ==
A Trinity Grammar School Infants School was opened in February 2006 at 5 Thomas Street, Lewisham. The site was formerly Saint Thomas Becket Primary School which was founded in 1855 by the Sisters of Mercy. The school was originally for girls but became co-ed in the 1950s. Christian Brothers' High School is located on 58 - 61 The Boulevarde. Lewisham Public School is located on 71 The Boulevarde Lewisham. Petersham Public School is on the border of Lewisham and Petersham, the John Berne School (formerly the Berne Education Centre) and the Catholic Intensive English Centre are located on the site of the former St Thomas Boys High School, which closed in 1997.

== Churches ==
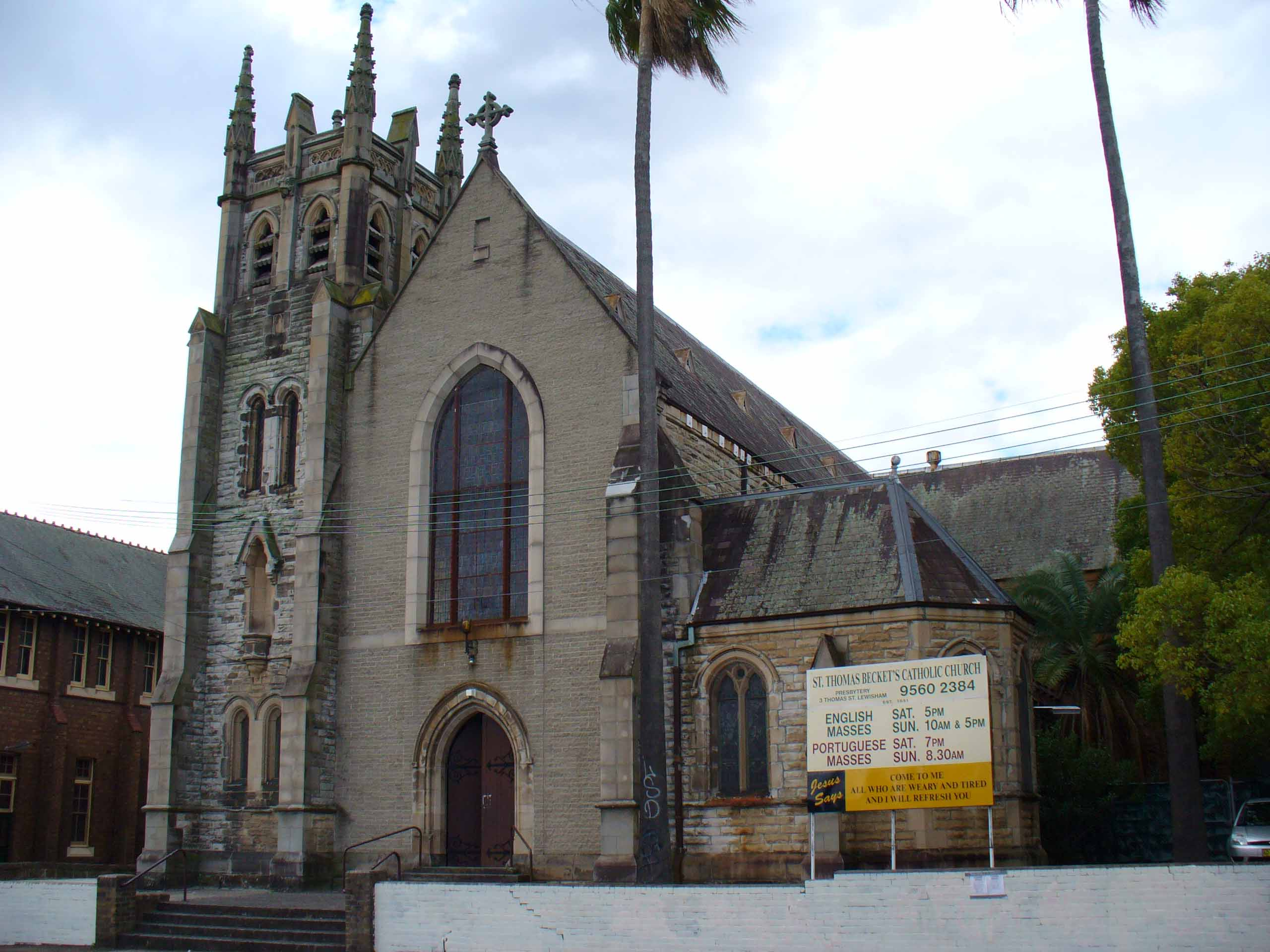
St. Thomas Becket's Church Lewisham

Saint Thomas Becket's Catholic church is located in Thomas Street. The current priest is Fr. Gerald Gleeson. The Servants of Mary Help of Christians operated its Marian Centre from St Thomas Becket Primary School Hall. It is now at 2 Missenden Rd, Camperdown, NSW 2049, operating from St. Joseph's church.

Lewisham is also the home of the Maternal Heart of Mary Latin Mass Parish, a Personal Parish for the celebration of the Extraordinary Form of the Roman Rite, of which Fr Duncan Wong FSSP is the Parish Priest. The church is situated behind St Thomas Becket's, on Charles O'Neill Way.

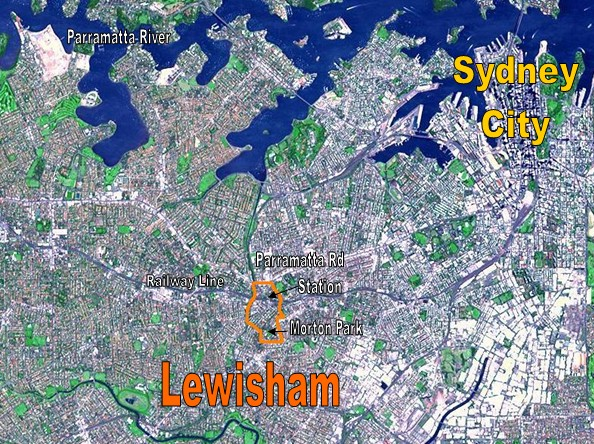
NASA image of Sydney's CBD and inner west suburbs, with borders of Lewisham shown in orange

== Demographics ==
Lewisham's population had a population of 2,927 in 2011, which had risen to 3,164 in the 2016 census and had risen to 4,060 in the 2021 census.

According to the 2021 census, Lewisham had a population of 4,060. The character of its population was different from neighbouring suburbs, by having a smaller proportion of residents born overseas. After Australia (62.1%), the most common countries of birth were China (4.1%), England (3.7%), New Zealand (2.2%), Italy (1.7%) and Vietnam (1.2%). There were also a reasonable number of Mandarin (4.2%), Cantonese (2.8%), Greek (2.1%), Italian (2.0%) and Portuguese (1.5%) speakers, who were the most common languages in the area after English. Indigenous Australians numbered 49 people (1.2%) which was less than the state and national figures.

The population had a greater proportion of people in de facto relationships and a smaller proportion of people in registered marriages than the New South Wales and Australian figures. It had a greater proportion of people stating that they had no religion (55.0%) but fewer Anglicans (5.1%) than the state and national figures, while the proportion of Roman Catholics (17.4%) was lower than New South Wales (22.4%) and national figures (20.0%).

== Notable residents ==
- Clive Caldwell (1910–1994), World War II air ace
- Les Haylen (1898–1977), author and politician, he was the local federal member of parliament from 1943-1963.
- John Shand (1897–1959), Sydney barrister from the 1920s to the 1950s who took on a number of very high-profile cases of the day.
- Mother Xavier (1870–1938) who was head of the Little Company of Mary (1899–1929) which ran Lewisham Hospital and helped make it one of the top hospitals in Sydney.
- Patrick Joseph Hartigan, bush poet, who wrote under the pseudonym "John O'Grady".
- Percy Hordern (1864–1926), a member of the New South Wales Legislative Council died in Lewisham.
