= Nell Stirling =

Australian actor, producer (1909–1951)

Helen Dorothy "Nell" Stirling (nee Mamgron, 22 August 1909 – 10 November 1951) was an Australian radio actor, singer, dancer and radio producer best known for her association with George Edwards in the Sydney radio industry.

== Biography ==
Stirling was born in Summer Hill, New South Wales to New Zealand-born father Henry James Mamgron, a sharebroker's clerk who was of Danish-German descent and Mary Rose Lawrie. She studied classical dance before joining the Tivoli circuit at the age of sixteen, where she then performed as a soubrette and tap dancer, before joining the Fullers Theatre in the chorus line.

In 1932 she started working in radio for George Edwards as his assistant, in his production "The Ghost Train" and eventually became his business and romantic partner.

The duo began working on radio at 2UE and were very successful, forming their own company, "The George Edwards Players". This became one of the largest producers of radio shows in Australia, many of which starred Stirling herself, the couple later moved to radio network 2GB in 1934.

Their scriptwriters included Lynne Foster, Lorna Bingham, Sumner Locke Elliott, Maurice Francis and Anthony Scott Veitch. Key shows included Dad and Dave from Snake Gully.

In an obituary, ABC Weekly claimed Stirling had become Australia's highest paid actress in radio.

== Personal life ==
Stirling and Edwards married on 9 November 1934 and they had a daughter together, born in April 1941. Stirling divorced Edwards in 1948, and later that year married Alexander Atwill, her accountant. She died of an accidental overdose of carbitral capsules on 10 November 1951 at home.
