= Mockery Bend =

- Genre: drama play
- Running time: 60 mins (7:30 pm – 8:30 pm)
- Country of origin: Australian
- Language: English
- Syndicates: ABC
- Written by: Coral Lansbury
- Directed by: Frank Harvey
- Recording studio: Sydney
- Original release: November 10, 1952

Mockery Bend is a 1952 Australian radio play by Coral Lansbury.

The play was very popular. It was produced again in 1953.

It was one of the most highly regarded Australian radio plays of the 1950s.

Lansbury later set her novel Sweet Alice in a town called Mockery Bend.

== Premise ==
Susan Elliot, an idealistic young teacher, is assigned to work in the banana growing area of Mockery Bend. She tries to improve the lives of children under her care.

== Reception ==
ABC Weekly called it "a brave play, for it stated conditions of inertia and degradation we all know to exist, but which we shrink from discussing for the reason that there seems to be nothing that anyone can do about it... Miss Lansbury shows how the young schoolmistress is defeated by cun-ning and cowardice, while suggesting that the more patient methods of an older generation of school teacher may in the end achieve something. Her play, I think, overstresses the moral cowardice without quite understanding the tragedy of these people’s lives, but she makes it clear that it is not material poverty so much as a total sterility of mind."

Leslie Rees called it an "incisive if rather slick drama."
