= Lorna Bingham =

Australian actor and writer

Lorna Bingham (1912 – 10 July 1970) also known as Lorna Whitworth, was an Australian actress and writer and producer best known for her work as a radio scriptwriter and children's author. She was a leading writer for George Edwards for a number of years, writing and producing many episodes of serial Dad and Dave from Snake Gully over a 9-year period, a series in which she also features as an actress.

Born to actress Loris Bingham, both her parents met and married while working in the theatre for J.C. Williamson and they then brought out Dan Barry's Company, Lorna herself began her career as an theatre actress, as a child appearing in various productions including Uncle Tom's Cabin. Her mother was the first in the family to venture into the radio sector working for the Australian Broadcasting Company followed by Lorna.
