= Summer Hill, New South Wales =

Summer Hill
- Suburb
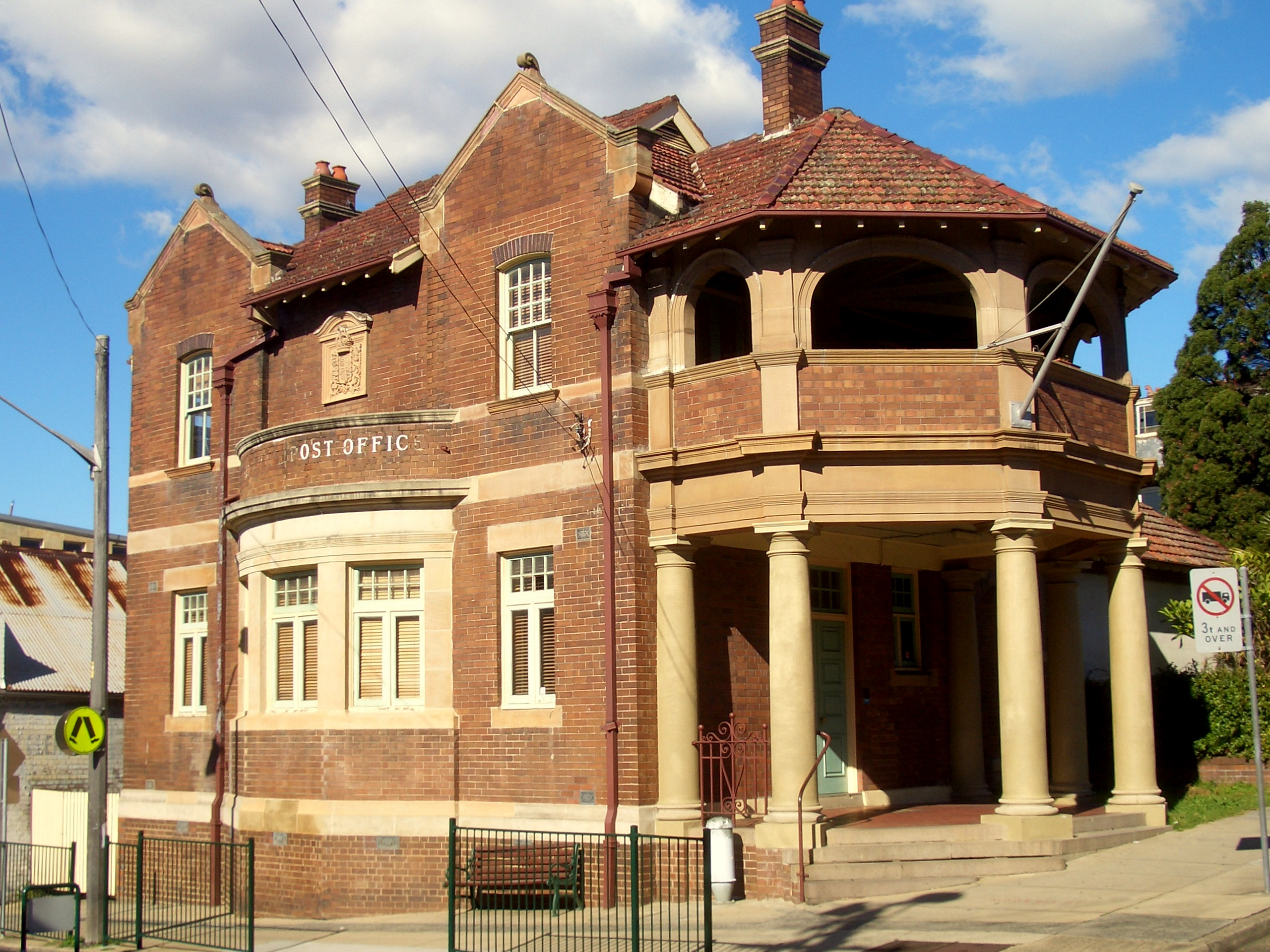
- The former Summer Hill Post Office, Smith Street, is heritage-listed

- Interactive map of Summer Hill
- Country: Australia
- State: New South Wales
- City: Sydney
- LGA: Inner West Council
- Location: 7 km (4.3 mi) west of Sydney CBD

Government
  - State electorate: Summer Hill
  - Federal division: Grayndler

Area
  - Total: 1.20 km^{2} (0.46 sq mi)
- Elevation: 21 m (69 ft)

Population
  - Total: 7,288 (2021 census)
  - Density: 6,073/km^{2} (15,730/sq mi)
- Postcode: 2130
Suburbs around Summer Hill
Croydon	Haberfield	Leichhardt
Ashfield	Summer Hill	Lewisham
Ashbury	Hurlstone Park	Dulwich Hill

Summer Hill is a suburb of Sydney, in the state of New South Wales, Australia. Summer Hill is located 7 kilometres west of the Sydney central business district, in the local government area of the Inner West Council.

Summer Hill is a primarily residential suburb of Sydney's Inner West, adjoining two of Sydney's major arterial roads, Parramatta Road and Liverpool Road. The first land grant was made in 1794 to former convict and jailor Henry Kable, and the suburb began growing following the opening of the railway station on the Main Suburban railway line, in 1879.

By the 1920s, the suburb had become relatively upper class, with large estates and mansions built throughout the suburb. Some of these still exist today. Following a transition to a working-class suburb in the mid-20th century, when many of the large estates were demolished or subdivided, the suburb today has a "village" character and a mix of medium-density apartment blocks and federation houses.

== Characteristics ==
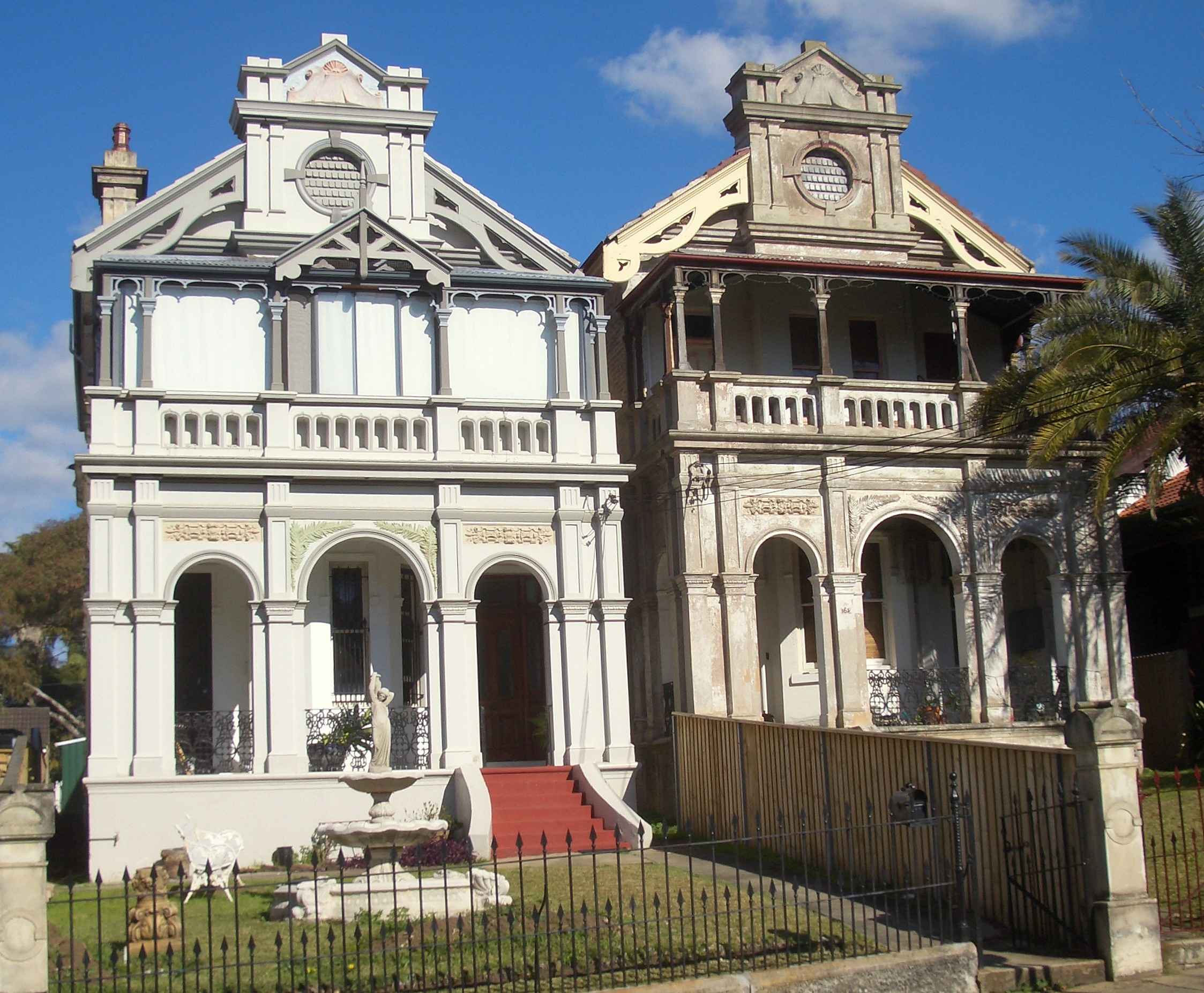
Unconventional homes in Smith Street, showing both Victorian and Federation influences

Summer Hill's boundaries are Parramatta Road and Liverpool Road to the north, the rear of the properties on the west side of Prospect Road (with a detour around Trinity Grammar School) to the West, Old Canterbury Road to the south, and the Inner West Light Rail to the east. North of Summer Hill is the suburb of Haberfield, to the east is Lewisham, to the south is Dulwich Hill, and to the west is Ashfield.

Summer Hill has a mix of Federation-era houses, with medium density apartment blocks near the railway station. Local independent business people run most of the shops. The local council has defined a village character for the suburb. Summer Hill is a suburb rich in heritage. More than one hundred properties are heritage listed, and the strong feelings of some residents of the suburb towards protecting the local architecture has seen the introduction of a heritage review, which is expected to add more properties to the heritage register.

Despite formerly being working class, Summer Hill and many of the surrounding suburbs have gradually undergone gentrification over recent years. Culturally, Summer Hill is a blend of medium-density European Sydney suburbia, with Italian influences (which are most evident in Leichhardt to the east and Haberfield to the north), Asian (mainly Chinese) influences (which are most strongly evident in Ashfield to the West), and smaller influences from many other cultures.

== History ==
=== Aboriginal anthropology ===
Before the First Fleet arrived at Port Jackson in 1788, what is now known as Summer Hill was part of a larger area where people of the Wangal and Cadigal nations lived. There is research to show in the greater Sydney region 8000 - 10000 Aboriginal people were resident, fluctuating on seasons and during tribal conflicts. What is now called the Hawthorne Canal (originally Long Cove Creek) appears to have been the boundary between the Cadigal and Wangal Aboriginal nations. Today there is a small park in Summer Hill, called Cadigal Reserve, located at 1-4 Grosvenor Crescent. A bronze plaque placed by Ashfield Council names the reserve after the Cadigal (Eora) group of Koori people. Iron Cove and the mangrove-lined estuaries of the Long Cove and Iron Cove Creeks would have provided a good source of fish and molluscs, the most common food of the coastal tribes in the Sydney Basin.

In the early days of the colony, the land between Iron Cove and the Cooks River was known as the Kangaroo Ground. This suggests that the land was open terrain favoured by kangaroos, that they were common in the area and may have formed a significant part of the Aboriginal diet.

=== European settlement ===
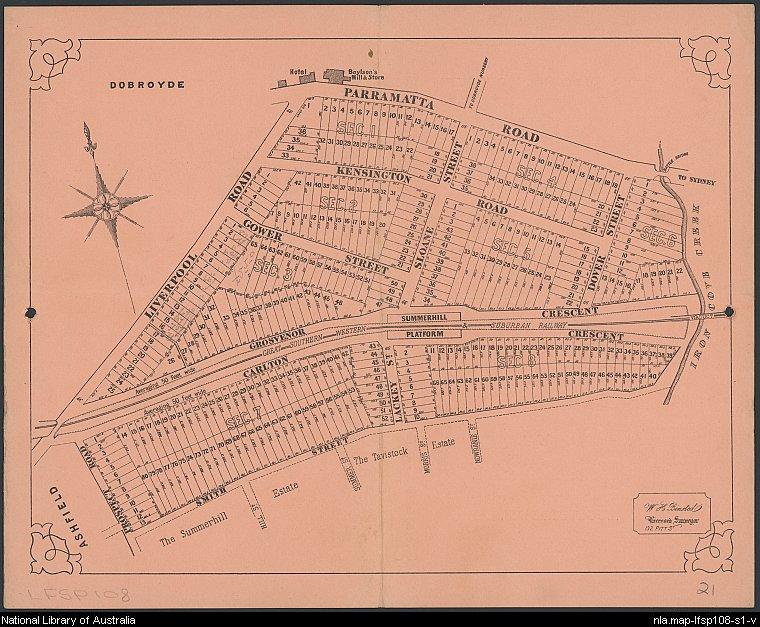
1878 subdivision plan covering the northern half of the suburb.

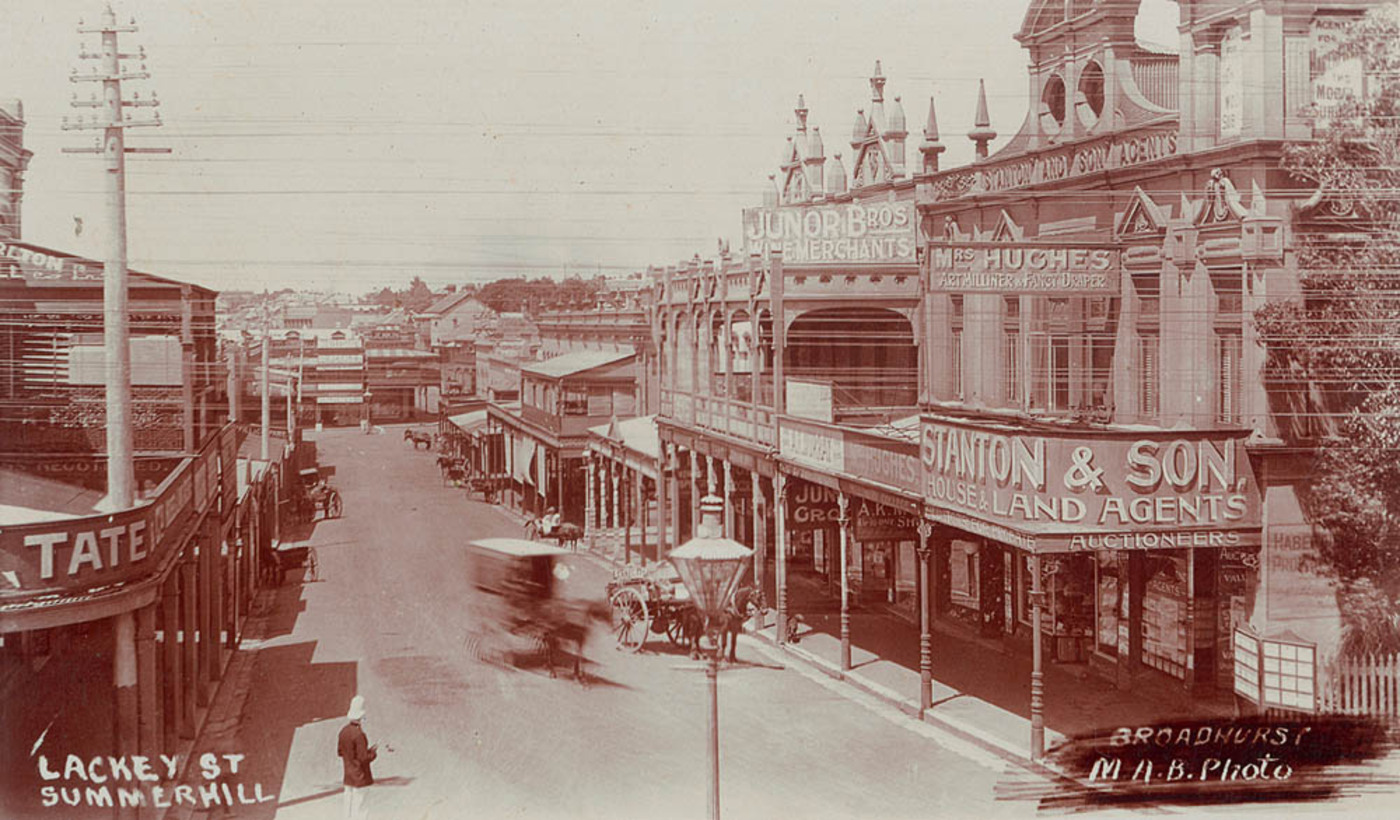
Historical view of Lackey Street.

The first land grant in this area was for a farm in 1794, to former convict and jailor Henry Kable. The land in the eastern corner of Summer Hill was an additional grant of 30 acres (12 ha) made to Henry Kable in 1804. This eastern corner would subsequently become part of the estate of James Underwood. Underwood died in 1844 and left a will so complicated that it required special legislation before it could be subdivided.

An early known use of the name "Summer Hill" was on Saturday 8 December 1849 when The Bathurst Free Press reported it as the residence of James and Ann Bennett who were tried and convicted of participation in the Wellington Mail Robbery. However, the location reported most likely refers to the place now known as Summer Hill Creek, near Orange, New South Wales. The name was used in 1876, for a land subdivision adjacent to the present-day St Andrew's Anglican Church. The name Summer Hill is thought to be a name chosen by the land sub-divider, presumably based on an attachment for England. Local historians regard the suggestion that the name is a derivation of "Sunning Hill" as a dubious story which has no substance.

Summer Hill's largest mansion, Carleton (now the Grosvenor Hospital's main building), was built in the early 1880s on Liverpool Road for Charles Carleton Skarrat. The suburb boomed with the opening of the railway station in 1879, and was followed by subdivision of much of the surrounding area. Between 1880 and 1910, the area became an upper-class suburb, and was a popular choice for professionals in banking and insurance who worked in the city. Subdivision of gardens for housing continued in the 1920s and 1930s, and socioeconomically the suburb changed as some of the wealthier inhabitants moved to the North Shore. Demolition of most of the surviving mansions in the 1970s allowed erection of home units, especially within walking distance of the railway station.

== Heritage listings ==
Summer Hill has a number of heritage-listed sites, including:

- Grosvenor Crescent: Lewisham Sewage Aqueduct

== Places of worship ==
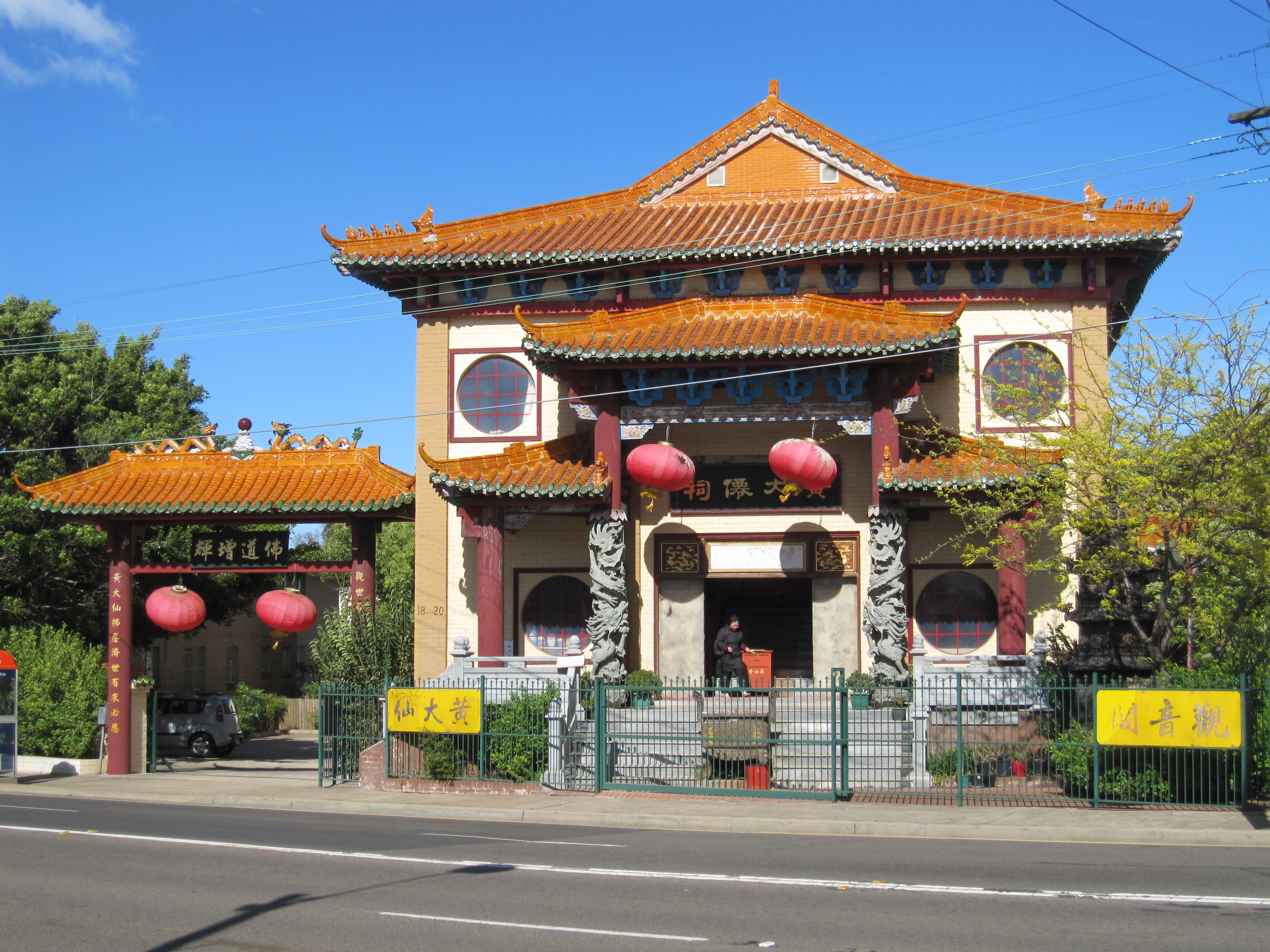
Wong Tai Sin & Kwan Yin Kur temple

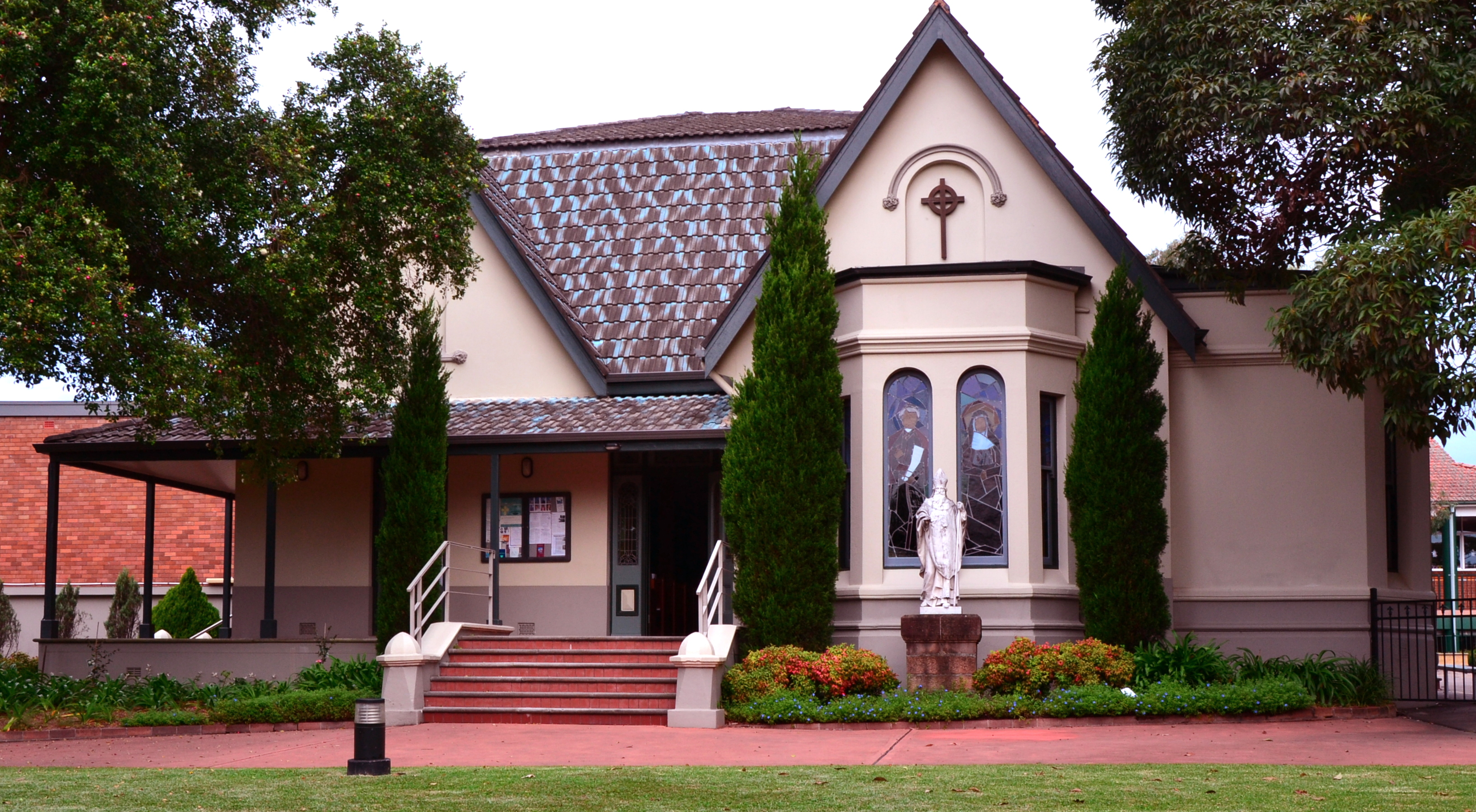
St Patrick's Catholic Church

There are a number of places of worship in Summer Hill. St Patrick's Catholic Church was built in 1874, and is the oldest known building in the suburb. There is also a small primary school associated with the church and located next to it. The building was originally a private home known as Kelvin Grove, and owned by Mrs Jane Drynan. Much of the exterior of the church is original but none of the internal walls were retained when the building was converted into a church. Following Drynan's death, Kelvin Grove was owned or leased by a succession of different people, including the Haberfield real-estate developer Richard Stanton, Croydon brick-maker William Downton, and two sisters named Freeman (one of whom was a nurse). In the 1920s and 1930s Kelvin Grove may have been used as a nursing home. The first mass was celebrated in Kelvin Grove on St Patrick's day 1946, giving the church its name.

St Andrew's Anglican Church has three distinctive internal transept arches, and was designed by a Presbyterian, Alexander Leckie Elphinstone Junior. The foundation stone was laid in 1883, and the top of the spire completed in 1906. The fast construction period, unusual for that time, was indicative of the area's affluence.

Recent Asian influences in Summer Hill have brought about the introduction of non-Christian places of worship. The Wong Tai Sin (or Kwan Yin Kur) temple is located on the corners of Kensington Road and Liverpool Road in a building that was a Masonic temple in the 1920s. The same building was converted into the current temple; the lower floor houses the Taoist deity of Wong Tai Sin, and the upper floor houses the Buddhist Bodhisattva of Kwan Yin.

== Schools ==
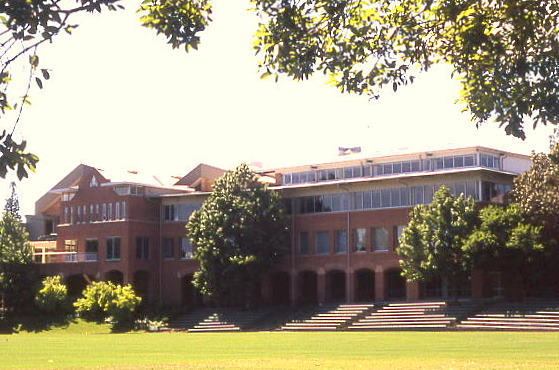
Trinity Grammar School

Trinity Grammar School on Prospect Road is a private school catering for boys from Pre-K to Year 12. The schools was founded in 1913, though the site has been in continuous use for education for 120 years from several different teaching institution. The headmaster's house was erected circa 1877.

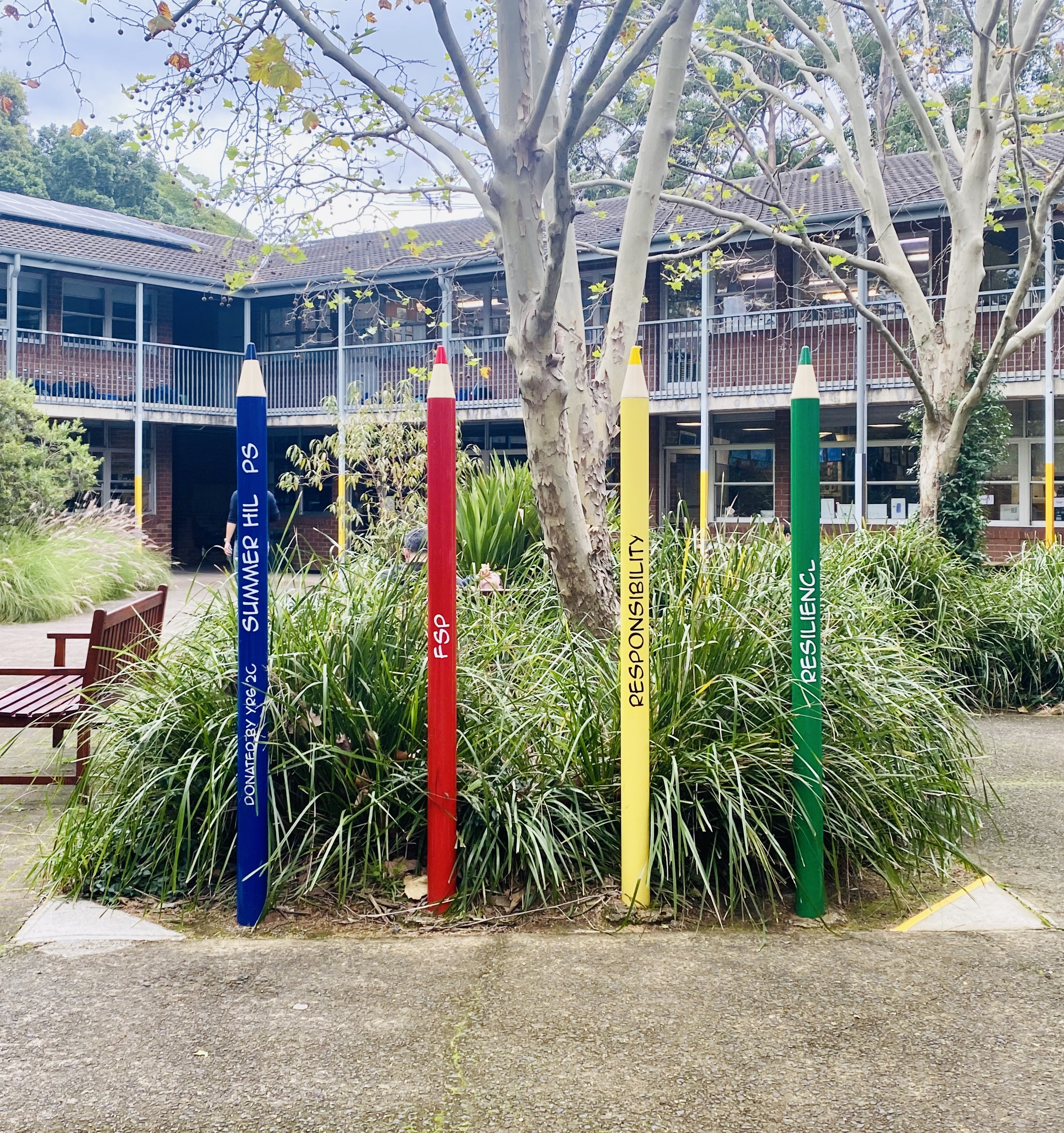
Summer Hill Public School

Summer Hill Public School, located on Moonbie Street, is a primary school that caters for students from Kindergarten to Year 6. It offers a selective program, known as Opportunity Classes, for Year 5 and 6 students under the New South Wales Government's Opportunity Class program. The school was established in 1883 in a wooden shed on 2 acres (8,100 m^{2}) of land that had been resumed from James Bartlett. The older buildings currently used at the school date back to 1913 while more modern buildings were constructed in 1977, 1998 and 2010. The school, designed in the Victorian Classical style, is listed on the Register of the National Estate.

Saint Patrick's Catholic Primary School, located on Drynan Street, is a co-educational K to Year 6 Catholic school. The school was founded in 1949 and is part of the Sydney Catholic Schools network.

== Commercial area ==
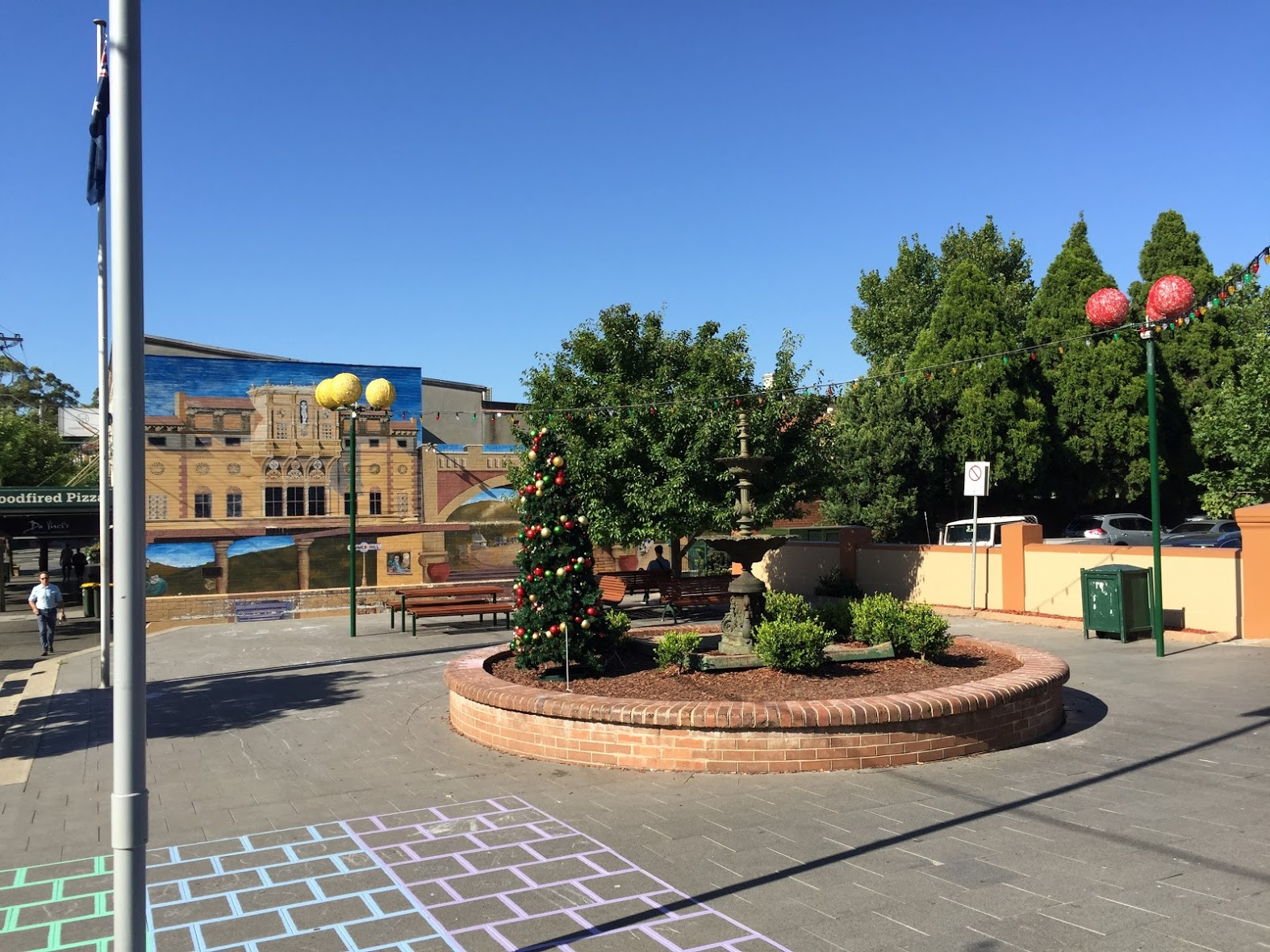
Summer Hill Square

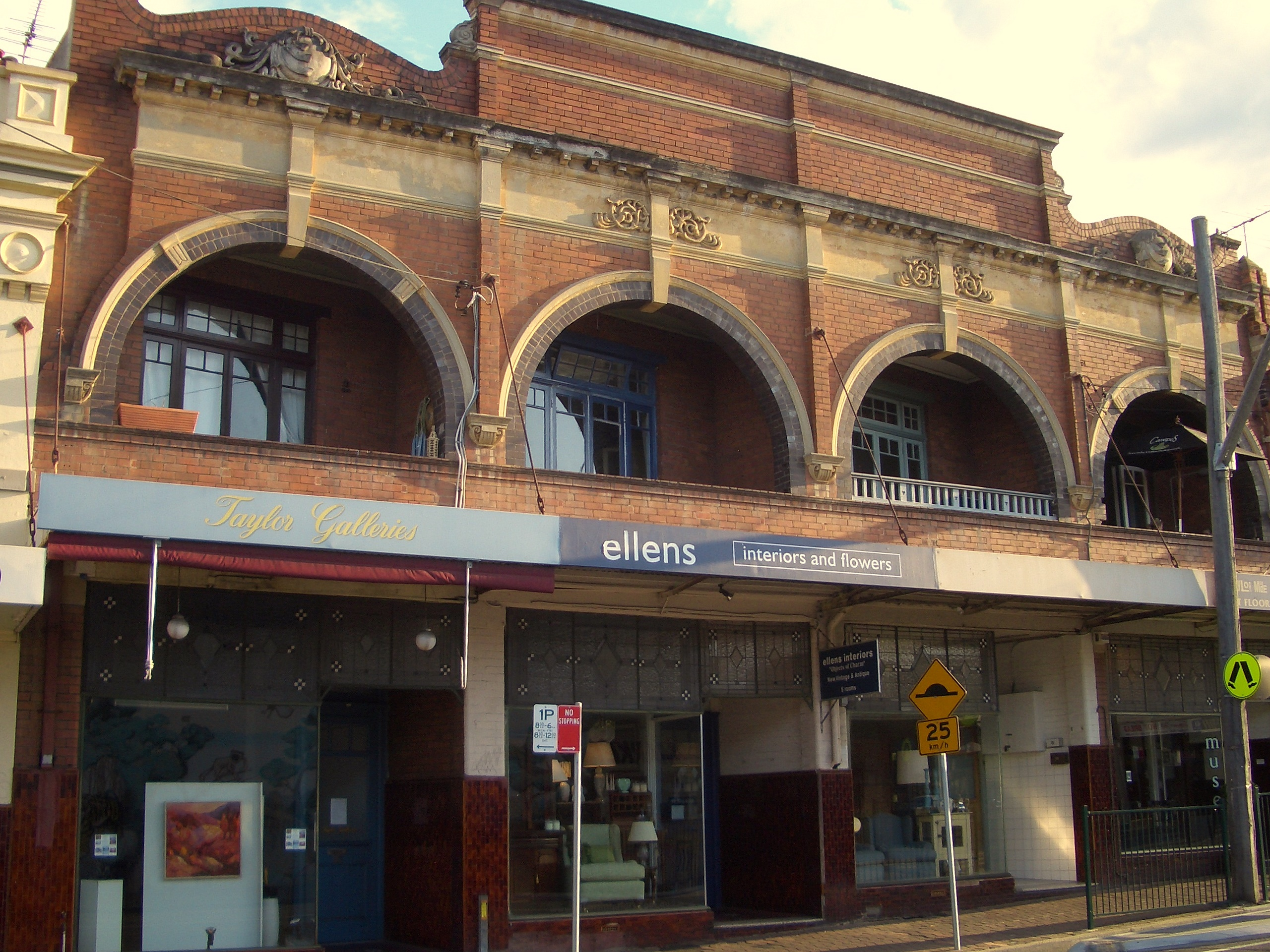
Smith Street shops

Summer Hill's shopping precinct is centred around a small town square with good pedestrian access, and is surrounded by cafés and restaurants along Lackey and Smith Streets. The suburb is very small by Australian standards, having a population of just over 7000, in an area of 110 hectares. It features some fine examples of architecture from the 19th and early 20th century.

The Summer Hill flour mill was built circa 1922, utilising the north–south goods railway line that was constructed during World War I. The silos were added from the 1950s onwards. The flour mill has been owned by various companies, including Mungo Scott, Allied Flour & Starch and Goodman Fielder, and then Allied Mills. In October 2007, the mills were sold to a developer, EG Funds Management, who have since redeveloped the mill site into a residential and commercial precinct. The precinct is a site for a regular community market for produce and artisan goods.

== Transport ==
Summer Hill is close to the main thoroughfares of Liverpool Road and Parramatta Road; although they are quite congested at peak times.

From 1915, Summer Hill was served by trams from Hurlstone Park. Trams left New Canterbury Road and went down Prospect Road, then swung right onto Smith Street. They turned onto Lackey Street, where they went right and terminated at the station. Low usage and rival buses saw the line closed in 1933, however some remains can be seen.

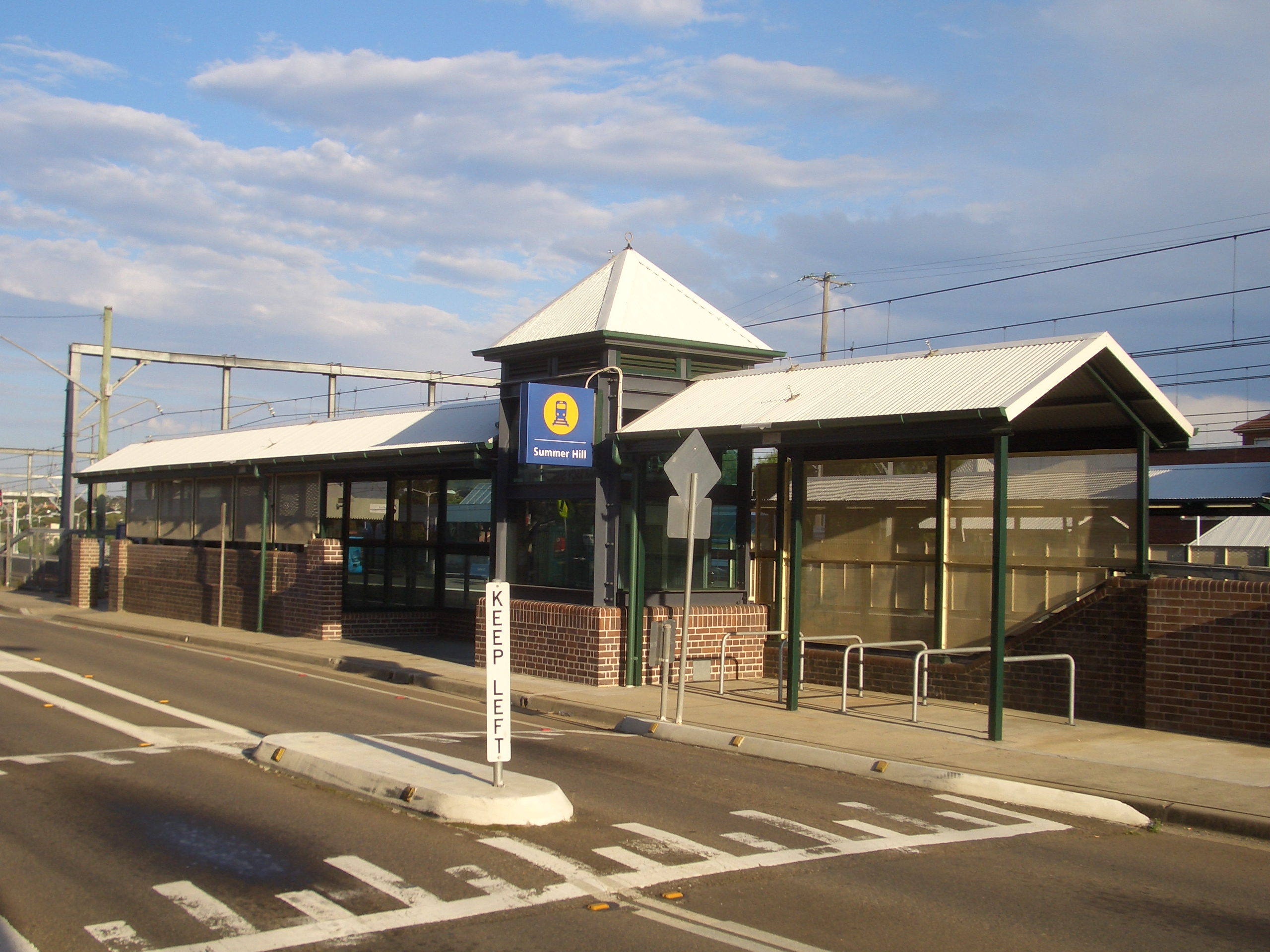
Summer Hill railway station, Grosvenor Crescent entrance

Summer Hill railway station is located on the Main Suburban railway line. The railway station was opened on 15 September 1879, and most of the local shops are clustered close to the station.

There are two stations serving Summer Hill on the Inner West Light Rail. These are - Lewisham West (adjacent to the former flour mill on the border with Lewisham) and Taverners Hill (near Parramatta Road). Access to the city is quicker by train, but the light rail may be used for some cross-regional journeys. It also interchanges with Dulwich Hill railway station on the Bankstown railway line.

There are four Transit Systems routes that service the area - the 480 and 483 follow routes along Parramatta Road and then Liverpool Road, the 461 travels along Parramatta Road and the 413 travels along Junction Road. Additionally, the N70, N71 and N80 NightRide buses on Parramatta Road run between Central and Penrith, Richmond and Hornsby respectively.

The area is also gradually becoming more bicycle friendly, with several bicycle paths in the suburb. The GreenWay is an active transport corridor that opened in December 2025 links the Cooks River to Iron Cove.

== Demographics ==
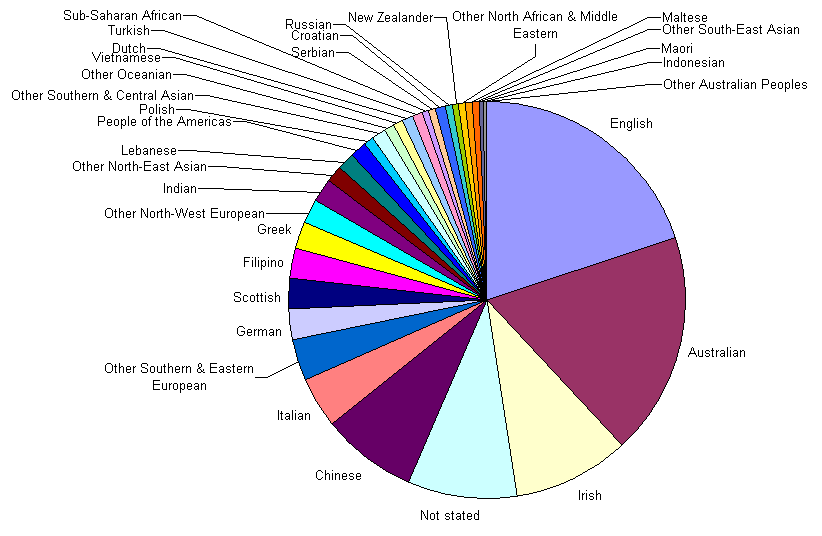
Ancestry as determined by birthplace of parents

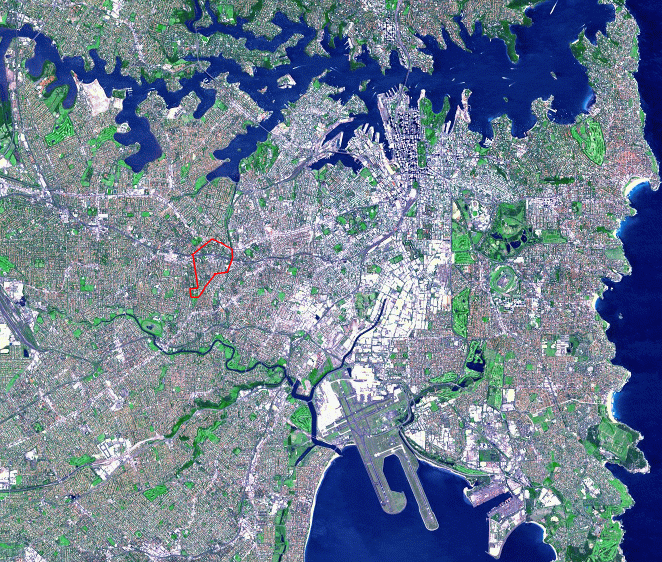
NASA image of Sydney's central business district and surrounds, with borders of Summer Hill shown in red.

In the 2021 census, the population of the Summer Hill was 7,288, in an area of 1.1 square kilometres. The population was 52.8% females, 47.2% males. 64.1% of people were born in Australia. The next most common countries of birth were China (3.7%), England (3.5%), New Zealand (1.9%), South Korea (1.6%) and Philippines (1.5%). 69.8% of people spoke only English at home. Other languages spoken at home included Mandarin 4.8%, Cantonese 1.9%, Korean 1.7%, Spanish 1.6% and Greek 1.5%. The most common responses for religion were No religion (52.8%), Catholic (18.6%), Anglican (5.7%), Not stated (5.3%) and Buddhism (2.8%). The majority of dwelling were flats, units or apartments (63.1%) followed by separate houses (19.6%) and semi-detached, terrace houses, or townhouses (17.0%).

== Notable residents ==
Notable people to have been born or lived in Summer Hill include:

- Normand Henry Baker (1908–1955), Archibald Prize winning artist.
- Robert Barbour, (1827–1895), politician.
- Dr John Belisario (1820–1900), dentist at the later end of the 19th century, recorded as living in Summer Hill in the 1891 census; first dentist in Australia to administer ether to a patient to carry out dental work.
- Colonel Matron Kathleen Best (1910–1957), first director of the Women's Australian Army Corps.
- Happy Hammond (1917–1998), radio host, television host, and producer.
- Ninian Melville Junior (1843–1897), local furniture maker and member of the NSW Parliament who also became Mayor of Newtown and later Ashfield.
- John Paton (1833–1914), winner of the Victoria Cross for bravery in India in 1857; a Summer Hill park is named after him.
- Arthur Streeton (1867–1943), Australian artist who briefly lived in Summer Hill.

== Politics ==
2023 state election (Note: Counting first-preference votes from Summer Hill Community Centre and Summer Hill Public School.)
Australian Labor Party (New South Wales Branch)	51.49%
The Greens NSW	31.49%
The Liberal Party of Australia, New South Wales Division	12.51%
Animal Justice Party	2.72%
Sustainable Australia Party - Stop Overdevelopment / Corruption	1.76%

2022 federal election (Note: Counting first-preference vote results for Summer Hill and Summer Hill South polling places.)
Labor	56.02%
The Greens	25.64%
Liberal	10.39%
Independent	1.94%
FUSION: Science, Pirate, Secular, Climate Emergency	1.42%
Pauline Hanson's One Nation	1.38%
United Australia Party	1.34%
Animal Justice Party	1.23%

Summer Hill is in the safe Labor federal electoral division of Grayndler. This seat has been held continuously by Labor (ALP) since the seat was created in 1949. It has been held by current member Anthony Albanese since 1996. Albanese held various ministerial appointments under the Rudd and Gillard governments, eventually becoming prime minister. During the 2010 federal election, Greens candidate former Marrickville Mayor Sam Byrne, received 45% of the vote in comparison to Albanese's 54%. At the 2013 election, Albanese received over 70% of the two party preferred vote, making it currently the ALP's safest seat in the country.

For NSW state elections, Summer Hill is in the Electoral district of Summer Hill, which was created in 2015. It is held by Jo Haylen of the Australian Labor Party.

== See also ==
- Trams in Sydney
