= George Edwards (actor) =

Australian actor and producer

- Born: Harold Parks; 11 March 1886; Kent Town, South Australia
- Died: 28 August 1953 (aged 67)
- Occupations: Actor; comedian; vaudevilllian; producer
- Spouses: Margaret Rose Wilson (married 1907–?); Molly D Hughes (married 1925–1933); Nell Stirling (married 1934–1948); Coral Lansbury (married 1953)

George Edwards (born Harold Parks, 11 March 1886 in Kent Town, South Australia; died 28 August 1953) was an Australian actor, comedian, vaudevillian and producer, known as The Man of a Thousand Voices.

== Biography ==
Edwards was a pioneer of Radio broadcasting in Australia, who was best known as a producer of radio serials. Prior to that he was a comedian, vaudeville artist, acrobatic dancer and stage performer. It is claimed that he changed his name from Harold Parks to George Edwards at the behest of Edward Branscombe, who was putting together an up-market act and did not want anyone associated with low-brow music hall, and that he took the name from English theatrical impresario George Edwards. He performed in a radio drama adaption of Robert Louis Stevenson's Dr. Jekyll and Mr. Hyde.

Edwards' first wife was Margaret Rose Wilson, whom he married on 6 August 1907. They had a daughter.

On 9 May 1925, he married Molly D. Hughes in Sydney, and in 1929 was a featured entertainer on the Sydney Show Boat. They divorced in 1933.

His third wife was Helen Dorothy Malmgrom (born 22 August 1909), who had worked with him on the Sydney Showboat. She changed her name to Nell Stirling. They were married in Haberfield on 29 March 1934. Together they appeared in many live radio productions, including the long-running Dad and Dave from Snake Gully series in which Edwards played Dad (and many other roles), and Stirling played Mabel (Dave's wife). Sumner Locke Elliott wrote a number of radio plays for Edward's company.

Nell had a daughter from her first marriage, and one with Edwards, born in April 1941.

Edwards and Stirling were divorced in July 1948, and on 9 November she married her accountant, Alexander George Atwill. Nell died of an accidental overdose of carbitral capsules on 10 November 1951 at her Vaucluse home.

Edwards married once more. His fourth wife was Coral Lansbury, a noted feminist who had worked as a radio scriptwriter and actor and was a distant cousin of English-American actress Angela Lansbury, producer Edgar Lansbury and Bruce Lansbury. The couple married on 20 February 1953 at the Registrar-General's office in Sydney but Edwards died six months later on 28 August at the Scottish Hospital in Paddington. Lansbury soon afterwards married Bruce Bligh Turnbull, and in October 1954 gave birth to their son Malcolm Turnbull, who went on to become the 29th Prime Minister of Australia. She later become a notable English literature academic.

== Select credits ==
=== As actor ===
- Satan in Sydney (1918) – feature film
- The Dingo (1923) – feature film
- Townies and Hayseeds (1923) – feature film
- The Haunted Barn (1931) – short film

=== As producer ===
- It's Never Too Late to Mend (1936)
- Crazy Family (1939) – also actor
- Tradesman's Entrance (1941) – serial
- Grand City (1942) – serial
- Black Ivory (1945) - serial
- The Search for the Golden Boomerang – serial
- Black Lightning – radio serial
- The Harp in the South – radio serial
