= Hazel de Berg =

Australian oral history pioneer

Hazel de Berg MBE
- de Berg in 1961
- Born: Hazel Estelle Holland; 21 March 1913; Deniliquin, New South Wales, Australia
- Died: 3 February 1984 (aged 70); Sydney, Australia
- Education: Methodist Ladies College
- Occupation: Oral historian
- Known for: Interviews with prominent figures including writers, artists, historians, artist, musicians and scientists and others.

Hazel Estelle de Berg MBE (née Holland; 21 March 1913 – 3 February 1984) was an Australian pioneering oral historian and broadcaster who conducted recordings locally and abroad including the United Kingdom and United States. De Berg recorded her collections exclusively for the National Library of Australia between 1957 and 1984, producing 1291 hour-long sound tape reels of interviews with subjects that were prominent or becoming prominent in their respective industries. Her interviewees mostly included writers and artists, in addition to a smaller group of historians, musicians, directors, actors, scientists and architects, as well as a selected group of politicians, public servants, journalists and churchmen. De Berg also photographed each of her subjects.

== Biography ==
Hazel Estelle de Berg was born on 21 March 1913 in Deniliquin, New South Wales to George Robert Holland and Ann Holland (née McIntosh). Her father was a Methodist minister, whose pastoral work led to the family moving around country New South Wales during de Berg's childhood, living in Cessnock, Cobar, Orange and Kempsey. In 1928 the family moved to Sydney, where de Berg enrolled at Methodist Ladies’ College, Burwood and completed her Leaving Certificate in 1932. She then trained as a photographer at Paramount Studios and until 1938 worked in the studio of Noel Rubie, while continuing to live at home with her parents.

== Career ==
According to David Foster, de Berg's introduction to tape recording was a 1957 commission by Ken Bruce, founder of Talking Books for the Blind in New South Wales, and himself blind, to read, on tape, the 1951 A Man Called Peter. Later that year, de Berg was asked by historian Frank Clune to record a book for a blind friend. An amateur, using an Australian-made Nova reel-to-reel tape machine, she recorded Dame Mary Gilmore's Old Day, Old Ways. She subsequently recorded an interview with Dame Mary for background information and the recording became the first of the de Berg oral history collection, held at the National Library of Australia in Canberra. She proved undaunted by the fame or high standing of her subjects. At a meeting in October 1958 of the Book Collectors' Society of Australia at the Public Library of New South Wales, de Berg played some of her recordings, of Dame Mary Gilmore, Frank Dalby Davison and others addressing their personal messages to the blind. In a 1973 unpublished paper de Berg wrote that:

"I have come a little way along the road a blind man showed me — a road I hope someone else treads in the centuries ahead — but I have come a long way in love, and perhaps knowledge, for the people who express our country."

De Berg had no special connections in Australian literature apart from being a distant cousin of poet David Campbell, though in a 1956 ABC radio feature My Friend Keats for the 'Poets Corner' program, she relates how, from childhood, she enjoyed the poet whose On First Looking into Chapman's Homer, Ode to a Nightingale, Ode on a Grecian Urn, and his I Had a Dove and the Sweet Dove Died were dear to her. On 13 March 1960, an edition of the Australian Broadcasting Commission's radio program 'Quality Street' was produced by John Thompson from Hazel de Berg's recordings of South Australian poets. By 1961 she had tapes of all sixty-eight living recognised Australian poets reading their own verse.

De Berg did not intrude her own voice in any of her recordings nor her questions, but let her subject speak for themselves. She also photographed each of her interviewees, funding that, travel to capital cities, and the recording out of her own pocket, until in 1960 she was granted £100 from the Commonwealth Literary Fund after presenting her work at the Adelaide Festival, and for donating the tapes to the National Library of Australia was provided a further Commonwealth Literary Grant by Sir Harold White, the Federal Parliamentary Librarian and National Librarian. This encouraged her venture to bridge history by compiling a forty-five minute tape of people who had personally known Henry Lawson, who had died in 1922.

The 1963 annual National Library report to Parliament notes that "Further recordings have also been made by Mrs. Hazel de Berg, this time of Australian artists discussing their work." Though rarely passing her opinions on her subjects, The Bulletin in 1964 did obtain this comparison of artists and writers; "The artists are right out in front. They're more sophisticated and up to date than the writers. Our poets are wonderful, but a lot of the fiction writers tend to write backwards towards what is familiar and old-time. It's not us they're writing about."

In 1972 de Berg transferred the rights in her tapes to the National Library which made her its Oral History Consultant under contract, was paid an annual grant and the library funded the transcriptions, a more easily searched format useful to historians. She continued to select interviewees herself and to do the background research. Poet John Thompson, who was employed by the Australian Broadcasting Commission, edited and processed her recordings. She travelled to every state, and de Berg also interviewed expatriate Australians in London and New York. By 1973 she had made over 700 recordings of 787 people, and the tapes were being converted to phonograph records for preservation.

== The interviews ==
The recordings vary both in length and form depending on the subject, and became longer as de Berg's recording technique developed; while the early tapes each contain five or six interviews, that extended to three or four tapes for one. De Berg's standard interview, especially with artists and writers, begins with the subject sketching a short autobiography for which she is particularly interested in their childhood influences and their earliest impulse to begin painting or writing. The interviewee then describes their creative methodology including, the influence on the work of their own experiences, and the need for revision. A particular book or painting is discussed in detail; its inspiration and ideas, and problems encountered in its completion. In conclusion, the interviewee may outline their general philosophy or discuss the state of the arts in Australia. All questions, pauses, broken sentences or repetitions have been edited out to give the impression of an uninterrupted reflective monologue. Given that some contain material that is frank, or potentially libellous, those have restricted access.

Among them John Bell speaks of a desire to found a permanent Shakespearean company; Colleen McCullough is interviewed just as her bestselling novel The Thorn Birds was published and reveals how scientific training develops a "first class brain and absolutely phenomenal memory;" David Williamson tells how his interest in language as an instrument of power informed the construction of his protagonists' relationships; Howard Florey was recorded the year before his death and explains how his work was driven by curiosity, not as a mission to save humankind; and Barry Humphries discusses how theatre became his favoured means of self-expression over painting in his university years.

== Reception ==
The National Library in its 1961–62 annual report noted her contribution;

An unusual addition to the growing National Library collections illustrating the life and work of our creative writers is a record which also illustrates the co-operative attitude of Australian writers and the initiative of an Australian woman. Mrs. Hazel de Berg has recorded our leading authors reading their own work and recalling their experiences. The National Library, the Australian Broadcasting Commission and the authors have together made copies available for broadcasting and for use in educational institutions.

When publisher Angus & Robertson launched six books of poetry together at a spring event in 1961, they included De Berg as an invitee among critics Leonie Kramer and Nancy Keesing, academics Cecil Hadgraft and Eunice Hanger, journalist Ross Campbell and poets Ronald McCuaig, Elizabeth Riddell, A. D. Hope, R. D. Fitzgerald, Douglas Stewart, Kenneth Slessor, John Thompson, Vivian Smith and Charles Higham. In 1967 the Library reported on further progress;

"The steady progress of Mrs. Hazel de Berg's series of tape recordings and its extension from creative writers and artists to other notable Australians has brought the total number of reels to 254 and those recorded to nearly 500. A tribute to her sensitivity and the cooperation of those who have been recorded, this project has created an exceptionally rich biographical source for the future."

In 1974 Graeme Powell declared that;

The de Berg collection is by far the largest and the most important oral history collection in Australia and can be ranked with the great collections in America. It is particularly impressive in that for many years Mrs. de Berg built up the collection with almost no assistance and even today it remains a very personal collection.

and of de Berg herself he wrote;

Mrs. de Berg is a woman of great charm whose enthusiasm for oral history is undiminished after seventeen years [to 1974] of interviewing. She is also exceptionally determined and patient and her persuasive powers have finally overcome the hesitancy of a number of men whose shyness or irascibility was notorious.

David Foster, in his book Self Portraits based on the recordings and released through the Library's distributor, Allen & Unwin, in June 1991, notes that in 1970 bibliographer and librarian Pauline Fanning, in her commentary on the collection, remarked that de Berg was not herself a scholar of literature so "is not sufficiently well informed to know what questions to ask, and furthermore, she has so edited the tapes as to eliminate the questions she asks. This results in the recording being in monologue form, with no indication as to why or how the person interviewed was prompted to speak on a particular topic." In response Foster argues that de Berg's "idiosyncratic approach in fact creates rather fewer difficulties with writers than with politicians [...] since writers may be judged by what they have said and written, and perhaps ought to be, it does little harm, I believe, to let them ramble on to their hearts' content, as a great many of them did."

De Berg's interviews continue to be cited in books, book chapters, papers, theses and journals.

== Personal ==
De Berg converted to Judaism and in 1941 married Woolf (William) de Berg, a Lithuanian-born businessman and later presented her work to the Women's International Zionist Organisation (WIZO) state council. For more than ten years she dedicated herself to raising their children. During the last months of her life, her daughter Diana Ritch assisted with the recordings before de Berg died at home in Sydney on 3 February 1984. Her twin daughters and son, and several grandchildren, survived her. Her husband William had predeceased her in 1981.

== Honours ==
In the 1968 New Year's Honours, de Berg was appointed a Member of the Order of the British Empire for "service to the collection of archival material".

== Legacy ==
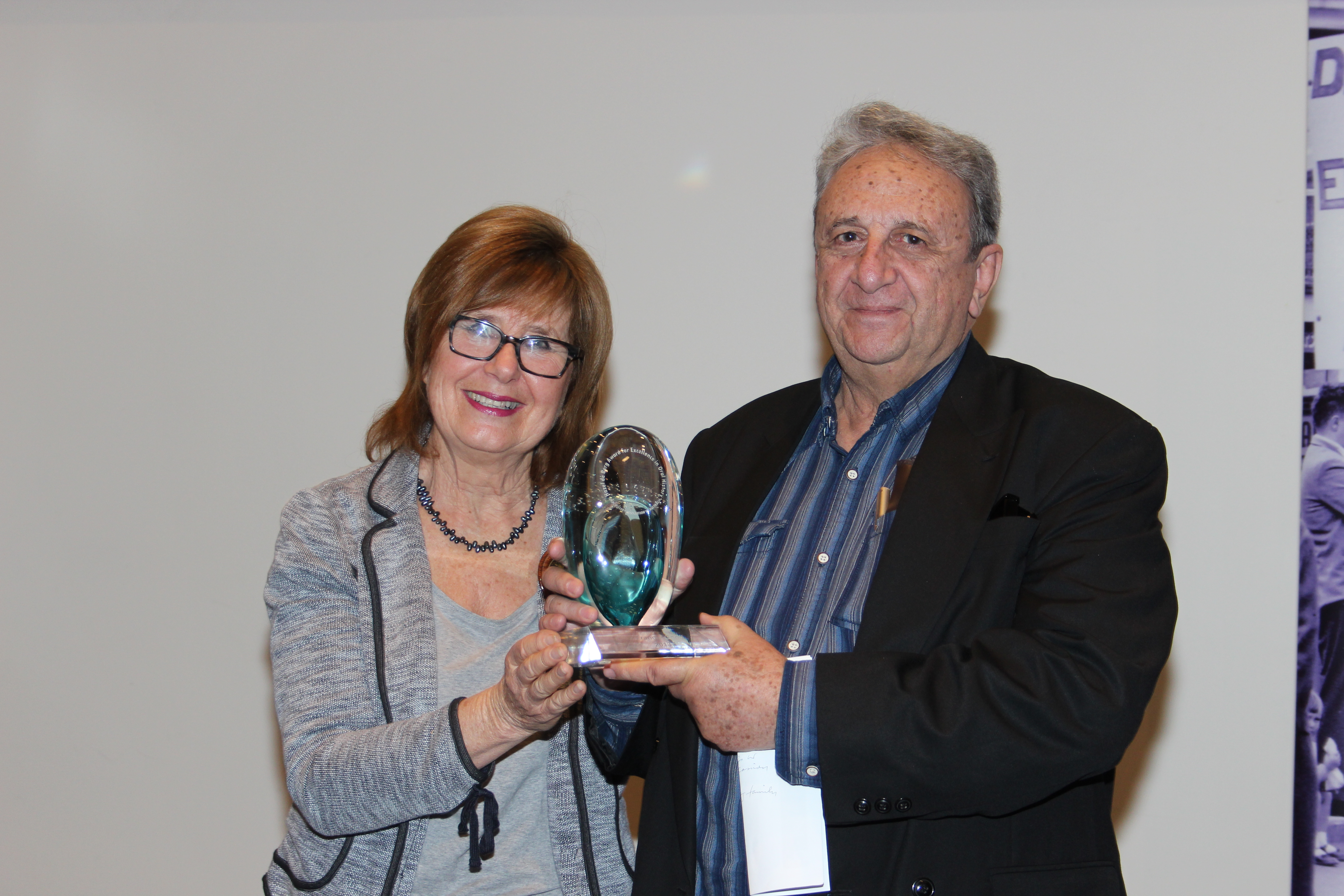
The Hazel de Berg Award for Excellence in Oral History was awarded by her daughter, Diana Ritch, to Francis Good in 2013

De Berg's collection of sound tape reels of interviews with writers, historians, artists, musicians and scientists such as Peter Sculthorpe, A. P. Elkin, Manning Clark, H. C. Coombs, Howard Florey, Jack Lang and Cardinal Norman Gilroy, is held by the National Library of Australia whose pioneering role as Australia's main collector and preserver of oral history (with more than 44,000 recordings by 1990) was initiated by de Berg's early efforts and Harold White's interest in the medium, and was a project that State Libraries have since followed.

Though men outnumber women in de Berg's recordings, ANU academic Barry York notes that it is a distinction of de Berg's collection that her subjects include so many Australian women, among them being Barbara Blackman who also recorded interviews, with artists in her case, Anne Summers, Bronwyn Yeates, Cheryl Adamson, Clair Isbister, Dulcie Deamer, Dulcie Holland, Elizabeth Durack, Elizabeth Guy, Elizabeth Harrower, Elizabeth Riddell, Enid Conley, Essie Coffey, Esther Paterson, Gwen Harwood, H. F. Brinsmead, Heather George, Helen Garner, May Gibbs, Hilda Abbott, Irene Greenwood, Jean Skuse, Jessie Scotford, Jessie Street, Jill Hellyer, Dorothea Mackellar, Joan Phipson, Judy Cassab, Kath Walker, Kathleen O'Connor, Kylie Tennant, Lorna Hayter, Maie Casey, Margaret Curtis-Otter, Marjorie Pizer, Miriam Hyde, Nancy Cato, Nancy Keesing, Nancy Robinson, Nerida Goodman, Ninette Dutton, Patsy Adam-Smith, Ruby Rich, Stroma Buttrose, Thelma Bate, Thelma Clune, Vicki Viidikas, and Vida Lahey.

In 1989 a directory of her work, The Hazel de Berg Recordings: From the Oral History Collection of the National Library of Australia, was published. In reviewing it, Barry York called it a "unique and invaluable oral history source" for "Australian researchers, librarians, broadcasters, teachers, students and writers."

The de Berg tapes have been the source material for biographers;

- In 1991 David Foster selected and introduced Self-portraits a book of fifteen of the recordings de Berg made of writers; Wilfred Burchett, David Campbell, Ross Campbell, Maie Casey, Charmian Clift, Laurence Collinson, Ion Idriess, Jim McNeil, Stephen Murray-Smith, Grace Perry, Evadne Price, Rohan Rivett, Colin Simpson, John Thompson, and Alan Villiers.
- Geoffrey Dutton's 1992 book Artists' Portraits consists of transcripts of 26 of de Berg's interviews, mostly from the 1960s and includes her photograph of each artist; Kathleen O'Connor, Thea Proctor, Vida Lahey, Roland Wakelin, William Frater, Ian Fairweather, Adelaide Perry, Grace Cossington Smith, Weaver Hawkins, Daphne Mayo, Lloyd Rees, Alison Rehfisch, Treania Smith, Douglas Annand, Constance Stokes, Margo Lewers, William Pidgeon, Michael Kmit, Russell Drysdale, Noel Counihan, Donald Friend, Francis Lymburner, David Strachan, Jon Molvig, Clifton Pugh and George Baldessin.
- In 2020 the National Portrait Gallery in collaboration with the National Library of Australia developed a gallery audio tour, In their own words from de Berg's oral history recordings, which as of 2023 remains available online.

The biannual Hazel de Berg Award for oral history was established in her memory by the De Berg family for Oral History Australia and was first presented in 2006.
