= Valda Aveling =

Australian musician (1920–2007)

Valda Rose Aveling
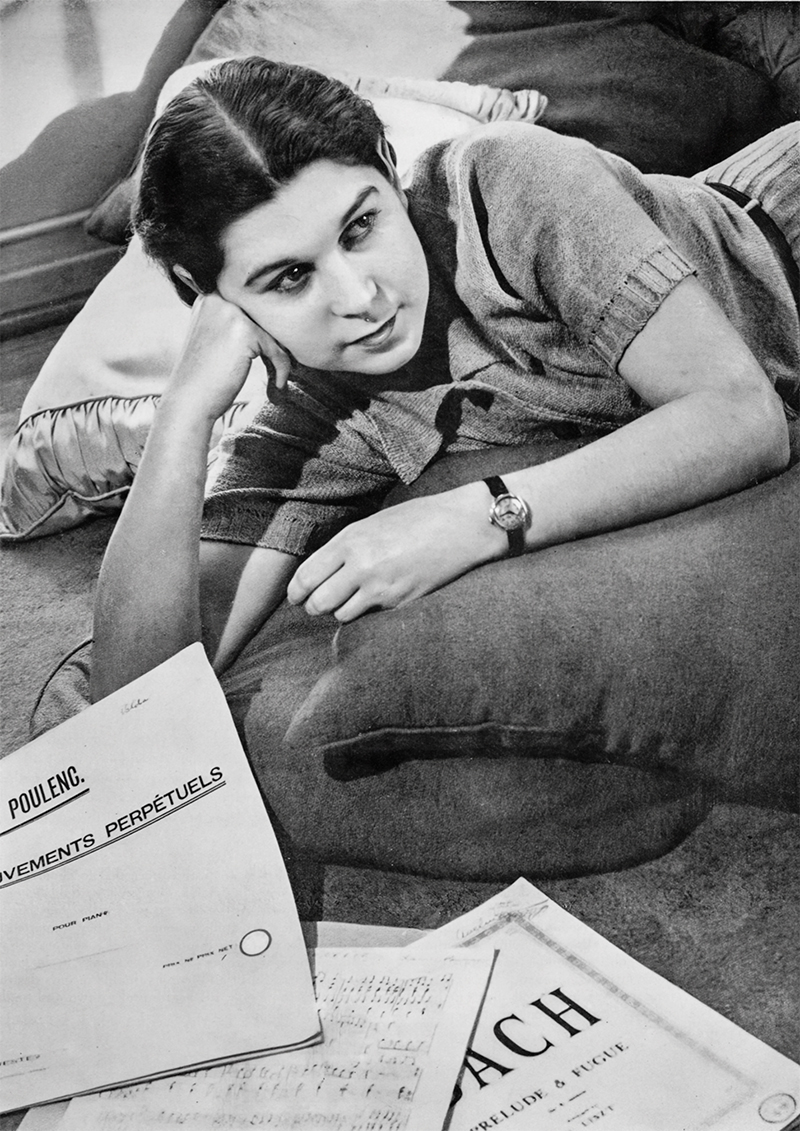
- Aveling in 'The Home' magazine August 1938. Photograph: Noel Rubie
- Born: 16 May 1920; Sydney, Australia
- Died: 21 November 2007 (aged 87)
- Occupations: pianist, harpsichordist and clavichordist

Valda Rose Aveling OBE (16 May 1920 – 21 November 2007) was an Australian pianist, harpsichordist and clavichordist. Her repertoire was very wide, including composers as diverse as William Byrd, Jan Sweelinck, Sergei Rachmaninoff and Béla Bartók.

== Education ==
Valda Aveling was born in Sydney, the youngest of four girls and a boy, and showed great talent at an early age. At 16 she received teaching and performing diplomas from the NSW Conservatorium of Music, held the Layman Martin Harrison Scholarship over 1933–35, and performed in the Sydney Eisteddfod in 1935 where she won the Sydney Eisteddfod Australian Women's Weekly 100-pound pianoforte scholarship for the most talented juvenile pianist.

== Reception ==
A Sydney Morning Herald review of her performance at the Conservatorium on 31 April 1936 noted "the enthusiasm of a large audience. The Bach Suite, with which she opened, was notable for its clarity; and Schumann's Sonata In G Minor found the young artist capable of the requisite power and virility. She was equally convincing in Cesar Franck's prelude and variations. The prelude by Frank Hutchins (her teacher) received its first performance at this recital, and proved to be an inspiring piece of work. The programme closed with the Debussy suite".

== Touring artist ==
Aveling then left for Britain to study harpsichord and clavichord with Violet Gordon-Woodhouse, and there made several recordings. She returned in 1938 to make her piano debut under Malcolm Sargent, at the Sydney Town Hall. In one concert in Manila, she played Tchaikovsky's Piano Concerto No. 1, Rachmaninoff's Piano Concerto No. 2 and Beethoven's Emperor Concerto. She later came to dislike Beethoven's music, saying there was "nothing light in it".

Aveling toured Germany, Belgium and France with Marjorie Lawrence in 1945 after the end of WW2. In 1947, from 22 April to 12 April she toured Perth, Adelaide, Hobart (playing Grieg's Concerto in A Minor), Launceston, Brisbane, Toowoomba, Canberra, Newcastle, Sydney, Melbourne, Albury, Ballarat, and Bendigo for the Australian Broadcasting Commission but returned to Britain by the early 1950s. For the next 30 years, she appeared at major British festivals such as the Proms and throughout the Far East, Europe and North America.

She played Bach concertos for two, three or four keyboards, with players such as George Malcolm, Simon Preston, Eileen Joyce and Geoffrey Parsons, and conductors such as Yehudi Menuhin. She gave a number of premieres, including those of works by Stephen Dodgson and Dame Elizabeth Maconchy.

Active as a harpsichordist before the emergence of the early music movement and commissioned works for the instrument from living composers, Aveling was the first to give amplified recitals on the clavichord.

== Students and collaborators ==
Aveling taught at Trinity College of Music, London, and made numerous recordings. Among her notable pupils was pianist Howard Brown.

Among the artists with whom she collaborated were Benjamin Britten, Dame Joan Sutherland, Richard Bonynge, Evelyn Rothwell, Luciano Pavarotti, Leontyne Price, Dame Kiri Te Kanawa and Renata Tebaldi.

== Award ==
In 1982, Aveling was appointed an Officer of the Order of the British Empire (OBE).

== Personal life ==
Valda Aveling never married. She lived the last ten years of her life being cared for by friends and tending her garden, which contained a large eucalyptus tree imported from Australia. She died at the age of 87.

== Sources ==
- Obituary, The Age, 27 December 2007, p. 18
