= Margaret Doyle =

Margaret Doyle or Maggie Doyle may refer to:

- Margaret Kennedy (singer) born Margaret Doyle
- Margaret Doyle (announcer) (1920-2002), Australian announcer

== Fictional characters ==
- Margaret 'Maggie' Doyle a fictional character in Australian police show Blue Heelers between 1994 and 2000
- Maggie Doyle, a character in the American hospital series ER
