= Noel Rubie =

Australian photographer, painter, playwright

Alfred Noel Joseph Rubie (25 December 1901 – 13 July 1975) was an Australian modernist painter, portrait and commercial photographer, playwright and pharmacy proprietor who worked in Sydney during the 1920s and into the 1960s.

== Early life ==
Noel Rubie was born on Christmas Day 1901, one five children of Annie Maria (née Cooper) and James Joseph Rubie in Newtown, New South Wales.

== Career ==
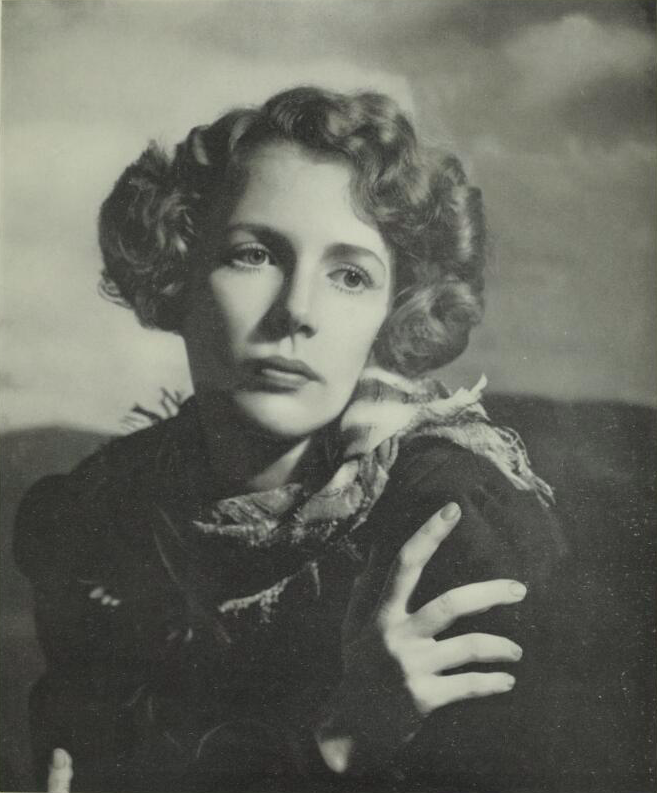
Portrait of Heather George by Noel Rubie, published in the July 1938 edition of The Home: An Australian Quarterly

Rubie pursued interests in a number of enterprises. Commencing the exhibition of his paintings from 1929, Rubie simultaneously set up with Jack E. Turner at 10 Bligh St., Corydon as a commercial artist in business from November 1930; a magazine article indicates that he may have been undertaking studies in design in 1934 while in May he commenced cosmetic manufacture with Jessica Harcourt, before Hazel Holland (de Berg) became his partner in his photography studio at 2 Belmore Rd., Randwick from December 1936. Heather George also worked with him. At the same time he established the Wynyard Pharmacy, on the Ramp at Wynyard Station with Arthur H. Dowse, which he renamed the ‘Wynyard Drug Store’ the following January.

He retired from his partnership with Hazel on 12 October 1938, having set up Rubie, Noel, Pty., Ltd. industrial and commercial photographers with directors Arthur H. Dowse, Edwin Paterson and Ella M. Hamilton, only days before, with a capital of £2000 in £1 shares. Rubie next established Kendal Crawford Laboratories, manufacturers and distributors of chemicals and cosmetics in May 1940, and Roto Displays in April 1941, then, with Arthur Dowse and Reginald Perier, started a film company “Perier Productions” incorporated in Noel Rubie Pty. Ltd’, in March 1947, after the War. The photographic business prospered and increased its staffing between 1936 and particularly during 1950.

Noel Rubie Pty. Ltd was dissolved by default under the Companies Act of 1961 on 19 August 1967.

== Painter ==
From 1929 Rubie showed with the Royal Art Society of New South Wales, and the Australian Art Society, and was a finalist for the Archibald Prize with a portrait, now held in the Art Gallery of New South Wales, of Walter Collett Shoppee, son of a Ballarat gold-miner and veteran of the Crimean War and the ‘Indian Mutiny’.

His painting style aligned with that of other early modernists in Australia and, though of modest standing, is comparable to the work of artists such as Grace Cossington Smith, Roy De Maistre, and Roland Wakelin. He exhibited with Ronald H. Steuart, Harold Abbott and Donald Friend.

Rubie's paintings and photographs are represented in the National Portrait Gallery, The National Library of Australia, the State Library of Victoria and the Museum of Applied Arts and Sciences. He first exhibited at Grosvenor Galleries in 1936 with reviews in The Sydney Morning Herald and with two of his male portraits These Yellow Sands and Not Amused illustrated in the November Art In Australia.

== Photographer ==
Rubie provided stylish society portraits, mainly of young women but also of established personalities for The Home: an Australian quarterly until the beginning of WW2 and then The Bulletin into the 1950s. Significant among these subjects were Lesley Pope (later Hazlitt) of The Piddingtons; actor Joy Youlden from the J. C. Williamson production of The Girl Friend; Margaret Doyle, first woman newsreader and national radio announcer in Australia; journalist Robin Dalton (née Eakin); and cellist Lois Simpson. An indication of the cost of sitting for a Noel Rubie portrait may be gauged from a wartime Legacy radio auction to which he contributed the offer of a portrait, giving a value of 3 guineas (A$239.80 2022 equivalent). He presented a workshop on lighting and portraiture at his studio for the YMCA Camera Circle in 1947.

His portrait subjects also included actors Ed Devereaux and Queenie Ashton, radio personality Jack Davey and announcer Margaret Doyle, politician Hon. Eric John Harrison, soprano Kirsten Flagstad, contralto Essie Ackland, actress and costume designer Thelma Afford, physician Captain Gwen Lusby, pianist Valda Aveling, dancers Eileen Kramer, Maria Azrova, Sono Osato, Hélène Kirsova and Roman Jasinski.

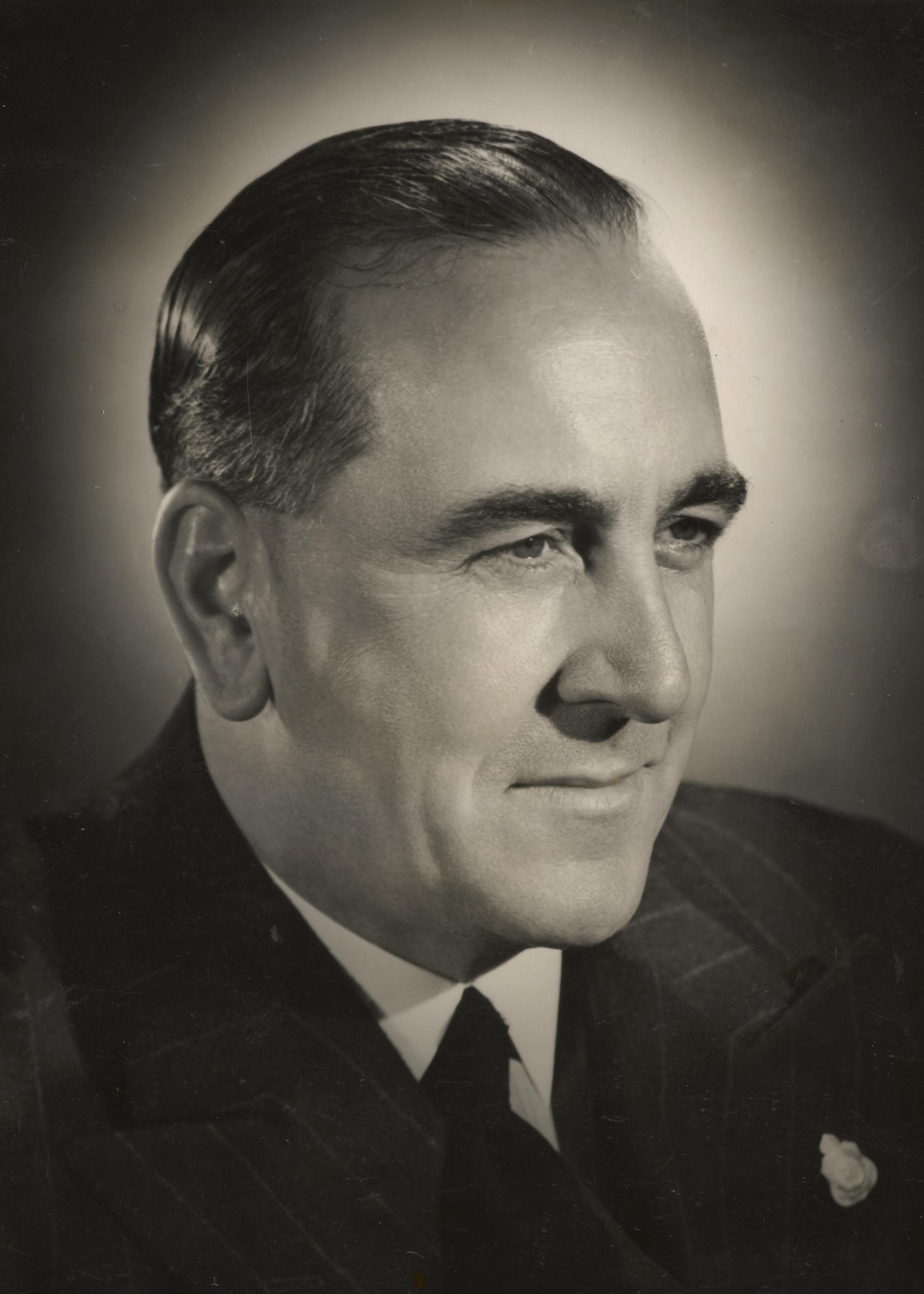
Portrait of the Hon. Eric John Harrison, 1949

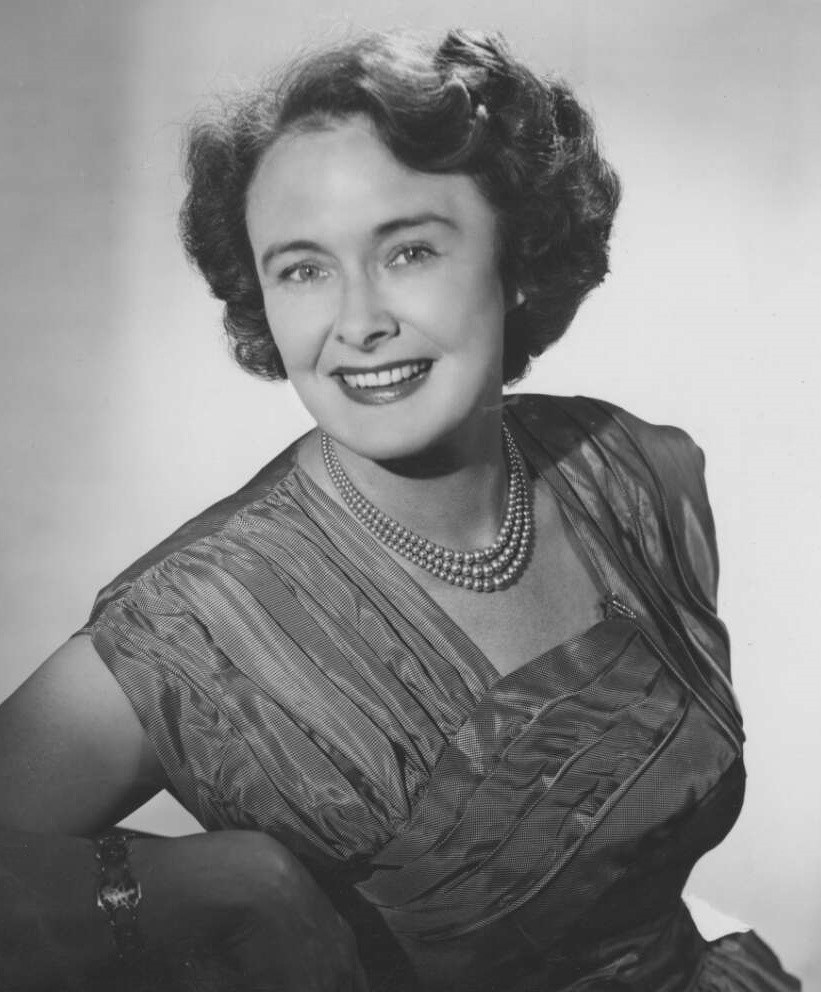
Queenie Ashton, 1950

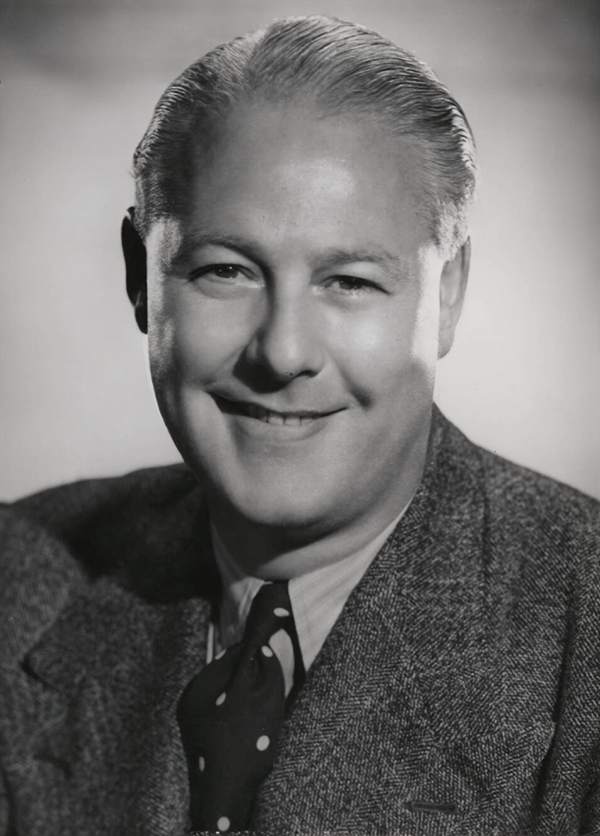
Jack Davey, radio personality, 1946

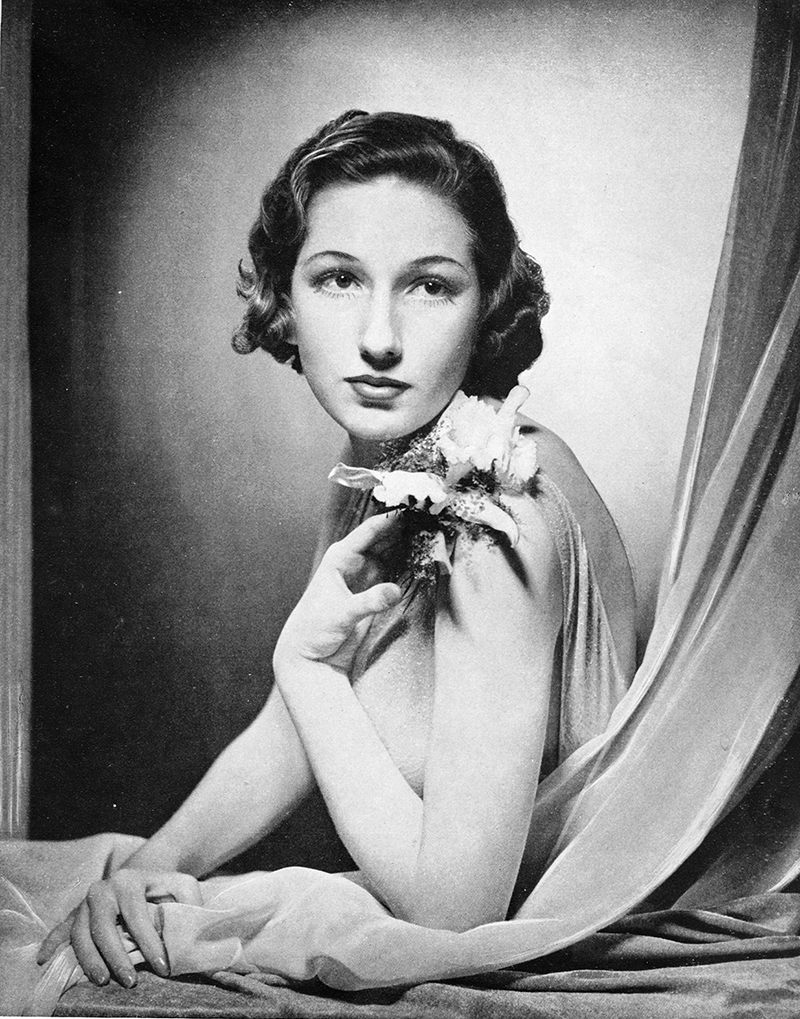
Robin Dalton (née Eakin) 1938

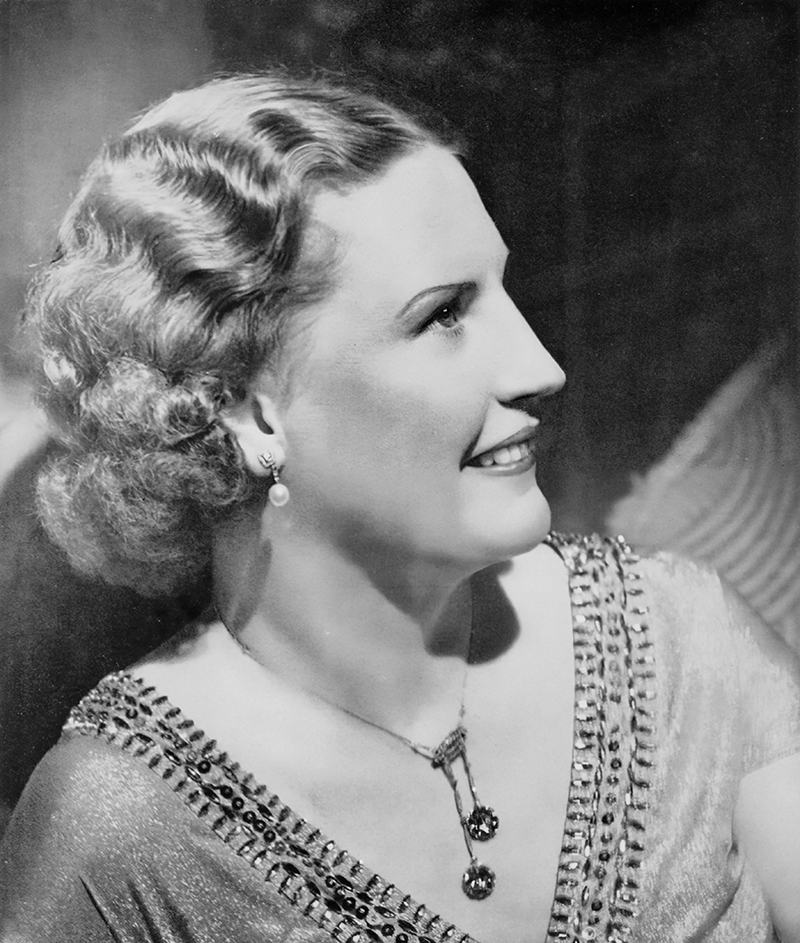
Madame Kirsten Flagstad Norwegian soprano, 1938

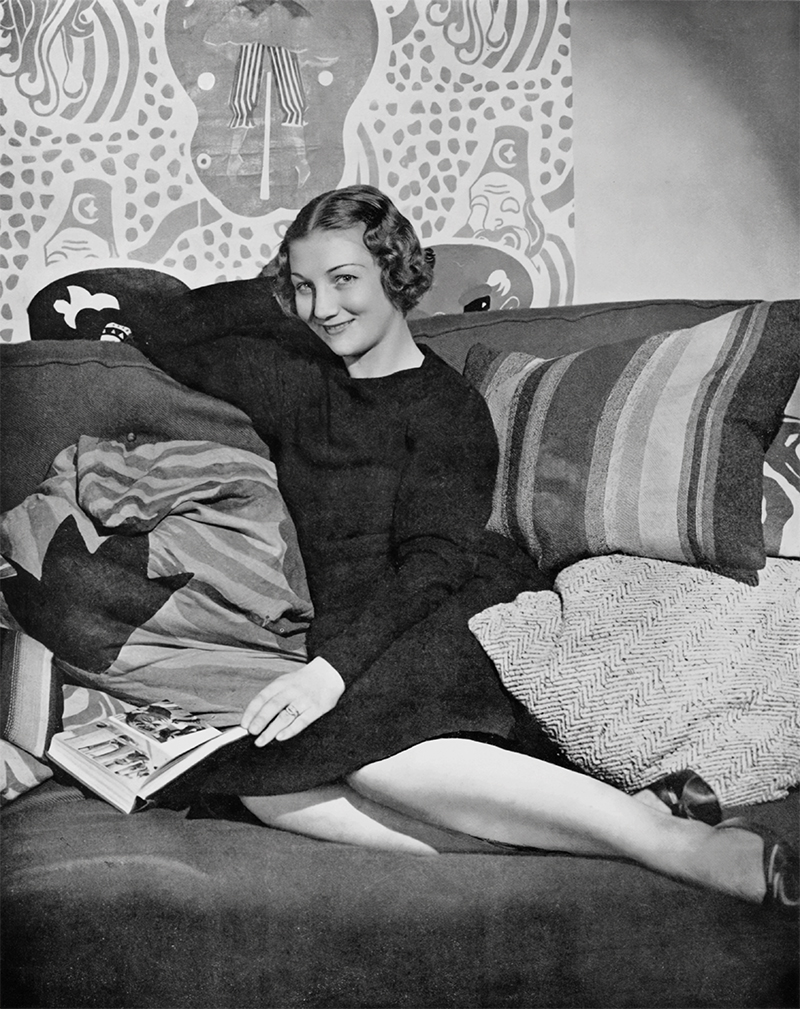
Hélène Kirsova in 'The Home" magazine, 1938

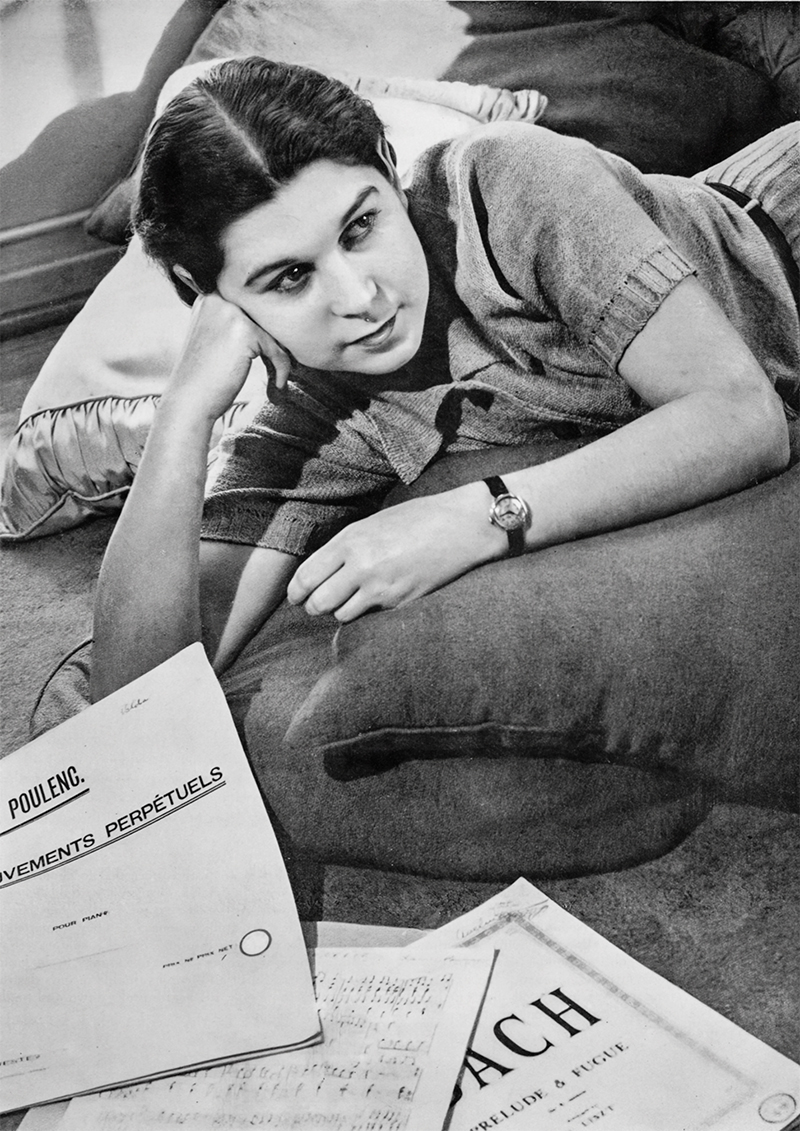
Valda Aveling, 1938

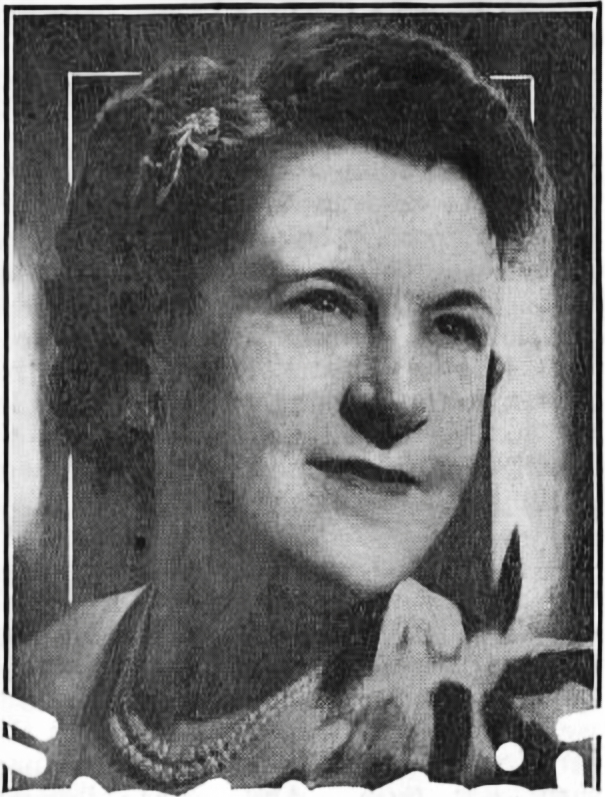
Essie Ackland, 1948

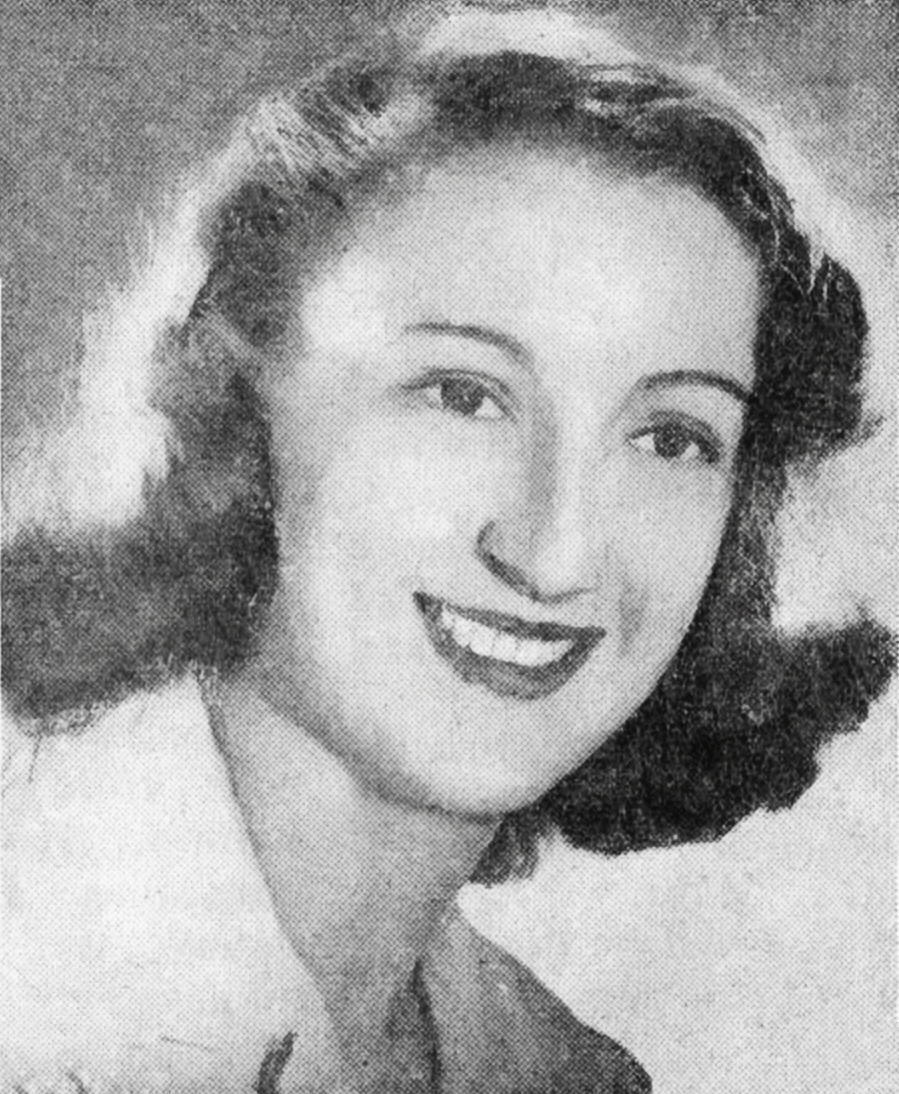
Madge Ryan in 1948

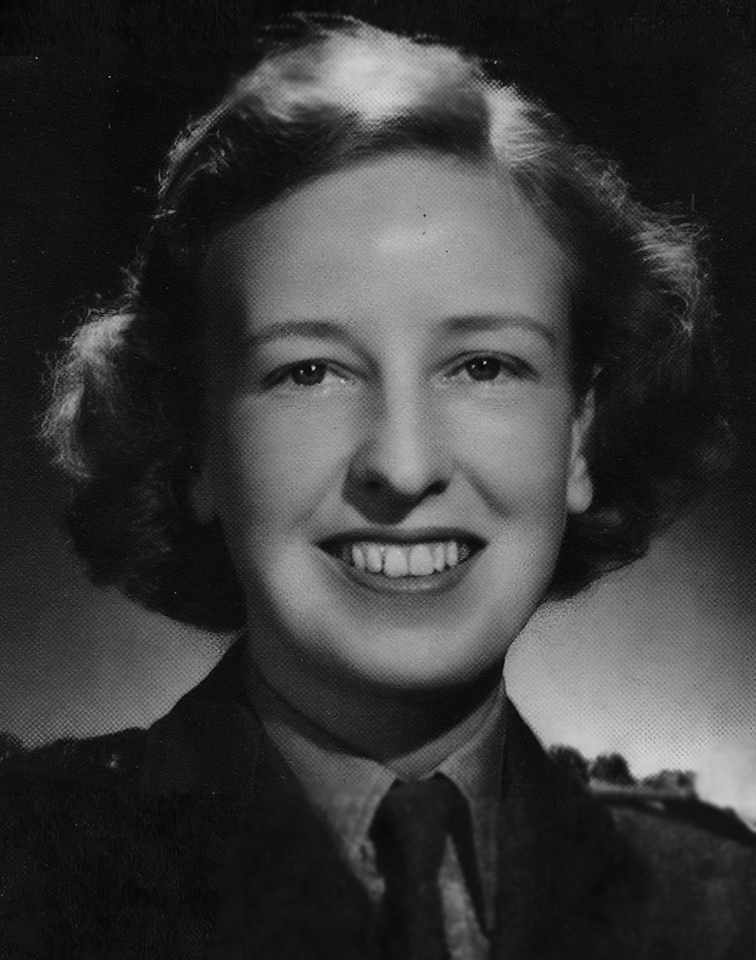
Gwen Lusby, 1943

Rubie was, with Max Dupain, David Moore and Laurence Le Guay, among a number of Australian photographers who had moved on from Pictorialism and were embracing Modernist tendencies, including montage and the New Realism as practiced in Europe and America. He produced publicity photographs for the Independent Theatre, and photographed members of the Ballets Russes de Colonel de Basil and performers in the avant-garde Bodenwieser Ballet's tour of India, where he also photographed Joan Falkiner. He also portrayed Dorothy Stevenson as Giselle, in her first dramatic role, with the Borovanaky Ballet. He was a friend of the modern artist Sidney Nolan, whom he advised on photography, and who gifted him one of the forty-seven Central Australian landscapes Nolan showed in an exhibition at the David Jones Gallery in 1950.

In the 1950s, commercial and industrial clients of Noel Rubie Pty. Ltd. included CSR Limited, Pyrmont; Kent and Waverley Breweries for Tooth and Co. Ltd.; Wunderlich Limited; and the Australian Broadcasting Commission. He regularly provided freelance photography for The Sydney Morning Herald.

== Theatre ==
Rubie was associated with the Independent Theatre in Sydney; he wrote and directed Timeless Moment which was performed in a short run there from 8 March 1945. Though that play was met with a poor review by The Bulletin, he returned after WW2 in 1954 to produce the decor and costumes for Captain Brassbound's Conversion, which The Bulletin found "pleasing in the orthodox modern manner," while in an earlier issue of the magazine the writer of the 'Women's Letters' more emphatically praised how his "costumes and decor gave a lesson in emphasis to budding interior-decorative artists, for all the intense color was concentrated on the only woman in the cast, Lady Cicely Waynflete, played by Doris Fitton. Flame coupled with grey, jacaranda-mauve with white, egg-yellow and emerald made her costumes more than striking, as if an intense spotlight was playing on her all the time."

In 1956 he designed the scenery for Australian writer, Barbara Vernon's 'whodunnit' set in the Malay jungle, Naked Possum.

Anton Vogt described Rubie's costume design in Racine's Phaedra performed in August 1961 at The Independent as "imposing and elegant," while Le Courrier Australien was more specific, noting that Rubie's 'rather free interpretation' of the Grecian setting, use of contemporary vocabulary and his 'costume of merit,' demanded much of the cast to put action into its delivery to satisfy audiences used to movement on stage, but also to retain their attention to Racine's poetry, the mood and expression of which Rubie had respected. The Australian Jewish Times noted; "That the overall production is...impressive is due in the first place to Rubie's adaptation which avoids too much artificiality," while "R.C." in The Sydney Morning Herald remarked on the energy of the production; "This was a "Phaedra" of violent mobility and flauntingly naked emotions; an effective piece of theatre with as much subtlety as a direct blow to the face," due to Rubie's "underlining and repeating what Racine was content to imply or state briefly" in his adaptation.

== Reception ==
The earliest newspaper review of Rubie's painting appeared in the 2 August 1929 edition of The Sydney Morning Herald when he showed with the Royal Art Society at the Education Department galleries in Sydney, in which the brief comment was "Mr. Noel Rubie has painted with decided effect the head in his portrait "Mary," and has blended his tones well but the management of the right arm resting upon the hip is not entirely convincing."

In the 1932 Australian Art Society group show, reviewer "C.S." singled Rubie out to conclude; "Noel Rubie, if he sets aside a few affectations, will become an excellent portrait painter. ' His portrait of a young boy is certainly the most striking picture in the show."

Of the 1933 Australian Art Society annual show The Bulletin describes Rubie's four portraits as "direct and simple, well-drawn," with his best being “Norma, a lady in black, effectively posed," while The Sydney Morning Herald reviewer considers Rubie "the most striking" among the oil-painters;

...simply because he has cut away all the non-essentials, the fuss over details that overwhelm, instead of emphasise, the sitter in a portrait; and has made form and character the principal things. Mr. Ruble's colour sense is, distinctly his weakest point. The brilliantly-hued, perfectly flat backgrounds are too aggressive; the contrasts they make, too obvious. But at least one feels that he is striving to emphasise structural quality. In Alan, the sinews of the arms are strongly felt. The hands grasping the table-edge have power in them. The figure Is a unity. One realises the solidity of it. In the two portraits of women, too, the personality comes forth from the picture easily and definitely. In a word, there is life.

In the Australian Art Society show and one at Grosvenor Galleries of the following year, Rubie's issue with backgrounds is seen to have been resolved, but the Herald reviewer is critical of the emphasis on surface effects over 'depth';

One, entitled The Corporal, has sterling qualities in its fine, clear, luminous background, which is striking without being too obtrusive. The figure has been developed with admirable smoothness of detail; and there is a plastic quality about It which is attractive; but the whole thing remains life a coloured photograph, devoid of emotion and personality. Far more alive is a self-portrait by Cliff Pier, painted on a ground of wood, which still shows ruggedly through.

The Bulletin identifies his portrait of a young man Lyric in the October 1934 show of "young commercial artists" at the Grosvenor Galleries as the "most graceful thing in the show...for the lines sing," His first solo exhibition, at the Grosvenor Galleries, Sydney in 1936 was given a lengthy review in The Sydney Morning Herald in which the journalist considered him 'a rising star' despite still being in his twenties, before taking issue with his titles because "more conservative visitors, beholding such descriptions as Symbolical of Something and Synthetic Kurrajong, may impute to the pictures a shallow attempt at smartness which is not their true quality. All the painting has obviously been done sincerely, and with painstaking attempts to penetrate below the mere casual outward aspect of things seen." In this review colour is singled out as "symphonies of strong green and glowing blue [...] always forceful, yet always gracious." The Bulletin of 17 June also treated the exhibition at length, and in the same issue included a lively account of the opening in its Women's Letters;

...there are at least three Noel Rubies—a portraitist who excels in the representation of vigorous youth, delighting in smooth modelling and the most meticulous rendition of detail; ...another...who exercises a dramatic, character-revealing Sargentesque touch; a decorationist who seeks to find a significant pattern in landscape and other natural forms ... there is lucidity of purpose and a degree of achievement that makes the purpose clear...These Yellow Sands, owes something to Van Gogh in its ... luminous, vibrant background. Symbolical of Something puts romance and beauty into a study of a wheat silo...and Heather is as successful a portrait as has been exhibited in Sydney these last five years.

A 1947 solo show, also at Grosvenor Galleries, drew praise from "J.C." of The Daily Telegraph as "the most significant one-man exhibition that has been shown in Sydney for a long time. Rubie displays a confidence in his technique, a sense of power and determination in his work, the lack of which is the chief fault in exhibitions by contemporary Australian artists," though this reviewer too found fault with titles as demonstrating 'bewilderment' about his subjects, and was concerned about a 'sameness' of treatment. The Herald reviewer dismissed the same work as derivative of Rubie's [photographic] "world of commercial advertising and the magazine cover," and not to be taken "seriously as art."

== Personal life ==
Rubie never married, and he enjoyed bachelorhood, yachting (in a black craft that he sold in 1948 to actor Grant Taylor), entertaining, and travel that included North Africa, India, Spain, England, Tahiti, America and Japan. He was quoted as considering what was 'chic' in a woman was her wearing clothes to the greatest advantage; "Charm is most important in a woman, but is impossible to see if she has that in a first look."

Wilfrid Thomas in the ABC Weekly recounted how after the War the photographer converted and combined 80-year-old semi-detached cottages into one residence at Kirribilli that overlooked Sydney Harbour Bridge with a swimming-pool, a balcony designed to look like a ship's promenade deck, a 'Naughty ’Nineties' bar with cedar-lined, crystal-lit discreet alcove, a lounge lined with books and a mural map of the world; and a music-room with a star-studded azure wall. In 1959 he redecorated it in a Japanese style, its windows replaced with shoji, the result being illustrated in a Herald article in which he commented that he had been born in one of the original terrace houses.

Rubie later relocated to the foothills of the Blue Mountains, at Freemans Reach to a mansion he designed in a Spanish Mission style. In 1960 the house and property were purchased for a boys home. He died on 13 July 1975 and is buried at Macquarie Park Cemetery and Crematorium, North Ryde, Ryde City, New South Wales.

== Productions ==
- Translator: Phaedra, Independent Theatre (1939-1977), North Sydney, NSW, 18 August 1961
- Designer, Director: Naked Possum, Independent Theatre (1939-1977), North Sydney, NSW, 13 September 1956
- Designer, Producer: Captain Brassbound's Conversion, Independent Theatre (1939-1977), North Sydney, NSW, 11 March 1954
- Playwright: Timeless Moment, Independent Theatre (1939-1977), North Sydney, NSW, 3 March 1945

== Exhibitions ==
=== Solo ===
- 1936, from 9 June: Noel Rubie, 21 paintings, opened by Denzil Batchelor a journalist for The Daily Telegraph newspaper, Grosvenor Galleries, 219 George Street, Sydney
- 1947, from 18 March: Noel Rubie, Grosvenor Galleries, Sydney
- 1957: Redfern Galleries, London
- 1964, 9–16 September: Noel Rubie. Barry Stern Gallery, 28 Glenmore Road, Paddington

=== Group ===
- 1929, August: Royal Art Society, Education Department galleries, Sydney
- 1930, from 10 June: Australian Art Society, 4th Annual Exhibition, Education Department galleries, Sydney
- 1930, August: Royal Art Society
- 1931, Archibald Prize
- 1931, June: Australian Art Society
- 1931, August: Rubie with W. Lister Lister, Sydney Long, Dattilo Rubbo, Charles Wheeler, Dorothy Bates, G. K. Townsend and others. Royal Art Society 52nd exhibition. Education Department galleries, Sydney
- 1932, June: Australian Art Society
- 1933, June: Rubie in the annual Australian Art Society with William Oates, Rhys Williams, H. C. Hadley, James A. Crisp, Walter Dowman, Kate Beard and W. M. Whitney. Education Department's gallery, Sydney
- 1934, June: with Rhys Williams, Quinton Tidswell, Garrett Kingsley, William M. Whitney, Walter Dowman, and others, Australian Art Society, Education Department galleries, Sydney
- 1934, from 24 October: Nine Young Artists, Rubie with Ronald H. Steuart, Harold Abbott, Carrington Smith, Quinton Tidswell, Francis Sherwood, Donald Friend, Charles H. Bassett, Eileen McGrath and sculptor Beaumont Moulden, Grosvenor Galleries, Sydney
- 1942, September: Society of Artists exhibition, Rubie with Norman Carter, Dattilo-Rubbo, Nora Heysen, Lloyd Rees, Adrian Feint, Maude Sherwood, Ronald Steuart, Kenneth Macqueen, Sydney Ure Smith, Frank Medworth, May Gonely, Daryl Lindsay, Lorna Nimmo, Freda Robertshaw
- 1949, from 28 March: Rubie with David Moore, Laurence Le Guay, Rob Hillier, John Hearder, Tony Cleal, John C. Nisbett, Ray Leighton, Milton Kent, Russell Roberts, Reg Johnson, John Lee, Ray Leighton, Hal Williamson and Athol Shmith, Institute of Photographic Illustrators, opened by Hal Missingham, director of the Art Gallery of New South Wales. David Jones Gallery

== Collections ==
- National Portrait Gallery
- The National Library of Australia
- Australian National University Research Collection
- Art Gallery of New South Wales
- State Library of Victoria
- Museum of Applied Arts and Sciences

== Gallery of photographs by Noel Rubie ==
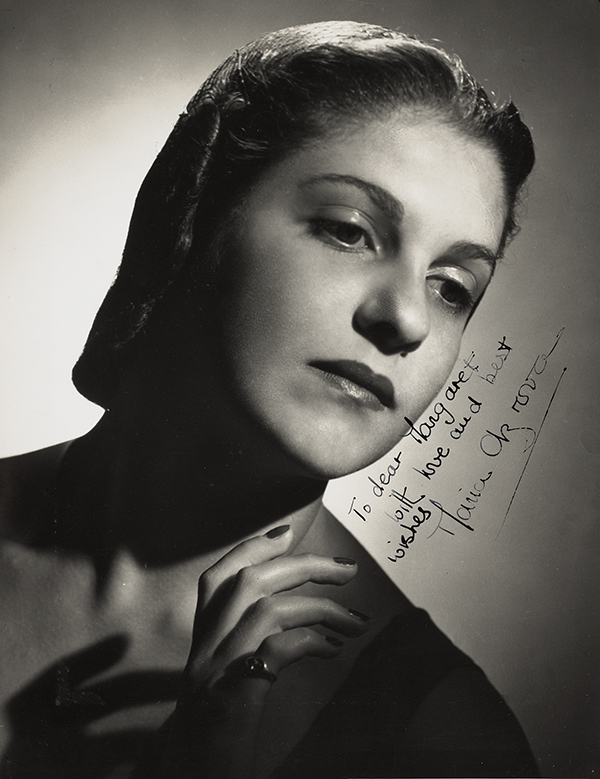
Maria Azrova 1940

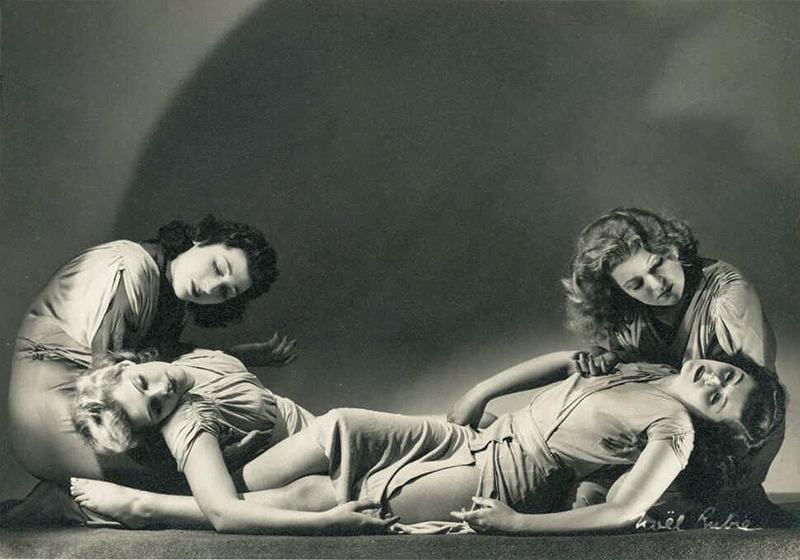
Bodenwieser Ballet in dance drama The Masks of Lucifer, 1944

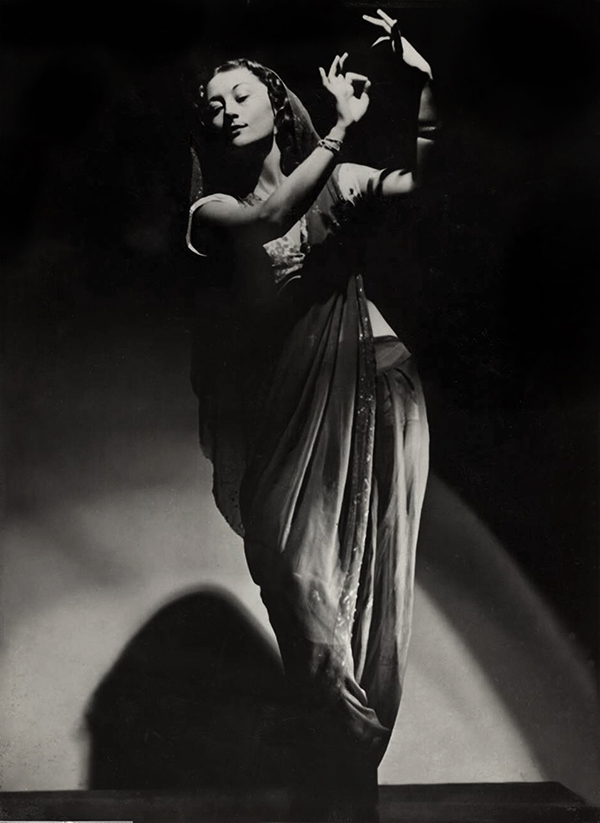
Eileen Kramer in Indian Love Song c.1952

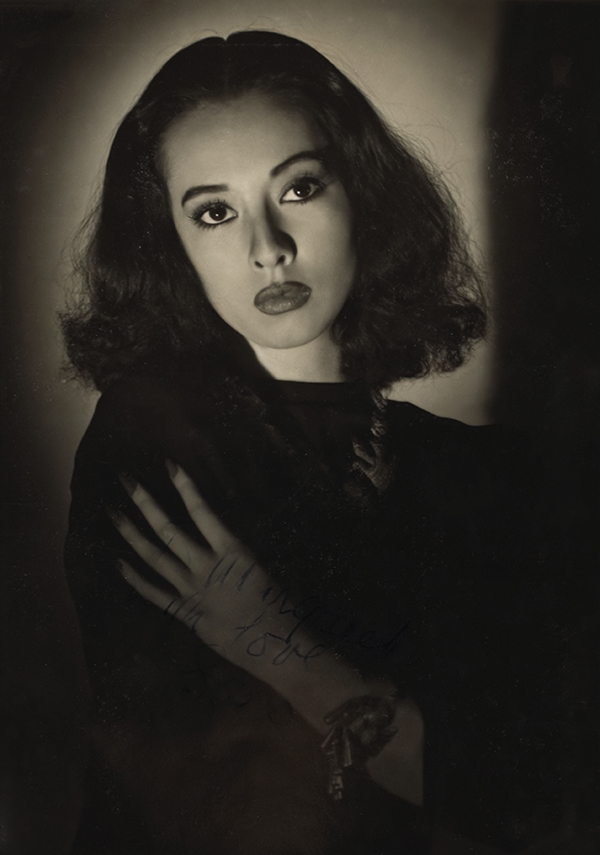
Sono Osato, 1940

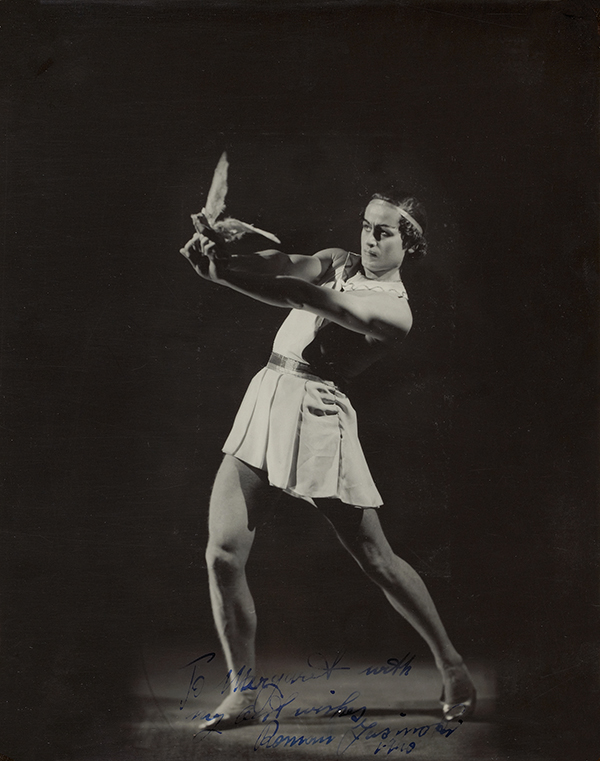
Roman Jasinski in Icare 1940

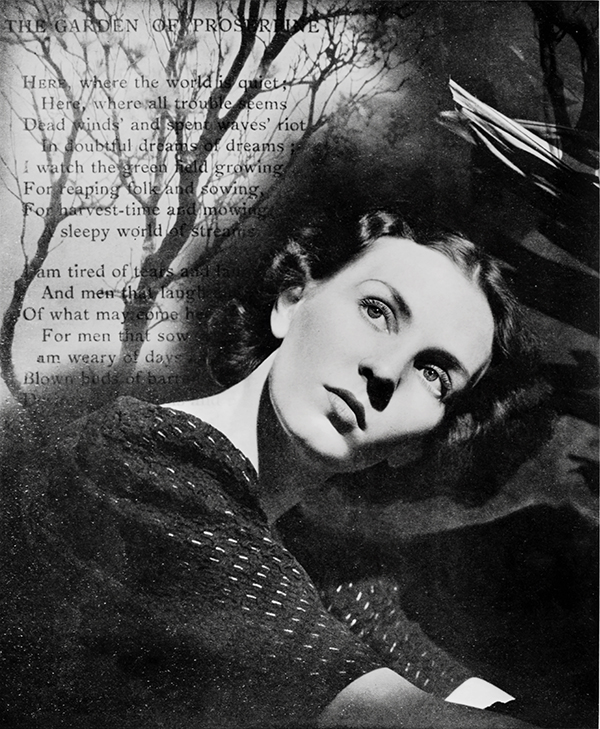
Margaret Doyle, 1938
