= Australian Watercolour Institute =

- Abbreviation: AWI
- Formation: 1923
- Type: Non-profit
- Purpose: Visual arts
- Headquarters: Sydney, Australia
- Region served: Australia
- Members: By invitation
- Official language: English
- President: David van Nunen
- Main organ: Committee
- Website: awi.com.au

The Australian Watercolour Institute (AWI) is a non-profit membership organization devoted to the advancement of watercolour painting in Australia. It was founded in 1923 by six painters in Sydney, and was modeled after the Royal Watercolour Society and the American Watercolor Society.

== History ==
The AWI's first exhibition occurred at Anthony Hordern & Sons' art gallery in 1924. A students' exhibition began in 1930. Until 1974, the AWI met in a variety of places and the annual exhibitions were held in different galleries. In that year, it received a grant enabling the AWI to rent space in a building on Sydney's Sussex Street. A reciprocal exhibition with the American Watercolor Society occurred in 1975, and in 1977, an AWI exhibition toured New Zealand. The international presence expanded to include Mexico City, Mexico; Spain; Vancouver, Canada; Hong Kong; and Korea (4th Asian Grand Watercolour Festival, Busan Biennale).

The founding members were J. Bennett, Alfred James Daplyn, Albert Henry Fullwood, Benjamin Edwin Minns, Martin Stainforth and Charles Ephraim Smith Tindall. Invited foundation members included Albert Collins, John Eldershaw, Hans Heysen, Norman Lindsay, Sydney Long, Arthur Streeton, John D Moore, J. W. Tristram and Blamire Young. Past presidents include George Duncan and Hal Missingham. Other notable members include Ronald Steuart, winner of the 1958 Wynne Prize, and Robert Wade, winner of the 1986 "Advance Australia Medal" for outstanding contribution to Australian watercolour. While membership was by invitation, it was not a requirement for exhibiting at the annual exhibition, such as the example of Heysen. Jean Isherwood's first exhibited work with the AWI in 1934 was a small painting, but thereafter, she became a frequent exhibitor in major art exhibitions. In 2006, ten percent of the membership were recipients of honours awarded by the Australian state (Australia Honours).

== Publications ==
AWI published its first book, Australian Watercolour Institute: 75th anniversary 1923–1998 on the occasion of its 75th anniversary in 1998. Its second book, The Australian Watercolour Institute: A Gallery of Australia's Finest Watercolours, was published in 2006. The 2006 edition reproduces over 150 contemporary Australian watercolour works, as well as forty historical ones, and includes essays that document Australia's watercolouring history.
