= Essie Ackland =

Australian singer

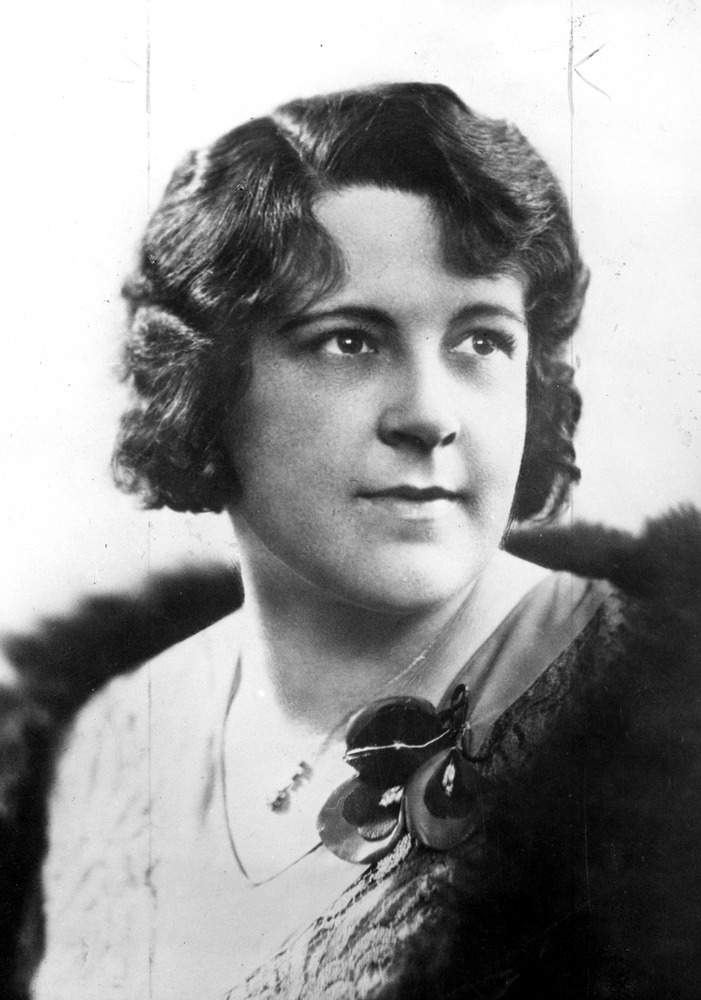
- Essie Ackland, c. 1937
- Born: Essie Adele Ackland; 27 March 1896; Woollahra, New South Wales, Australia
- Died: 14 February 1975 (aged 78); Mosman, New South Wales, Australia
- Education: New South Wales State Conservatorium of Music
- Occupation: Contralto
- Relatives: May Mabel Adamson (sister)

Essie Ackland (27 March 1896 – 14 February 1975) was an Australian contralto who performed ballads, songs and in oratorio and concerts. At one time her recordings were more in demand than those of any other female singer in the world. She also recorded Gilbert and Sullivan with Sir Malcolm Sargent, but never sang in standard operas.

== Early life ==
Goodbye author/composer Paolo Tosti, lyrics by George Whyte-Melville

Essie Adele Ackland was born in Sydney. She studied at the New South Wales State Conservatorium of Music under Roland Foster, and had further training under Joseph Bradley and Emily Marks. She performed locally and in Queensland, and was chosen to accompany the Belgian cellist Jean Gerardy on his 1923 tour of Australasia, with encouragement from Dame Clara Butt and Henri Verbrugghen. In 1925 she left for London, where in 1926 she married her former fellow student from Sydney, the baritone Reginald Morphew. They chose to keep their careers separate, seldom performing together, and remained married until his death.

== Career ==
She became a prominent oratorio and concert performer. Her friend Browning Mummery arranged for her to make some 40 recordings with the Gramophone Company, mainly of ballads, which, along with frequent radio broadcasts, spread her fame even more. She was last singer to perform at The Crystal Palace before it was destroyed by fire in 1936.

Essie Ackland toured Australia in 1937, by which time she was considered the most recorded contralto in the world. For her first Sydney concert on 13 March 1937, the demand for seats outstripped the Conservatorium's capacity, so the concert was moved to the Sydney Town Hall. She was accompanied by the violinist Ernest Llewellyn and the pianist Raymond Lambert. She toured her native land for four months, and a further two months in New Zealand. During World War II she sang over 1,300 times in hospitals, air raid shelters, army camps and factories throughout Great Britain, and entertained Australian soldiers at her London home.

== Later life ==
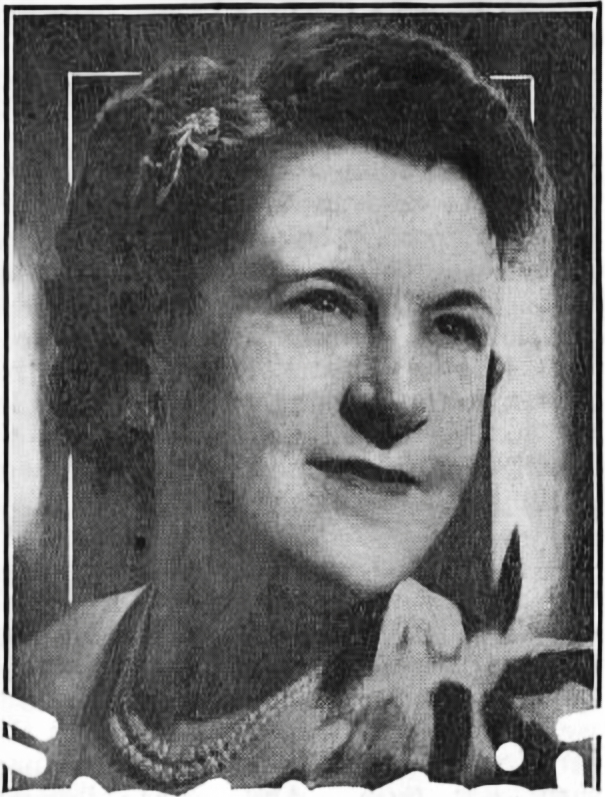
Essie Ackland on return to Australia in 1948. The Bulletin, photograph by Noel Rubie

Ackland returned from overseas and toured Australia again in 1948, accompanied by Geoffrey Parsons. On 13 June 1948, she sang with the Sydney Symphony Orchestra under Eugene Goossens. The Bulletin reported in September that after finishing her interstate tour for the ABC with a matinee in Sydney Town Hall and a recital at Wollongong she gave a series of concerts in the northern coalfields commissioned by the Joint Coal Board, in which Adelaide violinist Carmel Hakendorf and pianist Geoffrey Parsons accompanied her. They performed in three other states in Brisbane, Toowoomba, Lismore, Murwillumbah, Broken Hill, Adelaide, Mount Gambier, and Kalgoorlie.

Ackland retired in 1949. She lived at Gosford before her death in February 1975 aged 78 in Mosman, a Sydney suburb. She was cremated.
