= J. W. Tristram =

Australian watercolour artist (1870–1938)

- Born: 7 October 1870; Gillingham, Kent, England
- Died: 19 August 1938 (aged 67); Sydney, Australia
- Style: watercolour

John William Tristram (7 October 1870 – 19 August 1938) was an Australian artist who painted primarily in watercolour. He commonly signed his paintings "J. W. Tristram".

== Biography ==
Born at Gillingham, Kent, England, Tristram was first of the eight children of Samuel Herbert Tristram and his wife Hannah Thompson. His father was a gunnery instructor in the British Army and accepted a posting in Australia which resulted in the family's emigration. John was 13 when they arrived in Sydney on 21 December 1883.

Tristram's artistic abilities were utilised in seeking employment and by April 1885 he was accepted as a junior draftsman in the Architect's Branch of the Department of Public Instruction (which became the Department of Education in 1915). He was to remain in this career until he retired in 1930.

On 14 October 1891 he married Maude Face at Woollahra, in Sydney's eastern suburbs. In 1899 John, Maude and their surviving children moved north of Sydney Harbour to Mosman which, from its earliest days, had strong connections with the creative arts in Sydney. He remained a resident of Mosman until his death in 1938.

During his life Tristram was an active participant on the committees of three art societies: Art Society of New South Wales (which became the Royal Art Society of New South Wales when its Royal charter was granted in 1903), Australian Watercolour Institute and Australian Art Society.

Aside from his painting, Tristram was known as a contributor of poetry to publications such as The Bulletin and The Lone Hand as well as being a talented musician.

J. W. Tristram and his wife Maude had children Ashwin, John, Norah and Molly. He died in Sydney on 19 August 1938.

== Works ==
Tristram's watercolours were typically soft and delicate. He was best known for his coastal scenes and rural landscapes which were often nocturnes or low light depictions of dawn or dusk. His works can be found in the collections of many Australian public galleries including: National Gallery of Australia, Art Gallery of New South Wales, National Gallery of Victoria, Art Gallery of South Australia and Queensland Art Gallery.

== Gallery ==
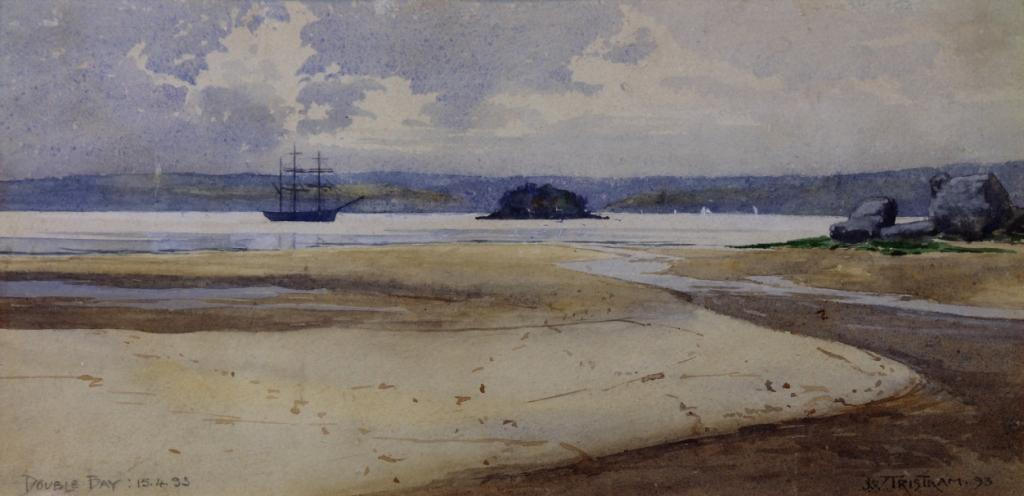
Double Bay (1893)

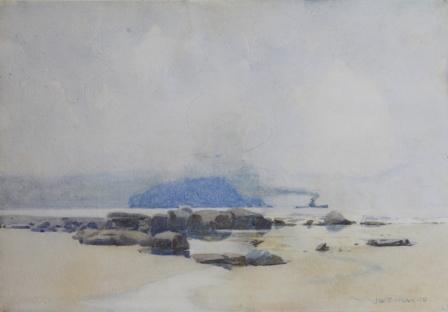
Untitled (seascape) (1905)

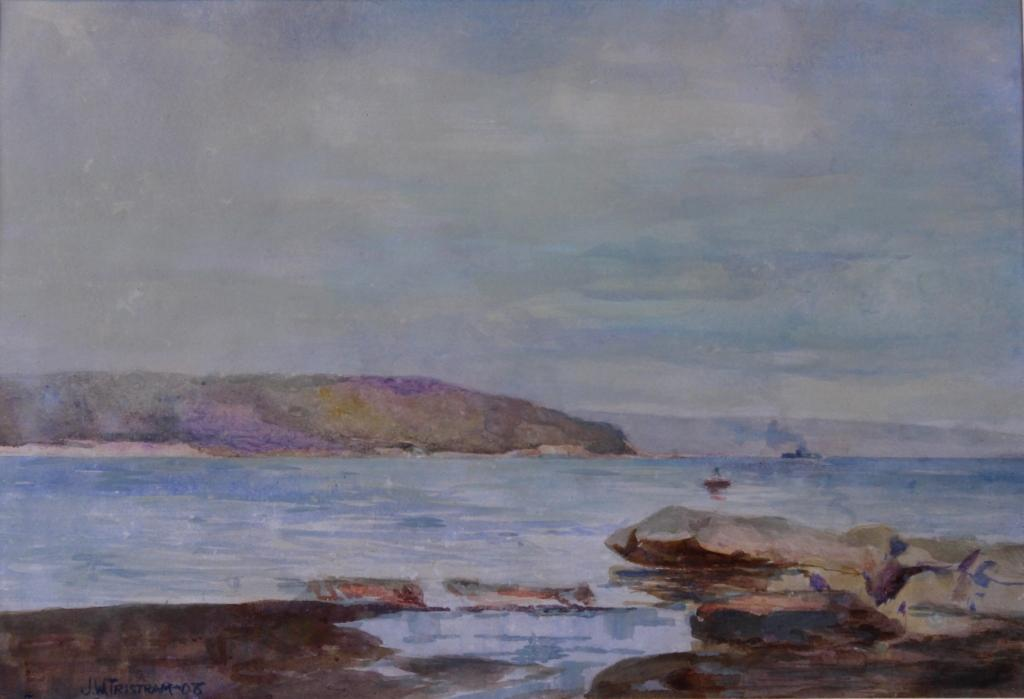
Sydney Harbour (1908)

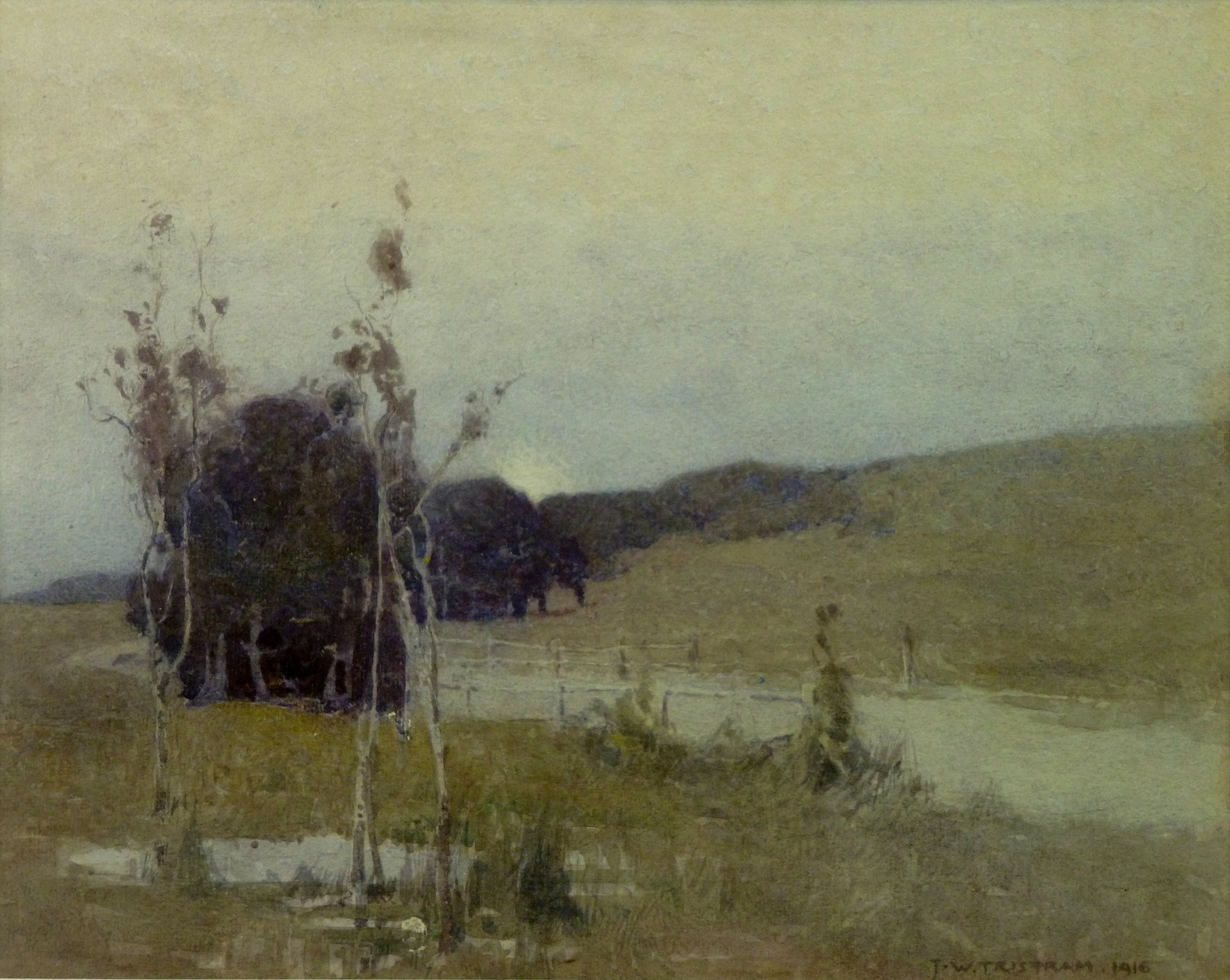
Pastoral (1916)

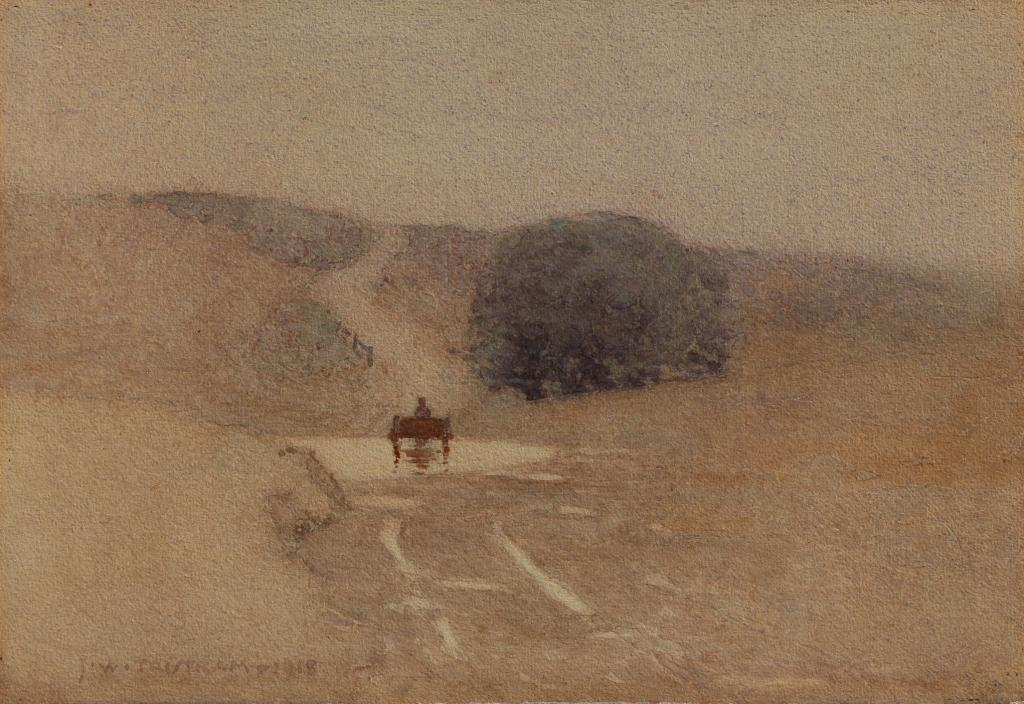
End of the day (1918)

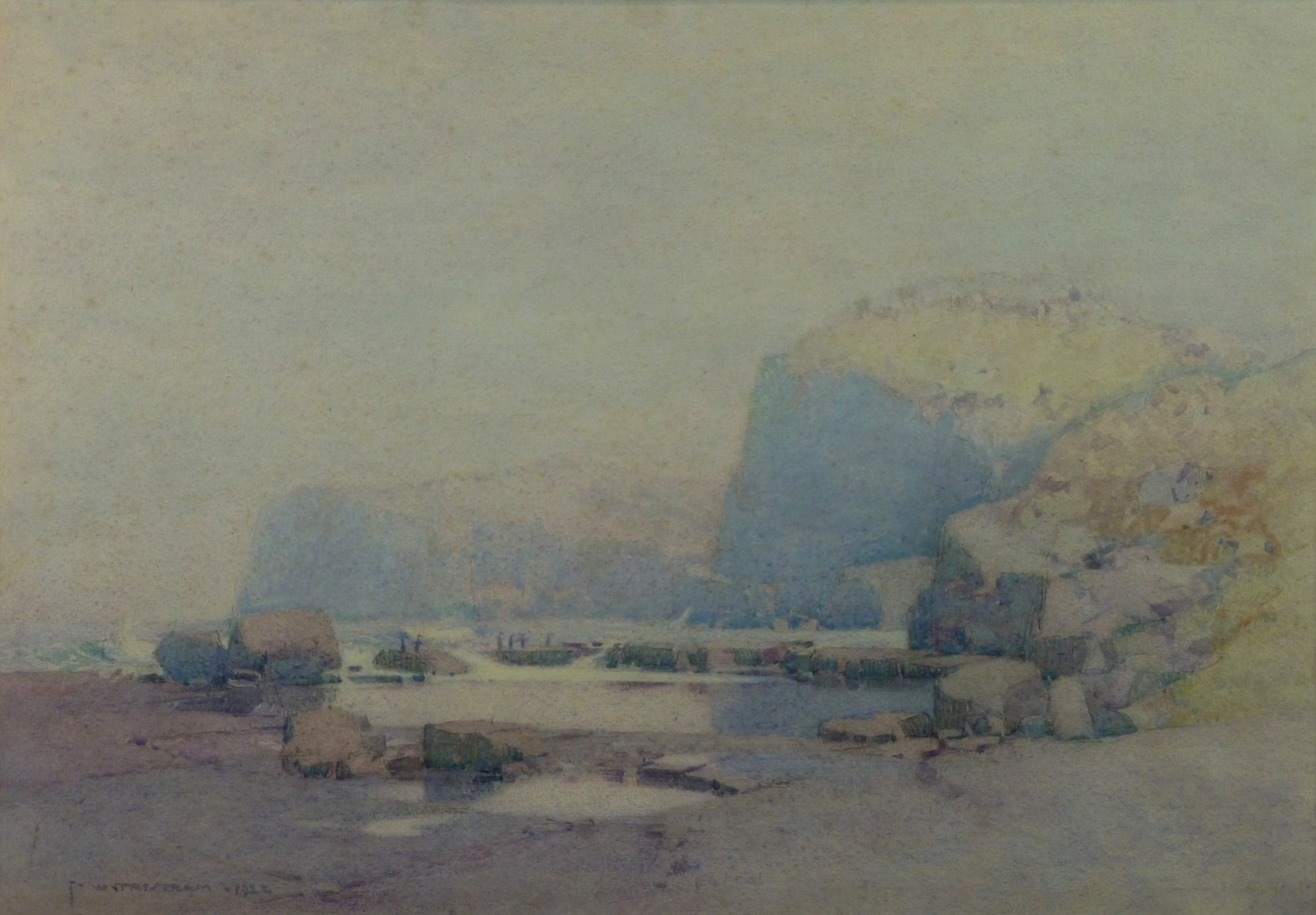
South coast rock platform with penguins (1922)

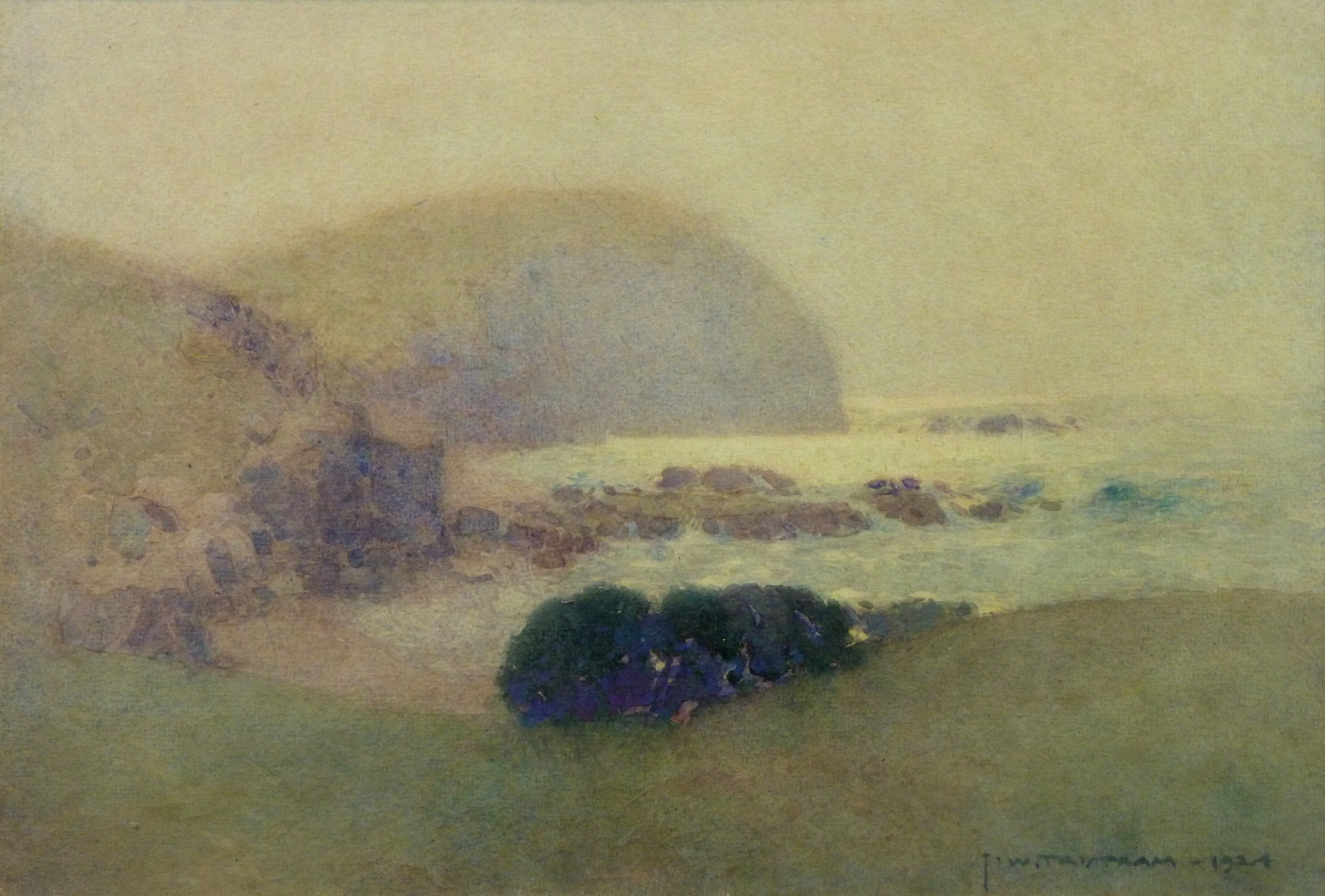
Beachscape (1924)

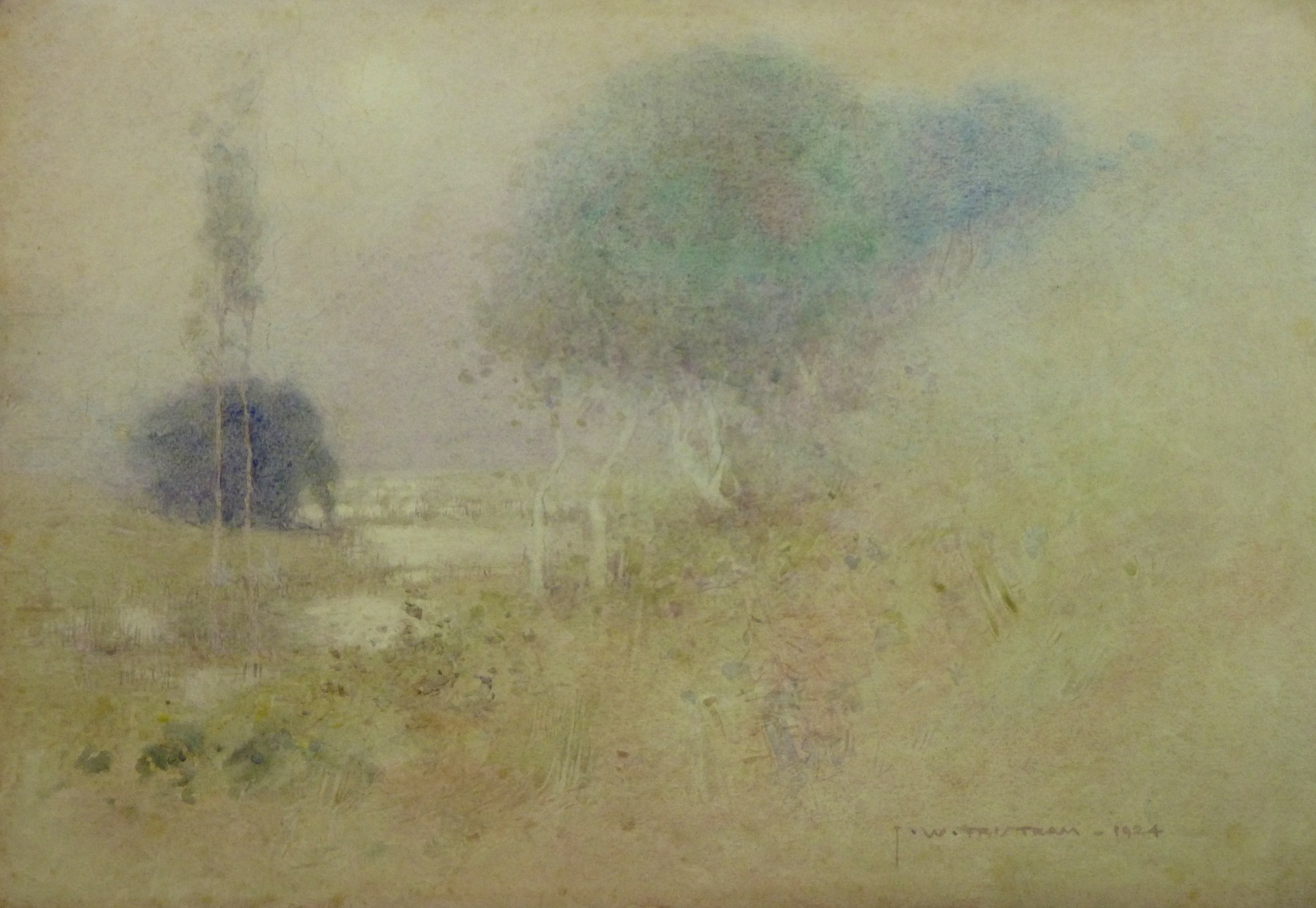
The creek in morning mist (1924)

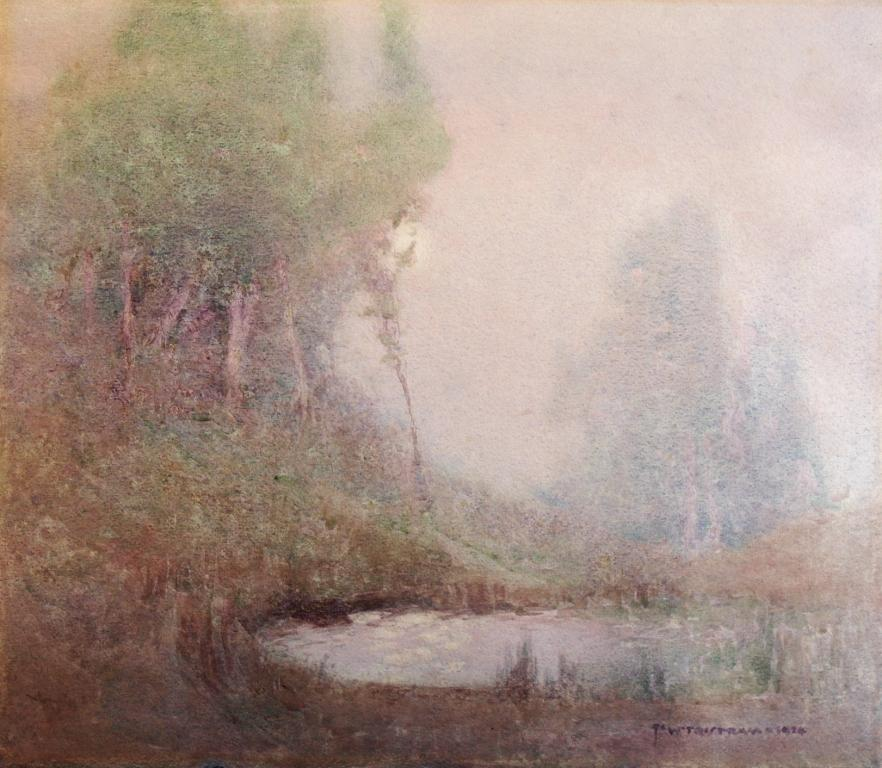
The pool (1924)

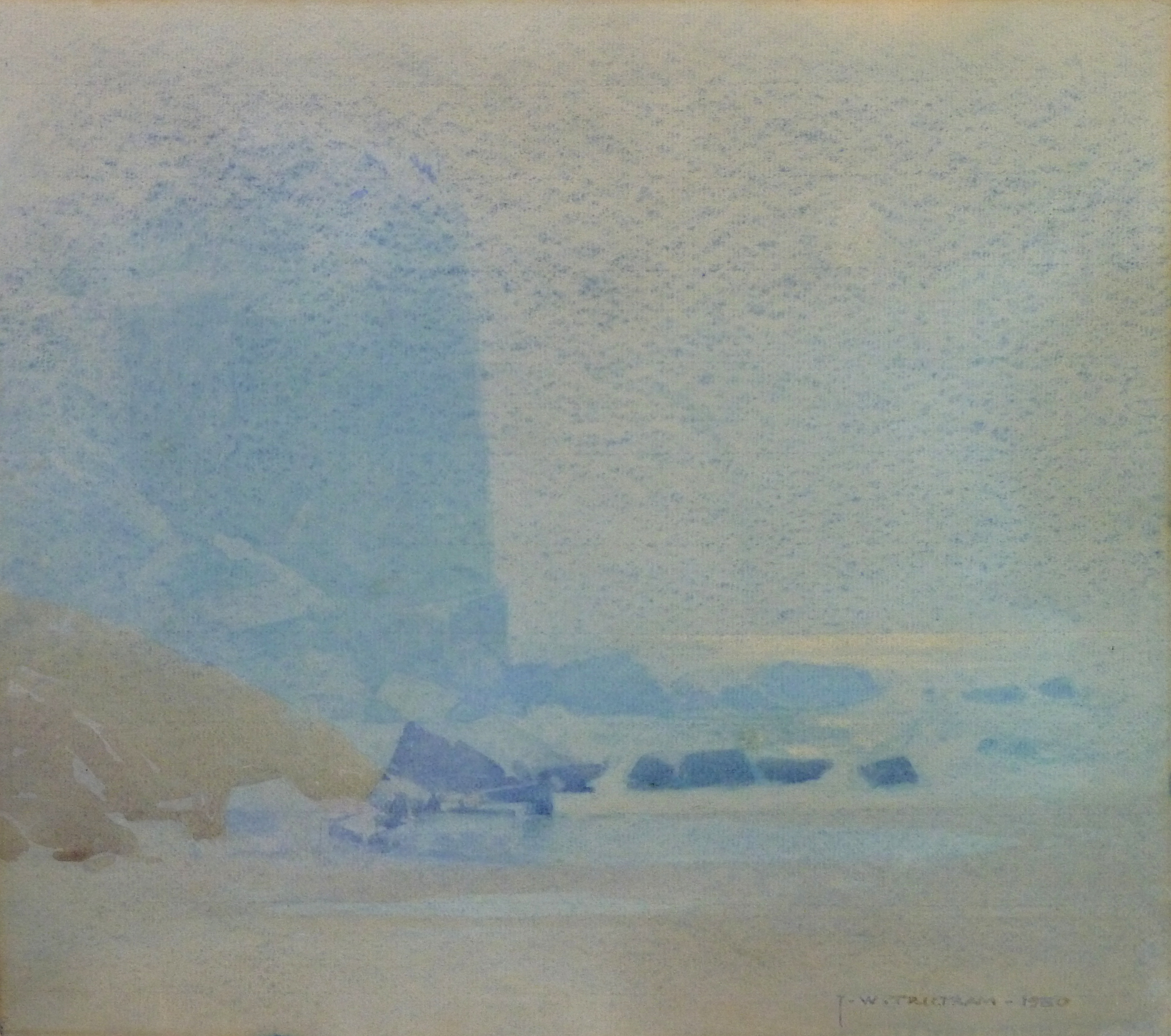
Moonlight reflection through the mist (1930)
