= Jean Isherwood =

Australian artist (1911–2006)

Landscape by Jean Isherwood

Jean de Courtenay Isherwood OAM FRAS AWI (1911 – 6 January 2006) was an Australian watercolour and oil painter, and teacher, renowned for her colourful depictions of the Australian countryside.

== Biography ==
Isherwood was born in Marrickville, Sydney in 1911. At the age of fourteen she won a scholarship to the National Art School at East Sydney Technical College. Through her studies, Isherwood gained an appreciation for linear perspective and accurate draughtsmanship which she later applied with great skill to her rural landscapes.

In 1929, Isherwood commenced work as a fashion artist for an advertising agency, continuing her studies for a further five years at the National Art School and Royal Art Society as an evening student. She later worked as a freelance fashion artist and illustrator, including work with the Australian Women's Weekly. Her first exhibited work with the Australian Watercolour Institute in 1934 was a small painting of a building site. From that time, she became a frequent exhibitor in major art exhibitions. She was a student of Antonio Dattilo Rubbo.

Isherwood went on to become part of the Sydney bohemian art scene and met John Dabron, whom she married in 1940. They moved to Springwood in the Blue Mountains and had two children, Josephine and Jacqueline. They divorced in 1948 After the divorce, she returned to fashion drawing and illustration to support herself, pursuing her art interests, as she had before, on the weekend. Also, in 1948, Isherwood was made a member of the Australian Watercolour Institute. She took up full-time painting in 1952.

In 1959 Isherwood toured New South Wales by automobile. From this point onward, she primarily engaged in landscape painting and, through her attachment to the countryside, became a major exhibitor in the art competitions held in conjunction with the shows run by the local Agricultural Societies and culminating each year in the Sydney Royal Easter Show with its exhibition attracting hundreds of entrants. From 1950 until her death Isherwood won more than 100 first prizes in various art competitions.

From 1961 to 1974, Isherwood taught at the National Art School. This was a period of conflicting views in the world of art education in Sydney; the disciplinary approach to the skills of perspective, anatomy and design was considered by both teachers and students alike to be passé and unnecessary to the creation of works of art, the stylistic vogue in teaching being Abstract Expressionism. Isherwood was one of several educators who fiercely maintained support for this approach. An exacting teacher, she stalked her students with a kneadable putty eraser in hand as they worked, challenging their skills with arrangements of battered metal rubbish bins, piles of broken chairs and, on rainy days, a dripping sixteen-rib umbrella. It was said of Miss Isherwood that no student escaped her class without being able to draw parallel lines and precise ellipses, freehand.

== "My Country" ==
In 1974, Isherwood made a trip to Central Australia. On her return journey, passing through Tamworth, New South Wales, she was struck by the beauty of the countryside of that region and in 1976 purchased a property at Moonbi, where she was to live until 1987 when she moved to Tamworth.

In 1982, Isherwood heard on the radio that a statue was to be erected as a memorial to Dorothea Mackellar at Gunnedah, on Australia Day, 26 January 1983. Isherwood had long had it in mind to create a series of works illustrating the writer's most famous poem "My County". Prompted by the imminent celebration, Isherwood created a series of thirty four watercolour paintings for exhibition in Gunnedah in conjunction with the unveiling of the statue.

Parched landscape with storm clouds

The images represent the diversity of the Australian landscape and include "the filmy veil of greenness" seen from Isherwood's own window including a flood on the Darling River, a bushfire in the Blue Mountains and a forest of ringbarked trees near Armidale. The paintings were eventually put on permanent display in the Gunnedah Bicentennial Regional Gallery. Isherwood set about painting a series of oils based on the watercolours. These were exhibited at the Artarmon Galleries in Sydney in 1986.

In November 2004, Isherwood participated in an exhibition called Eighty and Over with seven other well-known Australian artists, all over the age of eighty, at Max Taylor's Gallery in Summer Hill. She died at home on 6 January 2006, aged 94 years. Her funeral notice requested that those attending wear bright colours.

== Exhibitions, societies and awards ==
From 1946 to her death, Isherwood took part in nineteen exhibitions, three of which were with her daughter, Jaqueline Dabron, in the state capitals of Sydney, Brisbane and Melbourne. A retrospective exhibition was held in the New South Wales regional galleries of Tamworth and Muswellbrook. In 2012, thirty-two of Isherwood's watercolors were featured in Sister Cities, the inaugural exhibition of Gallery Lane Cove on Sydney's north shore. Her portrait of Marjorie Cotton was exhibited in First Ladies: Significant Australian Women 1913-2013 at the National Portrait Gallery in Canberra. Her work is represented in the National Gallery of Australia, Canberra; the Art Gallery of NSW; the Howard Hinton Collection, Armidale Regional Gallery; the Tamworth Art Gallery, the National Portrait Gallery alongside many other regional galleries and private collections.

Isherwood became a member of the Australian Watercolour Institute in 1948, and a member of the Royal Art Society in 1976, being elected a Fellow in 1982. In 1994, she was awarded the Order of Australia Medal for her contribution to the Arts for painting in oils and watercolours. In 1980, Isherwood took part in an exhibition at Artarmon Galleries, which exhibited her work posthumously in 2008. Over the course of Isherwood's career, she won over 100 first prizes.
