= Benjamin Edwin Minns =

Australian artist

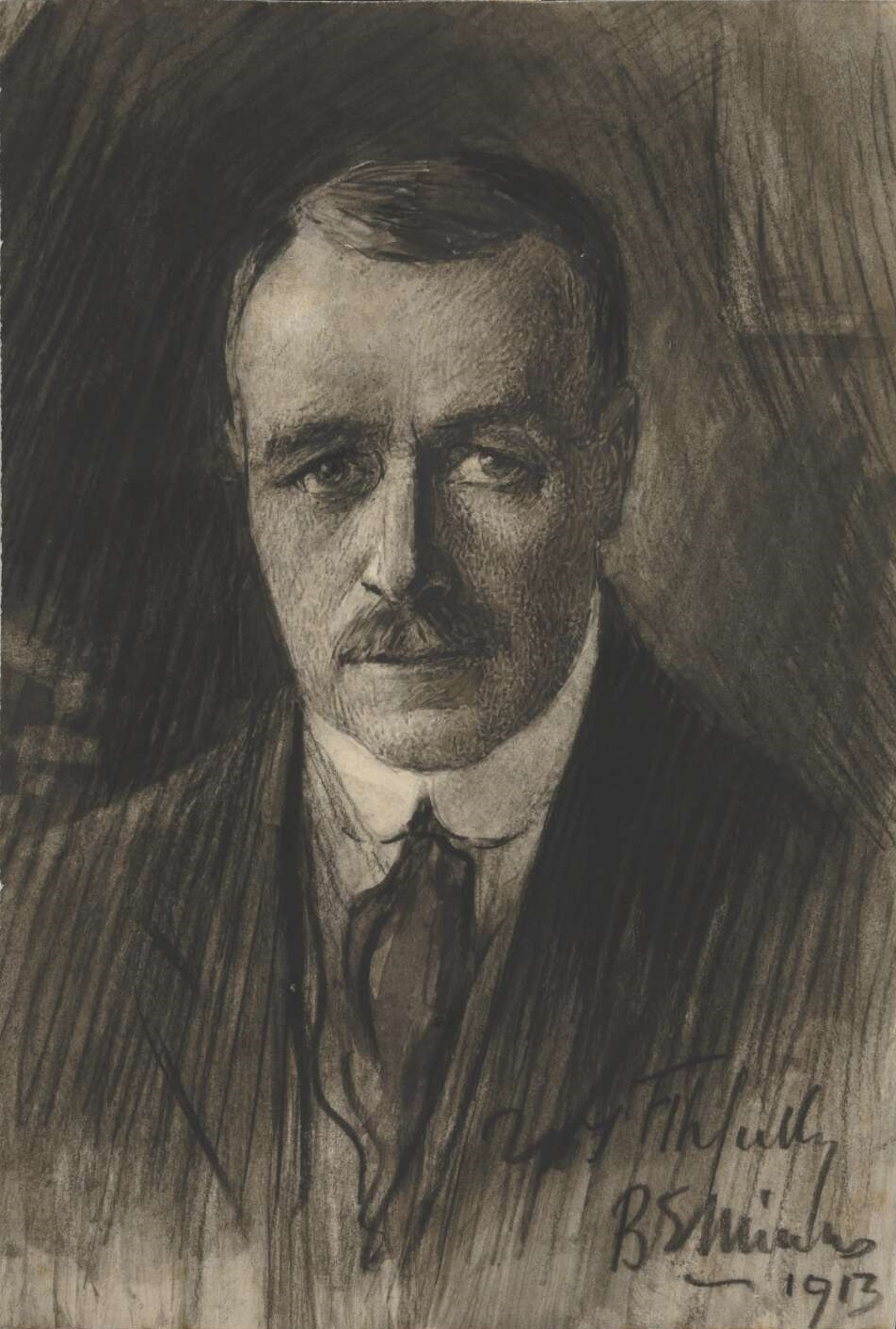
- Self-portrait, 1913
- Born: 17 February 1863; Dungog, New South Wales
- Died: 21 February 1937 (aged 74); Taronga Park Zoo, Sydney, New South Wales
- Resting place: Northern Suburbs Crematorium, Sydney
- Education: Sydney Technical College
- Occupations: Visual artist; painter; photographer
- Years active: c. 1880s–1937
- Known for: Watercolours; black-and-white paintings; Indigenous portraits
- Spouse: Harriet Ford (m. 1888)
- Parents: George Minns (father); Bridget Murray (mother)
- Awards: Sesquicentennial Prize (1938; posth.)
- Elected: Australian Watercolour Institute (President) (1924–1937)
- Patrons: Rhodes family
- Memorials: Minns Road, Gordon

Benjamin Edwin Minns (17 November 1863 – 21 February 1937), commonly referred to as B. E. Minns, was an Australian watercolourist and black-and-white artist, remembered for his portraits of Aboriginal people.

== Biography ==
Minns was born in Dungog, New South Wales, the son of Bridget Murray (c. 1846 – c. 1924), who married George E. Minns (born c. 1842) in 1869. They lived in Inverell, where Minns had lessons in painting and drawing. Intending to have a career in law, Minns went to Sydney and worked for the law firm Abbot & Allen. However, he met the artist Charles Conder with whom he shared a studio. Minns then studied under Lucien Henry at Sydney Technical College, also taking lessons from the plein air painter Julian Ashton.

Minns obtained his first job at the Illustrated Sydney News with Conder's help; Minns also drew for The Sydney Mail and regularly contributed to The Bulletin. Minns married Harriet Ford in 1888; and they remained childless.

From 1895 Minns worked in England, contributing to St Paul's Magazine, Punch, The Strand Magazine, the Bystander and other publications as well as sending drawings to The Bulletin. Whilst in England, Minns was befriended by the Rhodes family, who became benefactors and commissioned several of his works. In 1915 he returned to Australia by the liner Benalla, along with a quantity of his paintings. While at Capetown, a fire broke out aboard the ship and most of Minns' works were destroyed and the passengers had an enforced layover while repairs were undertaken.

Minns was a founder in 1924 and inaugural president (until 1937) of the Australian Watercolour Institute.

He collapsed and died while photographing at Taronga Park Zoo, and his remains were ashed at the Northern Suburbs Crematorium. Minns Road in Gordon was renamed in his honour following his death.
