= Margaret Doyle (announcer) =

First female newsreader in Australia

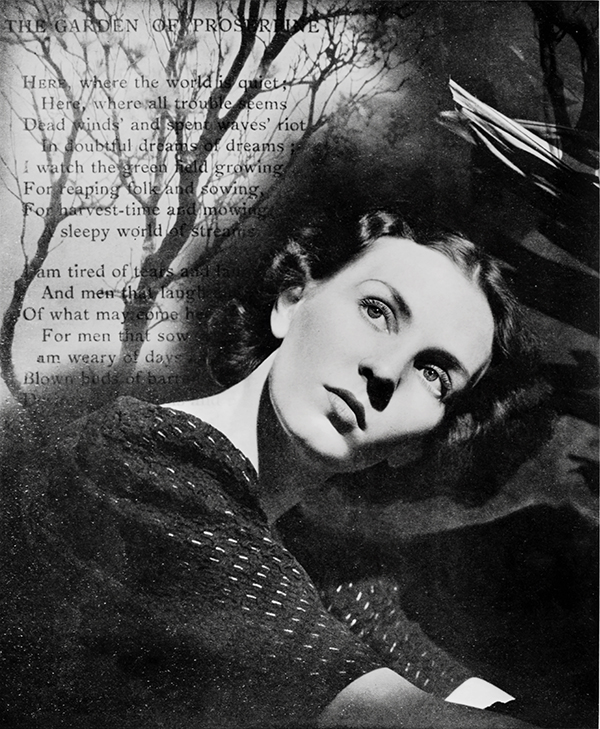
Margaret Doyle at 18, photographed for The Bulletin by Noel Rubie

Margaret Trevor Doyle (later Henderson) (1920 – 25 February 2002) was the first woman newsreader and national radio announcer in Australia. She commenced work with the Australian Broadcasting Commission in 1941 and her voice is preserved on the earliest surviving news item contained in the broadcaster's archive, which is a 1941 radio story on protecting active servicemen in World War II from creditors.

== Radio career ==
Doyle had previously worked as a librarian and hostess at the Pickwick Book Club in Sydney before responding to an advertisement for radio announcers. Following an audition which included reading a weather report and a paragraph of news, she was appointed from a pool of 500 applicants. The choice of a female radio announcer was a deliberate wartime measure to enable men to leave employment and participate in World War II and had already been enacted by the British Broadcasting Commission.

== Personal life ==
Doyle was the eldest daughter of Trevor Mervyn Doyle (born 26 April 1883) of Tamworth and Winifred Amy Doyle (née Szchille) (died 11 February 1957) of Sydney.

She married the pastoralist George Wallace Henderson (died 2002) on 8 April 1941 and they lived on their property 'Rannoch', near Blayney. They did not have children.

== Philanthropic work ==
The Hendersons were generous philanthropists and patrons of the arts, especially opera and music. They were involved in numerous scholarships and donations.

In 1993, the Margaret Henderson Scholarship was established at the Sydney Conservatorium of Music from personal donations made by Doyle and, in 1996, she founded the Margaret Henderson Music Trust in Orange. Prior to her death in 2002, music students from the conservatorium would regularly visit to perform for Doyle in her nursing home in Kings Cross.

The couple bequeathed sixteen million dollars to the Sydney Conservatorium of Music. It was the largest donation ever made to an Australian performing arts institution.
