= Heather George =

Australian photographer

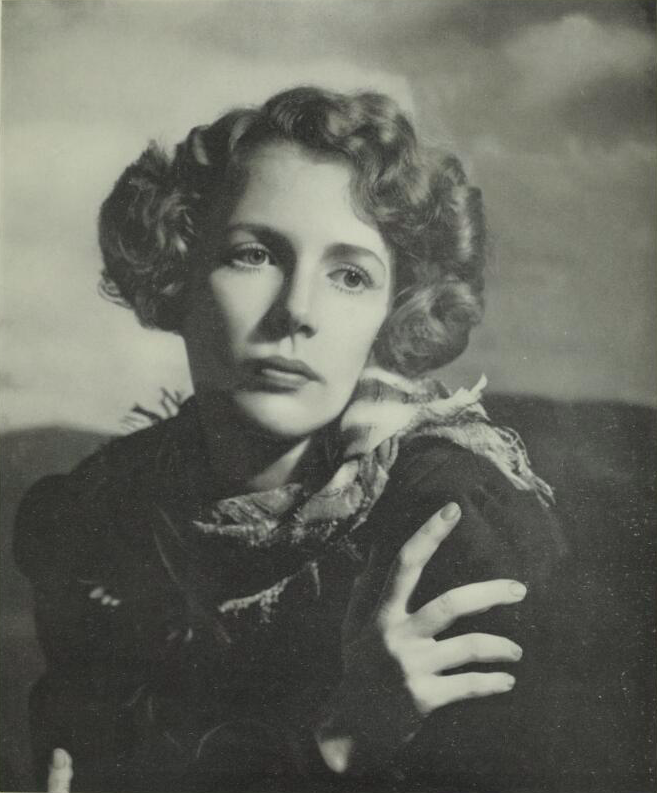
- Portrait of Heather George by Noel Rubie, published in the July 1938 edition of The Home: An Australian Quarterly. Image courtesy National Library of Australia
- Born: 29 April 1907; Gordon, New South Wales
- Died: 1983; Paddington, New South Wales?
- Occupations: Freelance photographer, artist
- Known for: Walkabout photographer

Heather George (1907–1983) was a commercial photographer known for her industrial, fashion and outback photography, and a designer and painter.

== Early life ==
Heather George was born on 29 April 1907 in Gordon, New South Wales to father Wesley, a builder, and mother Helen. She attended public primary schools and then a boarding school in the Blue Mountains which was a better climate for her asthma. After secondary education she went to East Sydney Technical College to study art and commercial art amongst fellow students including Dahl Collings, Elaine Haxton, Joshua Smith, taught by sculptor Rayner Hoff, and later continued her studies in British-born James S. Watkins' private Sydney art school in order to concentrate on drawing.

On leaving Technical College in 1927 George went to live with her family in Canberra after its official opening, where her father and his partner had built a number of its early buildings. There, she taught art at St Gabriel's Church of England Grammar School and arts and crafts at the Y.W.C.A. She joined the Artists' Society of Canberra and was the first woman to be on its council.

On return to Sydney some years later George practised as a commercial artist designing in the then-emerging field of neon signs for businesses and theatres.

After a break from study of some years Heather again took up training in painting with fellow students Helen Lempriere, Matcham Skipper, Lesley Sinclair and Madeleine Jorgensen under the tonalist artist Justus Jorgenson in Melbourne, where she worked in textile design at Vida Turner's firm at 191 Queen Street.

== Photographer ==
By 1938, at the age of 31, George had taken up photography professionally and worked at Noel Rubie’s portrait and industrial photography studio in Sydney. Taken by Rubie, a wistful portrait of George, who was an actor and artist as well as a photographer, appears full-page in a 1938 issue of The Home : an Australian quarterly over the caption "Miss Heather George, of Artarmon, is a youthful Sydney artist who has lately abandoned painting for photography". She later practiced at a series of Melbourne and Victorian country photography studios.

By the late 1950s George had become a freelance photographer and photojournalist, photographing Sydney’s older suburbs, and stately homes in Hunters Hill She moved to Victoria and recorded the nineteenth-century slate-tiled warehouses of the St James Buildings, the demolition of the Eastern Markets and the construction of the King Street Bridge, the watch-tower of Melbourne’s fire station, and mud-brick buildings in Eltham.

In 1952 George stayed for months in the outback of the Northern Territory, where her sister and her sister's husband were stationed at several reservations, and there photographed indigenous subjects for whom she developed great respect and love, including the Warlpiri people whom she described as among Australia's "most hardy and interesting aborigines", and others on the reserves, including school children at Areyonga Aboriginal Reserve, or working in cattle stations including Wave Hill.

George shared her time between Melbourne and Sydney, and after 24 years based in Melbourne, settled in Paddington in the sixties, the suburb in which her grandfather Tom George was for many years an alderman and at one time Mayor. She continued to be a regular contributor of photographs for Walkabout, and many articles of the 60s feature her pictures of that suburb, of Woolloomooloo, Castlecrag, and of other features of Sydney, including Taronga Park Zoo, the Butler Stairs of Kings Cross, the multi-storied Chevron-Hilton hotel at Potts Point under construction, the emerging street cafés Macquarie Street, and the Mitchell Library. She travelled to Hobart for pictures of the Cat and Fiddle Square Her work also appeared in Hoofs and Horns, Pix, Women's Day, as well as the National Trust Magazine.

== Later life ==
George discontinued her work as a photojournalist in the late 1960s but continued to draw and paint. She died in 1983. Her work was represented in 2026 in the National Gallery of Victoria exhibition Women Photographers 1900 – 1975: A Legacy of Light.

== Collections ==
- National Gallery of Victoria, Melbourne, Victoria, Australia
- State Library of New South Wales
