= Robert Wade (watercolour artist) =

Australian artist (1930–2024)

- Born: 29 July 1930; Melbourne, Australia
- Died: 30 January 2024 (aged 93); Melbourne, Australia

Robert Albert William Wade, OAM (29 July 1930 – 30 January 2024) was an Australian artist.

Wade lectured on the heritage of Australian watercolour to many art societies around the world, and was referred to as Australia's Unofficial Ambassador of Watercolour. He authored several books including, Robert Wade's Watercolor Workshop Handbook, Painting more than the eye can see, and Painting your vision in watercolor. Wade died in Malvern, Melbourne on 30 January 2024, at the age of 93.
