= Ronald Steuart =

Ronald Hewison Steuart (1898–1988) was a member of Australian Watercolour Institute from 1934 to 1988, a senior artist and was a life member of the institute.

Won the Wynne Prize in 1958 with the painting "The Cliff". The Wynne Prize is awarded for "the best landscape painting of Australian scenery in oils or watercolours or for the best example of figure sculpture by Australian artists completed during the 12 months preceding the [closing] date".

His work "Hawkesbury Landscape" hangs at the University of New South Wales, and was acquired in 1960. His work "Image" c. 1940s hangs in the Art Gallery of South Australia, while "Mirage" c.1950, an oil on canvas on cardboard 54.0 h x 55.4 w cm, is owned by the National Gallery of Australia. Mirage was purchased in 2007 with the assistance of James Agapitos OAM and Ray Wilson OAM.

The Art Gallery of NSW own many Steuart works including; Ettalong (7253), Autumn Lagoon (7540), Picnic sketch (6546), A country lane near Cobbity (6479), In a sea pool (7685), The ferry (8561) and River reeds at Tizzana (9242). Art Gallery of NSW Steuart collection.
