= Geoffrey Parsons (pianist) =

Australian pianist (1929–1995)

Geoffrey Parsons AO, OBE
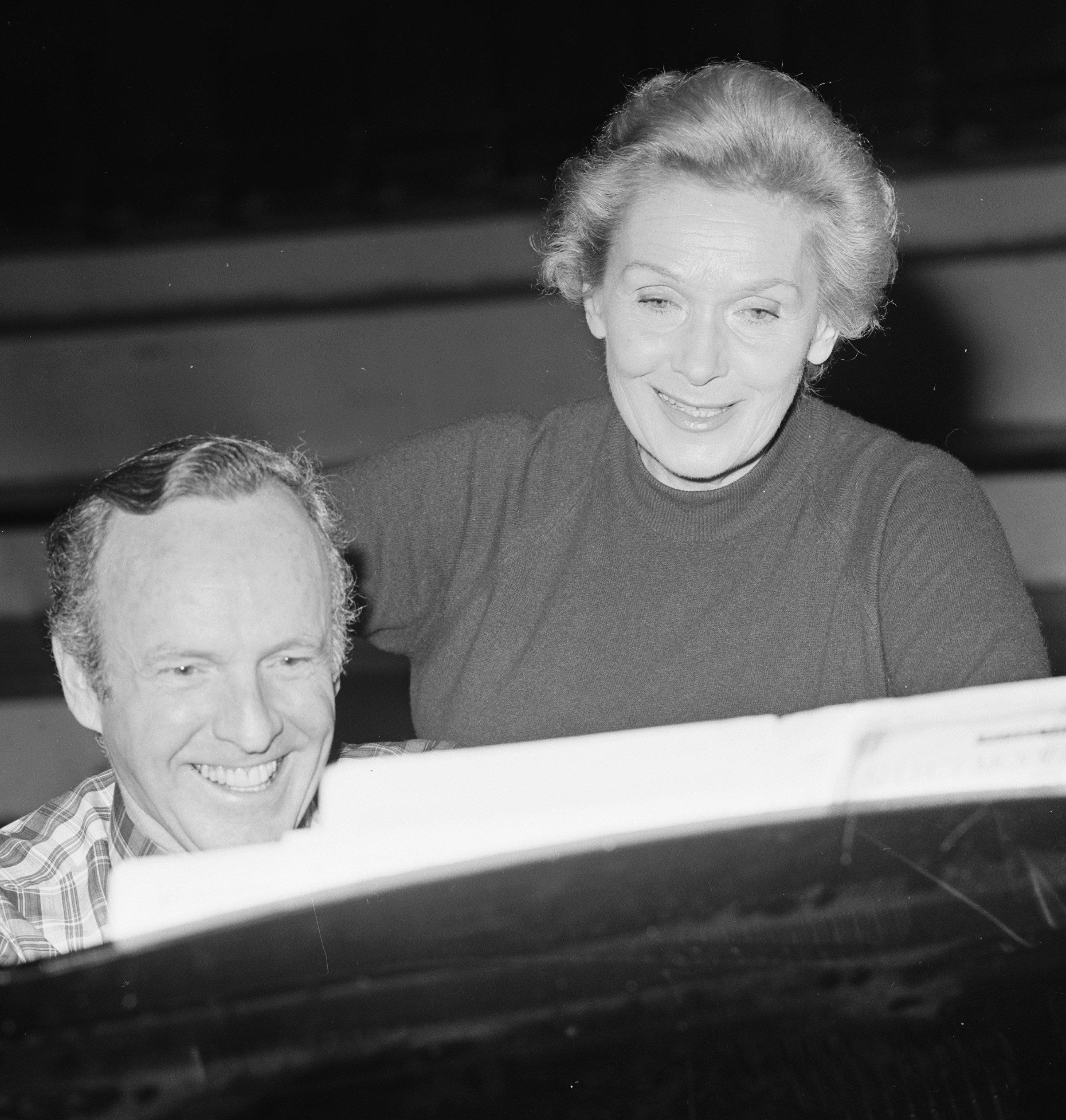
- Geoffrey Parsons accompanying Elisabeth Schwarzkopf (1977)

Background information
- Born: Geoffrey Penwill Parsons; 15 June 1929; Summer Hill, New South Wales, Australia
- Died: 26 January 1995 (aged 65) London, England, United Kingdom
- Education: New South Wales State Conservatorium of Music
- Genres: Classical
- Occupation: Musician
- Instruments: Piano
- Award: Royal Philharmonic Society Instrumentalist of the Year (1992)

Geoffrey Penwill Parsons (15 June 1929 – 26 January 1995) was an Australian classical pianist, most particularly notable as an accompanist to singers and instrumentalists. He was based in London from the age of 20, and toured internationally before returning back to Australia

After the retirement of Gerald Moore, Parsons was generally considered the world's finest and most sympathetic accompanist of lieder singers, "elevating the role of the accompanist to new heights in the 1950s with his musicality, authority and quiet strength of playing".

== Biography ==
Geoffrey Parsons was born in Summer Hill, New South Wales, a suburb Sydney, Australia, to a working-class family, his parents Francis Hedley Parsons and Edith Vera Buckland and had two older brothers and a large extended family. He originally intended to study architecture, but his love of music prevailed.

From 1941 to 1948 he studied with Winifred Burston (a student of Egon Petri and Ferruccio Busoni) at the NSW State Conservatorium of Music (where a family friend, George Vern Barnett, was on the piano staff) and under the general tutelage of Eugene Goossens. He won the ABC's Instrumental and Vocal Competition in 1947 with a performance of Brahms's Piano Concerto No. 2. He toured Australia with Essie Ackland in 1948, and in 1950 travelled to Britain to perform with bass baritone Peter Dawson.

The six-concert tour completed, Parsons remained in London, earning a living initially as a cocktail lounge pianist. This led to a series of engagements spanning five years with the duettists Anne Ziegler and Webster Booth, and permanent residence in Britain. While in London in 1950 he received some months of lessons from Gordon Watson, before deciding that he needed a different approach, as Watson concentrated on solo performing while Parsons was by now committed to the art of the accompanist.

A performance of Schubert's Winterreise with Gerhard Hüsch in his first London concert since World War II led to Parsons being invited to Munich to be Hüsch's permanent accompanist, where they worked together almost daily. There he studied with Friedrich Wührer in 1956.

In 1961, he made his first appearance with Elisabeth Schwarzkopf at the Royal Festival Hall at the invitation of Walter Legge, and later became her principal accompanist.

The list of singers with whom he worked included Victoria de los Ángeles, Nicolai Gedda, Christa Ludwig Birgit Nilsson,and Janet Baker.

Increasingly Parsons began to partner younger singers such as Thomas Hampson, Olaf Bär, Jessye Norman, Wolfgang Holzmair and some of these younger artists such as Susan Kessler, Yvonne Kenny, Felicity Lott and Ann Murray were also pupils of Parsons's long-time life partner, the singer Erich Vietheer.

Parsons also accompanied some instrumentalists, including violinist Nathan Milstein, Ruggiero Ricci and cellist Paul Tortelier, Wanda Wiłkomirska and Ida Haendel. Artists whom he partnered quickly appreciated his exemplary standards of musicianship, and a level of pianistic command that was totally new to the accompanist's role. This led to his increasing recognition as the ideal accompanist in a career that saw him perform in over 40 countries, in six continents, including all the major international music festivals. He also recorded widely throughout his career, leaving a vast output. He also partnered other pianists such as Leslie Howard, for example in works by Franz Liszt for two pianos, in which neither pianist is subordinate to the other.

His connection to Australia was an essential part of his entire career and he became the means for bringing some of the world's most important singers and instrumentalists to his native country. He toured Australia 31 times between 1957 and 1993.

In 1967 and 1969, he appeared as one of five harpsichordists, the others being Eileen Joyce, Simon Preston, George Malcolm (1967), and Raymond Leppard (1969), in concerts with the Academy of St Martin in the Fields under Neville Marriner. In 1969, he appeared with Eileen Joyce in a two-piano recital at Australia House, London.

In 1973 he accompanied Birgit Nilsson in the first lieder recital at the Sydney Opera House. He also accompanied Wanda Wiłkomirska in the first violin and piano recital in that venue. During his returns to Australia, he conducted several masterclasses at his alma mater, now the Sydney Conservatorium of Music.

On 29 November 1981, he again appeared with Eileen Joyce, in a fund-raising concert at the Royal Opera House, Covent Garden. Although not intended as such, this proved to be the last time Eileen Joyce ever played in public.

His last performance in Australia was with Olaf Bär in Winterreise in the University of Melbourne's Melba Hall in 1993.

He was appointed the inaugural Prince Consort Professor of Accompanying at the Royal College of Music in 1994 and was named a Fellow of the college (FRCM) in 1987. He became an honorary member of the Royal Academy of Music in 1975, and the Guildhall School of Music in 1983. He was named the Royal Philharmonic Society's Instrumentalist of the Year in 1992. He was appointed an Officer (OBE) of the Order of the British Empire in 1977 and an Officer (AO) of the Order of Australia in 1990.

Parsons was the inaugural patron of the Accompanists Guild of Queensland, Inc.

He shared his life and his home with the singer and teacher Erich Vietheer, who died in London on 15 May 1989, aged 59. Parsons lived his life as a Christian, committed to the Church of England.

On his retirement he was given his own gala concert at the Metropolitan Opera, New York.

He died in London from cancer on Australia Day, 26 January 1995, survived by his two brothers. His ashes were returned to Australia. In 2002 they were interred in a rural location outside Melbourne, marked by a stone monument and an epitaph he had helped write.

His 1972 portrait, by Michael Shannon, hangs in the National Portrait Gallery in Old Parliament House, Canberra. (Note: The archived web page of Geoffrey Parson's 1972 portrait by Michael Shannon in the National Gallery can be viewed in the Way Back Machine.) His 1957 photographic portrait by Max Dupain is held by the National Archives of Australia. (Note: The archived web page of Max Dupain on Assignment, which includes a 1957 portrait of Geoffrey Parsons, can be viewed in the Way Back Machine.) Collaborative pianist Graham Johnson wrote an article for The Guardian marking the 20th anniversary of Geoffrey Parson's death.

== Geoffrey Parsons Award ==
In 1995, following Parsons' death, the Geoffrey Parsons Award was named in his memory by the Accompanists' Guild of South Australia, of which Parsons was the founding international patron. The award is one of the few Australian prizes to celebrate and encourage the profession of piano accompaniment. The Geoffrey Parsons Award is an annual prize, originally with a cash-pool of $2,500. To mark the 25th anniversary of the Guild, in 2008 this was increased to $6,000.

In recent years, the prize has received the support of the Elder Conservatorium, University of Adelaide, which has given the prize an added level of prestige and public profile. In presenting the Geoffrey Parsons Award the Accompanists' Guild continues to raise the public's awareness of the importance of the skills of the professional accompanist and has assisted many emerging accompanists to establish their professional careers. The list of previous winners is published on the Guild's website.

== Geoffrey Parsons Memorial Trust ==
The Geoffrey Parsons Memorial Trust aimed to encourage the art of the accompanist amongst young pianists.

On Australia Day 2005, the tenth anniversary of Geoffrey Parsons' death, the Trust presented the Geoffrey Parsons 10th Anniversary Memorial Concert at London's Wigmore Hall. Yvonne Kenny, Sir Thomas Allen, and Graham Johnson all provided their services free of charge. The concert was reviewed in The Guardian newspaper.

The Trust operated as a charity between 1995 and 2013.

== Sources ==
- The Accompanists’ Guild of South Australia
- The Accompanists’ Guild of South Australia: About Geoffrey Parsons
- The Accompanists’ Guild of South Australia: The Geoffrey Parsons Award – Previous Winners
- Live Performance Australia Hall of Fame
- Music Council of Australia: Review by Jeanell Carrigan of Geoffrey Parsons: Among Friends by Richard Davis (archived from the original)
- National Portrait Gallery: Geoffrey Parsons (1972) by Michael Shannon (archived from the original)
- National Portrait Gallery: Geoffrey Parsons (1972) by Michael Shannon
- Allan and Unwin: Geoffrey Parsons – Among Friends
- Geoffrey Parsons: Among Friends by Richard Davis (Sydney: ABC Books, 2006) in State Library of Victoria collection
- *The University of Sydney: Geoffrey Parsons Memorial Concert
- National Archives of Australia” Max Dupain on Assignment (archived from the original)
- National Archives of Australia: ABC publicity photograph of Geoffrey Parsons by Max Dupain, 1957
- Seen and Heard International: Review of Geoffrey Parsons 10th Anniversary Memorial Concert by Melanie Eskenazi
- Answers.com: Geoffrey Parsons: Classical Musician
- Goliath: book review Geoffrey Parsons – Among Friends
- Hyperion: Franz Liszt: Fantasie und Fuge über den Choral Ad nos, ad salutarem undam, S624
- Australian Dictionary of Biography: Geoffrey Penwill Parsons (1929–1995) by John Carmody
