= Frank O'Donnell (actor) =

Australian actor

Francis Theodore O'Donnell (5 February 1907 – 4 August 1956) was an Australian actor. He performed in amateur theatre before the outbreak of war in 1939 but worked in professional theatre after the war.

== Biography ==
He was born in Sydney and educated at St Aloysius' College. During the Second World War, he served with the Second Australian Imperial Force.

O'Donnell performed in many productions directed by Doris Fitton at Sydney's Independent Theatre Company.

Franck O'Donnell achieved notice for his performance as Mac in Rusty Bugles, the controversial 1948 play by Sumner Locke Elliott. He was a permanent cast member as the production toured around Australia between 1948 and 1950. Alexander Macdonald wrote in Smith's Weekly about Frank's characterisation of the disgusting Mac, "all completely fantastic, but true as truth itself".

Rusty Bugles is considered pivotal in the history of twentieth-century Australian theatre. Julian Merrick in his book Australia in 50 Plays (Currency Press 2022) wrote that Rusty Bugles, along with The One Day of the Year and Summer of the Seventeenth Doll "are the three great pillars of mid-twentieth century Australian drama"(p94). A review in Smith's Weekly in 1950 spoke of Rusty Bugles as the first great Australian play. "Rusty Bugles is the first Australian play in which the characters portrayed really have a national character and way of life. Women who wonder what their husbands and fiances talked about when they were away should definitely see this play. In fact, it gives the best chance they will ever get for hearing for about two-and-a-half hours the genuine converse of man to man when ladies aren't present."

Frank O'Donnell's two uncles, Jack O'Donnell and Iggy O'Donnell, were influential Australian rugby players who earned the distinction of being the first two brothers to represent Australia. Frank's nephew, Peter O'Donnell, was a prominent sailor and winner of an Olympic gold medal at the Tokyo Olympics in 1964. His son John D'Arcy O'Donnell was also educated at St Aloysius' College and later at Sydney University where he graduated as medical practitioner in 1970. John is best known for his work in the media where he goes by the screen name of Dr John D'Arcy; he worked first as a presenter on Beyond 2000 Towards 2000 and later as the first medical practitioner appointed to an Australian newsroom and continues as ‘medical editor’ for The Seven Network's Sunrise program.

Frank O'Donnell died in Sydney in 1956, age 49.
