= Ronald McKenzie (disambiguation) =

Ronald McKenzie (1883–1954) was a Scottish footballer.

Ronald McKenzie or similar may also refer to:

- Ronald Mackenzie (c. 1903–1932), Scottish dramatist
- Ronald MacKenzie (1934–2020), American attorney and politician
- Ron McKenzie (footballer) (born 1930), Australian rules footballer
- Ron McKenzie (tennis) (fl. 1940–1960), New Zealand tennis player
