= Independent Theatre =

Theatre company in Sydney, Australia

Independent Theatre, formerly known as The Independent Theatre Ltd., was an Australian dramatic society founded in 1930 by (later Dame) Doris Fitton in Sydney, Australia. It is also the name given to the building it occupied from 1939 (then known as the Coliseum Theatre), now owned by Wenona School, in North Sydney, cited as Sydney's oldest live theatre venue.

== History ==
The society was named for London's Independent Theatre Society founded by J. T. Grein and was one of several amateur drama groups of high standard which sprang up in Sydney in the 1930s to fill the gap left by the closure of all but two professional theatres (the last spoken-word theatre to close was The Criterion theatre in 1936, leaving only the Tivoli, which ran vaudeville, and the Theatre Royal, which played musicals and ballets). The range of plays essayed was impressive – from classics to avant-garde pieces, from recent West End and Broadway successes (sometimes the Australian premiere) to offerings from local dramatists. The death of Fitton's co-producer Peter Summerton in 1969 put extra strain on her deteriorating health, and with no-one able or willing to fill her shoes, the Independent closed in 1977.

In the 1990s, in serious disrepair, the theatre, Sydney's oldest, was bought by Rodney Seaborn's Seaborn, Broughton & Walford Foundation, and reopened in 1998. In 2004 it was acquired by the Australian Elizabethan Theatre Trust.

As of 2022 the Independent Theatre operates in North Sydney, in the building opened as the Coliseum Theatre in 1939, run by Wenona School.

== Venues ==
Initially, Fitton's company rehearsed and played in St James' Hall. From 1931, most performances were given in The Savoy, a small single-floor cinema on Bligh Street, chiefly on Wednesday and Saturday, movies being shown on other nights. For some productions, the much larger Sydney Conservatorium of Music was hired. It would have made an ideal home for the club, but was not available for regular hire. In 1937 Fitton came to an arrangement with the Sydney Players' Club that they would share Savoy Saturday nights: five weeks for The Independent and three for the Players. But after the Players' Club had cancelled their lease of St James' Hall, the management of The Savoy evicted them both in order to become purely a cinema.

It had been intended to move to the much larger Palace Theatre, 255(?) Pitt Street, at the end of 1932 (it had been used throughout August 1931 for a particularly popular production), but that never eventuated. (It became a venue for "minnie" golf instead!)

The new clubrooms upstairs at 175 Pitt Street served as an occasional performance space from September 1938 to September 1939.

In 1938 the company took a two-year lease over the old Criterion (which was originally a cable winding station for the cable trams), at 269–271 Miller Street, North Sydney (near Ridge Street), which had been made available by the collapse of the Kursaal Theatre Group. For a time they were running two productions in parallel: at Pitt Street and at their new premises, renamed "The Independent"; by September 1939 the move was complete. The building was owned by North Sydney Coliseum Company, who in 1947 made moves to sell the building. Funds were raised for its purchase. The venue on Miller Street has a seating capacity of 289. by 1977 it had become the 680 Playhouse.

== Clubrooms ==
Clubrooms are used for read-throughs of plays, training and rehearsals other than full dress rehearsals to save the expense of theatre hire. Often they would be made available to other groups and community organizations. They may also be used for storage, maintenance and sometimes even preparation of programmes, scenery, props and costumes. Fitton first rented rooms for this purpose in 1933 at 60 King St then moved to 112 King St in early 1934. and were still there in 1938 when the building was destroyed by fire. They rented the first floor (US second floor) of "Club Chambers" at 175 Pitt St from July 1938 to mid-1939 when they took over the Coliseum and there was no need for a separate facility.

== Performances ==
Fitton was usually producer and director, and frequently leading lady, and in each of these roles won praise from the critics. Dame Sybil Thorndike is recorded as saying of The Independent "It is too good to be judged by the standards of the amateur stage." The list below exemplifies the range and standard of plays performed.

In 1942 The Independent embarked on a joint management arrangement with Alec Coppel's Whitehall Productions which entailed nightly professional presentations, alternating seasons with the Minerva Theatre across the other side of the city. The scheme was abandoned after one month due to poor weekday attendances.

In 1944 they played at the newly opened American Red Cross Club at Kensington.

On 19 September 1944, the building narrowly escaped destruction when the adjacent building, previously the De Luxe Theatre but then used by the Army as a store, caught fire. Newspaper reports of hand grenades and bombs being hastily removed were denied by officials.

Initially amateur, "The Indi" started paying award rates to a nucleus of leading players from May 1955. Those selected included Marie Rosenfeld, Ethel Gabriel, Jessica Noad, Molly Brown, Haydee Seldon, Leonard Bullen, John Carlson and Grenville Spencer. Fitton's intended six shows a week was soon cut to three in the face of inadequate rehearsal time.

In 1948 John Alden used "The Independent" as home for his fledgling Shakespeare Company. Other groups to use "The Independent" at various times were the Independent Theatre School of Stagecraft, Heather Gell Productions, Lesley Bowker's Reiby Players and the Liberal Youth Club's Dramatic Group.

== Selected productions ==
Note: This list is incomplete and only dramatic productions by The Independent Theatre are listed. Most are opening nights with no indication of successive performances if any. It includes very few of the many evenings of one-act plays (including finalists of their annual play-writing contests) and matinees. Where no producer is credited, it may be assumed to have been Doris Fitton.

=== At St James' Hall, Phillip Street ===
- 6 Aug 1930 – By Candlelight (dir. Harry Tighe)
- 8 Oct 1930 – The Marquise
- 12 Nov 1930 – The Queen Was in Her Parlour

=== At Savoy Theatre, Bligh Street (unless otherwise indicated) ===
- 7 Jan 1931 – Michael and Mary
- 21 Feb 1931 – The Silver Cord
- 21 Mar 1931 – And So To Bed by J. B. Fagan
- 2 May 1931 – Hindle Wakes
- 23 May 1931 – By Candlelight
- 27 Jun 1931 – The Constant Nymph (from 8 Aug at Palace Theatre)
- 12 Sep 1931 – The Second Man
- 21 Nov 1931 – Street Scene
- 5 Dec 1931 – The Shadow of the Glen & A Kiss for Cinderella
- 6 Feb 1932 – The Middle Watch by Ian Hay
- 16 Apr 1932 – At Mrs Beam's by "C. K. Munro"
- 23 Apr 1932 – Othello
- 21 May 1932 – A Circle of Chalk
- 4 Jun 1932 – The Constant Nymph
- 2 Jul 1932 – The Young Idea
- 6 Aug 1932 – The Great Broxopp by A. A. Milne
- 17 Sep 1932 – Disraeli
- 15 Oct 1932 – The Merchant of Venice
- 5 Nov 1932 – Mrs. Moonlight
- 10 Dec 1932 – Take Two from One by G and M Martinez Sierra
- 13 Jan 1933 – Peter Pan
- 14 Jan 1933 – The School for Scandal
- 18 Feb 1933 – Caprice
- 18 Mar 1933 – Precious Bane by Mary Webb
- 13 May 1933 – Petticoat Influence by Neil F. Grant
- 3 Jun 1933 – London Wall by John Van Druten
- 8 Jul 1933 – Once in a Lifetime
- 2 Sep 1933 – Musical Chairs by Ronald Mackenzie
- 7 Oct 1933 – The Ship of Heaven by Hugh McCrae and Alfred Hill (Australian premiere)
- 11 Nov 1933 – When Half-Gods Go by Charles Edgbaston and R. J. Fletcher (winner of Independent Theatre play writing contest)
- 18 Nov 1933 – Strange Orchestra
- Peter Pan
- 3 Feb 1934 – Children in Uniform
- 14 Feb 1934 – Hoboes All, The Four Poster, The Missing Jewels, The Fatal Year (by C. Hansby Read, Dora Wilcox, W. H. Moroney and C. Hansby Read, resp., winners of The Independent's 1933 one-act playwriting contest)
- 17 Mar 1934 – Springtime for Henry
- 14 Feb 1934 – Dangerous Corner
- 26 May 1934 – The Marquise (prod. George Blackwood)
- 7 Jul 1934 – The Fugitive
- 5 Aug 1934 – The Plough and the Stars
- 31 Aug 1934 – The Rose Without a Thorn
- 18 Sep 1934 – Children in Uniform
- 20 Oct 1934 – Alice Sit-by-the-Fire
- 24 Nov 1934 – Counsellor at Law
- 5 Dec 1934 – Cherrie Acres by Dorothea Tobin
- 12 Dec 1934 – Outward Bound
- 19 Jan 1935 – And So To Bed
- 16 Feb 1935 – The Witch (prod. Betty Ward)
- 16 Mar 1935 – Dulcy
- 24 Apr 1935 – Anniversary (by Dymphna Cusack) at Sydney Conservatorium of Music
- 27 Apr 1935 – The Distaff Side
- 25 May 1935 – False Colours by Frank Harvey) (prod. William Rees)
- 22 Jun 1935 – The Apple Cart
- 20 Jul 1935 – Squaring the Circle
- 10 Aug 1935 – Richard of Bordeaux
- 28 Sep 1935 – The Improper Duchess
- 26 Oct 1935 – The Late Christopher Bean
- 11 Jan 1936 – Lady Precious Stream
- 18 Jan 1936 – Street Scene
- 29 Feb 1936 – Touch Wood
- 4 Apr 1936 – The Enchanted Cottage
- 25 Apr 1936 – The Dybbuk
- 13 May 1936 – The Man with a Load of Mischief
- 30 May 1936 – Payment Deferred
- 20 Jun 1936 – The Black Eye
- 25 Jul 1936 – The Importance of Being Earnest
- 5 Aug 1936 – The Witch
- 28 Aug 1936 – Companionate Divorce by Mrs Peter Bousfield
- 5 Sep 1936 – The Three Sisters
- 3 Oct 1936 – The Royal Family of Broadway (with Jean Innes)
- 31 Oct 1936 – Accent on Youth
- 21 Nov 1936 – Awake and Sing
- 12 Dec 1936 – Peter Pan (matinee)
- 23 Jan 1937 – Indoor Fireworks by Arthur McCrae
- 13 Mar 1937 – Hassan

=== Homeless! (various venues) ===
- 1 May 1937 – Hide-out by Rex Rienits and Stewart Howard (prod. John Alden and Lyn Foster) at King Street
- 8 May 1937 – One-act plays by George Cassidy, Sumner Locke Elliott, John Alden, Trafford Whitelock at clubrooms, King Street
- 15 May 1937 – The Sybarites by H. Dennis Bradley at clubrooms, King Street
- 11 Jun 1937 – Noah at Sydney Conservatorium of Music
- 24 Jul 1937 – Pride and Prejudice adapted by Helen Jerome at Sydney Conservatorium of Music
- 14 Aug 1937 – Much Ado About Nothing at clubrooms, King Street
- 11 Sep 1937 Candida at Sydney Conservatorium of Music
- 30 Sep 1937 – There's Always Juliet (prod. Brian Wright) at clubrooms, King Street
- 2 Oct 1937 – Le Malade Imaginaire at clubrooms, King Street
- 30 Oct 1937 – The Cow Jumped Over the Moon (Sumner Locke Elliott writer and producer) at clubrooms, King Street
- 13 Nov 1937 – Boy Meets Girl at Sydney Conservatorium of Music
- 24 Nov 1937 – No Incense Rising & Remains to Be Proved (winners of Independent play-writing competition) at Sydney Conservatorium of Music
- 8 Dec 1937 – The Play's the Thing at clubrooms, King Street
- 1 Jan 1937 – Peter Pan at Majestic Theatre, Newtown
- 8 Jan 1938 – Mirage by Kenneth Wilkinson at clubrooms, King Street
- 21 Feb 1838 – 1066 and All That at Sydney Conservatorium of Music
- 12 Mar 1938 – Six Characters in Search of an Author at clubrooms, King Street
- 2 Apr 1938 – Lovers' Leap by Phillip Johnson at clubrooms, King Street
- 29 Apr 1938 – 1066 and All That at Sydney Conservatorium of Music
- 14 May 1938 – Judgment Day (prod. Doris Fitton and John Appleton) at Sydney Conservatorium of Music
- 28 May 1938 – The Play's the Thing at clubrooms, King Street
- 11 Jun 1938 – Call It a Day
- 16 Jul 1938 – You Can't Take It with You at clubrooms, King Street

=== At Independent Theatre Clubrooms, 175 Pitt Street (often called simply Independent Theatre) (unless otherwise indicated) ===
- 13 Aug 1938 – Winterset at Sydney Conservatorium of Music
- 3 Sep 1938 You Can't Take It with You
- 15 Sep 1938 – By Candlelight
- 21 Sep 1938 – The Playboy of the Western World
- 1 Oct 1938 – Housemaster (by Ian Hay) at Sydney Conservatorium of Music
- 29 Oct 1938 – The Guardsman
- 26 Nov 1938 – Time and the Conways at the Sydney Conservatorium of Music
- 10 Dec 1938 – Shadows in the High Place by Laurel Mills
- 17 Dec 1938 – The Folly of It by W. I. Grenville Spencer and Sumner Locke Elliott
- 7 Jan 1939 – The Shadow of a Gunman
- 7 Jan 1939 – You Can't Take It with You at Criterion Theatre
- 23 Jan 1939 – The Guardsman at Criterion Theatre
- 8 Feb 1939 – Housemaster at Criterion Theatre
- 11 Feb 1939 – Tovarich (prod. Betty Ward) at Sydney Conservatorium of Music
- 8 Mar 1939 – French Without Tears
- 18 Mar 1939 – The Play's the Thing
- 1 Apr 1939 – Interval by Sumner Locke Elliott
- 10 May 1939 – Baisers Perdus
- 10 Jun 1939 – The Merry Wives of Windsor
- 3 Jun 1939 – 1066 and All That at Sydney Conservatorium of Music
- 7 Jun 1939 – Baisers Perdus
- 8 Jul 1939 – There Is No Armour by Lynn Foster
- 22 Jul 1939 – Shall I Go to Tanganyika by A. G. Macdonell (prod. Eric Scott)
- 5 Aug 1939 – Dear Octopus
- 27 Aug 1939 – Daybreak by Catherine Shepherd

=== At Independent Theatre, 269 Miller St, North Sydney ===
- 2 Sep 1939 – French Without Tears (opening of new theatre)
- 23 Sep 1939 – Molière The Imaginary Invalid
- 7 Oct 1939 – You Can't Take It with You
- 14 Oct 1939 – Once in a Lifetime
- 4 Nov 1939 – The Play's the Thing
- 25 Nov 1939 – Milestones
- 16 Dec 1939 Alice in Wonderland
- 6 Jan 1940 – Interval (Sumner Locke Elliott writer and producer)
- 20 Jan 1940 – Anthony and Anna
- 10 Feb 1940 – Our Town (Australian premiere)
- 23 Mar 1940 – Amphitryon 38
- 13 Apr 1940 – The Corn Is Green
- 18 May 1940 – The Little Sheep Run Fast (Sumner Locke Elliott writer and co-prod. with Richard Parry)
- 15 Jun 1940 – Biography (Doris Fitton (co-prod. with Richard Parry)
- 13 Jul 1940 – The Tempest
- 27 Jul 1940 – The Importance of Being Earnest
- 24 Aug 1940 – You Can’t Take It With You
- 31 Aug 1940 – Ask No Questions by Gwen Meredith
- 28 Sep 1940 – Penny Wise by Leslie Vyner and Mary Stafford Smith (prod. Richard Parry)
- 9 Nov 1940 – A Man's House
- 14 Dec 1940 – Lady Precious Stream
- 21 Dec 1940 – Painted Sparrows by Guy Paxton and Edward V. Hoile
- 1 Feb 1941 – The Life of the Insects
- 26 Feb 1941 – The Long Christmas Dinner
- 15 Mar 1941 – Thunder Rock
- 26 Apr 1941 – George and Margaret
- 17 May 1941 – The Male Animal
- 28 Jun 1941 – Juno and the Paycock
- 2 Aug 1941 – The House in the Square
- 13 Sep 1941 – A Little Bit of Fluff by Walter W. Ellis (prod. G. F. Hole and O. D. Bisset)
- 27 Sep 1941 – Saint Joan
- 15 Nov 1941 – The Royal Family of Broadway
- 13 Dec 1941 – The Children's Hour
- 3 Jan 1942 – A Kiss for Cinderella
- 17 Jan 1942 – Shout at the Thunder by Gwen Meredith
- 14 Feb 1942 – Penny Wise
- 28 Feb 1942 – Lady in Danger by Max Afford
- 4 Apr 1942 – Press Gang by Margaret Pearson
- 2 May 1942 – Getting Married

=== Under joint management with Whitehall Productions ===
- 6 Jun 1942 – Spring Meeting by M. J. Farrell and John Perry (thence to Minerva)
- 20 Jun 1942 – The Importance of Being Earnest (from Minerva)

=== Back to amateur productions ===
- 6 Jul 1942 – Dear Brutus
- 7 Aug 1942 – Busman's Holiday by Dorothy L. Sayers
- 12 Sep 1942 – Goodbye to the Music
- 7 Oct 1942 – The Merchant of Venice (season included Monday matinees at Theatre Royal)
- 17 Oct 1942 – Macbeth (season included Monday matinees at Theatre Royal)
- 6 Nov 1942 – The Children's Hour
- 12 Dec 1942 – Toad of Toad Hall
- 15 Jan 1943 – The Seagull
- 19 Feb 1943 – Yellow Sands
- 19 Mar 1943 – Glorious Morning by Norman MacOwan
- 16 Apr 1943 – The Marquise by Noël Coward
- 21 May 1943 – The Time of Your Life
- 18 Jun 1943 – Sleep No More by Max Afford
- 16 Jul 1943 – And So to Bed by J. B. Fagan
- 3 Sep 1943 – Stage Door by George S. Kaufman
- 23 Oct 1943 – Hamlet
- 10 Nov 1943 – Tobacco Road (in December this production continued at Minerva for Whitehall Productions)
- 4 Dec 1943 – Your Obedient Servant by Sumner Locke Elliott
- 7 Jan 1944 – Caprice by Sil-Vara
- 4 Feb 1944 – Tobacco Road
- 10 Mar 1944 – Dandy Dick
- 14 Apr 1944 – Madchen [sic] in Uniform by Christa Winsloe
- 12 May 1944 – Death Takes a Holiday
- 14 Jul 1944 – Oscar Wilde by Leslie and Sewell Stokes
- 8 Aug 1944 – Hay Fever (performed concurrently by Independent students)
- 28 Sep 1944 – The Play's the Thing
- 26 Oct 1944 – Old Acquaintance by John Van Druten
- 30 Nov 1944 – Young Woodley by John Van Druten
- 21 Dec 1944 – Tonight at 8.30 (three one-act plays by Noël Coward)
- 28 Dec 1944 – The Cherry Orchard
- 8 Mar 1945 – Timeless Moment by Noel Rubie
- 22 Mar 1945 – Death Takes a Holiday
- 10 Apr 1945 – Little Ladyship by Ian Hay
- 10 May 1945 – The Cherry Orchard
- 22 May 1945 – The Doctor's Dilemma (first production of Independent Theatre Professional Repertory Company)
- 12 Jun 1945 – End of Summer by S. N. Behrman
- 3 Jul 1945 – These Positions Vacant by Gwen Meredith (prod. John Alden)
- 25 Jul 1945 – Romeo and Juliet
- 15 Aug 1945 – The Long Mirror by J. B. Priestley
- 4 Sep 1945 – Noah by André Obey
- 16 Oct 1945 – Macbeth
- 27 Dec 1945 – Mourning Becomes Electra prod. Robert Quentin
- 23 Mar 1946 – Whiteoaks (prod. John Alden)
- 30 May 1946 – The Invisible Circus by Sumner Locke Elliott, prod. John Carlson
- 8 Jul 1946 – Hamlet (prod. Doris Fitton)
- 23 Oct 1946 – A Doll's House by Henrik Ibsen, prod. John Carlson
- 1 Dec 1946 – Maria Stuart (prod. Raoul Cardamatis)
- 14 Feb 1947 – Antigone (prod. William Rees)
- 3 Apr 1947 – Volpone adaptation of Ben Jonson's play by Alphons Silbermann (prod. Doris Fitton)
- 5 Sep 1947 – Awake My Love by Max Afford
- 20 Oct 1947 – The Little Foxes by Lillian Hellman (prod. Robert Quentin)
- 6 Feb 1948 – I Have Been Here Before (prod. Laurence H Cecil)
- 3 July 1948 – Jane Clegg
- 9 Oct 1948 – La Marquise (prod. Doris Fitton)
- 6 Oct 1948 – The Duchess of Malfi
- 14 Oct 1948 – Rusty Bugles (Sumner Locke Elliott writer and producer)

(Doris Fitton overseas May 1949 to March 1950; spent much time attempting London production of Rusty Bugles)

- 12 May 1949 – Father Malachy's Miracle (prod. James Pratt)
- 19 Mar 1949 – Merry Wives of Windsor (prod. John Alden)
- 23 Jun 1949 – The Male Animal (prod. John Cameron)
- The Residuary Legatee
- Amphitryon 38
- 2 Sep 1949 – Mandragola (prod. Adrian Henry Borzell)
- 28 Oct 1949 – Salome (prod. Dr. Raoul Cardamatis)
- 9 Nov 1949 – A Marriage of Convenience (prod. William Rees)

=== 1950s ===
- 14 Jun 1950 – Dark of the Moon
- Feb 1950? – The Sunken Bell (prod. Dr. Raoul Cardamatis)
- 6 Apr 1950 – The Glencairn Plays: Bound East for Cardiff, In the Zone, The Long Voyage Home, Moon of the Carribees by Eugene O’Neill (prod. Lawrence H. Cecil )
- 6 Sep 1950 – Orney Boy
- 7 Oct 1950 – Julius Caesar (prod. Lawrence H. Cecil)
- 18 Oct 1950 – Home of the Brave
- 27 Dec 1950 – Just For Fun
- 7 Mar 1951 – Anna Lucasta
- 7 Feb 1952 – Ardel
- 23 Apr 1952 – Black Chiffon
- 15 May 1952 – It All Takes Time (prod. John Appleton)
- Captain Carvallo
- Henry V
- 26 May 1954 – The Cradle Song
- Apr 1956 - Cornerstone by Gwen Meredith
- Sept 1956 - Naked Possum by Barbara Vernon
- Sept 1956 - Adventures of Kathy Kanga by Donald Bamford
- Nov 1956 - Waters of the Moon
- Jan 1957 - The Prisoner
- Sept 1957 - The Round House
- Oct 1957 - Nex' Town (Australian musical)
- Nov 1957 - The Lark
- May 1958 - The Bunyip and the Satellite
- Sept 1958 - Murder Story
- Dec 1958 - Pirates at the Barn
- 1959 - A View From the Bridge

=== 1960s ===
- September 1960 - Hunger of a Girl (filmed as Jenny)
- Sept 1962 - The Grotto by Robert Wales
- Dec 1962 - Daughter of Silence by Morris West
- Feb 1963 - Gods of Red Earth by Coral Lansbury
- Sept 1963 - The Fire on the Snow by Douglas Stewart
- Aug 1964 - Rusty Bugles
- Feb 1966 - The Cell
- Apri 1966 - Muriel's Vines by Peter Kenna
- Dec 1967 - Halloran's Little Boat by Thomas Keneally
- Jul 1969 - Eden House by Hal Porter

=== 1970s ===
- Mar 1971 - Stockade by Kenneth Cook
- Jul 1976 – Snap by Charles Laurence

== Pickwick Theatre Group ==
Among foundation members of the Independent were Dorise Hill and Phillip Lewis, who in 1931 broke away to form the short-lived Pickwick Theatre Group, associated with the Pickwick Book Club of 156 Pitt Street, Sydney. They held a reception for Sybil Thorndike and Lewis Casson in September 1932, at which members of the Independent Theatre were conspicuously absent. Early in December 1932 Phillip Lewis took full control of the club then a fortnight later disbanded it. He died in 1950, aged 47. Mrs Albert Cazabon (aka Norah Delaney) and Joy Howarth were notable actors associated with the Pickwick group, whose productions (all at the Savoy Theatre) were:

- The Truth Game
- Rope
- Cynara
- The Vortex
- Good Morning Bill
- Baa, Baa, Black Sheep
- The Constant Wife
- The Lilies of the Field
- Loose Ankles
- See Naples and Die
- Alibi
- Leave It to Psmith.

== Sources ==
- History of Australian Theatre - archive
- West, John Theatre in Australia Cassell Australia 1978 ISBN 0-7269-9266-6
