= Frank O'Donnell =

Frank O'Donnell may refer to:

- Frank O'Donnell (footballer) (1911–1952), Scottish professional footballer
- Frank O'Donnell (actor) (1907–1956), Australian actor
- Frank A. O'Donnel (1852–1906), New York politician
- Frank Hugh O'Donnell (1846–1916), Irish nationalist writer and politician
- Frank J. Hugh O'Donnell (1894–1976), Irish critic, playwright and politician
- Francis Martin O'Donnell (born 1954), Irish and international diplomat, Ambassador of the Sovereign Order of Malta to Slovakia and retired former UN Resident Coordinator
