= Careful, He Might Hear You =

Careful, He Might Hear You may refer to:

- Careful, He Might Hear You (novel), a 1963 novel by Sumner Locke Elliott
- Careful, He Might Hear You (film), a 1983 Australian drama film, based on the novel
