= John Kingsmill (author) =

Australian author, actor and public speaker

John Kingsmill (1 September 1920 – 6 August 2013) was an Australian author, actor and public speaker, and amateur social historian. He was born in Sydney in 1920 and educated at Sydney Boys High School. He was on active service in World War II, after which he completed his accountancy studies and was in practice for some years. He achieved notice for his performance as Des Nolan (Gig) in Rusty Bugles, the controversial 1948 play by Sumner Locke Elliott. In 1955, he was a founding member of the Psychiatric Rehabilitation Association (Australia), and was its leader for several years, serving on its Board until 1984. During the 1970s he worked as a senior advertising copywriter at the George Patterson advertising agency Sydney office.

== Bibliography ==
- No Hero: memoirs of a raw recruit in World War II, Hale and Iremonger, Sydney, 1994 ISBN 0-86806-535-8
- Australia Street: a boy's eye view of the 1920s and 1930s, Hale & Iremonger, 1991 ISBN 0-86806-440-8
- The Innocent: Growing up in Bondi in the 1920s and 1930s, Collins/Angus & Robertson, 1990 ISBN 0-207-16599-8
- Sydney: The Harbour City, text John Kingsmill, paintings Jeff Rigby, Pierson & Co., 1988 ISBN 0-947068-07-4
- My Brief Strut upon the Stage, Jacobyte Books, 2001 ISBN 1-74053-083-7
- Dancing with the Patients: how PRA began, 2005 ISBN 978-0-646-51435-2
- A Speaker Silenced, 2006 ISBN 0-646-45510-9
- A Guide for Speechmakers, 2006 ISBN 0-646-45511-7
