= Ron McKenzie =

Ron McKenzie may refer to:

- Ron McKenzie (footballer) (born 1930), Australian footballer
- Ron McKenzie (tennis), New Zealand tennis player
