= Buy Me Blue Ribbons =

Play by Sumner Locke Elliott

- Playbill cover
- Written by: Sumner Locke Elliott
- Original language: English
- Subject: show business
- Genre: farce
- Setting: An apartment on Park Avenue, New York

Premiere
- Date premiered: 17 October 1951
- Place premiered: Empire Theatre, New York

Buy Me Blue Ribbons was a 1951 play by Australian writer Sumner Locke Elliott. It was one of the few Broadway plays to be written by an Australian.

== Premise ==
Jordan Sable, an ex child movie star, tries to buy himself a role in a play through producing the stage play Sounding Brass, written by Professor Oscar Nimrod, on Broadway. However Sable's behaviour is so chaotic he is fired from his own production.

== Background ==
The original production was co produced by the actor Jay Robinson, who also appeared in the cast.

The plot of the play was based on an idea of Robinson's involving a Broadway revival of The Green Bay Tree involving Robinson: he financed the play to get a role but was fired from the production. Robinson raised $50,000 from his father to finance the production of Buy Me Blue Ribbons as well. Cyril Ritchard directed.

== Reception ==
The play was not well received critically ("merciless" according to Robinson) and only ran 13 performances.

A review of the Broadway production in Time magazine said, "the play does have a certain breeziness and three talented comediennes", but it added that those characteristicse were not enough to offset "a sagging play and an actor who keeps spoiling his jokes."

Critic Walter Kerr later said:

The play which Mr. Elliott had supplied wasn't too bad as a stock enterprise. It moved with relatively little awkwardness, it handled its stereotyped show-business characters with an ease born of familiarity, it had a few bright lines. But whatever small praise might have been eked out for the play was shot to pieces the min¬ ute Mr. Robinson entered it.

Variety said "the whole affair seems tasteless and a bit embarrasing."

Elliott said, "After a flop I like to take the bad taste out of my mouth by starting a new play. I'm not really disappointed. If we had had a great star in the leading role and if I had thought the play was great, this would have driven me into the ground. It would have taken a year to .get over it. As it is, I'm through with plays about the theatre. My next will be aimed at a wider audience." Robinson's father never recovered from his financial losses on the production.

== Other productions ==
The play was produced in Sydney at the Independent Theatre in 1953.

Reviewing this the ABC Weekly wrote "Every playwright sooner or later writes a play about the theatre. It’s not a bad idea to get it out of your system early, and, having written it, it is sometimes a still better idea to put it in the bottom drawer and leave it there. Mr. Locke-Elliott’s attempt is as good as most plays that I have seen of this kind, and, though it limps along rather badly towards the end, it shows a good deal of technical skill and a nice sense of comedy. "

The play received a number of other productions, including one in San Francisco starring Robinson in 1958.

== 1954 television adaptation ==
The 1954 television adaptation of the play was an episode of the Goodyear Playhouse. It was directed by Arthur Penn with a cast including Roddy McDowall.

Variety wrote "Roddy McDowall did himself proud in the lead part, playing It with a mixture of gusto and understanding... Penn directed in crackerjack fashion. Show had plenty of pace and Imagination and a little pathos, too. Opening sequences, a takeoff on the early talkies, were a howl... one of the best of the Elliott scripts. There were plenty of laughs and a thoughtful and charming ending."

== 1956 British television adaptation ==
The play was filmed for British television in 1956.

== Notes ==
- Clarke, Sharon (1995). Sumner Locke Elliott: writing life. University of Woollongong. pp. 359–373.
- Robinson, Jay (1979). The comeback.
