= Edens Lost =

- Genre: Drama
- Written by: Michael Gow
- Directed by: Neil Armfield
- Starring: Julia Blake; Arthur Dignam; Linda Cropper
- Countries of origin: United Kingdom; Australia
- Original language: English
- No. of episodes: 3

Production
- Executive producers: Joseph Skrzynski; Ted Childs
- Producer: Margaret Fink
- Running time: 3 x 1 hours
- Production companies: ABC Productions; Central Independent Television

Original release
- Network: ITV
- Release: 16 December – 17 December 1988
- Network: ABC
- Release: 28 February 1989

Edens Lost is a 1988 British/Australian mini-series based on the novel of the same title by Sumner Locke Elliott, produced by Australian Broadcasting Corporation (ABC) and Central Independent Television.

Gillian Armstrong and Margaret Fink had planned to make a film version in the late 70s.

The budget was $A3.9 million.

== Cast ==
- Julia Blake as Eve
- Arthur Dignam as Heath
- Linda Cropper as Stevie
- Victoria Longley as Bea
- Bruce Hughes as Angus
- Jennifer Claire as Cissie
- Melanie Salomon as Lesley-Ann
- Fiona Press as Liesl
- Yves Stening as Tip
- Andrew Tighe as Bill Seward
- Pat Bishop as Muffet
- Patrick Quinn as Corey
- Philip Sayer as Marcus
- Edward Wiley as Gabriel
- Betty Bobbitt as Mabel
