= Pickwick Book Club =

Private library and club in Sydney, Australia

The Pickwick Book Club (also known as the Pickwick Club) was a private library and club established in 1928 by Dorise Elaine Hill (later Neylon) ( - 20 January 1953) in Sydney. It was the only combined library and club in Sydney and, in 1936, was the first business to sign up as an occupant of the newly completed heritage listed City Mutual Life Assurance Building.

== Library and club ==
Assisted by friends, Hill covered 200 books before opening her library to members. She later expanded the library to increase the collection and include facilities provided by a private club, including a ball room and a restaurant. During the day, members would visit to have lunch, read or play cards. In the evening it became a venue for balls, receptions, private parties, social events and at least one wedding ceremony. In its years of operation, over 5,000 wedding receptions took place at the Pickwick Book Club.

== Dorise Hill ==
Hill was the eldest daughter of Roland Hill and Caroline Mary Hill ( - 25 January 1942) who had three daughters and two sons. She was a business woman, avid reader and involved in the performing arts. She established the library to meet a need she perceived within the community.

Hill was a foundation member of the Independent Theatre and between 1931 - 1932, the Pickwick Book Club further expanded with the establishment of the Pickwick Theatre Group by Hill and Phillip Lewis. The group put on numerous productions at the Savoy Theatre during 1930 - 1931 and continued to put on small productions on the tiny stage in the ballroom in the club.

She was regular contributor to the Truth writing book reviews in a column called "Books Worth Reading".

Following Hill's marriage to Michael Neylon ( - 1949) in July 1947, her brother-in-law Robert Milne Stephen ( - 1965), who became known as "Mr Pickwick", took over the management of business. At her death in 1953, Hill left the Pickwick Book Club to her sister Dulcie May Stephen. The club continued to operate until September 1969.

At the time of its closure, the club had 900 members. Despite the end of the Pickwick Book Club, the venue remained available as a venue for wedding receptions and evening parties.

== Locations ==
Initially situated in Her Majesty's Theatre in Pitt Street, the club relocated to larger premises in the neighbouring Civil Services Stores in 1930 before its final move to the Mutual Life Assurance Building where it was located in the basement with the walls decorated with murals inspired by Charles Dicken's Pickwick Papers. To accommodate the club's needs, the architect Emil Sodersten redesigned the basement.

== Fund raising ==
The book club's colours were orange and black, and to celebrate its first anniversary in 1929, a ball was held in support of the Royal Institute for Deaf and Blind Children. At a subsequent ball the following year to aid the same institute, over £187 was raised.
