= Edens Lost (novel) =

1969 novel by Sumner Locke Elliott

- Author: Sumner Locke Elliott
- Language: English
- Publisher: Harper and Row, New York
- Publication date: 1969
- Media type: Print (hardback & paperback)
- Pages: 279 pp
- Preceded by: Some Doves and Pythons
- Followed by: The Man Who Got Away

Edens Lost (1969) is a novel by Australian writer Sumner Locke Elliott.

== Plot summary ==
The novel is a family saga told through the eyes of 16-year-old Angus Weekes who goes to live with the St James family in the Blue Mountains area of New South Wales after the death of his guardian.

== Critical reception ==
On its original publication Kirkus Review found: "All of this is, in its fashion, opulently romantic and pleasantly parlayed in silvery, sugary words (delightfuls and entrancings) without altogether forfeiting the realities of living and loving it sometimes seems to camouflage."

Dennis Altman nominated the book as his favourite novel in The Australian and noted that like "all of Elliott's writings based on his formative years, Edens Lost evokes pre-Menzies Australia through writing that is beautiful and precise. I suspect Elliott is one of the greatest stylists Australian writing has produced, even if a contemporary reader may lose patience at the careful accumulation of detail and minute observation that evokes for me the Sydney in which my parents met and married. I read Edens Lost when it was first published, in the early days of gay liberation, both knowing and not knowing that only a gay man could have written this book."

== See also ==
- 1969 in Australian literature

== Notes ==
- Dedication: For Marie
- Epigraph: "Where the apple reddens / Never pry - / Lest we lose our Edens, / Eve and I." / Browning, 'A Woman's Last Word'

== Television adaptation ==
The novel was adapted for a television mini-series, produced by Australian Broadcasting Corporation (ABC) and Central Independent Television. The adaptation was directed by Neil Armfield, from a script by Michael Gow, and featured Julia Blake, Arthur Dignam and Linda Cropper. It was broadcast in the United Kingdom on the ITV network over three episodes commencing on 16 December 1988 and in Australia on the ABC on 28 February 1989.
