= Your Obedient Servant (play) =

1943 play by Sumner Locke Elliott

- Original language: English
- Written by: Sumner Locke Elliott
- Genre: drama

Premiere
- Date: 4 December 1943
- Place: Independent Theatre, Sydney
- Directed by: Doris Fitton

Your Obedient Servant is a play by Sumner Locke Elliott. It was first performed at Sydney's Independent Theatre directed by Doris Fitton. The play was an allegory for the fascist occupation of Europe.

Coralie Campbell produced a further season of the play at Sydney's Genesian Theatre in 1969.

Elliott called "easily the worst of the five" initial plays he wrote for the Independent, "a meandering attempt to juxtapose an Australian (I had reached the locale at last) family against the climate of world totalitarianism, (the new wife was Nazi Germany, anyone could see that) and it failed on all counts and was dogged by bad luck from start to finish with changes in cast during rehearsals and the unbelievable fact that at the first reading it ran about an hour short and all kinds of unrelated events and scenes were written in to lengthen it.”

The Sydney Morning Herald felt "Despite its weak first act the play deserved its good reception" praising its "sound psychology, good sentiment, and dramatic urgency, though much of the incident is in familiar pattern."

== Premise ==
Clare, the second wife of a man, is offended by the happiness of his household. She bullies the French maid and her autocratic behaviour stifles any regard the children might have for her.
