= The Invisible Circus (play) =

Play by Sumner Locke Elliott

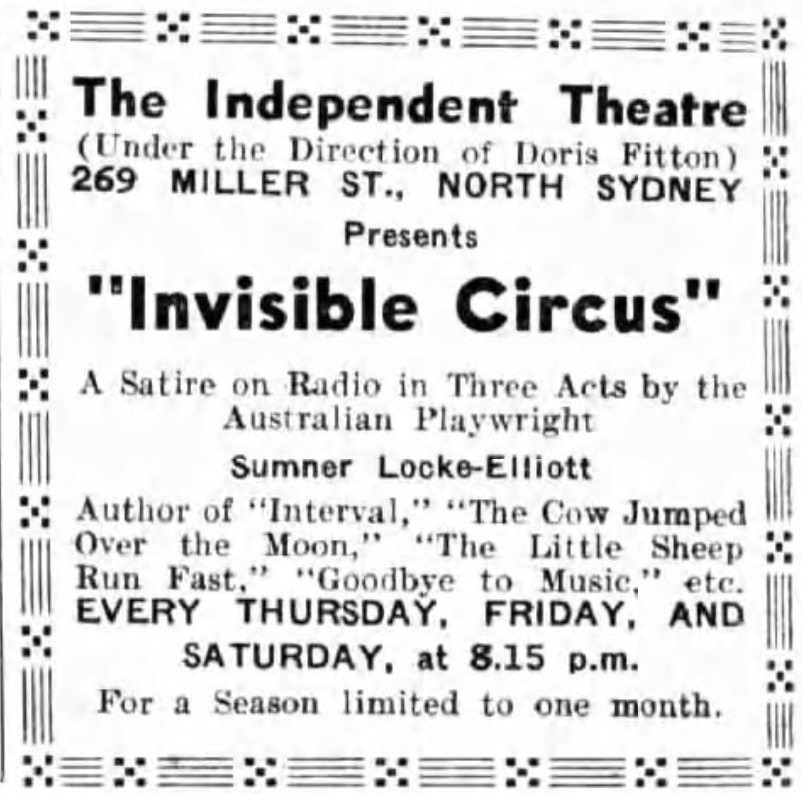
- Il Risveglio 5 Jun 1946
- Original language: English
- Written by: Sumner Locke Elliott
- Characters: Bradley McGee; Mona Natwick; Speed; Bette; Lottie Faircourte; Freda Chase; Iris Mitchell; Percy Kimlock; Mark Cornell; Courtney Skipton; Henry Melville; Bernard Freer; Mrs. Goll; J. B. Oliphant; Mr. Bullerton; Madam Napotelli; Sinclair Bullerton; JB Olliphant
- Subject: commercial radio
- Genre: comedy farce
- Setting: A commercial radio station

Premiere
- Date: May 1946
- Place: Independent Theatre, Sydney

The Invisible Circus is a 1946 Australian stage play by Sumner Locke Elliott set in the world of commercial radio drama, a field that Elliott knew well from many years writing for George Edwards. Elliott is represented in two characters, the idealistic Brad and the more jaded Mark.

== Premise ==
A young and idealistic scriptwriter, Brad McGee, is introduced to commercial radio. Among the characters he meets there are the receptionist, Mona; a gag writer, Percy; a grand actress, the Duchess; another actress, Fred.

The more jaded Mark Cornell winds up leaving radio.

== Production history ==
The original stage production by John Carlson ran for six weeks at the Independent Theatre, Sydney in 1946. There was a production in Melbourne later that year by the Little Theatre produced by Irene Mitchell starring Frank Thring. The play was also produced in Adelaide.

== Reception ==
The Sydney Morning Herald drama critic felt the play's "strength is dialogue, its weakness construction."

The Bulletin felt it was "quick-moving and entertaining" although "a fault was the American-style smart retorts, which have become such an ordeal to the average picture-goer. Hollywood’s newspaper or business comedies always have some disillusioned, hard-faced female (frequently with a heart of gold) ready and waiting to fire her synthesised comments on Man and the world. And so it was in The Invisible Circus; the same situations, the same openings, and click, like a well-oiled machine, the disillusioned damsel delivers the wisecracks in a tired, disillusioned voice."

The Argus called it "bright and pungent entertainment."

Leslie Rees thought the play "marked a great advance in originality" for Elliott's work, saying "Eschewing mawkish emotional situations, Locke-Elliott gave three acts of diverting farce-comedy." Rees added:

Invisible Circus had an opening not as sharp as it should have been; also it was reminiscent of the American Boy Meets Girl. As the play went on, it appeared to be as devoid of strong plot as had been Afford’s Mischief in the Air. But it was by the very means of not involving himself with complicated events that Sumner Locke-Elliott was able to release his gift for gay, extravagant, spontaneously gossipy but pointed dialogue. The second act was the best of it. The story conference, in which a new and idealistic script-writer’s opus was subjected to “office improvement", was extraordinarily funny. The rehearsal scene was good knockabout.

== Radio adaptation ==
The play was adapted for radio by George Farwell in a production that aired in December 1946. The cast included Peter Finch and Elliott himself.

The ABC produced the play for radio again in 1951 (directed by Doris Fitton) and 1956.

=== Cast of 1946 production ===
- Neva Carr Glyn as Iris Mitchell
- Sumner Locke Elliott as Bernard Free
- John Bushelle as Mark Cornell
- Lyndall Barbour as Courtney Skipton
- Max Osbiston as Bradley McGhee
- Rita Pauncefort as Lottie Faircourte
- Ann Bullen as Freda Chase
- Richard Matthews as Henry Melville
- Peter Finch as Sinclair Bullerton
- Pat MacDonald as Mona Natwick
- Queenie Ashton
- Rodney Jacobs as Percy
- Gwen Plumb as Auntie Etta
- Sidney Wheeler as JB Ollipant
- Bebe Scott as Mrs Goll

== Notes ==
- Pender, Anne (2016). "Theatre Animals: Sumner Locke Elliott's Invisible Circus". Australasian Drama Studies (68). La Trobe University: 54–74. hdl:1959.11/19464.
