= Patrick Quinn (actor) =

American actor (1950–2006)

- Born: Patrick Dominic Quinn; February 12, 1950; Philadelphia, Pennsylvania, U.S.
- Died: September 24, 2006 (aged 56); Bushkill, Pennsylvania, U.S.
- Occupation: Actor
- Years active: 1981–2003
- Partner: Martin Casella

13th President of the Actors' Equity Association
- In office 2000 – 2006 (died in office)
- Preceded by: Ron Silver
- Succeeded by: Mark Zimmerman

Patrick Dominic Quinn (February 12, 1950 – September 24, 2006) was an American actor. From 2000 until his death in 2006, he was the president of Actors' Equity Association.

== Early life ==
Quinn was born in Philadelphia, Pennsylvania, the son of a mortician. He had three brothers and one sister. Quinn studied theater at the Temple University and took his first role in a touring company of Man of La Mancha. He helped start the Charade Dinner Theater, the first Equity dinner theater in metropolitan Philadelphia.

== Career ==
His first Broadway role was in the 1976 revival of Fiddler on the Roof. He also appeared in the productions of Lend Me a Tenor, Beauty and the Beast, A Class Act and the 1998 revival of The Sound of Music.

Quinn's television credits included roles on the shows Bosom Buddies, Edens Lost and Remember WENN, as well as all three current versions of the NBC crime drama Law & Order. Quinn's voice was also featured as the main character in a Schoolhouse Rock! song, "Tax Man Max".

Quinn, who had been a member of Equity since 1970, was elected to the council in 1977. He was elected president in 2000. In 1987, he helped organize the non-profit organization Equity Fights AIDS, which later merged with Broadway Cares. At the time of his death, he was scheduled to succeed Alan Eisenberg as executive director of the association.

== Death ==
Quinn died of a heart attack at his country home in Bushkill, Pennsylvania, aged 56. He was survived by his partner of twelve years, Martin Casella.

== Filmography ==
=== Film ===
Year	Title	Role	Notes
1995	Pocahontas	Chorus	Voice role
1997	Anastasia	Ensemble and Character Vocals	Voice role

=== Television ===
Year	Title	Role	Notes
1981	Bosom Buddies	Marty Bursky	Episode: "What Price Glory?"
1988	Edens Lost	Corey	Miniseries, 3 episodes
1995	Schoolhouse Rock!	Tax Man Max	Voice role Episode: "Tax Man Max"
1997	Remember WENN	Gavin Landru	Episode: "And How!"
2001	Law & Order: Special Victims Unit	Milo Walther	Episode: "Ridicule"
2002	Law & Order	Dr. Grimes	Episode: "Girl Most Likely"
2003	Law & Order: Criminal Intent	Croydon's Attorney	Episode: "A Person of Interest"
