= Jezebel's Daughter =

1941 radio serial by Sumner Locke Elliott

Jezebel's Daughter is a 1941 Australian radio serial by Sumner Locke Elliott for the George Edwards Players. The serial was one of the most successful from Edwards.

The series was produced again in 1946, 1951, and 1954. The Brisbane Mail said it was "so unconsciously funny we rush through the washing-up every morning to be there in time to have a good laugh at it... Locke Elliott must be kidding somebody."

== Premise ==
"A woman fights all that stands in her way, only to find in middle-age that the very thing she has most wanted, the love of her daughter, is denied her. What she does to obtain a terrible revenge is told."
