= Goodbye to the Music =

Play by Sumner Locke Elliott

- Original language: English
- Written by: Sumner Locke Elliott
- Subject: music
- Genre: romantic comedy

Premiere
- Date: 11 September 1942
- Place: Independent Theatre, Sydney

Goodbye to the Music is a 1942 Australian stage play by Sumner Locke Elliott.

Elliott said it was written "during the time I was severely under the influence of Emlyn Williams." Elliott himself appeared in the initial production.

The Sydney Morning Herald said "the comedy is a considerable advance on Mr. Locke-Elliott's Three previous plays produced by Doris Fitton. The solution is neat, even if the last scene itself could be stronger. The plot conforms to a somewhat conventional pattern, but if the characters are "stock," the skilful dialogue gives them an appealing freshness."

The Daily Mirror said "Skilful dialogue is perhaps the plav's outstanding feature."

When the play was presented in Melbourne in 1948 a reviewer called it "a sentimentalised version of Margaret Kennedy’s The Constant Nymph."

== Premise ==
A pianist has forsaken his music because of a sudden brainstorm on the public platform, and because he has been deserted by his wife. He suddenly regains his desire to play, when another woman takes an interest in his music.
