= Rusty Bugles =

Australian play written by Sumner Locke Elliott in 1948

- Written by: Sumner Locke Elliott
- Original language: English
- Setting: Northern Territory during World War II

Premiere
- Date premiered: 1948

Rusty Bugles was a controversial Australian play written by Sumner Locke Elliott in 1948. It toured extensively throughout Australia between 1948–1949 and was threatened with closure by the New South Wales Chief Secretary's Office for obscenity.

== Production history ==
Premiered on 14 October 1948, it was produced by Doris Fitton and Sydney's Independent Theatre company, and was advertised as an "army comedy documentary". The announcement of its banning was made on 22 October by J. M. (Jack) Baddeley, the Chief Secretary and acting Premier of New South Wales. After initially defying the ban, Ftton avoided a forced closure by commissioning a rewrite from the author.

After an unprecedented 20-week run in Sydney, the Independent Theatre took the play to Melbourne, where it became the first production at The King's Theatre when it reopened. Meanwhile, another company was presenting Rusty Bugles at Killara, New South Wales, meaning that it was the first Australian play to run simultaneously in two states. The words that were the subject of the ban gradually reappeared and no legal action was ever taken. However, rewrites were demanded in different states.

At the end of its record six-month run in Melbourne, the production transferred to Adelaide and then returned to Sydney at the Tatler Theatre. By then, one critic felt that it was being played for laughs, with the swearing self-consciously emphasised, rather than being treated as a normal part of army patois.

The publisher of the play, Currency Press, quotes Elliott as saying that Rusty Bugles was "a documentary... Not strictly a play... it has no plot in the accepted sense". Elliott did not foresee that shortly after that, the genre of the theatre of the absurd would be established as a legitimate dramatic form, in which plot and the delineation of character are less important than the insight offered into the implicit drama of most human interactions.

== Cast (1948) ==
- Des Nolan ("Gig") – John Kingsmill
- Vic Richards – Ivor Bromley-Smith
- Sergeant Brooks – Sidney Chambers
- Rod Carsen – Ronald Frazer
- Andy Edwards ("The Little Corporal") – Robert Crome
- Otford ("Ot") – Alistair Roberts
- Mac – Frank O'Donnell
- Ollie – John Unicomb
- Chris – Kevin Healy
- "Darky" McClure – Lloyd Berrell
- "Keghead" Stephens – Ralph Peterson
- Corporal – doubled
- Ken Falcon ("Dean Maitland") – Michael Barnes
- First Private – Jack Wilkinson
- Second Private – James Lyons
- Bill Hendry (YMCA Sergeant) – Frank Curtain
- Private – Peter Hartland
- Jack Turner (Sigs Corporal) – doubled
- Sigs Private – doubled
- Sammy Kuhn – Kenneth Colbert

== Adaptations ==
The play was adapted for TV by the ABC in 1965 and then later in 1981. Both versions were directed by Alan Burke who had directed the stage play in 1949.

The play was also adapted by the ABC for radio in 1965.

== See also ==
- List of television plays broadcast on Australian Broadcasting Corporation (1960s)
