= The Cow Jumped Over the Moon =

Play by Sumner Locke Elliott

- Original language: English
- Written by: Sumner Locke Elliott
- Genre: comedy

Premiere
- Date: 30 October 1937
- Place: Independent Theatre, Sydney

The Cow Jumped Over the Moon is a 1937 Australian stage play by Sumner Locke Elliott. It was the first stage play by Elliott who was only twenty years old when it debuted.

Elliott's biographer said the play influenced almost every novel he wrote.

== Reception ==
Reviewing the original production at the Independent Theatre the Sydney Morning Herald said "Dialogue is brisk, convincing, and studded with certain laughs; characterisation is excellent; and the plot is well conceived and skilfully developed. It lacks the self-conscious amateur touch of most Australian plays, and must be rated among the best local efforts of the year." Another critic wrote "Apart from the bright story and snappy lines, this comedy is so well written that every character gets into the spotlight." The Bulletin said "The play drew a crowded audience, and, what is more, kept its laughter and interest right till the final curtain."

The play was performed for a season in Los Angeles at the Call Board Theatre in 1938. The play had been suggested by William Rees, formerly of Sydney who then lived in Los Angeles.

The play was seen by scouts from MGM who at one stage reportedly considered it for a vehicle for Billie Burke but decided against it on the grounds it was too similar to The Vinegar Tree.

Elliott later recalled the play "took about three days to complete, which is easily understandable if you take into consideration it is merely The Vinegar Tree with artificial colouring. . . . On the opening night a fuse blew out in the second act requiring most of the act to be played with the house lights on and seemed to me at the time a major catastrophe. I think I gave a rather conceited opening night speech and | received an anonymous letter about my profanity."

== Premise ==
A widowed middle aged woman meets an ex boyfriend.
