= Girl of the Ballet =

1942 Australian radio serial by Sumner Locke Elliott

Girl of the Ballet is a 1942 Australian radio serial by Sumner Locke Elliott for the George Edwards Company. It was the story of "an insignificant milliner who became the rage of Europe and America. Scandal nearly wrecked her career, she had a tragic marriage, and ended her days clinging desperately to the tarnished trappings of her vanished glory.

The series was popular and was repeated in 1943, 1946 and 1949.

== Cast ==
- Nell Stirling
- George Edwards as Anton Orsov and Nikko Surevski.
- Maxwell Osbiston
- Marion Johns
- Eric Scott
- Ailsa Grahame
- Lorna Bingham
- Beulah Mayhew

== Lily Parker ==
Elliott later wrote a 1947 serial about ballet for Edwards called Lily Parker.

It was about "a dancing team, Lily Parker and Eddie du Core, and the tragedy that caught up with Lily Parker, a ballet dancing couple".
