= Grand City =

1942 radio serial by Sumner Locke Elliott

Grand City is a 1942 Australian radio serial by Sumner Locke Elliott for the George Edwards Players. Episodes went for 15 minutes.

Edwards later bought a race horse called Grand City.

== Premise ==
"It tells of life in a great city; life which develops into a whirlwind of drama and romance, with a full measure of comedy."
