= University House, Newcastle, New South Wales =

University House
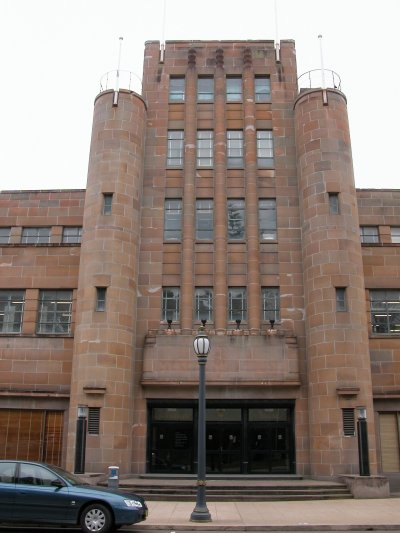

- Location within New South Wales Location within Australia
- 32.9279°S 151.7713°E
- Location: 300 King Street, Newcastle, City of Newcastle, New South Wales, Australia

History
- Built: 1937–1939

Site notes
- Architect(s): Emil Sodersteen in association with Pitt and Mereweather
- Owner: University of Newcastle

New South Wales Heritage Register
- Official name: Nesca House; University House
- Type: State heritage (built)
- Designated: 2 April 1999
- Reference no.: 217
- Type: Industrial office/admin building
- Category: Manufacturing and processing
- Builders: Ratcliffe & Kirsopp

University House is a heritage-listed building in Newcastle in New South Wales, Australia. Located on the corner of King Street and Auckland Street, it was designed by architect Emil Sodersten in association with local architectural practice Pitt and Merewether. An example of Art Deco style, the design was inspired by the streamlined functionalism of contemporary architecture in Europe.

The building was constructed between 1937 and 1939 for the Newcastle Electricity Supply Council Administration and was originally known as N.E.S.C.A House. The interior, designed by Guy Allbut, originally comprised a demonstration theatre, showroom, offices and staff accommodation. In 1959, when Shortland County Council became responsible for electricity supply in the Hunter Region, they constructed a three-storey extension at the back of the building. A tower was added in 1967 and remodelling was carried out in 1969 and 1970. After the council vacated the building in 1987, a radio station and an architectural practice moved in. The building only sustained cosmetic damage during the 1989 Newcastle earthquake. In 1995, the University of Newcastle established a library there. It was added to the New South Wales State Heritage Register on 2 April 1999.

== History ==
In 1890, Newcastle City Council began to generate electricity for street lighting, moving in 1892 to establish a district supply, providing electricity to other neighbouring councils and to private consumers. With the opening of BHP Steelworks in 1915, industrial development stimulated population growth in the area resulting in an increasing demand for power. By 1937, the Council's Electricity Department "was providing over 87 million kilowatt hours of power and attracting annual revenue of £450,000".

Outgrowing its office space in Newcastle City Hall, council decided, in 1937, to construct a separate administrative centre for the Electricity Department, to be situated adjacent to the Town Hall. Selected by the delegates, Mayor, Alderman H. Fenton and Electrical Engineer, Guy Allbut, Emil Sodersteen (whose name was changed to Sodersten by deed poll in 1941), who in 1927 achieved national prominence by winning the design competition for the Australian War Memorial in Canberra, was chosen as the architect to design the new building. His associates on the project were to be local architects, Pitt and Merewether.

The new building was to be designed to complement the Town Hall (designed by theatre architect, H.E White) which was constructed in 1929. However, the building had to have a modern design, as electricity was still relatively novel in the 1930s and the building needed to embody the concept of progress through electricity. Thus, it would have been unthinkable for the Council's electricity administration centre to have been more traditional in design. The new building would "be modern, efficient, timesaving and functional", pulling together the city's many electrical departments into one building. The building was to house a demonstration theatre, showroom, administrative and business offices and staff accommodation.

N.E.S.C.A House marks a new era in the architecture of Sodersteen, his disillusionment with the skyscraper leading him to draw on English perspectives and European functional modernism for his future designs.

The interior decoration and layout of N.E.S.C.A House had much to do with Guy Allbut, who had toured American electrical facilities. Allbut was very taken with American perspectives and was a defining influence on the interior of the building.

Construction began in 1937 and, after significant delays due to water on the site and difficulty in obtaining the correct steel sections, the building was opened on 8 September 1938 by Hon. E.S. Spooner, former Minister for Works and Local Government.

In 1959, the Shortland County Council assumed control of power supplies for the Hunter Region. In their new role they oversaw the construction of a three-story addition to the rear of N.E.S.C.A House. During their tenure they also added a decorative tower in 1967 and in 1969 the theatre and demonstration centre were remodelled. Further remodelling occurred in 1970 when two floors were added to the 1959 addition and the original council chamber was revitalised for new purposes.

In 1979, in a move deplored by the National Trust, the curved windows were removed from the front of the building. The sandstone facing was also cleaned and re-caulked with silicone.

The Shortland County Council occupied the building until 1987, when the Council moved operations to Wallsend. In 1989, the building was used by Newcastle FM radio and by Suters Architects Snell, using the ground floor in 1990.

In 1995, the University of Newcastle established a library in the building. N.E.S.C.A House also houses collections of the Conservatorium: School of Music and Drama. More recently the building has also become the Graduate School of Business and the Newcastle Legal Centre. Currently known as "University House", the building now accommodates the University of Newcastle Legal Centre, the Newcastle Business School and the Watt Space Gallery.

The exterior of the building appeared in the 2006 film Superman Returns as "Newhart Federal Bank", the scene of a bank robbery.

== Description ==
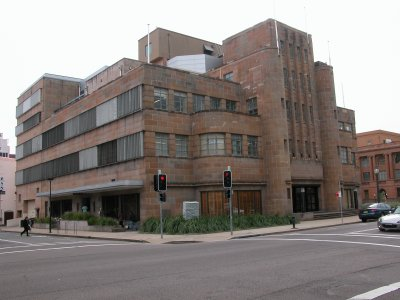
Side view

N.E.S.C.A House was designed, by Emil Sodersten, on contemporary English lines in keeping with the work of Wells Coates and George Coles. Described as having a "heavy, streamlined form", the "new style was the streamlined functionalism of leading European architects". Structural drawings show the main buildings framework to be of concrete encased structural steel with mild steel reinforcing rods used throughout the structure. Concrete floors and some secondary floor beams appear to have been cast in-situ and were specified to use normal Portland cement, sand and coarse aggregate.

It was reported to be in good condition as at 20 May 2009, although some of the significant fabric is in need of repair or maintenance. Some of the original fabric has also been removed or relocated.

== Heritage listing ==
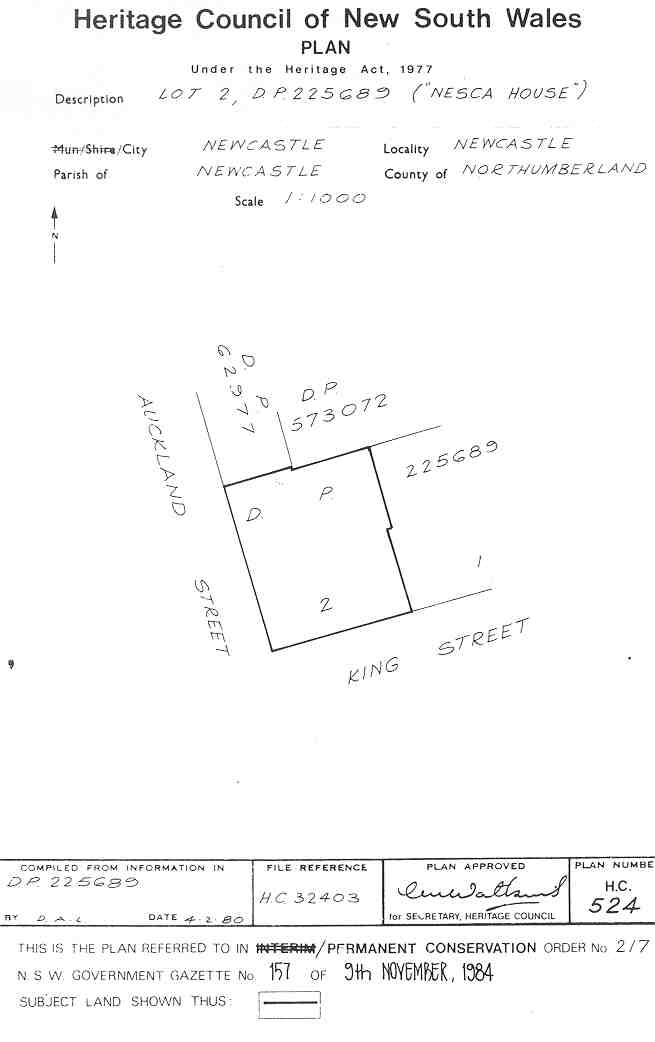
Heritage boundaries

NESCA House is of state significance as an outstanding Art Deco building by the architect Emil Sodersten. The House is evidence of Newcastle's shift from a coal port to a heavy industry city. It is also intimately linked to perceptions of electricity in the 1930s as a novel energy source that was the way of the future. The Art Deco style, rather than a more traditional building, is a reflection of these perceptions.

Nesca House was listed on the New South Wales State Heritage Register on 2 April 1999 having satisfied the following criteria.

The place is important in demonstrating the course, or pattern, of cultural or natural history in New South Wales.

NESCA House is of State significance as evidence of the development of Newcastle from a coal port into a heavy industry city and the subsequent increase in importance to the State's economy.

The House is of State significance as evidence of the historical integration of electricity into society and the notion of "progress through electricity".

The House is of State significance as evidence of the practice of local government activities and the shift through local and regional to state electricity supply.

The place has a strong or special association with a person, or group of persons, of importance of cultural or natural history of New South Wales's history.

NESCA House is of State significance as the work of Emil Sodersten, an eminent architect of the 20th century.

The place is important in demonstrating aesthetic characteristics and/or a high degree of creative or technical achievement in New South Wales.

NESCA House is of State significance as an outstanding example of Art Deco style with tendency towards Functional Modernism. It expresses the change from traditional design towards the concepts of modern efficiency, timesaving and functional designs.
