= The Little Sheep Run Fast =

Play by Sumner Locke Elliott

- Original language: English
- Written by: Sumner Locke Elliott
- Genre: melodrama

Premiere
- Date: 18 May 1940
- Place: Independent Theatre, Sydney
- Directed by: Richard Parry

The Little Sheep Run Fast is a 1940 Australian play by Sumner Locke Elliott. Being a drama, it was a change of genre from his first two stage plays, which were both comedies.

Elliott later said that the play "was my first attempt to write significant drama and contained, as I remember, a profusion of disgracefully baroque metaphor and the fact that it was a disaster was plainly evident in the waxen smiles of those few friends who came back after the first night. To this day I cannot remember what the title had to do with the play and I suspect nothing."

The Sydney Morning Herald called it one of the best plays staged by the Independent Theatre: "Tense dramatic moments clever dialogue and comedy incidents kept the interest of the large audience throughout... It has an Australian setting, but it not in any way typically Australian."

The Daily Telegraph thought "Locke-Elliott confirms his early promise in this somewhat more mature work. He has exchanged "smart" comedy for drama, and the change, considered generally, is a big improvement. Unquestionably he Is one of Australia's most competent playwrights."

The Bulletin called it "a good piece of work" but felt the author "would do better to make comedy his best girl."

The Wireless Weekly said "although it was a good effort I found it by no means exceptional. The first act is well written. Scene two of act two dragged badly and act three was dreary. Chief fault was the wordy dialogue... Other faults were the too frequent references to art, politics, and literature, some of which seemed to be made just to show the author’s extensive knowledge."

Elliott later reflected, "I liked The Little Sheep, but it was a very bad play. I'd become involved in symbolism. The play was about everything. But it was my first play with an Australian setting. I was growing up and becoming conscious of my own country."

== Premise ==
A girl, Kare, has only just been married when she goes to a farm for a holiday. She meets and falls in love with Rudd Barton, whose mother Amy runs the farm. Amy is jealous of her son's attraction for anyone other than herself. Horrified that Rudd may run off with a married woman, Amy takes extreme action.
