= Careful, He Might Hear You (novel) =

1963 novel by Sumner Locke Elliott

- First US edition
- Author: Sumner Locke Elliott
- Language: English
- Publisher: Harper and Row, USA
- Publication date: 1963
- Publication place: Australia
- Media type: Print (hardback & paperback)
- Followed by: Some Doves and Pythons

Careful, He Might Hear You is a Miles Franklin Award-winning novel by Australian author Sumner Locke Elliott. It was published in 1963 and was the author's first novel.

== Synopsis ==
Careful, He Might Hear You is based on the author's childhood. The secure world of an orphan living with his working-class aunt and uncle is changed forever with the arrival of another aunt from London who wishes to raise him as her child.

== Critical reception ==
Kim Forrester on the Reading Matters weblog, writing about the Text Publishing edition, called the book "a big, beautiful, bold-hearted book set in Sydney during the Great Depression. It’s most definitely a five-star read." And she continued: "As a portrait of a big, complicated family of women — their tensions, petty squabbles, foibles, flaws and strengths — it is superb. The individual characters of all PS’s aunts — the posh one, the sensible one, the fun one, the religious one — are beautifully drawn and wonderfully contrasted with his own dead mother, the woman with an angelic reputation who had a devilish streak few people knew about...The dialogue is witty, peppered with the vernacular of the time, and Sydney, in the heat, is captured so vividly it feels as if it’s a character in its own right. The 1930s setting is also particularly evocative."

== Awards ==
The novel won the 1963 Miles Franklin Award.

== Publication history ==
After the initial publication of the novel in the US by Harper and Row in 1963, the novel was published as follows:

- Gollancz, UK, 1963
- Fawcett, USA, 1965
- Pan, UK, 1966, 1983, 1984
- Picador, Australia, 1997
- Text Publishing, Australia, 2012

== Adaptions ==
The novel was adapted for a film of the same name in 1983. The film was directed by Carl Schultz, from a screenplay by Michael Jenkins, and featured Wendy Hughes, Robyn Nevin and Nicholas Gledhill.

A musical production was performed in Canberra, Australia in 1999 by Supa Productions. The stage production was developed by David Sale (Book and Lyrics) and Ron Creager (music) and starred Toni Lamond (as Lila Baines), Jayden Cooke and Jordan Prosser (as PS) and Bronwyn Sullivan (as Vanessa Scott).

== See also ==
- 1963 in Australian literature
- Middlemiss.org
