= C. Hansby Read =

Australian diarist and playwright

Clarence Hansby Read (7 October 1879 – 1959) was an Australian diarist, playwright and theatre personality.

== History ==
Read was born in Sydney, the second son of George Read, and Alice Read, née Pearson. He spent his early years in the Blue Mountains, attending Glenbrook Primary School.

=== Navy ===
He was promoted to Sub-lieutenant in 1902 and lieutenant in 1912. He was in charge of the Naval Guard in Madang, on the north coast of New Guinea, 1914–1915 and maintained contact with the mission stations and plantations to ensure their neutrality. His diary, held by the National Library of Australia, is an important historical document. He was promoted to Lieutenant-Commander RANR (Royal Australian Naval Reserves) in 1939.

=== Playwright ===
Read founded the Talatah Players, with a studio at 29 Jamieson Street, Sydney, and was director of the Theatre Institute He wrote numerous plays, producing several, with varying degrees of success.

- Hoboes All (1934) one of four winners in a contest run by Independent Theatre. It was staged by the Talatah Players in 1937.
- The Fatal Year (1934) another winner in the same competition
- Scrubby Reforms (1934) premiered at the NSW Conservatorium of Music as part of the Anzac Eve Festival.
- Gates of Remembrance (1937), staged by the Talatah Players, perhaps their first production.
- Rustless Gold (1937), premiered at the Australian National Theatre.
- Remains to be Proved (1937) won a competition run by Independent Theatre.
- Boyd of Boyd Town (1938) historical drama, about failed entrepreneur Benjamin Boyd.
- Impasse (1939) and Winners, both staged at the Little Theatre. Production and acting in Impasse were heavily criticised.
- The Queen of Sheba (1940 revue)
- Dolly Comes Home (1940)
- World Without End (1948) production criticised
- Dawn Service (1951) won Anzac Festival Committee competition

=== Other interests ===
In 1927 he founded C. Hansby Read Ltd as agents, importers and exporters. In June 1930 shareholders in the company passed a resolution for voluntary liquidation of the company, Read being appointed liquidator.

== Family ==
On 10 April 1907 Clarence Hansby Read married Mabel Louisa Coates. Their children include:

- Mervyn Hansby Read (1 February 1908 – 9 May 1980)
- Clarence Hylton Hansby Read (3 August 1913 – )
- Marjorie Alice Read (12 October 1916 – )

They had a home, "Kenilworth", Pine Street, Randwick.
