= City Mutual Life Assurance Building =

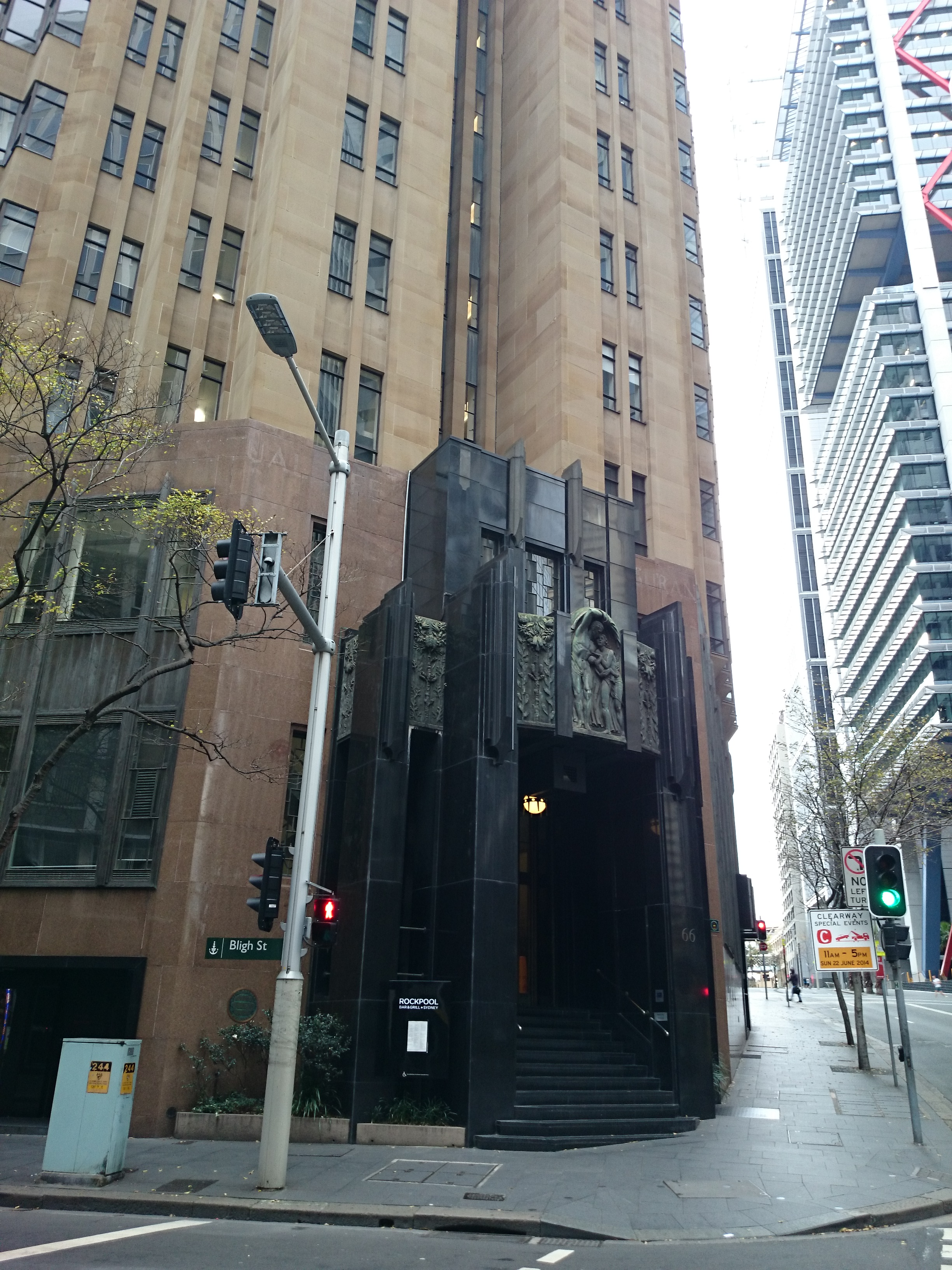
- CML building, pictured in 2014

- Location within Sydney Location within Australia
- 33.8660°S 151.2103°E
- Location: 60-66 Hunter Street, Sydney central business district, City of Sydney, New South Wales, Australia

History
- Built: 1936; 1946–47; 1956

Site notes
- Architects: Emil Sodersteen with John Crust (1936); H. Ruskin Rowe (1946–47); C. C. Ruwald and Howard (1956)
- Architectural style: Art Deco

New South Wales Heritage Register
- Official name: City Mutual Life Assurance Building; CML Building; 10 Bligh Street
- Type: State heritage (built)
- Designated: 2 April 1999
- Reference no.: 585
- Type: Commercial Office/Building
- Category: Commercial

The City Mutual Life Assurance Building is a heritage-listed commercial building located at 60-66 Hunter Street, in the Sydney central business district, New South Wales, Australia. It was built during 1936. It is also known as CML Building and 10 Bligh Street. It was added to the New South Wales State Heritage Register on 2 April 1999.

== History ==
The Head Office of the City Mutual Life Assurance Society Limited has been associated with the eastern corner of Hunter and Bligh Streets since 1891. On 16 February 1891, part of the present corner site was purchased by the Society for £22,000. The site had approximately equal frontage to both street. At the time of acquisition the site was occupied by a plumber's shop at the corner of the two streets, along with several other buildings dating to the middle of the nineteenth century.

Five leading Sydney architects were invited to submit designs for the Society's new head office building. G. A. Mansfield's design for a four-storey Victorian Second Empire style building with mansard roof was chosen. The main entrance was at the corner of Hunter and Bligh Streets with retain areas contained on ground level facing Hunter Street. This building occupied the site until 1934 when the Society decided to expand and modernise its accommodation. Prior to this decision the building adjacent to the site (in Bligh Street) had been purchased.

Once again, City Mutual sought to obtain ideas from a number of architects and offered a prize for the best design of the new office block. Eleven designs were submitted and the prize was duly awarded. The Board of Directors, however, preferred Emil Sodersteen's design. This had been withdrawn by the architect prior to the final decision. Sodersteen was approached and was subsequently appointed as architect. Sodersteen had commenced private practice in 1925 and had established a name for himself after winning a design competition for the Australian War Memorial in Canberra in 1927. He and another architect, John Crust, collaborated on its final design which was completed in 1928.

Sodersteen's design for the new City Mutual Building was styled after the American skyscrapers of that period. He "regarded the skyscraper as the acme of efficiency and perfection. Its expressive form, facade zoning, integral decoration and rationalised embellishments inspired his distinctive and (in Sydney in the thirties) unique Art Deco". At that time in Sydney the building was a striking new structure - arresting in effect. A periodical of the day enthusiastically described the structure's impact upon passers by:

"It is not an exaggeration to say that the whole of Sydney is talking about the new City Mutual Building. Every building has its group of admirers and commentators, particularly when the dogman is nonchalantly performing his daily round; but the City Mutual has caused more than casual interest. People passing in the trams lean forward to gaze upon it, while those walking up Hunter Street stop to admire its streamline symmetry."

— Building magazine, 1936.

The City Mutual Building has generally been regarded as the culmination of Sodersteen's Art Deco work. It combined the architect's sophisticated personal vision with his interpretation of the skyscraper to produce one of the finest of Sydney's modern office buildings. Exterior elevations with their powerful verticality and articulation announced a major commercial building that maximised the site's height and site coverage potential. The building expressed the spirit of the age by the use of latest technology (at that time) and materials: glossy polished surfaces, precise metal detailing and rich colour contrasts. Sodersteen's design for the new City Mutual Building incorporated a steel framed structure clad externally in polished granite and sandstone. It extended for two basement levels, ground level and ten upper floors with some accommodation at roof level. Air conditioning was incorporated into the design the building was one of the first in Sydney to provide this amenity. Externally the building emphasises the corner of Bligh and Hunter Streets, through the verticality of the tower element. Polished black granite at the base of the main entrance is strongly modelled with few embellishments. Internally the design centres upon the three storey Assurance chamber which is entered at a 45 degree angle from the main entrance. Because of the building's height and the natural elevation of the site, the structure was originally clearly visible from ferries entering Circular Quay.

The City Mutual Building was officially opened on 1 October 1936. Due to the building's success, Sodersteen became the designated architect for the Society's work and undertook a number of other jobs including the QBE Building in Pitt Street, Sydney and Lennon's Hotel, Brisbane.

During the last fifty years a number of alterations and additions have occurred to the building. Most of the changes have not significantly affected the integrity of the original design. Sodersteen himself was responsible for the initial alterations. The first occurred to the sub-basement level. Here, Sodersteen designed a restaurant that was leased to the Pickwick Club. This became well known throughout Sydney for its luncheons, receptions (especially weddings) and its library. A second alteration occurred on the eleventh level where minor changes were made to the staff amenities area. This level also contained the caretaker's flat and a garden. The weight of the soil and the watering of the garden posed problems and the garden was soon removed. In 1956 C. C. Ruwald and Howard, Architects, designed extensions to the eleventh level that virtually formed another floor. At street level, however, this addition is not prominent and does not interrupt the integrity of the design.

In 1946 the Society approached Sodersteen to design a mezzanine level within the three storey Assurance chamber. Preliminary research indicates that Sodersteen was most displeased with the idea and refused to design the mezzanine. Also around this time Sodersteen instigated a lawsuit against the Society regarding the payment of fees for a Pitt Street building design project which had been cancelled. Although Sodersteen eventually won the case, the ill feelings generated by the affair meant that he ceased to be the architect for the Society.

H. Ruskin Rowe became architect for the Society and designed the mezzanine level which was constructed in 1946/7. Rowe was formally from the firm of Ross and Rowe, a prominent architectural firm in Sydney, and one of the firms in which Sodersteen received his early architectural training. It seems clear that Sodersteen would have objected to the mezzanine addition for a number of reasons. Aesthetically, it interrupts the integrity of the chamber space and the clarity of the design intent. Professionally, it would seem unfair that a former mentor would alter Sodersteen's design with the knowledge of his displeasure.

Various other changes have occurred over the years, mainly in the office levels. During the 1960s the original floor and wall linings were either been replaced or covered with new materials.

Originally the City Mutual Society occupied only the ground, first and second floor levels and leased the remaining space in the building, but later occupied most of the building including the car park and former Pickwick Club, which were used for the benefit of staff. City Mutual occupied the building until the 1990s, at which time the building was converted to strata title and sold to various businesses.

== Description ==
The design has a strongly modelled facade to Hunter and Bligh Streets with tower element at corner. Central three storey business chamber entered at ground level. One of the best intact examples of Art Deco style applied to a commercial office building in Sydney CBD. The steel framed concrete encased structure is clad externally in polished red granite to first floor level. The entrances are finished in polished black granite with sculptured relief panels finished in copper (over plaster). The second floor level to eleventh floor level are finished in Hawkesbury sandstone. Internally, the walls were originally rendered and clad in scagliola or lined with timber veneer panels. The Foundation is excavated to good quality white sandstone base, the steel structure rests on reinforced concrete pad footings.

The windows, to ground and first floor levels, are bronze-framed, with fixed, clear glazing. To the upper levels, the windows are steel-framed casement sash, double glazed at second floor level; clear glazing. To the light well, the windows are steel-framed central pivoting awning sash with fixed glazed panels above and below sash window. Frosted wired glazing to windows. The roof comprises seam and batten copper sheeting, falling to eaves gutters at light well and box gutters to parapets along street facades.

The overall lack of significant deterioration in most of the materials and detailing to the facades to Hunter and Bligh Streets is indicative of good quality materials and workmanship. The facades in general have survived relatively intact and in good order. Minor changes externally include the addition of two "City Mutual" signs and the removal of certain minor fittings near the Bligh Street entrance. Alterations and additions to the eleventh floor level during the late 1940s and 1950s does not impose on the integrity of the facades when viewed from street level.

Internally, certain incremental changes have occurred over the last forty years. These include:

- Addition of mezzanine level to Assurance chamber in c. 1947.
- Various alterations to office partitioning including replacement of concealing of scagliola panels to certain lift lobby and corridor walls.
- Replacement or concealing of original rubber flooring to certain lift lobbies, corridors and the Assurance chamber.
- Refitting of original bronze panelled lift cars and doors with steel and aluminium ones in 1984.
- Addition of computer facilities and new, separate air conditioning plant to service same.

=== Exterior condition ===
No major cracking of the facades or internal walls has been observed and no other indications are apparent to suggest major foundation movement, structural damage or deterioration. The building generally appears to be in good condition. The sandstone facing of the walls appears to be in good condition in most cases. Some surface exfoliation in evident in areas of excessive exposure to rainfall (such as parapets, sills, projecting mouldings, etc.). Caulking between sandstone units appears to be deteriorating in many section. Polished granite facing the base of building is in good condition although some holes need to be filled in and sealed. Light court walls show signs of deterioration. Glazed surfaces are crazed and generally affected by atmospheric pollutants.

The bronze-framed windows to ground and first floor levels appear to be in good condition. All windows above first floor level are steel framed and most are in poor condition. Steel members are rusting, making movement of sashes difficult. Some glazed panels have cracked due to differential movements within steel frames. Insect screens on louvre windows to toilets have rusted completely. Rusting of some light court window frames has caused cracking of surrounding concrete.

On the roof, the copper sheeting appears to be in good condition. No sighs of active water penetration observed on eleventh level. On roof of tower section signs of water penetration were evident on concrete surrounds to timber service access hatch.

=== Interior condition ===
Accompanying drawings show extent of original wall and floor lining still existing in building.

Most lift lobbies have retained original scagliola panels in good condition as well as floor numbers, lift indicators and terrazzo skirtings. Stairwells also are, in most cases, in original condition. Only on three levels do the corridors retain all of their original detailing. The other levels have had the wall and/or floor lining materials replaced or concealed. The original detailing - scagliola wall panels, timber joinery, highlight fixed glazed windows with expanded metal mesh ventilation slots, timber doors (some with original black outlined gold lettering) - where retained is in good condition and has been well maintained. On most of the ground floor level walls the scagliola has been retained but is cracking severely and is drummy in many places. Original timber veneer panelling to boardroom on second floor level, doctor's surgery on first floor level and some executive offices has been retained and is in good condition. Most office areas have been refurbished and little original detailing remains.

The ceilings are generally in good condition. Most appear to have been recently painted. Original form and detailing, however, appears to have been retained in lift lobbies and corridor spaces. Office areas have had suspended ceilings installed on many levels. In ground floor level lobbies the original marble floors are in good condition. Original floor to Assurance chamber may still be in place under carpet. Lift lobbies and corridors on first floor level and above originally had black and white rubber flooring. In many cases this still remains but has been well worn. Many areas have been carpeted and extent of original flooring is unknown at this stage.

The original air conditioning and ventilation equipment is still in place and servicing the building. Spare parts are, however, difficult to obtain and require special manufacturing. The cooling tower has been replaced and a new and separate air conditioning system has been installed for the computer facilities. Lift cars and doors, and presumably the lifting system, has been replaced. Many original light fittings remain as well as some fixtures such as power points and switches. In most cases, however, these have been replaced.

== Heritage listing ==
The City Mutual Life Assurance Building is one of the foremost examples of high quality and well-designed commercial Art Deco architecture in Sydney's CBD and represents the culmination of the work of one of Australia's foremost proponents of this style, Emil Sodersteen. As a largely intact and well maintained late 1930s structure, the building demonstrates through its powerful exterior elevations and dramatic interior spaces the aesthetic and commercial aspects of Art Deco architecture in Australia.

The building occupies a dominant position in the surrounding urban context, serving as a backdrop to Richard Johnson Square and as a landmark in the Bligh and Hunter Streetscapes. Since its completion in 1936, the building has been a symbol of the Mutual Life Assurance Society and the building stands as a monument to the Society's participation in the evolution of Sydney's business and commerce. Significance of the building's individual components is discussed below.

Exterior

Exterior elevations to Bligh and Hunter Streets represent intact and well-maintained examples of late Art Deco commercial detailing and massing. The materials used to differentiate parts of the building and its proportions demonstrate the Art Deco preoccupation with the precision of modern technology and materials. The tower at the corner of Bligh and Hunter Streets is the focal point of the building and serves as a major landmark to the Richard Johnson Square and the Bligh and Hunter Streetscapes. Materials and detailing at lower elevations are oriented to the scale and perceptions of pedestrians. Such detailing includes the glossy granite building base at street level, bronze window sashes and sculptures (by Rayner Hoff) over the main entrances.

Interior

The lift foyer to the main entrance at the Hunter/Bligh Street corner is an intact and handsomely detailed expression of late 1930s commercial interior design. Scagliola walls, brass handrails and bronze fixtures as well as original indirect lighting fixtures demonstrate the craftsmanship and integrity of the overall building design. Main lift foyers survive largely intact on all building levels.

The ground floor main business chamber is the largest and most intact Art Deco commercial chamber in Sydney. It demonstrates Emil Sodersteen's considerable design abilities in accommodating a formally proportioned interior space within an irregular external building envelope. The streamlined space is a controlled image of commercial prestige highlighted by sophisticated detailing and craftsmanship. Scagliola wall and column surfacing, bronze window frames and detailed plasterwork emphasise the overall ambiance of the space.

Other major interior spaces that reinforce the total building design include the secondary lift foyers on the ground, first and second floors, and the second floor Board Room.

The City Mutual Life Assurance Building was listed on the New South Wales State Heritage Register on 2 April 1999.

== See also ==
- Australian non-residential architectural styles
