= Harry Tighe =

Australian playwright and novelist

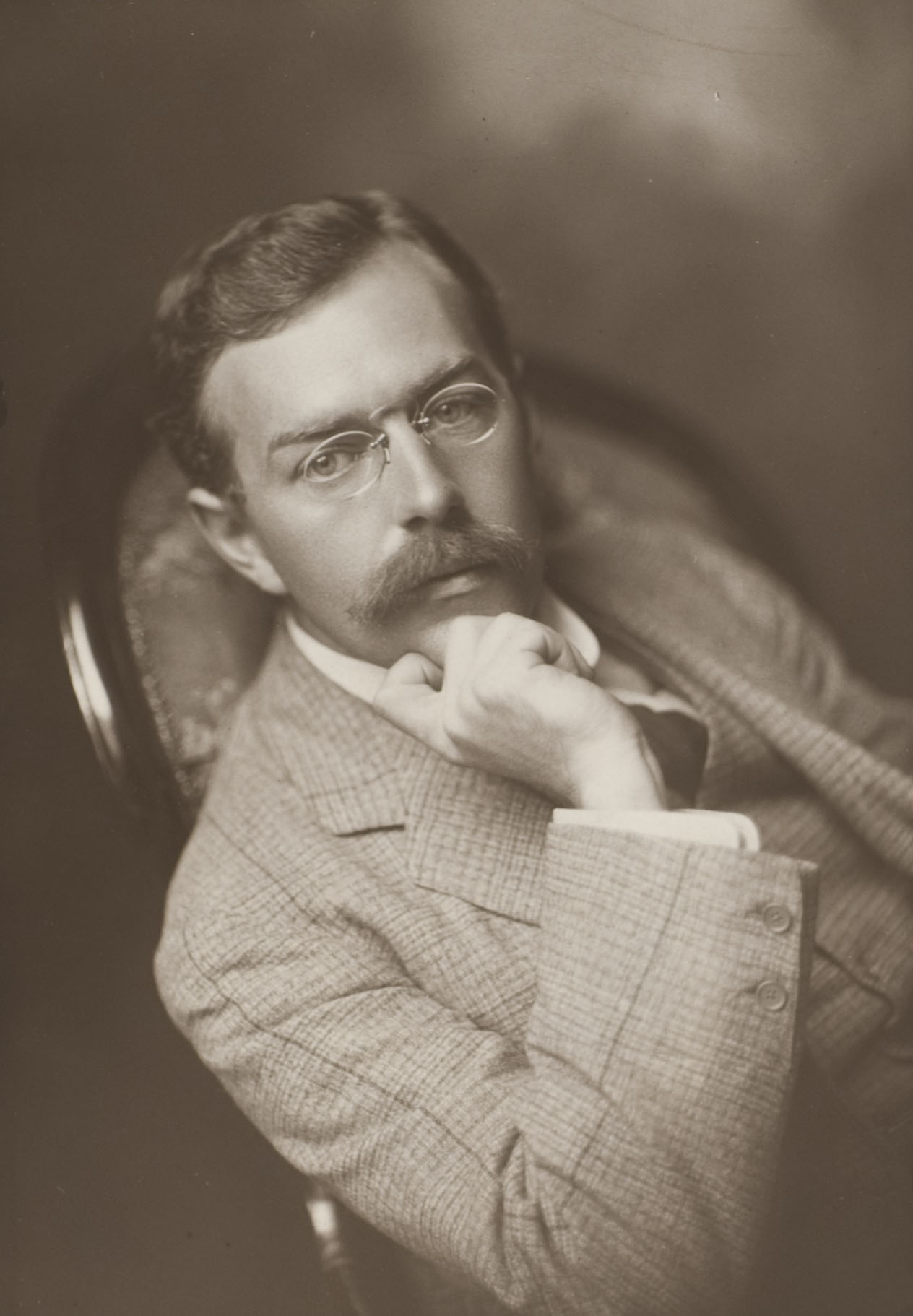
Portrait by L. W. Appleby, between 1906- 1920

Harry Tighe (1877–1946) was an Australian playwright and novelist. Born in Newcastle, New South Wales He was Cambridge educated and spent the most active part of his career in Britain. He spent three mature years living in Cremorne, Sydney during which he tried theatre production as a founder of the Independent Theatre His passage to Australia was booked when he died.

== Works ==
=== Plays ===
- 1910 Four Candles
- 1920 Intrigue
- 1927 Open Spaces
- 1930 The Canary Waistcoat
- 1931 The Bush-Fire
- 1933 The Insult (adapted for film)
- 1927 Old Mrs Wiley
- Drastic Measures
- Penang
- Red Foam (contributor)

=== Novels ===
- 1922 Women of the Hills
- Emily Reed
- With the Tide
- Sheep Path
- 1908 Galore Girl
- 1908 A Man of Sympathy
- 1902 Remorse
- 1939 By The Wayside
