= Wicked Is the Vine =

Play by Sumner Locke Elliott

Wicked is the Vine
- Original language: English
- Written by: Sumner Locke Elliott

Premiere
- Date: 1947
- Place: Lux Radio Theatre

Wicked is the Vine is a 1947 radio play by Sumner Locke Elliott that was later adapted for American television.

It was inspired by the Lizzie Borden murder.

== Plot ==
In 1918, two sisters, Sarah and Ellie Vinson, come into conflict. It results in murder..

== Radio play ==
Elliott wrote the play in Australia for Lux Radio Theatre. It was one of the few original plays they had commissioned. He wrote it while trying to emigrate to the US.

The original production aired in 1947 and starred Brenda Dunrich and Neva Carr Glyn.

One listener wrote in complaining saying the show was "well acted and well produced, we grant, but what a thing to inflict on people trying to escape for one brief hour from the real life tragedies of these troubled times. Open any newspaper any day and you can get your callous murders and your shootings and your wicked people without having to go to the radio plays for it. Wicked Is the Vine gave us two murders and one attempted murder, complete with the horrible sounds of blows on a human head, shots, screams, gaspings for breath, and groans... Truly wicked is the man who chose Wicked Is the Vine."

It received some bad reviews but was also awarded Best Play by the Federation of Commercial Radio Stations.

It was presented again in 1952.

== 1949 TV adaptation ==
It was adapted for US television making it the first Australian play to be screened on American television.

It aired on 30 March 1949 and was directed by Stanley Quin. It starred Ron Randell, an Australian-born actor.

The production was well received and launched Elliott's career in New York as a TV writer. It also led to Randell receiving a number of TV offers.

== Stage version ==
A stage version of the play premiered in London in 1953 at the New Torch Theatre Club starring Maureen Pryor. A review said "there is power in the drama... but the power would benefit by curbing; it is too uncouth."
