= Scarlet Rhapsody =

1947 radio serial by Sumner Locke Elliott

ABC Weekly 19 July 1947

Scarlet Rhapsody is a 1947 Australian radio serial by Sumner Locke Elliott for the George Edwards Players.

The serial was one of the most successful from Edwards.

It was produced again in 1949.

== Premise ==
"The story of a girl born to become a musical genius but whose life was shadowed by tragedy."

== Cast ==
- George Edwards
- Nell Stirling
- Joan Lord
- Ron Roberts
- Jean Robertson
- Hilda Scurr
- William Rees
- Deryck Barnes
- Queenie Ashton
- Moray Powell
