= Children in Uniform =

- Original title: Gestern und heute
- Original language: German
- Written by: Christa Winsloe

Premiere
- Date: 1930

Children in Uniform (Gestern und heute) is a 1930 German play written by Christa Winsloe.

The play was originally produced in Leipzig under the title Knight Nerestan then in Berlin under the title Gestern und heute (Yesterday and Today).

The play was adapted into the film Mädchen in Uniform (1931) and the novel Das Mädchen Manuela (The Child Manuela) (1933).

The play was produced in London in 1932 and Ireland in 1934.

== Australian radio adaptation ==
The play was adapted for Australian radio in 1942, 1946, 1953 and 1958.

ABC Weekly, reviewing the 1946 version, said "It is a long time since a Sunday night play has given us so much of the real stuff of humanity, in such superb dramatic form."

Catherine Duncan won Best Actress at the 1946 Macquarie Awards for her performance in Children in Uniform.
