= Christa Winsloe =

German sculptor

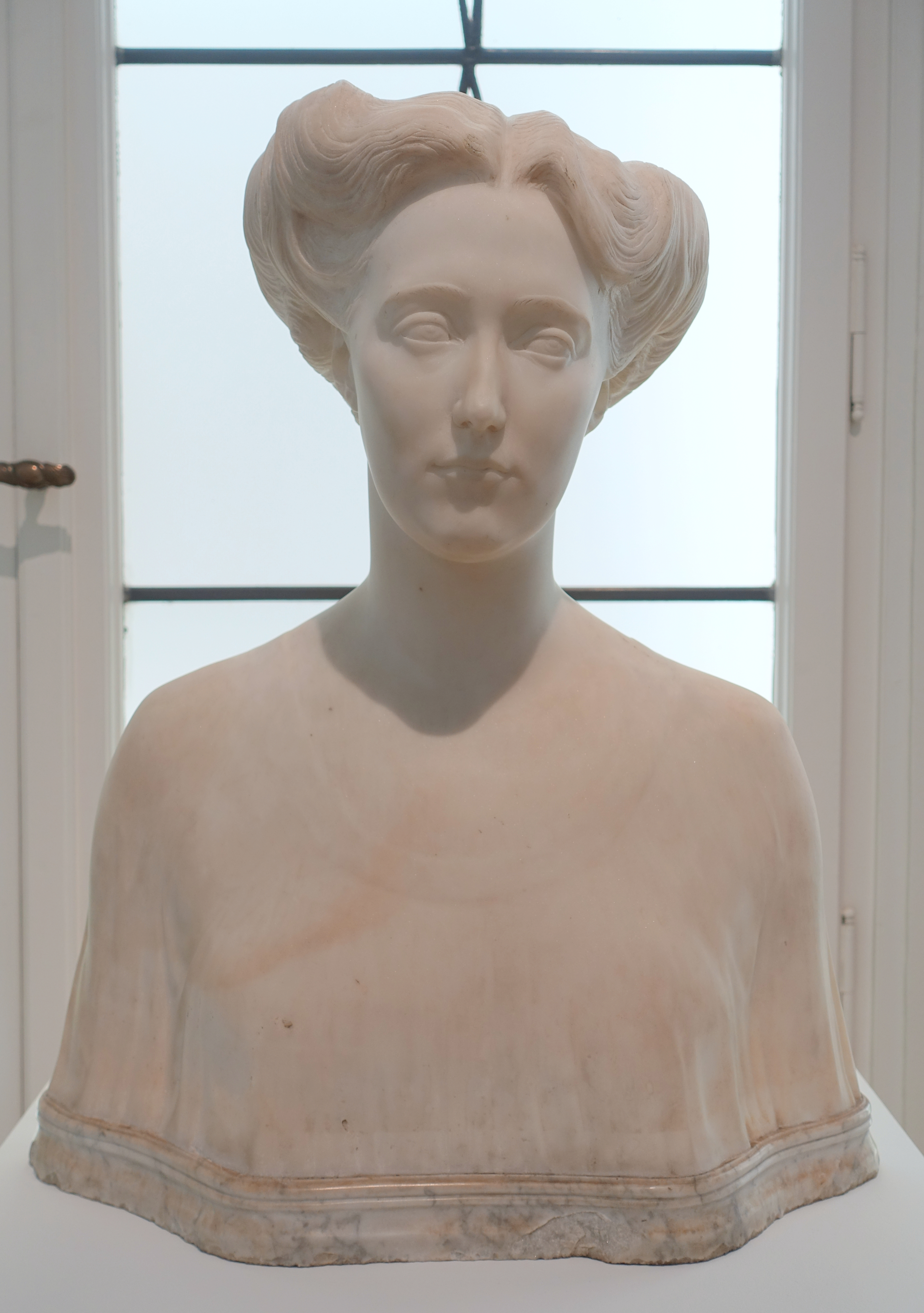
- Marble of Winsloe
- Born: Christa Kate Winsloe; 23 December 1888; Darmstadt, German Empire
- Died: 10 June 1944 (aged 55); Cluny, France
- Partners: Baron Ludwig Hatvany; Dorothy Thompson; Simone Gentet
- Writing career
- Language: German

Christa Winsloe (23 December 1888 – 10 June 1944), formerly Baroness Christa von Hatvany-Deutsch, was a German-Hungarian novelist, playwright and sculptor, best known for her play Gestern und heute (known under several titles, see below), filmed in 1931 as Mädchen in Uniform and the 1958 remake. Winsloe was the first to write a play on female homosexuality in the Weimar Republic, yet without a "radical critique of the social discrimination of lesbian women."

== Early life ==
Christa Kate Winsloe was born in Darmstadt to the military officer Arthur Winsloe and his wife Katharina Elisabeth Scherz. Her mother died unexpectedly in 1900. Upon her death, Christa was sent to the Kaiserin-Augusta-Stift, a very strict boarding school in Potsdam. In this institution, the girls of the aristocracy were drilled to learn discipline and submission. The experience would inspire Winsloe's later body of work: "as an adult Winsloe had to write down this nightmare to get it off her chest."

In 1909, she studied sculpture in Munich (specifically, her interest was sculpting animals), against her family's consent. Sculpture-making was considered an "unfeminine" profession at the time.

In 1913, she married Baron Lajos von Hatvany-Deutsch (1880–1961), a rich Hungarian writer and landowner. Thus, she became known as Baroness Christa von Hatvany-Deutsch. While married to Hatvany, Winsloe began to write Das Mädchen Manuela ("The Child Manuela"), a short novel based on her experiences at Kaiserin-Augusta but held off on publishing. Soon after, her marriage failed, but Hatvany made Winsloe a generous allowance after the divorce.

Winsloe was involved in a relationship with newspaper reporter Dorothy Thompson, probably before World War II when Thompson was reporting from Berlin.

== Career ==
In 1930, Winsloe wrote the play ‘Knight Nerestan’ which was produced in Leipzig and then Berlin under the title Gestern und heute (‘Yesterday and Today'). The play's success led to a 1931 film version called Mädchen in Uniform (Girls in Uniform) with Winsloe as one of the screenwriters. The play ends differently from the film. In the play, the young student, Manuela, is destroyed because of rejection by her teacher, Fräulein Elizabeth von Bernburg, who did not dare to side with Manuela against the headmistress or oppose the brutal educational methods. Manuela commits suicide. The film is more ambiguous, with von Bernburg attempting to defend the student and herself. The film version was also a considerable success, both financially and critically. This was due to its ambitiously aesthetic form and the fact that only women performed in it. The lesbian aspect of the story was downplayed and depicted as an adolescent crush, even though Winsloe co-authored the script, and Leontine Sagan, who in the play had stressed the lesbian aspect, acted as director.

In response to the play and film's downplaying of the lesbian themes, Winsloe completed and published her novel Das Mädchen Manuela (The Child Manuela) in 1933. It was a bolder novelized version of the screenplay that emphasized the lesbian storyline.

Winsloe did not publish anymore after Das Mädchen Manuela because she did not want to write under the rules and conditions of the German Literature Department. Soon enough, all of Winsloe's books and articles were on the Nazi index of "undesired literature". The author was considered as "politically unreliable". During World War II, however, she wrote scripts for G.W. Pabst.

== Personal life and death ==
On the strength of Mädchen in Uniform's acclaim, Winsloe moved to Berlin, where at the time there was a lesbian sub-culture. She had plenty of money (from her ex-husband's allowance), worked as an animal sculptor, and had a wide circle of friends. She was a member of the SPD (the German Social Democrats, then largely reform Marxist in orientation), and was open about her sexuality.

Early in the Third Reich, Winsloe fled the Nazis with her partner, Dorothy Thompson (Thompson had warned against Hitler early on, and was one of the first women to interview him). They spent time in Italy, after which Winsloe followed Thompson to the U.S., but Winsloe did not like it there. Her scripts were rejected by Hollywood producers and she did not want to write in English, so she left Thompson and returned to Europe in 1935. She spent the next years travelling between Italy, France, Hungary, Austria, and Germany.

In October 1939, Winsloe moved south and settled in Cagnes, where she met the Swiss author Simone Gentet. They stayed together during the following years and Gentet translated some of Winsloe's works into French. The two women also offered temporary support and refuge for people fleeing the Nazis.

Following an immediate evacuation order on 10 June 1944, Winsloe and Gentet were falsely accused of being Nazi spies by four Frenchmen. They shot and killed the two women in a forest near the country town of Cluny.

== Works ==
=== Plays ===
- Gestern und heute (1930)
  - Published in English as Children in Uniform (1932)

=== Films ===
- Mädchen in Uniform (1931)

=== Novels ===
- Das Mädchen Manuela (1933)
  - Published in English as The Child Manuela (1934, translated by Agnes Neill Scott)
- Life Begins (1935)
  - Also published in the U.S. as Girl Alone (1936)

==== Unpublished works ====
- Sylvia and Sybille (play, 1931)
- Die halbe Geige (novel, 1935, 'Half the Violin')
