= Emil Sodersten =

Australian architect

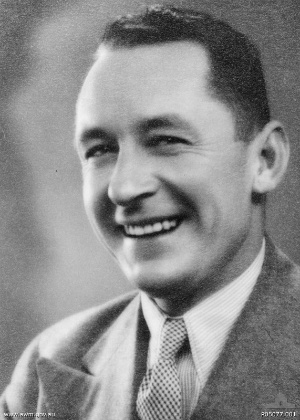
- Studio portrait of Emil Sodersten in 1940
- Born: Emil Lawrence Sodersteen; 30 August 1899; Balmain, Sydney
- Died: 14 December 1961 (aged 62); Manly, Sydney
- Education: Sydney Technical College
- Occupation: Architect
- Spouse: Elsie Vera Wynn (m. 1951)
- Parents: Emil Sodersteen (Snr); Julia Sodersteen
- Buildings: City Mutual Life Assurance (1936); Segenhoe Flats (1937); Nesca House, Newcastle (1939)
- Design: Brisbane City Hall (1920s); Australian War Memorial, Canberra (1925)
- Military career
- Allegiance: Australia
- Branch: Royal Australian Air Force
- Service years: 1942 – 1945
- Rank: Flight lieutenant
- Service number: 266387
- Conflicts: World War II

Emil Lawrence Sodersten (30 August 1899 – 14 December 1961) was an Australian architect active in the second quarter of the 20th century. His work encompassed the Australian architectural styles of Art Deco and Functionalist & Moderne. His design for the Australian War Memorial was "the first national architectural monument in Australia". The Australian Institute of Architects presents the Emil Sodersten Interior Architecture Award annually in his honour.

== Early life and background ==
Sodersten was born in the inner-Sydney suburb of Balmain, the second of seven children born to Julia (née Dolleen) and Emil Sodersteen. Emil Junior and his brothers, Erik and Karl, later changed their surnames by deed poll to Sodersten.

== Architecture career ==
In 1915 at age 16, Sodersten was articled in architecture to the firm of Ross & Rowe and in the ensuing five years studied architecture at Sydney Technical College. During 1921 he also attended lectures at the University of Sydney given by the new Dean of Architecture, Leslie Wilkinson.

The Queensland firm Hall & Prentice was commissioned to design Brisbane City Hall in the early 1920s and Sodersten worked on the project with Bruce Dellit and Peter Kaad. He returned to Sydney in 1923 and was registered as an architect whilst working for John P. Tate & Young. Two years later Sodersten went into private practice. In 1927–28, he became a council-member of the Institute of Architects of New South Wales and was made a fellow of the Royal Australian Institute of Architects in 1931.

He entered the international competition to design the Australian War Memorial in Canberra. His design was considered exceptional but, as with most of those entered, was over budget. The only entry within budget was by John Crust and so the two architects were commissioned to work together on an amended design. Crust project managed the new building to Sodersten's even more monumental design. After conflict arose with Crust, Sodersteen withdrew in 1938.

In Sydney he designed numerous apartment blocks, including Birtley Towers at Elizabeth Bay, and office buildings, including the City Mutual Life Assurance Building, also with Crust. During the 1930s he worked in association with his brothers Erik, an architect, and Karl, a structural engineer. When Emil visited Europe in 1935 he was impressed with the work of Willem Marinus Dudok and Hendrik Petrus Berlage and from then on worked in the functionalist style. In the late 1930s Nesca House, Newcastle was his major project.

After World War II he designed several shopping centres for the Housing Commission of New South Wales, including the Oakes Centre in Westmead and the Broad Oaks building in Ermington. In 1951, he designed a Canberra chancellery and residence for the High Commissioner of Pakistan but the project remains unbuilt. Sodersten designed the Reid Building for St Andrew's College, University of Sydney, completed in 1953.

== Military career ==
During World War II, Sodersten served with the Royal Australian Air Force in Papua and New Guinea and Queensland as a flight lieutenant.

== Personal life ==
Sodersten married 37-year-old secretary, Elsie Vera Wynn, in the Catholic Sacred Heart Church, Pymble on 7 July 1951, age 51.

== Death ==
Sodersten died of a coronary occlusion at home in Manly aged 62, on 14 December 1961 and was survived by his wife.

== Notable projects ==
| Work | Suburb/city | Type | Style | Completed | Involvement | Heritage status | Image | Notes |
|---|---|---|---|---|---|---|---|---|
| Brisbane City Hall | Brisbane | Civic building | Italian Renaissance | 1920s | Co-design | | | |
| Gwydir Flats | Darlinghurst | Residential apartments | Inter-War Georgian revival | 1926 | Architect | City of Sydney local register | | |
| St Peter's Theatre | Erskineville | Cinema | Federation Romanesque | 1927 | Architect | City of Sydney local register | | |
| Birtley Towers | Elizabeth Bay | Residential apartments | Inter-war Art Deco | 1935 | Architect | City of Sydney local register | | |
| Wychbury | Potts Point | Residential apartments | Inter-war Art Deco | c. 1935 | Architect | City of Sydney local register | | |
| City Mutual Life Assurance Building | Sydney CBD | Commercial office building | Inter-war Art Deco | 1936 | Co-architect | NSW SHR | | |
| The Hermitage | Vaucluse | Mansion | Victorian Gothic | 1936 | Restoration (following fire) | Woollahra local register | | |
| Segenhoe Flats | Newcastle | Residential apartments | Inter-war Art Deco | 1937 | Architect | NSW SHR | | |
| Marlborough Hall | Elizabeth Bay | Residential apartments | Inter-war Art Deco | 1938 | Architect | City of Sydney local register | | |
| Nesca House | Newcastle | Commercial office building | Inter-war Art Deco | 1939 | Architect | NSW SHR; City of Newcastle local register | | |
| Bryant House | Sydney CBD | Commercial office building | Inter-war Art Deco | 1939 | Co-architect | City of Sydney local register | | |
| Seven Elizabeth Street | Sydney CBD | Residential apartments | Inter-war Art Deco | 1940 | Architect | City of Sydney local register | | |
| Oakes Centre | Westmead | Shopping centre | | | Architect | | | |
| Broad Oakes building | Ermington | Shopping centre | | | Architect | | | |
| Australian War Memorial | Canberra | War museum | Inter-war Art Deco | 1941 (Involved: 1925-1938) | Design | Commonwealth Heritage List | | |
| Reid Building, St Andrew's College, University of Sydney | Sydney | Residential college | | 1953 | Architect | City of Sydney local register | | |
