= Geza Silberer =

Austrian journalist and author

Gustav A. "Geza" Silberer (1 December 1876 – 5? 8? April 1938) was an Austrian journalist and author of Jewish extraction born in Werschetz who wrote in German under the pseudonym Sil-Vara.

== Biography ==
Gustav Silberer (aka G. Sil-Vara) was a journalist for Neue Freie Presse and a colleague of Theodor Herzl, who was impressed by his work and provided him with encouragement early on in his career.

== Literary career ==
In 1912, while living in London, he and Charles H. Fisher adapted The Playboy of the Western World as Der Held des Westerlands and had it published by Georg Müller and performed at Max Reinhardt's Kammerspiele, Berlin, at the Neue Wiener Bühne in Vienna and at the Stadttheater in Münster.

A contemporary review of Englische Staatsmänner states that it was clear he had spent time in London and had close relations with the political figures he describes. The Vossische Zeitung "Aunt Voss" observes that readers would agreeably surprised to find Asquith, Curzon, Viscount Grey and Churchill treated "not as enemies but as men". His play Ein Tag: Lustspiel in Drei Akten, adapted by theatre director Philip Moeller as Caprice, had a successful run in 1929 at New York's Theatre Guild, then elsewhere.

His play Mädchenjahre einer Königin about the young Queen Victoria was the basis of several movies of the same name in 1936 and 1954

Several of his books are still in print: Ein Wiener Landsturmmann and Ein Tag: Lustspiel in Drei Akten.

== Published works ==
- Londoner Spaziergänge 1914
- Ein Wiener Landsturmmann: Kriegstagebuchaufzeichnungen Aus Galizien 1915
- Englische Staatsmänner (1916) biographies of Asquith, Balfour, Chamberlain, Churchill, Curzon, Bonar Law, Kitchener, Lloyd-George, Rosebery, Parnell and others.
- Die Gitana. Szenen aus dem spanischen Leben um 1830 1916 illustrated by Erhard Amadeus
- Briefe aus der Gefangenschaft 1917
- Es geht weiter: Eine Nacht und ein Epilog 1919
- Warum kommt der Friede nicht zustande 1932

=== Plays ===
- Der Held der westlichen Welt or Der Held des Westerlands adaptation (with Charles H. Fisher) of J. M. Synge's The Playboy of the Western World 1912
- Ein Tag: Lustspiel in drei Akten 1914
- Mädchenjahre einer Königin. Komödie in acht Bildern 1933

== Awards and commemoration ==
Silvaraweg, a street in Döbling, Vienna was named for him in 1966.
