= Some Doves and Pythons =

1966 novel by Sumner Locke Elliott

- First US edition
- Author: Sumner Locke Elliott
- Language: English
- Publisher: Harper & Row (US)
- Publication date: 1966
- Publication place: Australia
- Media type: Print (hardback & paperback)
- Pages: 249

Some Doves and Pythons is a 1966 novel by Sumner Locke Elliott.

It was his second novel following Careful He Might Hear You. Elliott later said "I wanted it to be very different and: (a) I wanted it to have an American setting and (b) I wanted totally different characters."

== Critical reception ==
Martin Levin in The New York Times noted: "There are far more snakes than pigeons in Sumner Locke Elliott's SOME DOVES AND PYTHONS. Which is only natural, since the case of Mr. Elliott's taut tour de force consists of a theatrical talent agent and some of her clients, gathered for a country weekend of fun and Big Deals".

In The Age Neil Jillett commented: "The merits of the new novel are those of a cynical and accurate reporter rather than of an imaginative artist. Mr. Elliott has a fastidious eyes for lapses of dress, amnners and interior decoration, a discerning ear for the nuances of drunken conversation and a talent for acid analysis. There is some tentaive effort to explore, though minor characters, the general theme of alienation, but the novel remains sunstantially the portrait of one woman. And as such it deserves the applause it is bound to receive."

== Notes ==
- Dedication: For Annie Laurie, Maurice and Lucile and others who protect and promote
