= Ronald Mackenzie =

Scottish dramatist (c. 1903–1932)

Ronald Mackenzie (c. 1903 – 12 August 1932) was a Scottish dramatist known for writing two plays, Musical Chairs and The Maitlands before he was killed in a car crash in France.

== History ==
Mackenzie began his stage career as an actor before becoming stage manager for Edgar Wallace, who encouraged his writing.

His Musical Chairs, which chronicled the experiences of an English family in Galicia, Poland, was variously hailed by critics as the best first play and the best play since the (1914–1918) war.

According to one source, Musical Chairs, dubbed "play of the year", was his fourth play but the first to be produced, and then only after five rejections and five rewrites. It was first staged in November 1931 at the Arts Theatre, then transferred to London's West End. American critics were divided as to its merits, but it was picked up by Gilbert Miller in May 1932 and was scheduled for production on the New York stage in the Fall or Winter of 1932–33.

Mackenzie died as the result of a motor vehicle accident near Beauvais, France. His play Musical Chairs was currently enjoying a successful run at the Criterion Theatre, London.

The Maitlands, produced after his death, was praised for clever comic writing in presenting the interactions of an ill-assorted family in the sitting-room of their once fashionable, but now squalid, home in a "dead seaside town". One critic compared his sharp and bitterly ironic writing to that of Tchekov, but with a falsely optimistic final resolution.
