= Ron McKenzie (footballer) =

Australian rules footballer

Personal information
- Full name: Ron McKenzie
- Born: 29 November 1930 (age 95)
- Original team: Ivanhoe Amateurs
- Height: 180 cm (5 ft 11 in)
- Weight: 70 kg (154 lb)

Playing career^{1}
Years	Club	Games (Goals)
1952	Collingwood	4 (0)
1953	Melbourne	1 (0)
Total		5 (0)
- ^{1} Playing statistics correct to the end of 1953.

Ron McKenzie (born 29 November 1930) is a former Australian rules footballer who played with Collingwood and Melbourne in the Victorian Football League (VFL).
