= Doris Fitton =

Actress and stage director (1897–1985)

Dame Doris Fitton DBE
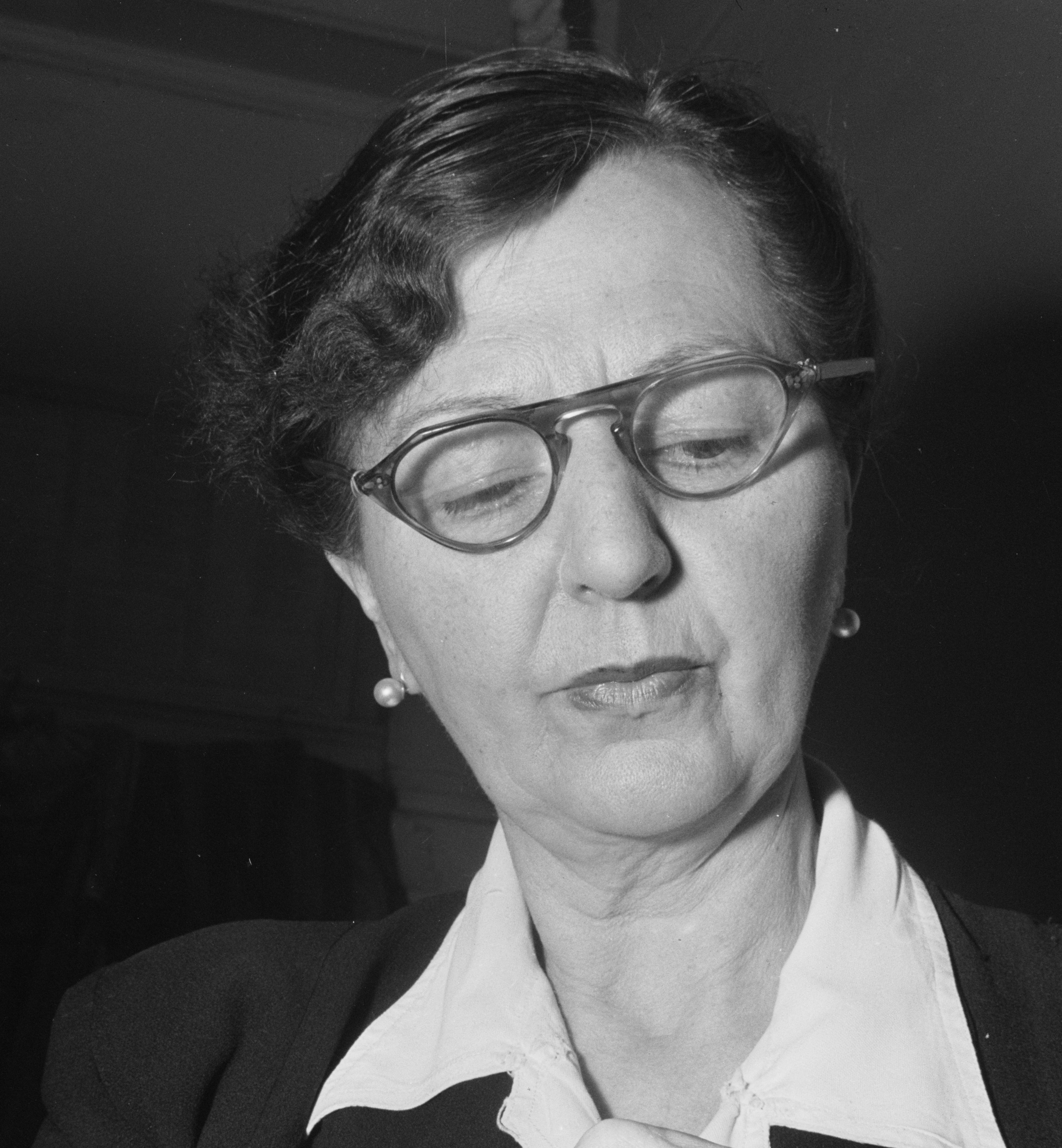
- Fitton in 1950
- Born: Dorotea Alice Lucy Walkden Fitton; 3 November 1897; Santa Ana, Manila, Philippines
- Died: 2 April 1985 (aged 87); North Sydney, New South Wales
- Other names: Doris Mason; Mrs "Tug" Mason
- Occupations: Actress; theatre impresario; theatrical director; producer
- Years active: 1915-1977
- Known for: Establishing with 19 other members The Independent Theatre
- Spouse: Norbert Keck "Tug" Mason (m. 1922-1972; his death)
- Children: 2

Dame Doris Fitton (née Dorotea Alice Lucy Walkden Fitton; 3 November 1897 – 2 April 1985) was an Australian actress and pioneering theatre impresario, and theatrical director and producer who became best known for establishing with 19 other actors The Independent Theatre Ltd. in Sydney in 1930, which operated for some 47 years and produced over 400 productions from Shakespeare to the literary classic repertoire and contemporary American and European theatre.

The Independent staged a diverse range of local and international dramas, many for the first time in Australia, during its tenure playing host to plays including Gwen Meredith's Shout at the Thunder, Sumner Locke Elliott's wartime comedy Rusty Bugles and Max Afford's thriller Lady in Danger.

== Early life ==
Fitton was born in Santa Ana, Manila, Philippines, to English-born accountant and broker Walter Albert and Janet Frazer (née Cameron) Fitton. Her father died when she was young and in 1902, aged five, she relocated to Melbourne, Australia, with her mother and elder sister, Ethel Janet Cameron Fitton (1896–1978). Doris was educated at Loreto Convent, Ballarat and took acting classes at the Melbourne Repertory Company under director Gregan McMahon. Fitton had her first acting role in Melbourne with J. C. Williamson in 1915.

In 1922, Fitton married solicitor Norbert Keck "Tug" Mason in Sydney, where they lived in Chatswood and Potts Point before moving to Berry Street, North Sydney in 1953.

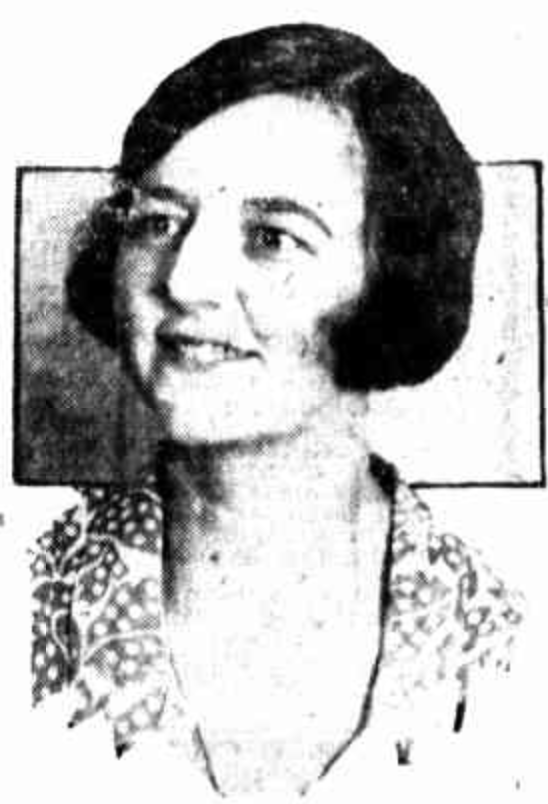
Doris Fitton in 1930

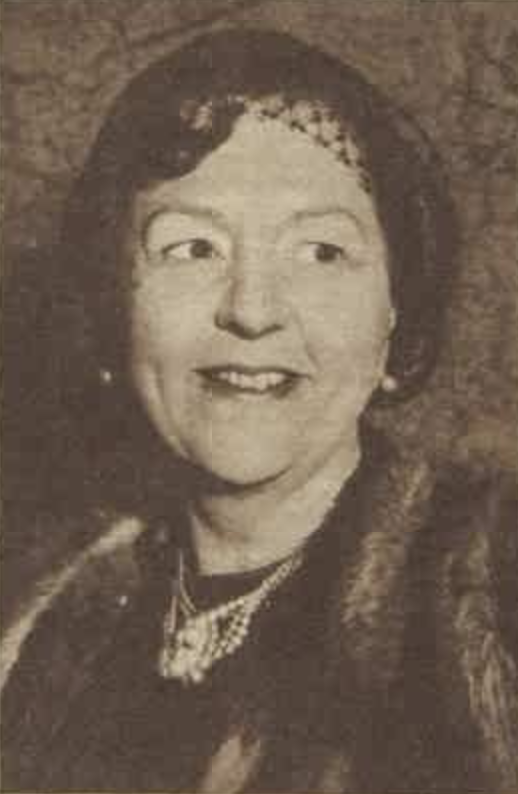
Doris Fitton 1950

== Career ==
Fitton joined the Turret Theatre in 1929, where she was secretary as well as performer. She helped found The Independent Theatre (known then simply as Independent Theatre) in St James' Hall in 1930, taking its name from the Independent Theatre Society founded in London by J. T. Grein. As the company developed, they progressively moved to better premises until in 1939 they took over the old Coliseum in Miller Street, North Sydney.

Doris Fitton was usually producer and director, and frequently acted in productions as a leading lady, and in each of these roles she won praise from the critics. She appeared in the film The Stowaway.

With Doris's failing health, The Independent closed in May 1977. It was reopened in 1998, continuing its tradition as a training ground for young actors and playwrights.

== Independent Theatre alumni ==
Alumni of the theatre include:

- Reg Livermore
- Garry McDonald
- Maggie Dence
- Helen Morse
- Gwen Plumb
- John Appleton, stage and radio producer
- Sumner Locke Elliott, stage producer and writer
- Ruth Cracknell, Australian actress
- Jeanne Little

== Awards ==
She gained public recognition for her commitment to theatre in Australia with her appointments as Officer of Order of the British Empire (OBE) in 1955, as Commander (CBE) in 1975, and as Dame Commander (DBE) in 1982.

== Personal life ==
Doris and "Tug" Mason had two sons, Ewen Richard Cameron Mason (born 19 February 1925) and Malcolm John (born 26 July 1933).

In 1952, they were living at a three-storey flat in Potts Point before moving to North Sydney in 1953. They then lived in a house in Berry St, North Sydney. This house was later demolished to make way for the Northern Expressway. They then moved to Ridge Street, North Sydney, around the corner from The Independent Theatre.

== Death and legacy ==
Doris Fitton published her autobiography, Not Without Heat and Dust, in 1981. She died in North Sydney, on 2 April 1985, aged 87.

A commemorative plaque was unveiled on 17 December 1986 on the footpath in front of the Independent Theatre in her honour, with the famous stanza from William Shakespeare's As You Like It: "All the world's a stage, And all the men and women merely players: They have their exits and their entrances..."

Doris Fitton Park at 1 Little Walker Street, North Sydney, is named for her.

A play, An Independent Woman, aka Doris Fitton, was written by Justin Fleming, and produced at KXT on Broadway on 10 August. 1923.

== Sources ==
- Fitton, Doris (1981). Not without dust and heat: my life in theatre. Sydney: Harper & Row. ISBN 0-06-312035-6.
- Parsons, Philip; Chance, Victoria, eds. (1995). Companion to Theatre in Australia. Sydney: Currency Press, in association with Cambridge University Press. ISBN 0-86-819357-7.
