= Sumner Locke Elliott =

Novelist and playwright

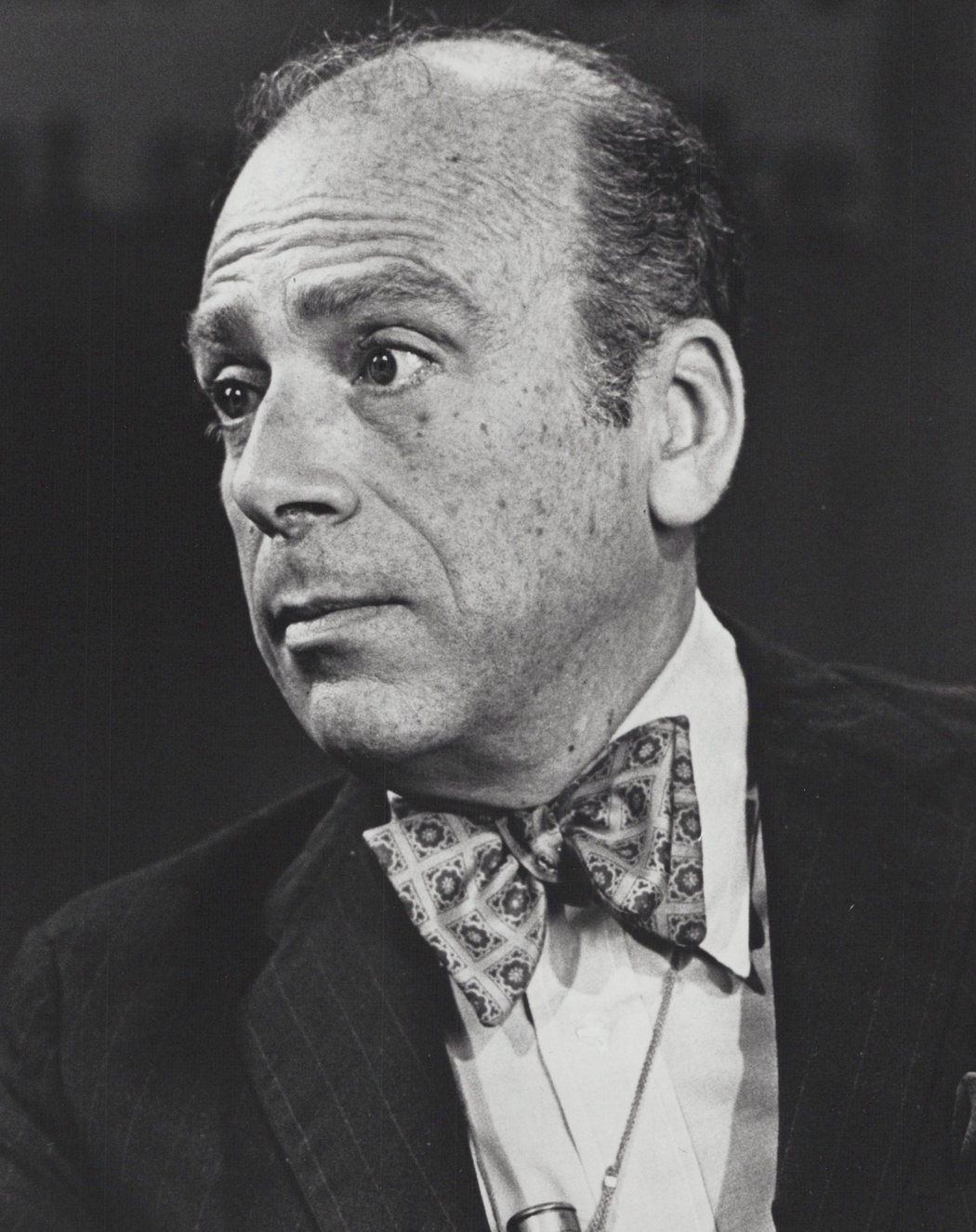
- Elliott in 1972
- Born: 17 October 1917; Sydney, Australia
- Died: 24 June 1991 (aged 73); New York City, United States
- Occupations: Novelist; playwright; radio writer; screenwriter

Sumner Locke Elliott (17 October 1917 – 24 June 1991) was an Australian (later American) novelist and playwright.

== Biography ==
Elliott was born in Sydney to the writer Sumner Locke and the journalist Henry Logan Elliott. His mother died of eclampsia one day after his birth. Elliott was raised by his aunts, who had a fierce custody battle over him, fictionalised in Elliott's autobiographical novel, Careful, He Might Hear You. Elliott was educated at Cranbrook School in Bellevue Hill, Sydney.

== World War II ==
Elliott became an actor and writer with the Doris Fitton's The Independent Theatre Ltd. He was drafted into the Australian Army in 1942 but was not posted overseas, working as a clerk in Australia. He used those experiences as the inspiration for his controversial play, Rusty Bugles. In October 1948, it achieved the notoriety of being closed down for obscenity by the New South Wales Chief Secretary's Office.

== Television ==
Elliott moved to the United States in 1948, writing more than 30 original plays and numerous adaptations for such shows as The Philco Television Playhouse, Kraft Television Theatre, Studio One and Playhouse 90. He also wrote a play, Buy Me Blue Ribbons, which had a short run on Broadway.

In 1955, he obtained United States citizenship and did not return to Australia until 1974. His TV play The Grey Nurse Said Nothing aired on TV in the US and Australia.

== Books ==
Elliott's novel, Careful, He Might Hear You, won the 1963 Miles Franklin Award and was turned into a film in 1983.

== Personal life ==
As a gay man during a time when this was not socially approved, Elliott was uncomfortable with his sexuality. He kept it secret until nearly the end of his life before coming out in his book Fairyland. Because of these fears, Elliott had affairs but never had any stable relationships.

== Death ==
He died of colon cancer aged 73 in New York City in 1991.

== Bibliography ==
=== Novels ===
- Careful, He Might Hear You (1963)
- Some Doves and Pythons (1966)
- Edens Lost (1969)
- The Man Who Got Away (1972)
- Going (1975)
- Water Under the Bridge (1977)
- Rusty Bugles (1980)
- Signs of Life (1981)
- About Tilly Beamis (1985)
- Waiting for Childhood (1987)
- Fairyland (1990)

=== Short stories ===
- Radio Days (1993)

=== Plays ===
- Storm (1931) (one-act)
- The Folly of It (1938)
- Interval (1939)
- The Cow Jumped Over the Moon (1939)
- The Little Sheep Run Fast (1940)
- Goodbye to the Music (1942)
- Your Obedient Servant (1943)
- The Invisible Circus (1946)
- Wicked Is the Vine (first Australian play to be televised in US)
- Rusty Bugles (1948)
- Buy Me Blue Ribbons (1951)
- John Murray Anderson's Almanac (1953)

=== TV plays ===
- "Wicked is the Vine"
- "The Crater"
- "The Girl with the Stop Watch" (1953) and "Beloved Stranger" (1955), for Goodyear Television Playhouse (1955)
- "The Thin Air" (1952), "We Were Children" (1952), "Fadeout" (1953), "Before I Wake" (1953) and "Friday the 13th" (1954) for The Philco Television Playhouse
- "The King and Mrs. Candle" and "The Women" (1956) for Producers' Showcase (1955)
- "Whereabouts Unknown" for The Kaiser-Aluminum Hour (1957)
- "Little Women" (1950), "Babe in the Woods" (1957) and "Love at Fourth Sight" (1957) for Studio One
- "The Count of Monte Cristo" (1958), "The Winslow Boy" (1958) and "The Prisoner of Zenda" (1961) for Dupont Show of the Month
- "Keyhole" (1956), "Daisy! Daisy!" (1956) and "You and Me and the Gatepost" (1956) for Playwrights '56
- "I Heard You Calling Me" (1961), for Way Out
- "Mrs. Gilling and the Skyscraper" (1957) for The Alcoa Hour
- "Dusty Portrait" (1952), "Wish on the Moon" (1953), Time Bomb and "Run Girl Run" (1954) for The Philco Television Playhouse.
- "Peter Pan" (1960) starring Mary Martin
- "Notorious" (1962) and "Spellbound" (1962) for Theatre 62

=== Radio plays ===
- Crazy Family (1939) - serial
- Jezebel's Daughter (1941) - serial
- Tradesman's Entrance (1941) - radio serial
- Grand City (1942) - serial
- Scarlet Rhapsody - serial
- The Army Hour (1944)
- Lily Parker
- "Wicked is the Vine" – Lux Radio Theatre (1947)
- Ride a Cock Horse (play)
- "Fade Out" (1953) for Philco Radio Playhouse
