= The Queer Affair at Kettering =

- Wireless Weekly 26 Oct 1940
- Genre: drama
- Running time: 60 mins (8:15 pm – 9:15 pm)
- Country of origin: Australia
- Language: English
- Home station: 2FC
- Syndicates: ABC
- Starring: Peter Finch; Neva Carr Glynn
- Written by: Max Afford
- Directed by: Dion Wheeler
- Original release: 1 November 1940

The Queer Affair at Kettering is a 1940 Australian radio drama by Max Afford starring his detective hero Jeffrey Blackburn and his wife Elisabeth. Unlike many Blackburn adventures, it was not a serial but a one-off mystery.

Afford was asked to write play quickly after the success of the earlier Jeffrey Blackburn serial Grey Face. Broadcast was pushed back from September to November.

As with The Mysterious Mr. Lynch and Grey Face the two leads were played by Peter Finch and Neva Carr Glynn. The play was enthusiastically by audiences received. (However the next Blackburn serial, It Walks by Night had different stars in the leads which upset some listeners.)

Reviewing the production, Wireless Weekly said "Mr. Afford compels admiration by the way he builds suspense and then allows it to dangle while he injects human interest. That tea-and-toast interlude, for instance. Very engaging. Peter Finch, as Blackburn, and Neva Carr-Glyn, as Beth, performed with their usual aplomb. But, in this case, the players are less important than the play. In brief: Fine fun."

The play was produced again several times in Australia, including in 1943 and 1946.

The play was also produced for BBC radio in two different versions, one in 1945 starring Ivan Brandy and Lydia Sherwood, the other in 1946, starring Frank Allenby and Sherwood.

== Premise ==
According to a press release, "Elizabeth Blackburn took husband Jeffery — much against his will — down to Kettering Old House, recently rented by those inveterate practical jokers, Sally and Jim Rutland. Here they met Rutland's Aunt Florence; Lambert, the detective novelist; and Wishart, the financier. Here, too, they learned of the mysterious room— a room in which people vanished in the twinkling of an eye. Of course, it was all fantastic — until, one by one, the household began to disappear!"

== The Vanishing Trick ==
Afford adapted the script into a 1948 short story called The Vanishing Trick which appeared the magazine Detective Fiction. Arthur Upfield was an admirer of the story.
