= The Night Watchman (radio series) =

1940 Australian radio series

- Genre: anthology drama
- Running time: 30 mins (8:00 pm – 8:30 pm)
- Country of origin: Australia
- Language: English
- Syndicates: ABC
- Starring: Bert Barton
- Created by: W.W. Jacobs
- Written by: Max Afford
- Directed by: John Cairns
- Original release: August 5, 1940
- No. of series: 1
- No. of episodes: 12

The Night Watchman is a 1940 Australian radio series by Max Afford based on the story by W. Jacobs. It was an anthology series based on different stories by Jacobs, all narrated by a night watchman. The show replaced Afford's Grey Face.

Bert Barton played the Nightwatchman, who narrated the stories.

Reviewing the first episode Wireless Weekly said the series "will give pleasure to a specialised audience... These stories have an undoubted human interest. If working class philosophy appeals to you, and you find the dialect pleasant to your ears, you will be a constant listener."

The series was popular. It was repeated again later that year and rebroadcast in 1945 (directed by Frank Harvey) and 1948.

== Select episodes ==
- Ep 1 – "Friends in Need" (5 August) – "Mr. Joe Gibbs, Mr. Brown and Mr. Kidd, standing in the Red Lion Hotel one afternoon, had a bright idea. Instead of looking for work, why not get money the easy way? So, they arranged that Mr. Gibbs should be reported as drowned, and that Mr. Kidd and Mr. Brown should get up a compensation meeting in the Red Lion, raise a comfortable sum for the widow and then split it three ways. Mr. Gibbs agreed to sacrifice his precious whiskers for the job which led to all manner of unforeseen complications."
- Ep 2 – "Weaker Vessel" (12 August)
- Ep 3 – "Fairy Gold" (19 August) – "That was an unlucky day in which Mr. Augustus Teak learned that his wife Emily, had three hundred pounds hidden somewhere in their Wapping cottage. Mr. Teak and his friend. Mr. Chase, determined to find that money. While Mr. Teak <?pent good money taking his wife on pleas are trips. Mr. Chase stayed at home lo search. Ycu will hear iio\v a bus drive and a shower of rain threw the plans of this precious pair all awry, and how the "fairy gold" wag lifted from its hiding place virtually under their noses."
- Ep 4 – "The Madness of Mr Lister" (26 August) – "The play tells of a mean sailor and his endeavors to extract free drinks from his mates by all manner of ingenious plots."
- Ep 5 – "The Constable’s Move" (2 September) – "It’s a disgrace to Mulberry Gardens to ’ave a copper come an’ live in it, said Bob Grummit indignantly, an’ to come an’ live next door ter me! That was the crowning irony, so Grummit made up his mind that the constable must be made to move. But in Spite of Bob Grummit's elaborate plans, edging Constable Evans out of Mulberry Gardens was much harder than he had foreseen. All Grummit's schemes worked the wrong way, and the complications which arose provide many a chuckle in this latest of the nightwatchman's stories.
- Ep 6 – "The Vigil" (9 September) – "George Farrar loved Nancy Ward but the lady's father frowned down on poor George’s five feet four, and announced that when his daughter married, it would be to a man and not to a cockroach."
- Ep 7 – "Fine Feather" (16 September) – "It was an unfortunate day for Harry Jobson, the Wapping green-grocer, when his wife decided that she would dress her husband like a gentleman."
- Ep 8 – "For Better For Worse" (23 September) – "I’ve ’ad a shock,” said Mr. Ben Davis to Mr. Wotton, in the bar of the Bunch of Grapes. "My ol’ woman that left me thirty-five years ago ’as turned up!" And when Mr. Davis learned that his wife had turned up a comfortably-off widow with a house of her own, he was even more eager to effect a reconciliation. But thirty-five years can change a woman in mapy-ways. as Ben Davis was to find."
- Ep 9 – "Back to Back" (30 September)
- "Dual Control" – "Albert Sharp and Jack Butler both loved Florrie Garland, pretty niece of the Culpeppers. But whereas Mrs. Culpepper and Florrie preferred Butler, Mr. Culpepper liked the parsimonious Mr. Sharp. The women decided on a plan to show Mr. Sharp in his true colours."
- "Old Man of the Sea" – "Mr. George Wright wanted to impress his lady-love, Miss Bella Bradshaw. To this end, he hired Albert Kemp to pose as his rich uncle from New Zealand. Mr. Kemp was more than willing, particularly as the “wherewithal” for the masquerade came out of George's pocket. But the apparent munificence of this old gentle-man attracted the mercenary sense of Bella's mother, and what transpired forms the basis of one of the Nightwatchman's most amusing stories."
