= Murder's Not for Middle Age =

1930 Australian radio drama

- Daily Telegraph 16 August 1953
- Genre: serial drama
- Running time: 30 mins (8:30 pm – 9:00 pm)
- Country of origin: Australia
- Language: English
- Home station: 2FC
- Syndicates: ABC
- Written by: Max Afford
- Produced by: Max Afford
- Original release: August 1953 – 1953
- No. of series: 1
- No. of episodes: 12

Murder's Not for Middle Aged is a 1953 Australian radio serial by Max Afford featuring his detective hero, Jeffrey Blackburn. It was the last of Afford's Blackburn serials.

== Premise ==
According to ABC Weekly, "Jeffrey and Elizabeth have retired to a cottage at Sevenoaks, Kent, where Jeffery is growing tulips. Elizabeth now needs the aid of reading glasses. Jeffery has become a martyr to rheumatism, and his violent detective experiences in the past have resulted in a slipped knee cartilage. When Jeffery awakes on the morning of his 45th birthday, he little realises that he and Elizabeth are to be involved in the most fantastic and macabre case they have ever tackled. They are reluctant to be drawn in, but crime and destiny have their way."

== Cast ==
- Lyndall Barbour as Elizabeth Blackburn
- Nigel Lovell as Jeffrey Blackburn
- John Tate as Chief-Inspector Read

== Critical reception ==
The Brisbane Truth called it "well produced and enjoyable."

The Adelaide Mail said " the story got away to a dramatic start with a BBC reporter giving an eye witness account of police fighting it out with a trapped bandit. If anything it was a little too dramatic— it took me five minutes to catch up with what was going on."

The Adelaide Advertiser called it "irritatingly mediocre."

Another review in the same paper said "The mixture is much as Mr. Afford has given it to us before with demonology, witchcraft, beautiful aristocrats and even a count from Czechoslovakia... 'Ten years ago,' said one character, 'it would have been fun.' I would put that as about 20 years too early."
