= Lady in Danger =

Lady in Danger may refer to:

- Lady in Danger (film), a 1934 British comedy thriller film
- Lady in Danger (stage play), a 1942 play by Max Afford
- Lady in Danger (radio drama), a 1955 Australian radio play based on the stage play
- Lady in Danger (TV play), a 1959 Australian television play based on the stage play
