= Willunga, South Australia =

Willunga
- Suburb
- Coordinates: 35°16′26″S 138°33′13″E
- Country: Australia
- State: South Australia
- Region: Southern Adelaide
- City: Adelaide
- LGA: City of Onkaparinga
- Location: 47 km (29 mi) from Adelaide
- Established: 1840

Government
  - State electorate: Mawson
  - Federal division: Mayo

Population
  - Total: 2,445 (SAL 2021)
- Time zone: UTC+9:30 (ACST)
  - Summer (DST): UTC+10:30 (ACST)
- Postcode: 5172
- County: Adelaide
- Mean max temp: 19.4 °C (66.9 °F)
- Mean min temp: 7.5 °C (45.5 °F)
- Annual rainfall: 756.3 mm (29.78 in)
Suburbs around Willunga
Tatachilla	McLaren Vale	The Range
Whites Valley	Willunga	Montarra
Pages Flat	Willunga South	Willunga Hill

Willunga is a town located to the south of Adelaide, South Australia in the City of Onkaparinga (a local government area). It is 47 km by road from the Adelaide city centre and 12 km from the coast at Aldinga Bay. Willunga is within the McLaren Vale wine-growing region. In the 2021 census, Willunga had a population of 3,604.

== History ==
The name Willunga derives from a Kaurna place name whose meaning is uncertain. Willunga Post Office opened on 14 July 1839. Willunga is well known for its slate industry, which began in 1840 when a farmer named Edward Loud found slate on his property and later that year opened the first slate quarry. The Old Police Station and Court House stands at 61 High Street, its foundations laid in 1855 using stone quarried nearby. Initially serving as a female immigration depot until 1872, it underwent significant expansions in 1864.

Just across High Street lies the Old Post and Telegraph Station, a historical counterpart to its neighbor. Its original single-story segment, erected in 1857, housed the essential services of the Post Office, Telegraph Station, and the Postmaster's living quarters. A subsequent addition in 1864 expanded its capacity. By 1865, a two-story extension further enhanced its functionality.

In 1916, the building ceased its postal and telegraph operations, eventually finding new ownership in 1935. However, its legacy endured as it underwent meticulous restoration in 1986, preserving its historical significance for future generations.

== Commerce ==
Being one of South Australia's earliest towns, Willunga is a small country town which attracts many visitors. Businesses in Willunga include coffee shops, eateries, a post office, a general store, three hotels, and one fuel station.

== Religion ==
There are four churches: Anglican, Roman Catholic, Uniting, and Pentecostal.

== Tourism ==
The Willunga Golf Course and Bowling Club are located on the northern side of the town. The Coast to Vines Rail Trail skirts the golf course and connects cyclists and walkers to the town of McLaren Vale. The Willunga Basin Trail is a 130 km walking route which passes through the town.

Historic buildings open to the public include the Old Willunga Courthouse and Police Station complex, the Slate Museum, the Bassett Boys Schoolroom and Waverley Park Homestead.

Willunga hosts a stage of the Tour Down Under cycle race every summer which often finishes at the top of Willunga Hill. The town also hosts the Almond Blossom Festival each July and the Fleurieu Folk Festival in October. The Willunga Farmers Market is held every Saturday morning.

== Media ==
Tribe FM 91.1 is an Australian community radio station which broadcasts from Willunga. It is run by volunteers and services the mid-south coast and surrounding areas. The station live streams online and has some additional on-demand programs available on their website. The station won the 2018 SACBA Bilby Award for sports broadcasting. The team responsible for the winning program includes the South Australian parliamentarian, Katrine Hildyard.

Willunga was home to a short-lived publication, printed by Matthew Goode, known as the Willunga Bulletin (1907). A generic medical broadsheet, it was essentially a four-page promotion for the American-based Dr Sheldon's medicines.

== Sports ==
Willunga has many sporting teams, including a football team (the Demons); a football team for students; a netball club, a basketball club, tennis club and a cricket club.

Willunga has a soccer club, the Willunga Phoenix, who play in the Noarlunga & Districts Junior Soccer Association and Adelaide Hills Junior Football Association.

== Walking and cycling trails ==
The Coast to Vines rail trail finishes at Willunga.

== Education ==
Willunga has three schools serving the town and local area: Willunga Waldorf Steiner School (K–12), Willunga Primary School and kindergarten, and Willunga High School, which opened on its present site in 1960.

Prior to 1960, tertiary education was provided at the Willunga Higher Primary School for years 8 to 11. It was situated in school buildings at the corner of Main Road and Aldinga road. It closed at the end of 1959 when the new Willunga High School was completed on Main road north of the town.

== National Broadband Network deployment ==
Willunga was chosen as one of the first five release areas for the National Broadband Network. The town was chosen to demonstrate archetypal FTTH deployment in a regional area with dispersed housing, providing a live test for similar deployments across the future NBN. The construction phase occurred in early 2011 and the first customer service went live on 27 June 2011.

== Notable people ==
Notable people who are from or who have lived in Willunga include Fanny Elizabeth de Mole, author and illustrator of Wild flowers of South Australia (1861), the first book on wildflowers in the state.

The town is the setting for the 1930 radio play The Clock Strikes Twelve by Max Afford.
