= Cats Creep at Night =

Australia radio play by Max Afford

Cats Creep at Night is a 1930 Australia radio play by Max Afford.

It was Afford's first radio play, written while he was still a journalist, and it earned him one guinea. He later said it was "an hour of everything in the blood and thunder line — a haunted house, a thunderstorm, car smashes, a madman."

Afford directed it himself for Adelaide radio station 5CL. The play was very popular and was repeated by popular demand. Afford later said "although I blush now to think of it, it was repeated three times after the original performance."

Afford followed it with another similar play, Blackmail.
