= Fanny Elizabeth de Mole =

British born botanical artist

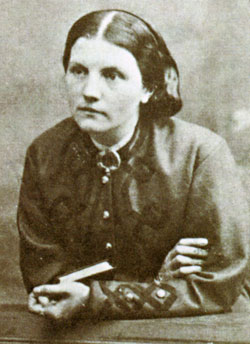
- Born: 1 March 1835; London
- Died: 26 December 1866; Willunga
- Occupation: Botanical illustrator

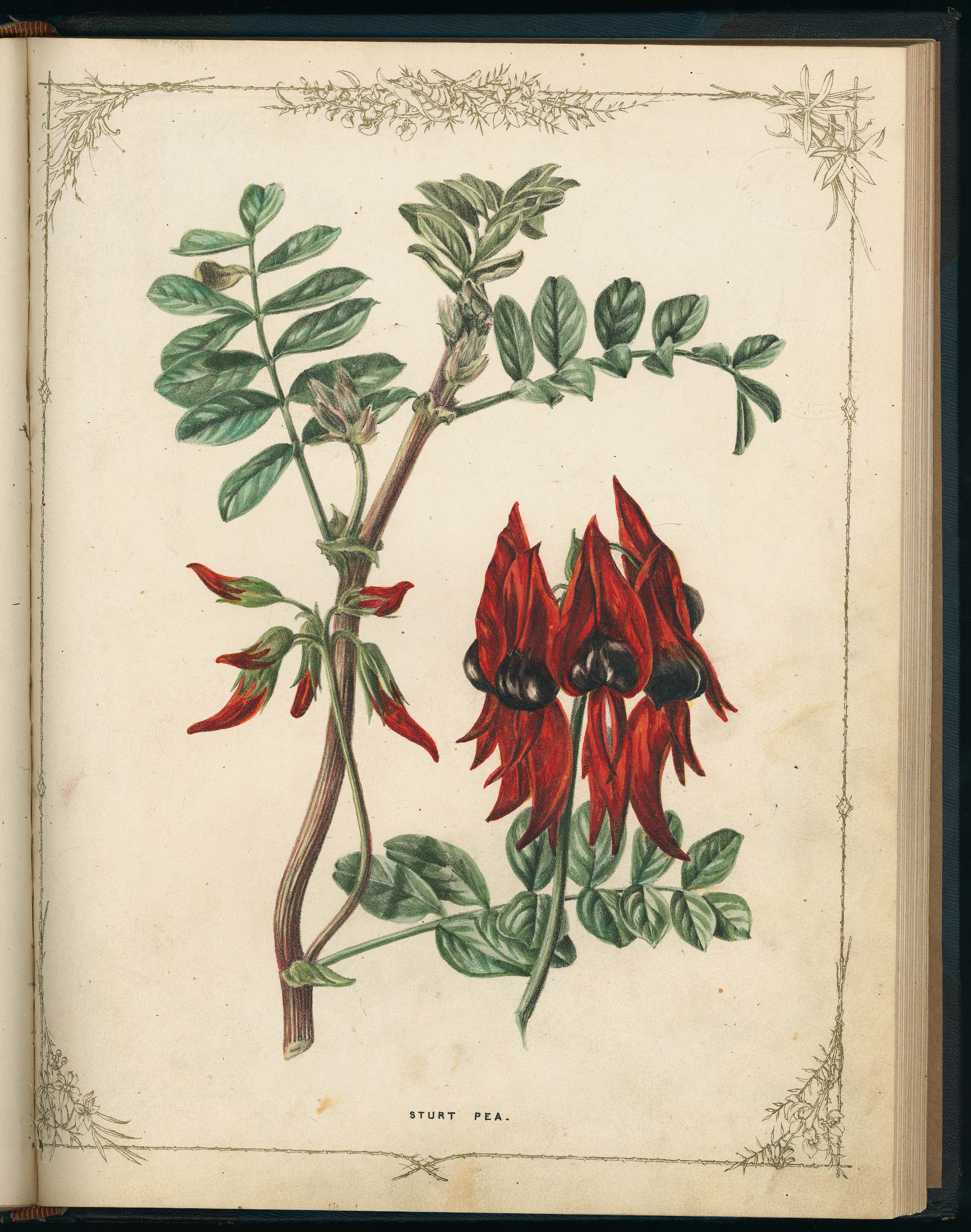
Illustration of Sturt's Desert Pea from Fanny Elizabeth de Mole's "Wild Flowers of South Australia" (1861)

Fanny Elizabeth de Mole (1 March 1835 - 26 December 1866) was a botanical artist who illustrated the first book of flora from the colony of South Australia.

De Mole was born in the residential rooms of Merchant Taylors Hall, London. Her father was John Bamber De Mole and her mother Isabel was the daughter of engineer Henry Maudslay. She migrated to South Australia in 1857 to join two of her brothers.

She wrote and illustrated the first book on wildflowers in that state, Wild flowers of South Australia in 1861. In order to achieve colour quality which would not weaken through the printing process, lithographs of the illustrations were prepared in England by Paul Jerrard & Son and hand-coloured in Australia. The book contains 20 hand-coloured lithographed plates. There were an estimated 100 copies made of the original edition of Wildflowers of South Australia, and it is quite difficult to obtain. In 2014 a copy of the book sold at Christie's for $3,750. A facsimile edition of the book was published by Queensbury Hill Press in 1981.

De Mole won prizes for her paintings at the 1865 exhibition of the South Australian Society of Arts.

Five years after her book was published Fanny Elizabeth de Mole died from tuberculosis at Willunga, South Australia.
