= The House of Hangings =

The House of Hangings is a 1935 Australian radio play by Max Afford. it was called a "seasonal thriller.

It was based on a short story by Afford "The Temple of Nukahiva" written in the 1920s.
