= Ryan Scott (wheelchair rugby) =

Australian wheelchair rugby player

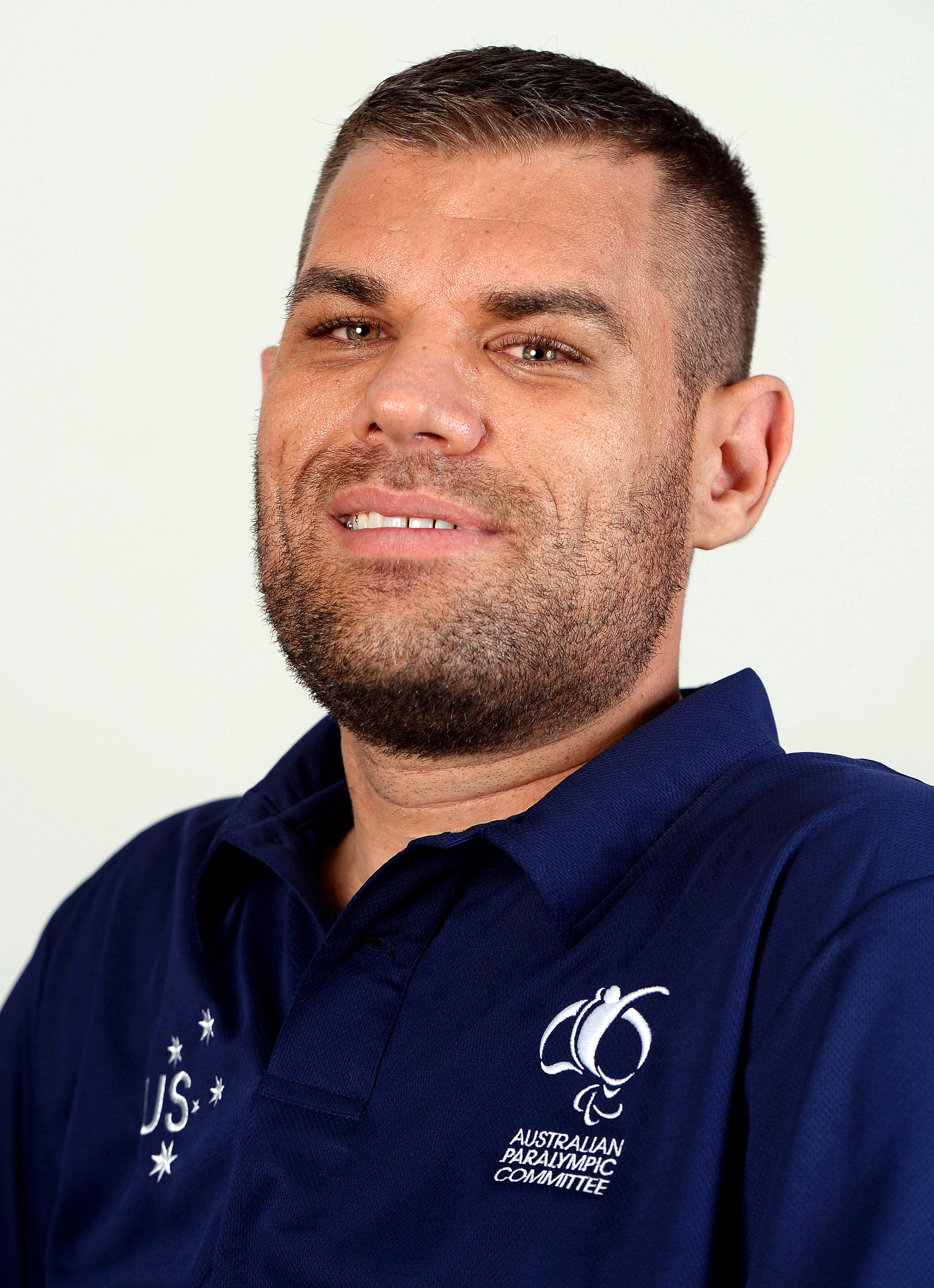
- 2016 Australian Paralympic team portrait of Scott

Personal information
- Nationality: Australia
- Born: 3 March 1982 (age 44) Brisbane

Sport
- Disability class: 0.5
Medal record
Wheelchair rugby
Paralympic Games
Silver medal – second place	2008 Beijing	Mixed
Gold medal – first place	2012 London	Mixed
Gold medal – first place	2016 Rio	Mixed
World Championships
Silver medal – second place	2010 Vancouver	Mixed
Gold medal – first place	2014 Odense	Mixed
Silver medal – second place	2018 Sydney	Mixed

Ryan Scott, OAM (born 3 March 1982) is a Paralympic wheelchair rugby competitor from Australia. In four Paralympics, Scott has won a silver medal at the 2008 Beijing Paralympics and gold medals at the 2012 London and 2016 Rio Paralympics.

== Personal ==
Scott was born on 3 March 1982. On 6 June 1998 as a 16-year-old, he became a quadriplegic due to a car crash on a country road en route to Victor Harbor, South Australia. At the time of the accident, he was a year 11 student at Willunga High School. The accident left Scott paralysed from his chest down but he has some movement in his shoulders, back, biceps and forearms. He moved to Brisbane from Adelaide in 2009 due to the warm weather and due to Queensland having a good wheelchair rugby program.

== Wheelchair rugby ==
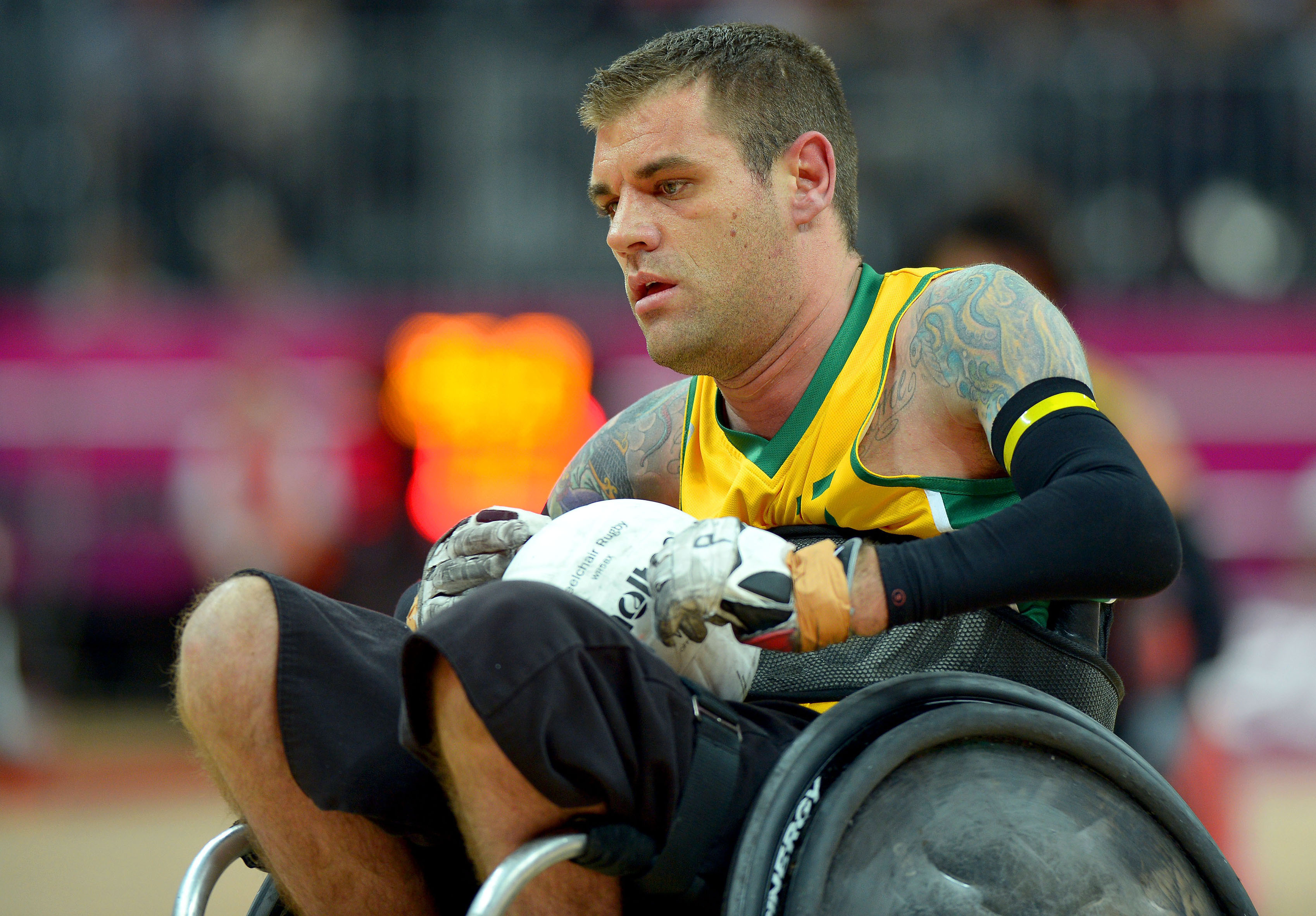
Scott at the 2012 London Paralympics

Scott took up wheelchair rugby as part of his rehabilitation. Scott said "I always loved sport and participated in all kinds of sport – soccer, basketball, Aussie rules, pretty much every sport except able-bodied rugby. As a quadriplegic, I didn’t have the upper-body strength to play wheelchair basketball. When I saw wheelchair rugby, that’s when I thought that sport was still possible." Scott made his debut for the Australian team 'Steelers' in August 2001. He was a member of the Steelers that came fifth at the 2004 Athens Paralympics. He won a silver medal at the 2008 Beijing Games in the mixed wheelchair rugby event. He won a gold medal at the 2012 London Games in the mixed wheelchair rugby event.

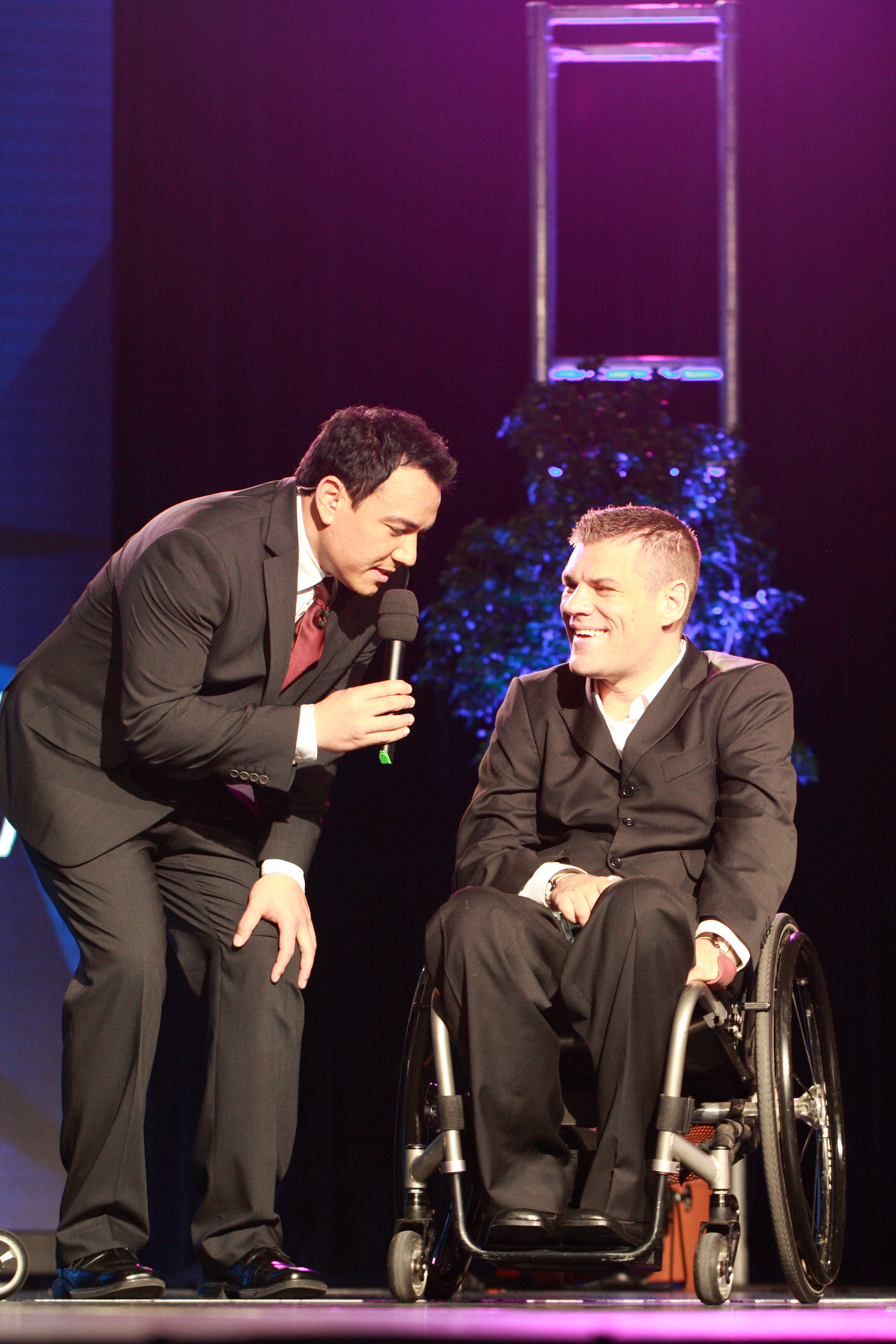
Scott being interviewed on behalf of his team after winning the Australian 2012 Team of the Year

He was a member of the Steelers that finished with the silver medal at the 2010 World Championships and gold medal at the 2014 World Wheelchair Rugby Championships at Odense, Denmark.

Scott captained the Australian team that retained its gold medal at the 2016 Rio Paralympics after defeating the United States 59–58 in the final.

At the 2018 World Championships in Sydney, he was a member of the Australian team that won the silver medal after being defeated by Japan 61–62 in the gold medal game.

During his career he was co-captain and captain of the Steelers (2012–2016) and played for the Suncorp Queensland Cyclones in the Wheelchair Rugby National League.

Scott said "because of wheelchair rugby I’ve been able to travel the world playing a team sport, I have represented my county at three Paralympic Games, which is huge. It has also made me a much more independent person."

In September 2018, after 288 Steelers games, he announced his retirement from international wheelchair rugby.

== Recognition ==
- 2012 - Order of Australia (OAM) - for service to sport as a gold medallist at the London 2012 Paralympic Games.
- 2015 - Sporting Wheelie of the Year - Sporting Wheelies and Disabled Association
- 2016 - Senior Male Athlete of the Year - Sporting Wheelies and Disabled Association with Chris Bond.
