= Oh, Whistle When You're Happy =

1938 radio play by Max Afford

- Genre: drama play
- Running time: 60 mins (8:00 pm – 9:00 pm)
- Country of origin: Australia
- Language: English
- Home station: 2BL
- Written by: Max Afford
- Directed by: Lawrence H Cecil
- Original release: July 28, 1938

Oh, Whistle When You're Happy is a 1938 Australian radio play by Max Afford.

The play was produced again in 1939 and 1941.

Afford sold the play to British radio.

== Premise ==
"When Joe Polinsky, master ventriloquist, died, as the result of an accident, he left his doll to his wife, Connie, whose conscience was far from clear on the subject of her husband's death. Connie married Edward Harmon, a trapeze artist, and from that time a. singular nemesis shadowed their lives. Could it have been, as Connie vowed, that a dead man’s vengeance animated a wooden puppet, or was it, as her husband declared, all coincidence? Guilty conscience or Black Magic—it might have been either. Beginning with a study in the macabre the author presents a problem which the listener must answer for himself."
