= Death's Mannikins =

1937 novel by Max Afford

Deaths Mannikins
- Author: Max Afford
- Language: English
- Series: Jeffrey Blackburn
- Genre: detective
- Publisher: John Long
- Publication date: 1937
- Publication place: Australia

Death's Mannikins is a 1937 Australian novel by Max Afford. It was the second Jeffrey Blackburn novel following Blood on His Hands.

The book was originally known as Death Plays with Dolls. Afford said the plot took two months to work out. He wrote it while waiting to hear if his first Blackburn novel had been accepted. Unlike Blood on His Hands, this one had an English setting.

The novel was published in London eight weeks after Blood on his Hands.

The Australasian said the book "fulfils the expectations raised by its description as "a series of macabre murders." They are macabre enough, and being staged, in a gloomy Exmoor valley should satisfy the most avid pursuer of the thriller."

The book was read on radio in serialised form in 1939. It was republished in 1945.
