= Kester Berwick =

Australian actor

- Born: Frank Perkins; 3 October 1903; Adelaide, South Australia
- Died: 29 June 1992 (aged 88); Gastouri, Corfu
- Occupation: Actor

Kester Berwick (3 October 1903 – 29 June 1992) was an Australian actor and writer who spent the latter part of his life in Greece.

== Biography ==
Born Frank Gale Perkins in Adelaide, South Australia, he changed his name to Kester Baruch after a friend told him that would sound "less plebeian", than changed it again to Kester Berwick at the beginning of World War II, when he was living in Switzerland. He founded the experimental Ab-Intra Studio Theatre in Adelaide with Alan Harkness in 1931. In 1935, the two men closed Ab-Intra and went to Europe.

Berwick studied at Dartington Hall, Devon, England, with Michael Chekhov a former student of Stanislavski, for four years from 1936 to 1937. After World War II broke out he returned to Australia to spend this time teaching. In the 1940s he was involved in directing plays at The Hut, now part of the University of Adelaide Theatre Guild. He then taught for five years in London from 1955.

Berwick settled in Mithymna (Molyvos), on the island of Lesbos in 1960, later moving to Gastouri, Corfu in 1969 where he lived until his death at the age of 89 in 1992.

== Personal life and legacy ==
Berwick was gay. His life is the subject of one of the storylines in Robert Dessaix's novel Corfu.

== Plays and publications ==
- 1932: directed with Alan Harkness, The Demon's Mask, at Ab-Intra
- 1932: directed with Alan Harkness, The Robe of Yama with Thelma Thomas, at Ab-Intra
- 1934: produced with Alan Harkness, Jacques Copeau's The House Into Which We Are Born and Jean-Jacques Bernard's Martine, at Ab-Intra
- 1944: directed with Brian Elliott, Evening for Young Folk, a play at The Hut, Adelaide.
- 1945: director, The Stronger, by August Strindberg.
- 1946: director, Swirling, by Denys Amiel and André Obey.
- 1948: director, The Rape of Lucrece, by André Obey.
- 1949 Berwick, Kester (1949), Becoming an actor : a practical approach with studies and exercises, W.E.A. Press

His novel, Head of Orpheus Singing, was published in 1973.
