= Sacrifice at Dawn =

- Genre: drama play
- Running time: 30 mins (8:30 pm – 9:00 pm)
- Country of origin: Australia
- Language: English
- Home station: 5CL
- Written by: Max Afford
- Directed by: Max Afford
- Recording studio: Adelaide
- Original release: November 12, 1934

Sacrifice at Dawn is a 1934 Australian radio drama by Max Afford. It was a one act war drama broadcast to commemorate the anniversary of Armistice Day.

The climax involved some of the most complex radio effects in Australia at the time.

The play was well received and performed again in 1936.

In 1935 Afford wrote a similarly themed play War to End War.

== Premise ==
According to one account "the action takes place a short interval before dawn when an English officer and a German private find themselves in the same shell-hole. The knowledge that at dawn a barrage is coming over, a barrage that must sweep them from the earth, brings some interesting revelations and the play ends on a high note of sacrifice."

== Cast ==
- Frank Johnston as the man
- Donald Richardson as the boy
