= Dark Enchantment =

Play by Max Afford

- Daily Mirror 15 July 1949
- Original language: English
- Written by: Max Afford
- Based on: Sleep No More by Max Afford
- Genre: thriller

Premiere
- Date: June 27, 1949
- Place: Minerva Theatre, Sydney
- Directed by: Fifi Banvard

Dark Enchantment is a 1949 Australian play by Max Afford.

It was based on a 1943 play by Afford called Sleep No More

== Premise ==
Set in a London theatrical boarding house in 1895. A young girl, Julie, whose mother runs the house, receives an inheritance from a foreign ventriloquist, Kurtner: his doll, £1,000, and an accompanying "dark enchantment".

== Production history ==
Dark Enchantment premiered at the Minerva Theatre in Kings Cross Sydney in 1949.

Afford's wife, Thelma, designed costumes for that production. The cast included Neva Carr Glynn and Grant Taylor.

== Reception ==
The Sun 21 Jun 1949

Reviews were mixed. The Daily Telegraph said the play "left most of its thrills to explanatory— and trite — dialogue."

The Sydney Morning Herald said Afford "proves his ability to lease with suspense and to administer shocks of horror. He can tell a story with macabre inventiveness and ingenious twists... The weakness of Max Afford's play fies in much of the dialogue, which is in parts trite, and in other parts... not true to character... If his inventiveness in action, which achieves a master stroke in the approach of whistling outside the window at the end of the last act, could be paralleled by originality in character creation, he might make of this thriller a play of distinction and roundness comparable with nhe work, in the crime department, of Dorothy Sayers."

Smith's Weekly said "Mr. A.'s thriller calls for certain long periods of suffering on the part of the spectators. These bouts, which rather resemble rigor mortis, set in at the beginnings of acts 1, 2, and 3, endure for great lengths of time, and cease abruptly some ten minutes before each curtain — when "Mr. A. springs his spooky little act-endings in time to arouse you for the intervals."

Variety said the play "has little chance abroad. Needs plenty of re-write to smooth it out for even local consumption... Action is slow. and never builds."

The play later toured English provinces starring Ellen Pollock and Ernest Milton. Afford went to England to be involved in its production. The play did not transfer to the West End but had two different runs in 1950.

== Original cast ==
- Neva Carr Glyn
- Betty Duncan
- Gordon Glenwright
- Richard Parry
- Georgie Sterling
- Grant Taylor
- Maurice Unicomb
- Daphne Winslow
- Charles Zoli

== Adaptations ==
Dark Enchantment was adapted for radio on the ABC in 1960. The adaptation was by Joy Hollyer.

== Sleep No More ==
Sleep No More
- Original language: English
- Written by: Max Afford
- Genre: suspense

Premiere
- Date: 18 June 1943
- Place: Independent Theatre, Sydney
- Directed by: Leonard Bullen

The play appears to be based on Sleep No More, an earlier play of Afford's . This play was set in a London boarding-house for theatrical types; a Rumanian ventriloquist, a student of Black Magic, bequeaths his doll to his wife, there are accidents and the wife suspects the doll is responsible.

The play was given a reading at the Independent Theatre in 1940. However it was not produced until 1943. The Sydney Morning Herald said it "lacks a good deal of the dramatic action of the playwright's earlier thriller, Lady in Danger." The Bulletin said the play "lacks most things necessary in a stage thriller, including the thrills. The first act is hopeful; the other two haven’t even hope. All the characters come straight out of stock.... If Afford turned his energy to the Australian scene he’d probably find that his characters and plots would come to life with the background."
