= Thelma Afford =

Australian stage actor and costume designer (1907–1996)

Thelma May Afford
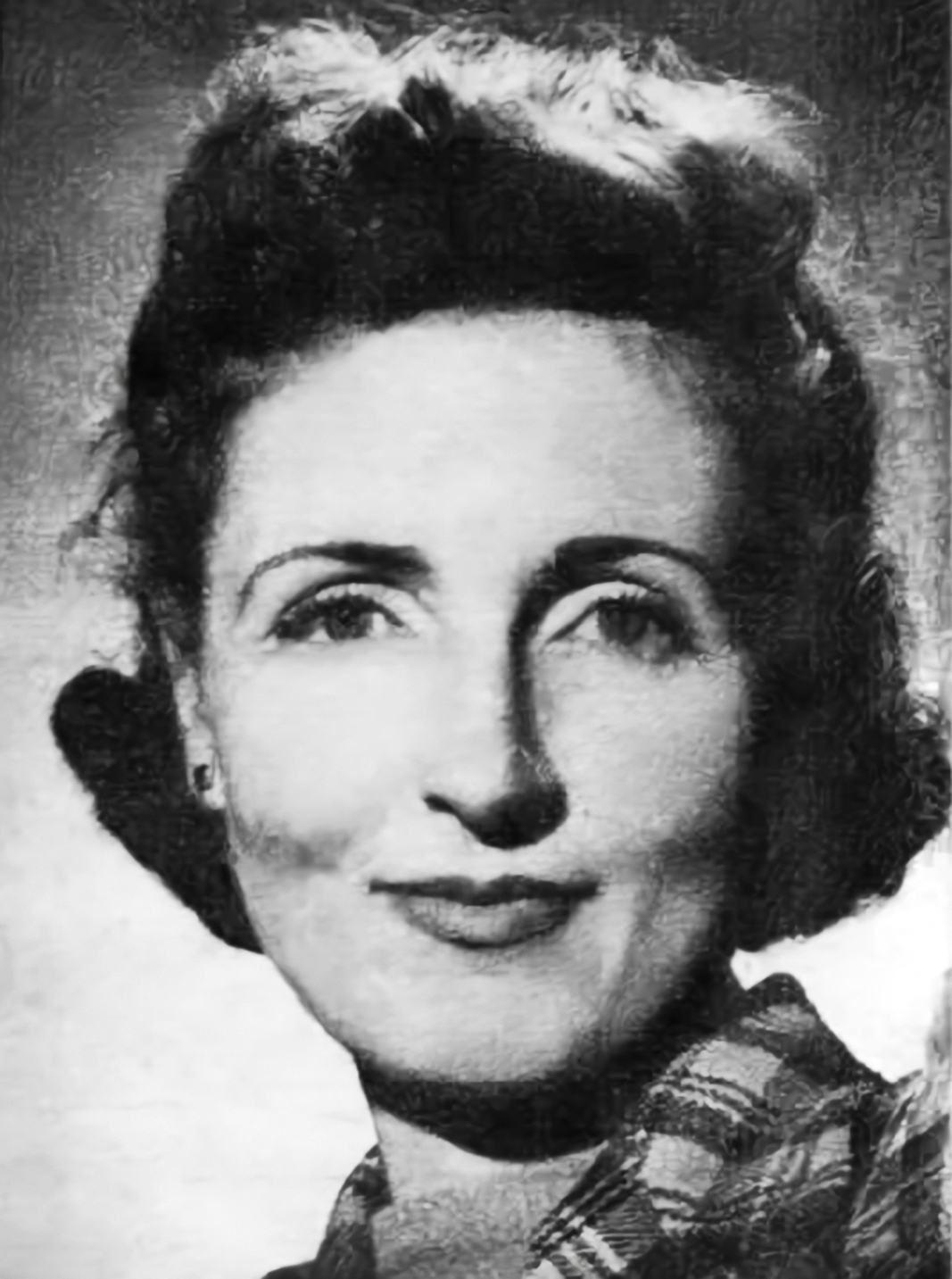
- Thelma Afford in 1947. Photo: Noel Rubie
- Born: Thelma May Thomas; 1 December 1907; Broken Hill, New South Wales, Australia
- Died: 21 August 1996 (aged 88); Sydney, Australia
- Resting place: Northern Suburbs Memorial Gardens and Crematorium North Ryde, Ryde City, New South Wales, Australia
- Education: Presbyterian Girls' College
- Occupation: Designer
- Known for: Costume designer, theatre performer, and fashion journalist
- Spouse: Max Afford

Thelma May Afford (née Thomas; 1 December 1907 – 21 August 1996) was an Australian costume designer, theatre performer, and fashion journalist who worked in Adelaide, Melbourne, and Sydney.

Max and Thelma, circa 1950

== Early years ==
Afford was born Thelma Thomas in Broken Hill, New South Wales to William James Thomas and Ethel (née Henderson) in 1907. Her parents moved to Adelaide, where she attended the Presbyterian Girls' College, Glen Osmond. There she studied drawing and design, and became an art teacher at the South Australian School of Arts and Crafts. She acted between 1932 and 1934, then moved to Melbourne in 1934 to further study at Technical College.

== Marriage to Max Afford ==
Max Afford and Thelma met when she was designing the costumes for his play Colonel Light: The Founder at the Tivoli, Adelaide. The play won awards in competitions run by the Australian Broadcasting Commission which in 1937 employed him in Sydney as a writer, and the following year Thelma was also called to Sydney, to design the costumes for that city's sesqui-centenary pageant. They married on 16 April 1938 at St Michael's church, Vaucluse, Sydney, and lived most of their married life in a flat near Balmoral beach. They had no children. Leslie Rees, a close friend of the Affords, described their marriage: "Between husband and wife, there was the deepest and most tender affinity in all matters and on all levels."

== Professional life ==
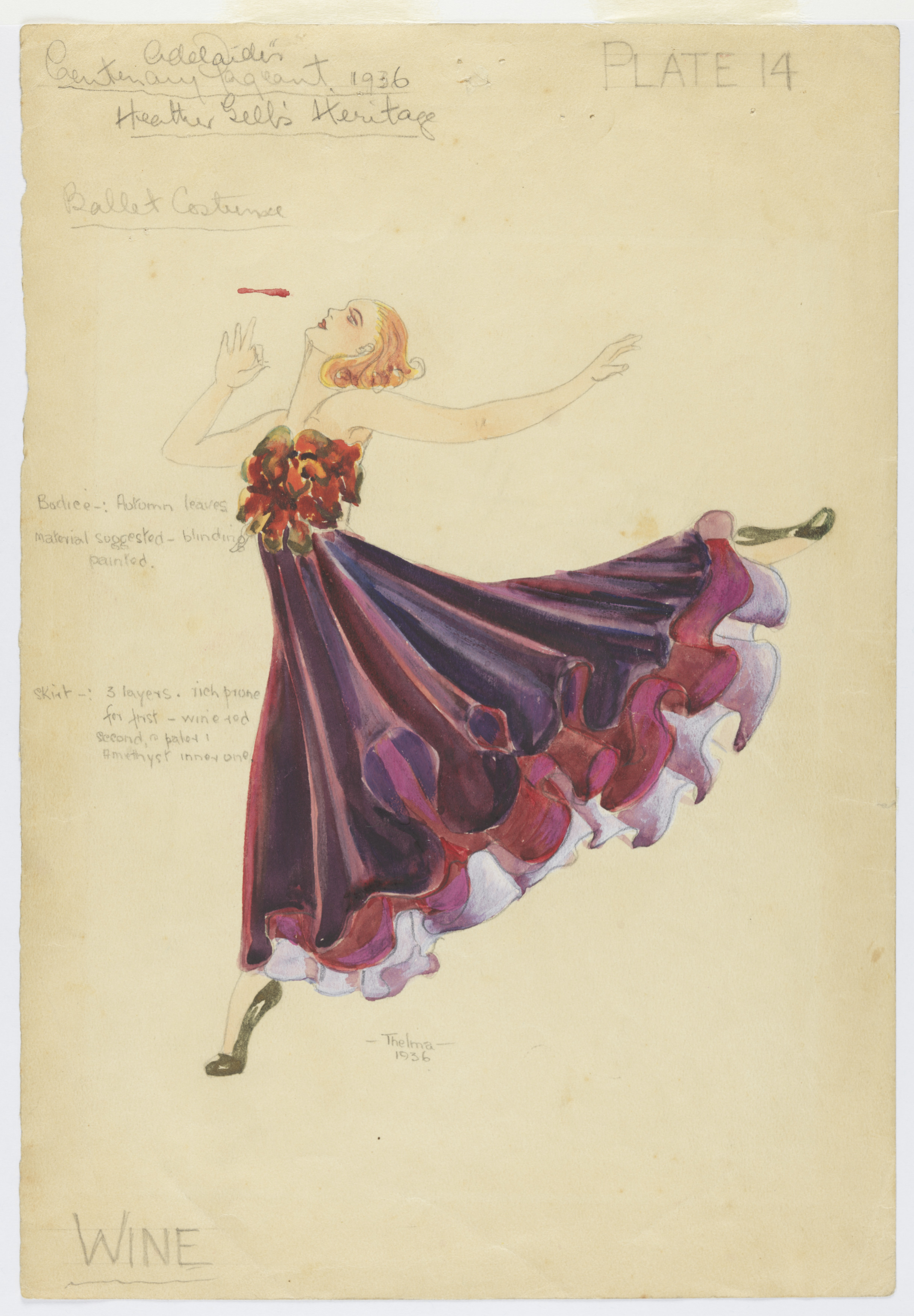
Ballet costume for Adelaide's Centenary Pageant, 1936, original watercolour by Thelma Thomas

=== Actress ===
In the early 1930s, Thelma Thomas was an actress in Adelaide, collaborating notably with the Ab-Intra Studio Theatre for Woman Song, The Robe of Yama, The Stained-Glass Window, and The Aspen Tree in 1932. In 1935, Thelma joined the Ab-Intra for their last show Archway Motif before the theatre closed indefinitely.

=== Designer ===
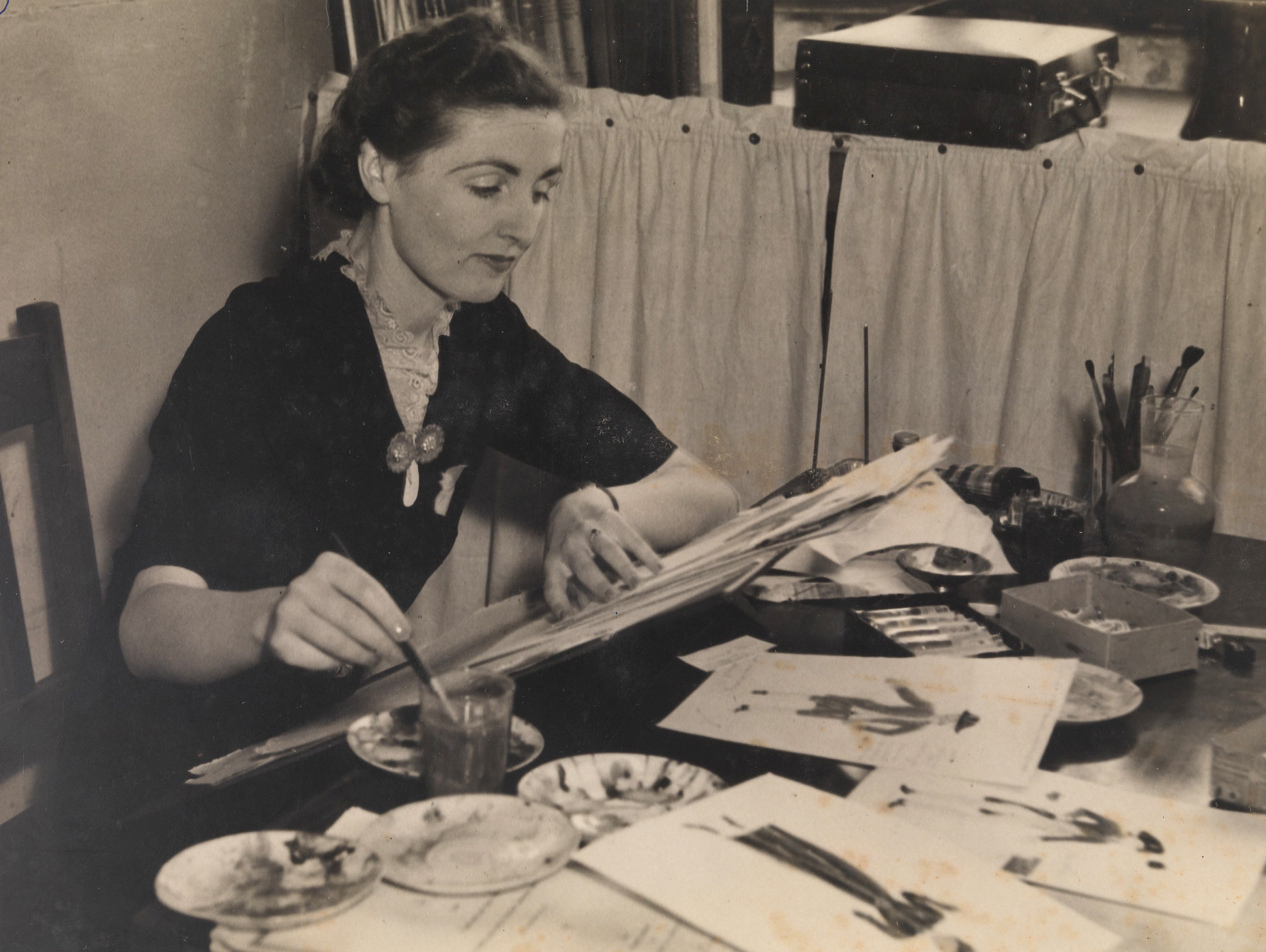
Afford working on Sydney's Sesquicentenary "March to Nationhood", 1938

Thelma started designing theatre costumes in the early 1930s at the Ab-Intra Studio Theatre founded during the Depression by Alan Harkness and Kester Baruch, and also at the Adelaide Repertory Theatre, where she worked with Agnes Dobson and Robert Helpmann.

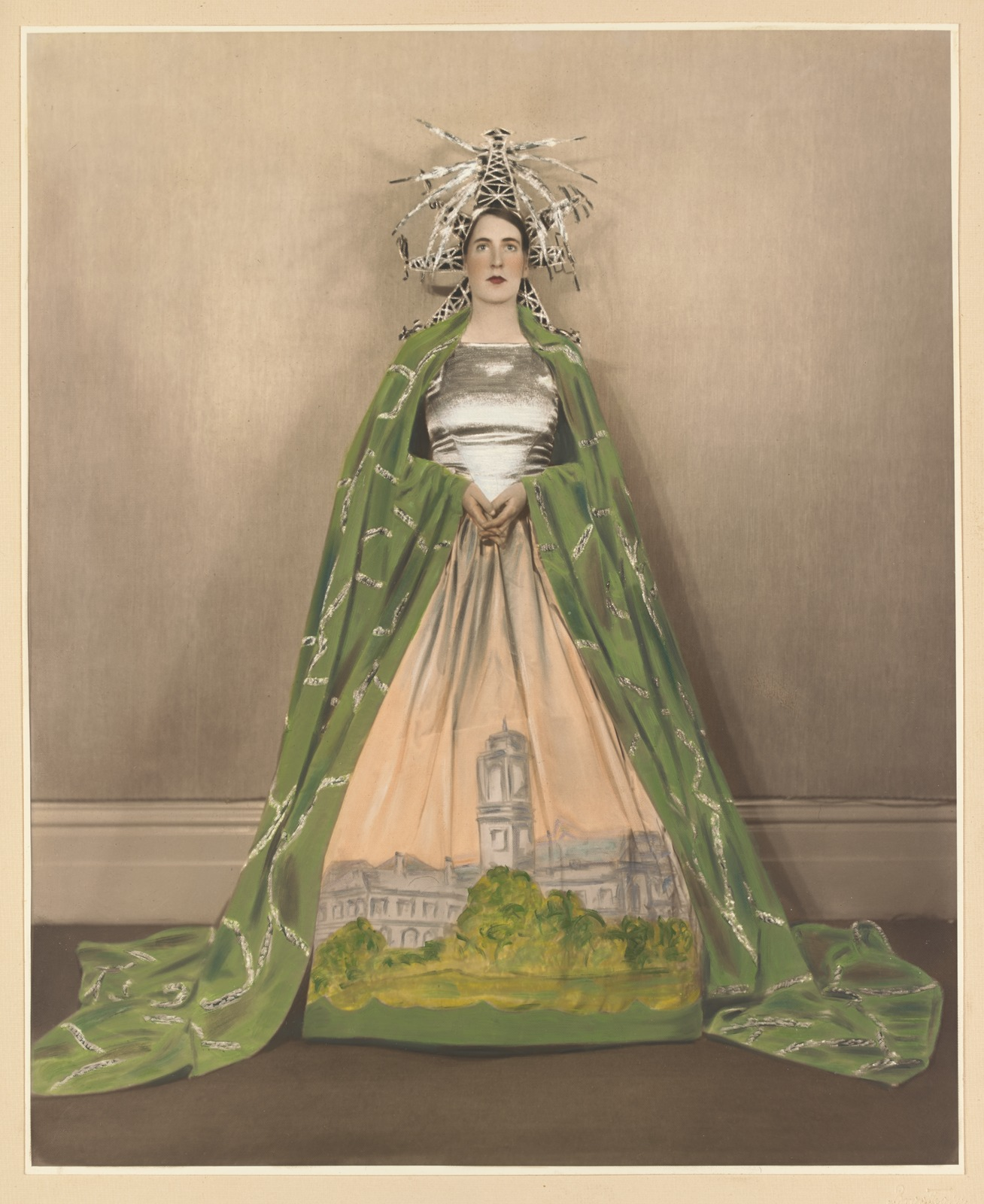
Jessie Deakin Brookes as the State of Victoria including a headpiece modelled on the Yallourn power station transmission tower

In 1934, she was commissioned to design for the Melbourne centenary pageant. Only one of her costumes for the Pageant of Nations is known to survive and is the embodiment of the State of Victoria, worn by Jessie Deakin Brookes, (a social worker and grand daughter of Alfred Deakin, second Prime Minister of Australia), who donated it to the State Library Victoria in 1998. It featured three iconic Melbourne buildings, Government House, the town hall and Flinders Street railway station, the Murray Darling river and irrigation system and a headpiece modelled on the Yallourn power station transmission tower. It was the inspiration of the exhibition Velvet, Iron, Ashes displayed at the State Library in Victoria in 2019–2020.

Thomas then worked, prior to her marriage, on South Australia's centenary celebrations in 1936. She enjoyed costume designing on a large scale, and added that "period costumes give a designer more scope than modern clothes".

She was resident designer at the Minerva Theatre from 1940 to 1950 and designed most of the costumes for husband Max's plays, including Awake My Love (a rewrite of his earlier Colonel Light play), and those of other playwrights including Sam Speewack, for the Independent Theatre through the 1950s. She also worked for the Garrick Theatre and the Tivoli Theatre in Melbourne. Also in 1957 she designed the costumes for Cinderella, the pantomime at the Elizabethan Theatre, praised for "its handsome costumes" and described as "Cinderella done in French 18th century style".

=== Cinema ===
For cinema, she was costume designer at Cinesound for Cecil Kellaway's 1939 film Mr. Chedworth Steps Out, and in 1947, she designed period costumes for Charles Chauvel's Sons of Matthew, and Cobb and Co. She also collaborated with Cinesound Productions.

=== Television ===
Thelma worked with the Australian Broadcasting Commission costume design for live drama on television, including the ABC's first, J.M.Barrie's The Twelve-Pound Look in 1956, Oscar Wilde's Importance of Being Earnest, broadcast 18 December 1957 on ABN-2, Ending It, Pride and Prejudice, Three-cornered Moon, and A Phoenix Too Frequent. She remarked that costumes for TV were different than for the stage since the focus was on the upper-body of the actors instead of the silhouette, and the filming was in black-and-white, more precisely 9 shades of grey.

=== Journalist ===
Afford authored articles in drama journals, newspapers, and a posthumously published a book titled Dreamers and Visionaries on the little theatres in Adelaide in the first half of the 20th century.

=== Teacher ===
Thelma Afford worked as an art teacher in the late 1920s and early 1930s, then again towards the end of her career from 1955 to 1978 at Queenwood School for Girls in Mosman where she was Senior Art mistress.

== Death and legacy ==
After Max's sudden death at 48 in 1954, Thelma remained in Sydney where she lived until her death in 1996.

At her death, Thelma left instructions to establish a fund with The Trust company for the attribution of an annual $10,000 "Max Afford Playwrights' Award" and a $7,500 "Thelma Afford Theatre, Stage, TV or Film Costume Design Award".

Her designs are collected in the State Library of South Australia, the State Library of New South Wales and the Fryer Library at the University of Queensland.

=== Professional associates ===
- George Bell
- Kester Berwick
- Charles Chauvel
- Elsa Chauvel
- Agnes Dobson
- Doris Fitton
- Pierre Fornari
- Ken G. Hall
- Alan Harkness
- Robert Helpmann
- J.C. Williamson

== Publications ==
- Afford, Thelma (2004). Dreamers and Visionaries: Adelaide's Little Theatres from the 1920s to the early 1940s (1st ed.). Sydney: Currency Press. ISBN 9780868197500.
- Afford, Thelma (1988). "Ab-Intra Studio Theatre in Adelaide 1931–35". Australasian Drama Studies (12/13). Department of English, La Trobe University: 167–180.

== Bibliography ==
- Thelma Afford's designs for stage and television. Papers of Max and Thelma Afford, 1912–1987, UQFL184, Album 3, Fryer Library, University of Queensland Library.
- Ritchie, J. "Max Afford", Australian Dictionary of Biography, vol.13. Melbourne, 2002.
- "Awake my Love by Max Afford", Drama and the School issue 21. Sydney, NSW: C. Felton, 1960.

== Archives ==
- State Library of New South Wales. Portfolio of 216 original watercolour sketches by Thelma Afford, 11 with fabric samples. Includes 32 black and white and sepia photographs of finished designs. PX*D 330/ff.1-253.
- State Library of New South Wales. Thelma Afford - papers, 1931–1995. MLMSS 7769.
- State Library of New South Wales. Thelma Afford further papers, 1937–1972. MLMSS 8408.
- National Library of Australia. Oral history, Thelma Afford interviewed by Hazel de Berg recorded in 1981.
- National Library of Australia. Oral history, Thelma Afford interviewed by Hazel de Berg recorded in 1982.
