= Fly By Night (radio serial) =

1936 Australian radio drama

- Genre: serial drama
- Running time: 20 mins (7:40 pm – 8:00 pm)
- Country of origin: Australia
- Language: English
- Syndicates: ABC
- Written by: Max Afford
- Directed by: Charles Wheeler
- Original release: 14 April 1937
- No. of series: 1
- No. of episodes: 14

Fly By Night is a 1937 Australian radio serial by Max Afford. It was his first radio serial featuring Afford's detective hero, Jeffrey Blackburn. In this serial he was not married to Elizabeth but they would be married for subsequent serials.

The play was published in book form in 1942 under the titles Fly By Night and Owl of Darkness.

One critic wrote "by my stop-watch, averages a new knife thrown, pistol shot, warning received, or document stolen every minute.. it is VERY swift and forceful; but why Scotland Yard? Why not give Sydney’s C.I.D. a chance? "

The production was very successful, selling to the BBC in England, as well as South Africa and New Zealand, and leading to several more Jeffrey Blackburn adventures.

Afford had written some Jeffrey Blackburn novels in which he was single. This was his first radio serial. He introduced the character of Elizabeth, who Jeffrey married at the end of Fly By Night. When Afford was commissioned to write a second Blackburn serial he decided to keep Jeffrey married.

== Cast ==
- James Raglan as Jeffrey Blackburn
- Hilda Scurr as Elizabeth
- Vivian Edwards as Chief Inspector Read
- Max Osbiston as Edward Blaine
- John Weston as Robert Ashton
- Ben Lewin as Sir Anthony Atherton-Wayne

== Episode ==
- Ep One "Formula Number Four" (14 April)
- Ep Two "Design for Death" (21 April)
- Ep Three "The Gentleman from Buenos Aires" (28 April)
- Ep Four "Mixed Doubles" (5 May)
- Ep Five "The Highest Bidder" (19 May)
- Ep Six "Ashton Learns the Truth" (26 May)
- Ep Seven "Black and White Evidence" (2 June)
- Ep Eight "The Intriguing Mr Todhunter" (4 June)
- Ep Nine "Terror By Night" (11 June)
- Ep Ten - "The Secret of the Vault" (23 June)
- Ep Eleven "Ashes to Ashes" (30 June)
- Ep Twelve "Find the Woman" (7 July)
- Ep Thirteen "The Owl Unmasked" (14 July)
- Final ep "The Owl Unmasked" (21 July)
