= It Walks by Night =

- Wireless Weekly 4 Jan 1941
- Genre: serial drama
- Country of origin: Australia
- Language: English
- Syndicates: ABC
- Written by: Max Afford
- Directed by: John Cairns
- Original release: 6 January – 24 March 1941
- No. of series: 12

It Walks by Night is an Australian radio serial by Max Afford featuring his detective hero, Jeffrey Blackburn.

("It Walks by Night" was also the title of an episode of another Blackburn serial, Grey face.)

Mary McGregor and Douglas Kelly played the lead roles of Elizabeth and Jeffrey Blackburn. This new casting upset some listeners who were used to hearing Peter Finch and Neva Carr Glynn in the roles.

The serial was being played again in 1954 when Afford died.

== Select episodes ==
- Episode One (6 January 1941) - Strange Ghost at Wolford Hall
- Episode Two (13 January 1941) - The Second Victim
- Episode Three (20 January 1941) - The Unexpected Victim
- Episode Four (27 January 1941) - The Guest Whom Nobody Saw
- Episode Five (3 February 1941) - Inspector Read Takes Over
- Episode Six (10 February 1941) - The Puzzle from the Past
- Episode Seven (17 February 1941) - Blood on the Moon
- Episode Eight(24 February 1941) - Peril on the Plain
- Episode Nine (3 March 1941)
- Episode Ten (10 March 1941) - The Most Dangerous Game
- Episode Eleven (17 March (1941) - The Closing of the Net
- Episode Twelve (24 March 1941) - Which One?
