= A Woman Called Ruth =

1936 Australian radio play

- Wireless Weekly 3 July 1936
- Genre: drama play
- Running time: 30 mins
- Country of origin: Australia
- Language: English
- Home station: 5CL
- Written by: Max Afford
- Directed by: Max Afford
- Recording studio: Adelaide
- Original release: July 9, 1936

A Woman Called Ruth is a 1936 Australian radio play by Max Afford set on a farm on the South African coast.

The play placed in the 1936 ABC Radio Playwriting Competition, which had been won by Afford for his play Merry-Go-Round.

It was picked up for broadcast over the national network (the Australian Broadcasting Corporation).
