= The Dead are Blind =

1937 novel by Max Afford

- Author: Max Afford
- Language: English
- Series: Jeffrey Blackburn
- Genre: detective
- Publisher: John Long
- Publication date: 1937
- Publication place: Australia

The Dead are Blind is a 1937 Australian novel by Max Afford featuring his hero Jeffrey Blackburn. It was the third Jeffrey Blackburn novel.

Afford wrote the book in two months. As with the first two Afford novels, Dead are Blind was published in London before Australia. It was the third novel under a three-book contract Afford had with John Long.

By 1940 it had sold 52,000 copies. A reviewer called it "a readable mystery."

== Premise ==
"When the Chief Inspector was invited into the sacred portals of the B.B.C. to witness a radio play, he was delighted. But when the leading actress collapsed, seemingly with heart failure, he found that chance had led his steps into one of the most intriguing and bewildering crime cases of the year."
