= Mischief in the Air =

Play written by Malcolm Afford

- Original language: English
- Written by: Max Afford
- Genre: Comedy thriller
- Setting: Sydney

Premiere
- Date: 27 July 1944
- Place: Theatre Royal, Sydney

Mischief in the Air is a comedy mystery play from Max Afford. The story takes place in a radio station.

It was one of the few Australian plays of the 1940s to receive a professional production, being produced by J.C. Williamsons Ltd. They produced it in association with radio station 2GB and production company Macquarie, who presented a radio version.

== Plot ==
The action takes place in a Rex Broadcasting Studios, a station owned by Larry Carlson, a former Australian soldier, and Clay Tuttle, an American serviceman. Larry manages the business while Clay writes scripts. Larry is engaged to Fern, a doctor. Larry and Clay need the interest of sponsors Mc McGuinness, a Scotsman and Mr Mandelberg, a Jewish new Australian, but problems arise when the former falls dead. Fern figures out it was due to poison.

Other characters include novelist Mrs Van Leydon, studio supervisor Arnold Vickery, actor Clarence Parsons and his wife Muriel. Fern, Larry and Clay decide to hide McGuinness' corpse until Mandelberg signs the deal. But it turns out the dead person isn't McGuinness. It's McGuinness' brother a Commonwealth Investigations officer investigating foreign spies working at Woomera and broadcasting in code. The trio decide to solve the case themselves.

While they are figuring out who poisoned Charles McGuinness (the killer used poisoned darks bought by Van Leydon a New Guinea expert), the real McGuiness wants to arrive. Mandleberg loses his diamond ring. They think the agent is Vickery. Fern persuades Mandleberg to sign the contract. Then Charles McGunnis comes back to life. He was paralysed. They realise Vicket is innocent (Fern tells them they read the note in his pocket wrongly).

Fern, who becomes the lead, realises the killer is Van Leydon - she used a lipstick device as a blow pipe. Van Leydon is about to kill Fern but is disrupted by a murder mystery play that is on.

== Production history ==
SMH 25 July 1944 ad

Reading a copy of the script, Sydney Morning Herald drama critic called it:

A much more closely knit comedy-mystery than "Lady in Danger"... Many of the comedy's lines especially those of a pungent witted American are happily turned and topical... Mr. Afford makes no pretence of being a deep-dyed dramatist, his purpose is to write plays to entertain, plays in which resourcefulness of the plot has precedence over subtleties of character and problem. His writing is dexterous, even though his characterisation is patently superficial. He prefers to be temporarily diverting rather than to bother about the overtoned which make for lasting drama: but in his chosen sphere he is an able and admirable craftsman.

The play debuted in 1944 under the direction of John Alden with the cast including a young John McCallum. It was given a five week time limit. The same Herald critic reviewed the production saying:

Afford is clearly over-sworn to intricacies of plot many of them neat and engaging rather than to plausibility of psychology In his characters. Mr. Afford makes the mistake of continuing his story too long after the real denouement so that there is complete antl-climax and no real "capping" at his final curtain. While the craftsmanship with which he has built up his suspense and a couple of most entertaining "red herrings" is admirable, it is also plain that the intricacy of his plotting has not left a great deal of theatre art to producer or cast.

The Daily Telegraph called it "an ingenious, plausible tale, with smart, up-to-the-minute dialogue, suspense, continual surprise; a moment of horror."

Leslie Rees later wrote "Afford’s exuberant delight in ways of killing again had scope, and there was also some good character-writing—the Jewish sponsor, for instance—and quick-answering lines, though these merits hardly compensated for an invertebrate plot."

== Original cast ==
- Aileen Britton
- Edwin Finn
- Edward Howell
- John McCallum
- John O'Malley

== 1944 radio version ==
The same cast as the theatre version appeared in a radio version of the play that aired in 1944.

The play was subsequently given a number of amateur productions.
