= The Clock Strikes Twelve (radio play) =

1930 Australian radio play by Max Afford

- Genre: drama play
- Running time: 28 mins (9:02 pm – 9:30 pm)
- Country of origin: Australia
- Language: English
- Home station: 5CL
- Starring: The 5CL Radio Players
- Written by: Max Afford
- Directed by: Max Afford
- Recording studio: Adelaide
- Original release: December 29, 1930

The Clock Strikes Twelve is a 1930 Australian radio play by Max Afford.

It was one of Afford's first radio plays and one of his few thrillers set in Australia. It confirmed his growing reputation in radio in Adelaide.

== Premise ==
"The play is set in a lonely house on the storm-swept rocks near Willunga, and concerns the Christmas adventure of Doctor Michael Orme, his young wife, Barbara, and a younger singer in love with her. A few nights before Christmas, the trio is gathered in the drawing room. Suddently as they talk the clock strikeks twelve, the lights go out and terror stalks into the room. When the lights return, one of the party is missing. Who is it and what happens?"
