= A Cat Across Their Path =

1939 Australian radio play by Max Afford

- Genre: drama play
- Running time: 60 mins (8:30 pm – 9:30 pm)
- Country of origin: Australia
- Language: English
- Written by: Max Afford
- Original release: December 6, 1939

A Cat Across Their Path is a 1939 Australian radio play by Max Afford.

The play was about Monica Sefton, who was the lead character in Afford's later Lady in Danger. Many other aspects of that play appear in A Cat Across Their Path including a cat and Monica's husband.

The play was produced for radio again in 1940 and 1951.

Reviewing the 1939 production, Wireless Weekly said the play was "disappointing. This crime drama fades out in a bloom of tenderness which is uncalled for and rather hard to bear... it is rather less plausible than usual, and lapses periodically into domestic moments which interrupt the story without diverting the listener from its obvious weaknesses."

== Premise ==
"A swift-moving laughter-play about a young lady whose habit of claiming false acquaintance with the famous and the notorious finds her mixed up in a sensational murder case."
