= Willunga High School =

Location
- 239 Main Road; Willunga SA 5172; Australia; 35°16′S 138°33′E

Information
- Type: Public school
- Motto: On The Wave Of Success
- Established: 1960
- Principal: Anthony Van Ruiten
- Staff: 101
- Grades: 7–13
- Enrollment: 935
- Campus size: 17 ha (42 acres)
- Colors: Dark navy and white
- Mascot: Stumpy (female maned duck)
- Website: www.whs.sa.edu.au

Willunga High School is a government high school in the town of Willunga, South Australia, located about 47 km (29 mi) south of the Adelaide city centre.

== Notable alumni ==
- Pru Goward, former politician
- Harold Thomas, the designer of the Australian Aboriginal flag
- Jona Weinhofen, musician
- Ryan Scott, wheelchair rugby player
