= Lady in Danger (stage play) =

1942 play by Max Afford and 1959 television film directed by Colin Dean

- Playbill cover 1945 production
- Written by: Max Afford; Alexander Kirkland (US version)
- Original language: English
- Genre: comedy-mystery
- Setting: London

Premiere
- Date premiered: 28 February 1942
- Place premiered: Independent Theatre, Sydney

Lady in Danger was a play by Australian writer Max Afford. It was one of the few Australian plays to be produced on Broadway. It was also adapted for radio and television.

Filmink called it "one of those actor-proof plays ready made for amateurs and would be a fun night at the theatre if the ticket prices weren’t too high."

== Plot ==
Monica Sefton is the wife of a sacked reporter, Bill. She plans to write a thriller to restore the family fortune. She accidentally stumbles upon a Nazi spy ring.

== Characters ==
- Bill Seflton, a journalist
- Monica, his wife (also a writer)
- Mrs Idamae Lambrey their landlady
- Dr Gilbert Norton, a neighbour
- Sylvia Meade, hat and gloves
- Andrew Meade, thin, untidy man in his mid-thirties, fellow journalist to Bill
- Detective Dennis Marsh
- Constable Pogson
- Chief Inspector William Burke
- Corpse, non-acting
- Cat (soft toy)

== 1942 amateur production ==
SMH ad 14 Mar 1942

The play was first produced by Doris Fitton at the Independent Theatre in Sydney in early 1942 starring Gwen Plumb. (Although the character of Monica Sefton had appeared in Afford's earlier radio play A Cat Across Their Path.)

The Sydney Morning Herald said "Well written and full of dramatic surprise the play deserves the attention of the professional theatre."

Wireless Weekly said "Mr Afford uses stock material, but with skill and sure-fire effect. Everything is nicely explained, and the action, after a longish start, runs true and smooth to an exciting final scene. Dialogue is studded with wisecracks, ranging from the feeble to the inspired. Too many seemed artificially introduced. However, I consider that it is not the function of little theatres to present murder mysteries. Our professional theatre seems intent on supplying all the demand this... Nevertheless, it is pleasing to see an Australian playwright win success in a highly competitive field."

== 1944 professional production ==
SMH ad 29 March 1944

The play was seen by representatives of J.C. Williamsons Ltd, the leading theatrical producers in the country, who bought the rights. Since Williamsons had not produced an Australian play in over 20 years (the previous one was The Flaw) this was seen as a positive step for Australian playwriting.

Afford said “The season at the Independent, gave me an opportunity to improve any weaknesses. Naturally, the professional production will be a more elaborate one particularly in the last act, which requires sliding panels and secret passages.”

The play made its professional debut on 15 March 1944 at the Theatre Royal in Sydney and was positively received.

The Bulletin said "it is hard to become elated over a completely unsophisticated Fifth Column melodrama set in London... Surely, in a country which has offered such items as the Shark Arm and Pyjama Girl mysteries, Mr. Afford has no need to go to London for his material."

The play was performed in Newcastle.

The play was published in 1944 by Mulga. Leslie Rees later observed:

The author succeeded in making you like his young couple as well as believe in them; and when the sticky web closed round Monica, you shared their shock, amazement, and fear. In other words, the play was not merely a piece of pattern-making, ingenious, logical, unexpected and knit into current events and dangers, but it also had human quality. The mechanics were concealed beneath back-chat and a variety of character imprints, each figure seeming to be there in his own right of contributing entertainer.

== 1945 Broadway production ==
Ad in Detroit Free Press 18 Mar 1945

The play was also optioned for production on Broadway, although it was rewritten by Alexander Kirkland to be set in Melbourne, Australia and be about a Japanese spy ring. The character of Bill Sefton was changed to an American soldier who was stationed in Melbourne, and his wife Monica now grew up in Japan, not Germany. The other characters played Australians. Kirkland finished his new draft by September 1944. Robert Cummings and Jane Wyman were announced as possible stars.

The play was produced by Dan Fisher and Pat Allen. Lady in Danger premiered in Detroit in March 1945. Variety, reviewing the show in Detroit, declared "it seems sure to make the grade here and on Broadway...should register highly with the mystery contingent among theatregoers."

The play then moved to New York and opened 29 March.

=== Cast ===
- Ronald Alexander as Detective Dennis Marsh
- Gary Blivers as Frederick Smith
- Helen Claire as Monica Sefton
- Vicki Cummings as Sylvia Meade
- Clarence Derwent as Chief Inspector Burke
- Elfrida Derwent as Miss Hodges
- Paul Fairleigh as Karl Kurt
- Hudson Faussett as Constable Pogson

=== Response ===
Reviews were not strong and the play closed after twelve performances.

The New York Times wrote "Seldom have so many words found their way to a single melodrama, seldom so little action, seldom have actors carried on so hopelessly, like dogs baying wistfully at the moon. Most of the time the lady’s chief danger was that the audience might break into macabre laughter."

The Cincinnati Enquirer wrote "there is not the tiniest suspicion of comedy throughout and the only mystery about the entire sorry affair is how in the name of things theatrical it was produced in the first place." Walter Winchell declared the play "had better have stayed down under."

The Daily News called it "a tepid chiller."

Variety wrote "those Detroit critics indulged in wishful thinking when they pegged Lady in Danger a good thing, which it isn't. At least they inspired false hope within a couple of young, aspiring managers... Australian import is wrongly billed as a comedy-mystery, for there is nothing to laugh at in the story of Japanazi doings in Melbourne."

"That's not too good, is it?" said Afford. "Still, I don't suppose you can hit the jackpot every time."

== 1955 radio adaptation ==
The play was adapted for radio on the ABC in 1955.

== 1959 television version ==
The play was adapted for Australian television in 1959.
