= Grey Face =

1940 Australian radio drama

- Wireless Weekly 11 May 1940
- Genre: serial drama
- Running time: 30 mins (8:00 pm – 8:30 pm)
- Country of origin: Australia
- Language: English
- Syndicates: ABC
- Starring: Peter Finch
- Written by: Max Afford
- Original release: 13 May 1940 – 1940
- No. of series: 1
- No. of episodes: 12

Grey Face is a 1940 Australian radio serial by Max Afford featuring his detective hero, Jeffrey Blackburn.

It starred Peter Finch and Neva Carr Glynn, reprising their roles from The Mysterious Mr. Lynch.

The serial was very popular and was recorded again by the ABC in 1950 starring Nigel Lovell and directed by Frank Harvey.

== Premise ==
"It's about the alleged murderous propensities of an Egyptian mummy in a lonely house on the Cornish moors, with Afford sleuth Geoffrey Blackburn pursuing the clues."

== Episodes ==
- Ep 1 (13 May) "The Limping Feet"
- Ep 2 - "The Mission in Half Moon Street"
