= Max Afford =

Australian playwright and novelist (1906–1954)

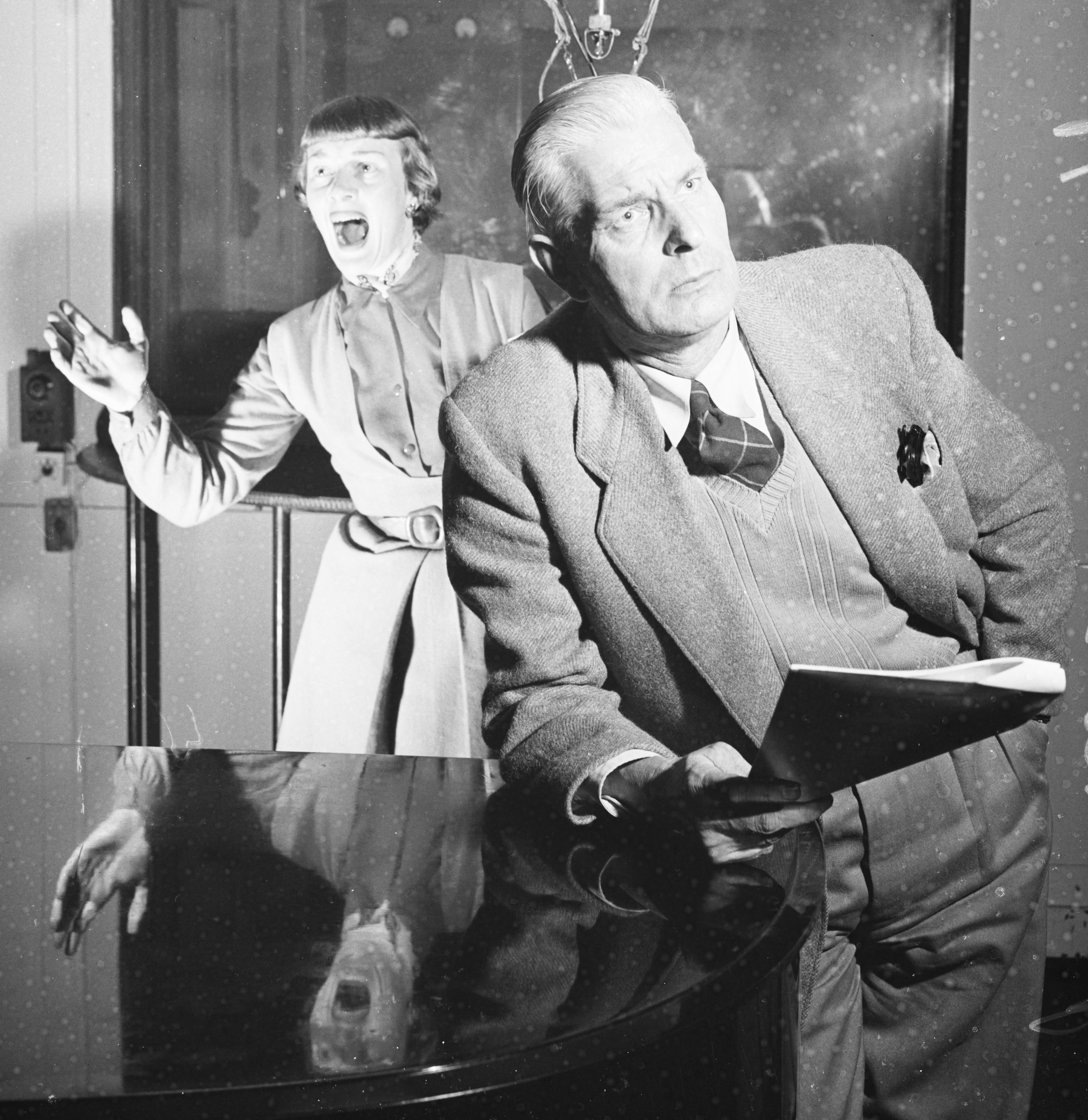
- Max Afford, Sydney, February 1954
- Born: Malcolm R. Afford; 8 April 1906; Adelaide, South Australia
- Died: 2 November 1954 (aged 48); Sydney, Australia
- Occupations: Playwright, novelist
- Spouse: Thelma Afford

Malcolm R. Afford (8 April 1906 – 2 November 1954), known as Max Afford, was an Australian playwright and novelist. He created the fictional hero Jeffrey Blackburn.

== Biography ==
=== Early years ===
Afford was born in Adelaide, South Australia, the youngest son of Robert D. Afford of "Glenleigh", Stamford street Parkside, an inner suburb. He left school when he was 16, and started writing novels and plays.

=== Personal life ===
After winning the centenary competition in Adelaide, he moved to Sydney in 1936, on contract to the Australian Broadcasting Commission (ABC) as a playwright and producer in the Federal Productions Department.

Max married Thelma Thomas on 16 April 1938 at St Michael's church, Vaucluse, Sydney. Thelma, a costume designer whom he met on the set of Colonel Founder / Awake my Love two years earlier, was originally from Broken Hill, then Adelaide, and had moved to Sydney to design the costumes for the New South Wales sesqui-centenary pageant. Max and Thelma did not have children.

=== Death ===
Afford died of cancer on 2 November 1954 at Mosman, Sydney, and was cremated. Thelma Afford survived him until 1996.

Numerous condolence letters from his friends, colleagues and admirers were sent to his wife from around Australia and from overseas including the US, the UK and Hong Kong. Many are held in the Fryer Library at the University of Queensland and express sadness about his death, admiration for his literary achievement and regret for the great loss to the Australian literary world.

"Max was one of the sweetest, gayest and most endearing people I have ever encountered", Betty Roland wrote. Tom Inglis Moore said, "He was such an attractive person in himself, and he had outstanding gifts. As a writer he was at the top of the profession as a dramatic writer for radio, a first-class craftsman. His stage plays showed that if he had gone on, he would have become an important playwright. I felt that Max had the talent to have gone even further in achievement. He had such a vitality that it is very hard to realize the truth."

Then Chairman of ABC, Sir Richard Boyer, wrote,"Max was not only the most valued contributor to some of the best of our broadcasts, but was held in great respect and affection by all of us in the ABC (Australian Broadcasting Commission)." David Carver, the International Secretary and General Secretary of English PEN expressed gratitude for his contributions to Australian literary life: "The Sydney P.E.N. owed him a great deal for all the hard work and enthusiasm of his years as President." Ernest William Burbridge, Representative of the British Council in Australia, wrote that "(Max) was so devoted to his art, and had such passionate belief in the cause of Drama."

== Professional life ==
=== Beginnings in Adelaide ===
Afford wrote three novels while in his twenties, which were later published in England and America. He worked as a reporter at the News and Mail from 1926 to 1931. His first story was published in Smith's Weekly in 1928. In 1936 he won the Advertiser's centenary play competition with William Light The Founder (later titled Awake My Love). His 'Jeffrey and Elizabeth Blackburn' novels included Blood on His Hands! (London, 1936) and Death's Mannikins (London, 1937). Many were dramatised for radio, variously starring Peter Finch and Neva Carr Glyn, Nigel Lovell and Lyndall Barbour or Peter Finch and Bettie Dickson as the husband-and-wife detective team. Afford wrote eight crime novels, usually employing English settings, and more than sixty radio and stage plays, usually stories of crime involving the sifting of situations that ultimately uncover the perpetrators. He was considered somewhat of a pioneer of the "whodunit" in radio broadcasting. A science fiction story, The Gland Men of the Island, appeared in Wonder Stories in January 1931.

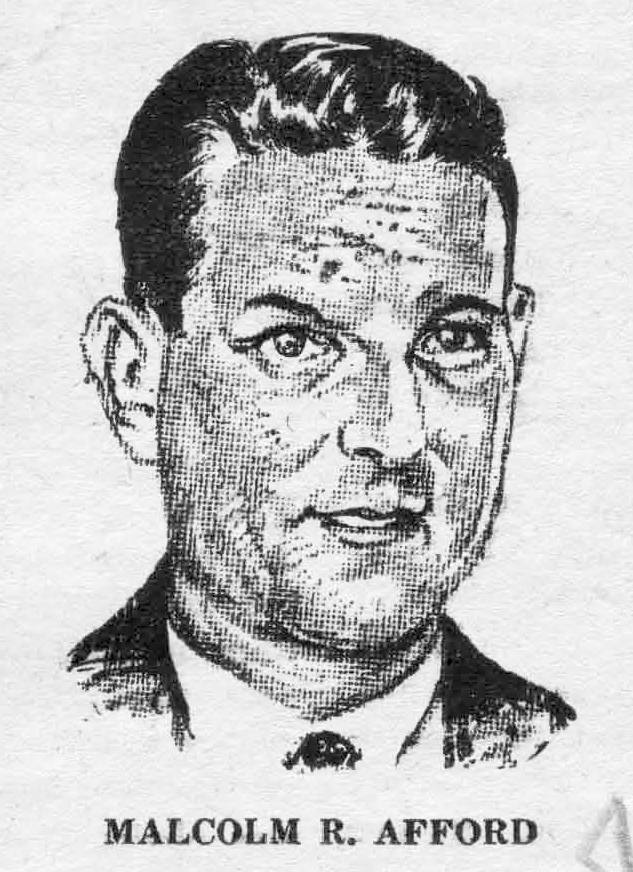
Afford as depicted in Wonder Stories in 1931

=== Career in Sydney ===
Afford was one of the first contract writers to be engaged by the ABC. In 1936, he won three playwriting awards, and was appointed Staff Dramatist by the ABC, with whom he was contracted for six years. During this time he wrote 30 one-and-a-half-hour plays, 15 serials, more than 100 play adaptations, and produced a number of his own plays. From 1941 he wrote children's and adult radio serials including Hagen's Circus (800 episodes) for radio 2GB and 2UE.

In 1942, Afford resigned from the ABC and joined the radio station 2GB, for whom he wrote two long-running commercial serials: First Light Fraser (400 episodes), and Digger Hale's Daughters (208 episodes).

Other radio plays included Lazy in the Sun and Out of This Nettle, and the long-running 1951 A.B.C. serial, Stranger Come In, which explored the subject of immigration.

In 1945, Afford created an all-time record in Australian theatrical history by having two three-act plays presented professionally by the J. C. Williamson theatre company at the Theatre Royal, Sydney. These two plays were Lady in Danger and Mischief in the Air, and were presented within two months of one another – a significant feat, as prior to the production of Lady in Danger, Williamson had not presented a locally written play for 20 years.

Afford's play Lady in Danger (1942), successfully produced at Sydney's Independent Theatre by Doris Fitton, was then staged by J. C. Williamson Ltd and was staged in the US, adapted to American tastes by Jack Kirkland. The Broadway production received poor reviews and closed after 12 performances. He also wrote Mischief in the Air and co-wrote with Ken G. Hall the story for the Columbia Film Corporation's film, Smithy (1946), based on the aviator Sir Charles Kingsford Smith.

Afford was president of the Sydney PEN Club in 1950. His play, Dark Enchantment, toured England's provincial theatres in 1950.

In 1952, Afford signed a contract with the A.B.C. engaging his services as a radio writer for 26 weeks, during which time he was to write five 15-minute installments based on immigration, as a serial on 5 days of the week, twice per day if required.

=== Recognition in Australia ===
- Winner of The Advertiser's centenary play competition, organized to mark the 1936 Adelaide Centenary, for Colonel Light the Founder (later Awake My Love).
- First prize in the ABC's All-Australian Play Competition, in 1936, for Merry Go-Round.
- Equal first prize for libretto of Spruhan Kennedy's Pas de Six in the ABC's Operetta Contest, 1936.
- The Biographical Encyclopedia of the World included Afford in their 1948 edition of Who's Important in Literature.
- His portrait, by Brian Crozier, was (unsuccessfully) entered for the 1951 Archibald Prize.
- At her death, Thelma Afford established a fund for a Max Afford Playwrights' Award.

=== International recognition ===
Afford's radio plays and serials have been re-broadcast in Canada, England, South Africa, New Zealand, Poland, and Egypt. His radio plays have been produced by the Canadian Broadcasting Corporation, as well as by BBC London, by Lux Radio Theatre in South Africa, by the National Broadcasting Service in New Zealand, and also in Cairo.

The BBC, for example, bought his serial Fly By Night and his radio plays Labours of Hercules, Oh, Whistle When You're Happy, The Four Specialists and For Fear of Little Men. Lady in Danger was the second play by an Australian dramatist ever to be performed at a Broadway theatre in front of an American audience.

Consulting Room was broadcast in South Africa in 1954, in both English and Afrikaans, by the Lux Radio Theatre. It is a one-actor serious play about the love between the young couple who try to commit suicide. It Walks By Night was also broadcast in English and Afrikaans. In 1937, the Geneva Conference selected The Four Specialists for translation into Polish to be broadcast by Polskie Radio.

=== Critical reception ===
- Colonel Light the Founder / Awake My Love

The South Australian Tourism Commission said of its presentation during the Adelaide Centenary, 1936: "This play was a great success... completely accurate historically." The Bulletin called it "Dramatic dynamite." Sydney Morning Herald labelled it "a significant milestone for Australian drama." The Sun called it "An outstanding contribution to Australian literature."

- Consulting Room

Lux Radio Theatre, in South Africa, wrote to Afford in 1954 expressing their pleasure at his play Consulting Room, and asked him for more of his radio plays.

- Jeffrey Blackburn serials

The Blackburn serials found such popularity in Australia that 2UE decided to experiment with the structure of radio serials. They changed the typical structure of half an hour once a week, to 12-minute episodes four nights per week, and found listeners preferred not having to wait a whole week for the next instalment.

=== Posthumous publications ===
- Negotiation

In early 1960, Thelma Afford endeavoured to obtain a Commonwealth Literary Fund (CLF) grant to support posthumous publication of a book of Max Afford's stage plays. Tom Inglis Moore, who was in charge of the negotiation of its guarantee, was from 1945 to 1971 a member of the Fund's advisory board. He championed the cause of hundreds of authors and numerous literary journals, and acted as an advocate for left-wing writers in the 1950s. Freddie Howe, head of HarperCollins, proposed the CLF sponsor a collection of three plays and submitted it to W. R. Cumming, Secretary of the CLF, along with the manuscripts. The amount required for guarantee varies from about £80 to £100 for small works up to £500 or more for very large works, while Thelma thought of a guarantee from £200 to £300. Howe was doubtful about publishing the plays since the amount of publishing and preadvertising costs had been far heavier than his expectation. Moore, however, considered it practical and beneficial as CLF had just approved a new scheme of helping publishers with literary, not commercial, books. Collins should not lose out for the publication. Thelma then gave a book of Afford's radio plays to Sam Ure Smith, an Australian arts publisher and promoter, just in case Freddie was disinclined to publish the stage plays. At this stage, Thelma insisted on both volumes (the stage plays and the radio plays produced on the ABC) be published.

In May, Howe agreed to go ahead with a book of stage plays providing he can obtain the Commonwealth of Australia's sponsorship. With this promise, Thelma decided to drop the attempt to publish radio plays with Sam Ure Smith. In June, Collins brought forward this collection of stage plays with two purposes in mind: First, to present a prestige book as a memorial to the late Max Afford, who won outstanding success as both stage and radio dramatist; Second, to make the plays available in published form for the repertory theatres. Howe submitted the proposition to CLF. The proposition is "quite unacceptable", said Tom Inglis Moore, "Lowe's guarantee request of £1114 is far too high and cannot be entertained. The size of the edition is too large at 2,500 and the retail price too high at £35." He recommended altering the proposition either by omitting Dark Enchantment to cut down the volume and the costs and to give a better balance of light and serious plays, or by replacing the collection with a series of single volumes suitable for the repertory societies to perform.

- Outcome

An agreement was finally reached: a volume of only three plays: Lady in Danger, Awake My Love and Consulting Room plus an Introduction from Leslie Rees and a Foreword from Sir Richard Boyer. Thelma as the owner of the copyright waived her royalties, which represented a reduction of £437 on the publishing costs; and a less ambitious edition of only 1400 copies.

== Works ==
=== Stage plays ===
- Honeymoon Hotel, 1930. A musical comedy, produced in Adelaide.
- Lady in Danger (1941)
- Sleep No More
- Mischief in the Air (1944)
- Awake My Love (1947) - Originally called Colonel, or William Light the Founder.
- Dark Enchantment (1949)

=== Novels and short stories ===
- The Gland Men of the Island, Wonder Stories pp. 828–843, January 1931.
- Blood on His Hands!: A Detective Novel. London, England: John Long, 1936. (also published as An Ear For Murder.)
- Death's Mannikins: Being a Sober Account of Certain Diabolical Happenings not Untinged with the Odour of Brimstone which Befell a Respectable Family Living at Exmoor in This Present Year. London, England: John Long, 1937. (also published as Dolls of Death.)
- The Dead are Blind: A Jeffrey Blackburn Adventure. London, England: John Long, 1937.
- Fly By Night: A Jeffrey Blackburn Adventure. London, England: John Long, 1942. Broadcast in seven 30-minute episodes by the BBC in 1939. (Also published as Owl of Darkness NSW Bookstall Co., 1944)
- Sinners in Paradise. Sydney: Frank Johnson, 1946.
- The Sheep and the Wolves. Sydney: Frank Johnson, 1947.
- The Vanishing Trick, Detective Fiction 1.1, December 1948.

=== Radio plays ===
Many of these were revived or rebroadcast years later, possible with a different title. Dates shown are the earliest found (using Trove) under that name.

- The Flail of God, 1931
- Cats Creep at Night 1930
- The Clock Strikes Twelve 1930
- The Waxworks Mystery, (aka. The Wax Museum) 1933 first Australian play to be broadcast nationally
- Old Christmas Shades, 1933
- House To Let, 1934
- The Working Class, 1934
- Black Magic, 1934
- Blackmail, 1934
- The Sin Flood, 1934
- The House of Hangings, 1934
- Front Page Story, 1934
- Sacrifice at Dawn, 1934
- These Old Shades A Christmas romance in one act, 1934
- Avalanche, 1935
- Five Hundred Thousand Witnesses, 1935
- Pit of Darkness, 1935
- Grave Adventure, 1935
- The Almost Perfect Crime, 1935
- War to End War, 1935
- The Legend of the Moonlight, 1935
- When the Doctor Called, 1935
- Awake My Love, 1936 radio adaptation of his stage play
- Merry-Go-Round: A Drama for the Microphone by Outspan, 1936. A six-hour radio play.
- Five Miles Down: Being Another Adventure of Terry, Rob, and Uncle Worthington, 1936.
- A Woman Called Ruth, 1936
- Lord Ingleby Dies, 1936
- The Haunting of Camilla Crane, 1936
- Genesis, 1936 condensed version of Light the Founder
- The Fantastic Case of The Four Specialists, 1937
- Silver from Satan, 1937
- Die for a Lady, 1937
- Whistle When You're Happy, 1938
- For Fear of Little Men, 1938
- The Golden Age, 1938
- All Passion Spent, 1939
- Five White Fingers, 1939
- A Cat Across Their Path, 1939
- Heroisms All Round Us. 1938
- I Am Albert Jones: "A New Radio Play", 1940
- The Queer Affair at Kettering, 1940
- Rose without a Thorn, 1941
- Murder on the Second Floor, 1941
- I Killed the Count, 1941
- It Could Be Natural Death, 1942
- Consulting Room, 1948
- Dark Enchantment, 1949.
- The Franchise Affair, 1954. Aired by the ABC in Sydney.
- Out of This Nettle (n.d.)
- The Sundowners (n.d.)
- Tales of the Supernatural (n.d.)
- Under a Thousand Eyes: A Radio Play of the Vaudeville Theatre (n.d.)
- Out of the Bag (n.d.)
- Lazy in the Sun, aired in 1974.
- Mischief in the Air: Radio and stage Plays. A Comedy-Thriller set in a broadcasting station. St Lucia, Queensland: University of Queensland Press, 1974.

=== Radio serials ===
- The Twelve Labours of Hercules: An Original Adventure Series in Twelve Episodes and a Prologue, 1936
- Chump and Co, 1939
- The Return of Chump and Co, 1940
- The Mysterious Mr. Lynch, 1939–1946
- The Night Watchman (1940)
- First Light Fraser, 1942–1949
- Hagen's Circus, 1941. Ran for 700 odd episodes, broadcast on 2UE, 2CA
- Danger Unlimited, 1941–1949. Ran for 600 odd episodes, broadcast on 2UE
- Digger Hale's Daughters, 1941–1949
- The Eighty Nine Men (1942)
- Stranger Come In: A New Serial Written for Radio, 1951–1954
- Silver Ridge: An Australian Adventure Serial, 1951–1954
- Space Explorers, 1951–1954
- Jeffrey Blackburn series:

- Fly By Night: A Jeffrey Blackburn Adventure 1937
- Grey Face, 1940 broadcast on 2FC and 3AR
- It Walks By Night, 1941
- The Golden Scorpion; A New Jeffrey Blackburn Adventure (n.d.)
- The Blackburns Take Over (n.d.)
- Double Demon: A New Jeffrey Blackburn Adventure, 1941–1949. (a newspaper called it the fifth)
- Murder's Not For Middle Age, 1953– (same newspaper called this the sixth)

- The Mary Jane (1954) – director only

== Sources ==
- Papers of Max and Thelma Afford, 1912–1987, UQFL184, Box 1, Folders 1–4, Fryer Library, University of Queensland Library:
- - "Awake My Love, by Max Afford." Drama and the School, Issue 21, 1960.
- - Letter to Max Afford from Egyptian State Broadcasting. 19 July 1939.
- - Letter to Max Afford from B. H. Richardson, BBC London. 6. December 1944.
- - Letter to Max Afford from S. A. Kaye, Biographical Encyclopedia of the World. 21 October 1946.
- - Letter to Max Afford from S. A. Kaye, Biographical Encyclopedia of the World. 8 September 1947.
- - Letter to Max Afford from W. C. D. Veale, Town Clerk of Adelaide (1948). 14 October 1948.
- - Letter to Max Afford from the Australian Broadcasting Corporation. 26 February 1952.
- - Letter to Max Afford from Lulu Lloyd-Jones, J. Walter Thompson Company Ltd. 8 July 1954.
- - Letter to Max Afford from Lulu Lloyd-Jones, J. Walter Thompson Company Ltd. 26 July 1954.
- - Letter to Max Afford from Roger Pethebridge, J. Walter Thompson Company Ltd. 21 September 1954.
- - Letter to the general manager of the Canadian Broadcasting Corporation, from Max Afford. 4 June 1946.
- - Letter to the South African Broadcasting Corporation, from Max Afford. 17 February 1945.
- - Condolence correspondence to Thelma Afford from Betty Roland. 4 November 1965.
- - Condolence correspondence to Thelma Afford from Tom Inglis Moore. 3 November 1965.
- - Condolence correspondence to Thelma Afford from the Australian Broadcasting Company. 16 November 1965.
- - Condolence correspondence to Thelma Afford from the International P.E.N. Club. 16 November 1965.
- - Condolence correspondence to Thelma Afford from Representative of the British Council in Australia. 4 November 1965.
- - Letter between Thelma Afford and Tom Inglis Moor regarding the Commonwealth Literary Fund's possible Support of a Book of Max Afford's Stage Plays, 1960.
- - Freddie Lowe's Report to the CLF enclosed in the letter to Thelma Afford from Tom Inglis Moore, 15 June 1960.
