= 2026 Italian by-elections =

Italian by-elections

Four by-elections were held in Italy in 2026: two on 22 and 23 March 2026 in Veneto, one on 27 and 28 September 2026 in Calabria and one on 15 and 16 November 2026 in Abruzzo. The elections held in March took place at the same time as the 2026 Italian constitutional referendum.

== List ==
=== Chamber of Deputies ===
==== Veneto 2 – 01 ====
Map of the constituency of Rovigo

A by-election was held in the constituency of Rovigo on 22 and 23 March 2026 to replace a deputy for the seat left vacant by Alberto Stefani (Lega), who was elected President of Veneto Region at the last regional elections held in 2025. The centre-right chose the treasurer of Lega, Alberto Di Rubba, while the centre-left selected Giacomo Bovolenta, secretary of IV for the Province of Rovigo. The local Five Star Movement declared that they would not support a candidate from Renzi's party and withdrew their support from the candidate for this by-election. Lega member Alberto Di Rubba won the election.

2026 Rovigo by-election
Candidate	Party or coalition	Votes	%	+/–
Alberto Di Rubba (Lega)	Centre-right (Note: Endorsed by FdI, Lega, FI, NM, and UdC)	87,269	57.43	−3.16
Giacomo Bovolenta (IV)	Centre-left (Note: Endorsed by PD, AVS, IV, PSI, and +E)	53,045	34.91	+14.19
Giuseppe Padoan	Italy Resists Free	11,654	7.67	New
Total		151,968	100.00	–
Valid votes		151,968	86.34	
Invalid votes		5,990	3.40	
Blank votes		18,050	10.26	
Total votes		176,008	100.00	
Registered voters/turnout		328,603	53.56	−14.84
Centre-right hold				

==== Veneto 2 – 02 ====
Map of the constituency of Selvazzano Dentro

A by-election was held in the constituency of Selvazzano Dentro on 22 and 23 March 2026 to replace a deputy for the seat left vacant by Massimo Bitonci (Lega), who was appointed Regional Assessor for Business and Commerce of the Veneto Region after the last regional elections held in 2025. Lega member Giulio Centenaro won the election.

2026 Selvazzano Dentro by-election
Candidate	Party or coalition	Votes	%	+/–
Giulio Centenaro (Lega)	Centre-right	98,991	59.44	+0.30
Antonino Stivanello (PD)	Centre-left	51,967	31.21	+10.29
Mario Adinolfi	The People of the Family	8,381	5.03	New
Andrea Paccagnella	Ora!	7,191	4.32	New
Total		166,530	100.00	–
Valid votes		166,530	85.95	
Invalid votes		6,297	3.25	
Blank votes		20,934	10.80	
Total votes		193,761	100.00	
Registered voters/turnout		332,183	58.33	−14.93
Centre-right hold				

==== Calabria – 05 ====
Map of the constituency of Reggio Calabria

A by-election was held in the constituency of Reggio Calabria on 27 and 28 September 2026 to replace a deputy for the seat left vacant by Francesco Cannizzaro (Forza Italia), who was elected Mayor of Reggio Calabria after the last local elections held in 2026. Forza Italia member Fabio Roscioli won the election.

2026 Reggio Calabria by-election
Candidate	Party or coalition	Votes	%	+/–
Fabio Roscioli (FI)	Centre-right	38,359	51.02	+3.38
Frank Benedetto (Ind.)	Centre-left (Note: Endorsed by PD, M5S, AVS, IV, PSI, +E, PRC, Pos, PRI, CD and Plus One)	27,511	36.59	+16.3
Domenico Giannetta	National Future	8,226	10.94	New
Francesco Toscano	Sovereign Popular Democracy	1,085	1.44	–0.1
Total		75,181	100.00	–
Valid votes		75,181	97.43	
Invalid votes		1,387	1.80	
Blank votes		596	0.77	
Total votes		77,164	100.00	
Registered voters/turnout		345,486	22.33	–27.07
Centre-right hold				

==== Abruzzo – 01 ====
Map of the constituency of Chieti

A by-election was held in the constituency of Chieti on 15 and 16 November 2026 to replace a deputy for the seat left vacant by Alberto Bagnai (Lega), who was elected as a member of the Italian Competition Authority. Centre-left candidate Luciano D'Amico won the election.

2026 Chieti by-election
Candidate	Party or coalition	Votes	%	+/–
Luciano D'Amico (Ind.)	Centre-left (Note: Endorsed by PD, M5S, AVS, IV, PSI, and PRC)	36,427	57.61	+15.32
Mario Colantonio (Lega)	Centre-right	23,241	36.76	–9.14
Danilo Ranieri	Italy Tomorrow	2,384	3.77	New
Massimo Pasqualone	Dimensione Bandecchi	1,180	1.87	New
Total		63,232	100.00	–
Valid votes		63,232	97.03	
Invalid votes		1,122	1.72	
Blank votes		812	1.25	
Total votes		65,166	100.00	
Registered voters/turnout		382,784	17.02	–45.52
Centre-left gain from Centre-right				

== See also ==
- By-elections in Italy
