= Fabio Roscioli (politician) =

Italian politician and lawyer (born 1966)

Member of the Chamber of Deputies
- Incumbent
- Assumed office 1 October 2026
- Preceded by: Francesco Cannizzaro

Personal details
- Born: 16 March 1966 (age 60) Rome, Italy
- Party: Forza Italia
- Education: Sapienza University of Rome
- Occupation: Lawyer

Fabio Roscioli (born 16 March 1966) is an Italian lawyer and politician of Forza Italia. He has served as a member of the Chamber of Deputies since October 2026.

== Life and career ==
Born in Rome, Roscioli graduated in law from Sapienza University of Rome and worked as a civil lawyer specialising in banking and commercial law. Roscioli has held senior administrative positions within Forza Italia, serving as national treasurer and administrator since 2023. He had previously served as liquidator of The People of Freedom.

Following the resignation of deputy Francesco Cannizzaro, who had been elected mayor of Reggio Calabria, Roscioli was selected as the centre-right candidate for the September 2026 by-election in the Reggio Calabria single-member constituency. He won with 51.02% of the vote, defeating centre-left candidate Frank Benedetto. He entered the Chamber of Deputies on 1 October 2026.
