= Falcomatà =

Falcomatà is a surname. Notable people with the surname include:

- Giuseppe Falcomatà (born 1983), Italian politician and lawyer, son of Italo
- Italo Falcomatà (1943–2001), Italian politician, teacher, and historian
