= Paul Luvera =

Paul Luvera may refer to:

- Paul N. Luvera (born 1935), American trial lawyer
- Paul N. Luvera Sr. (1898–1990), his father, Washington state senator and totem pole carver
