= Italo Falcomatà =

Italian politician (1943–2001)

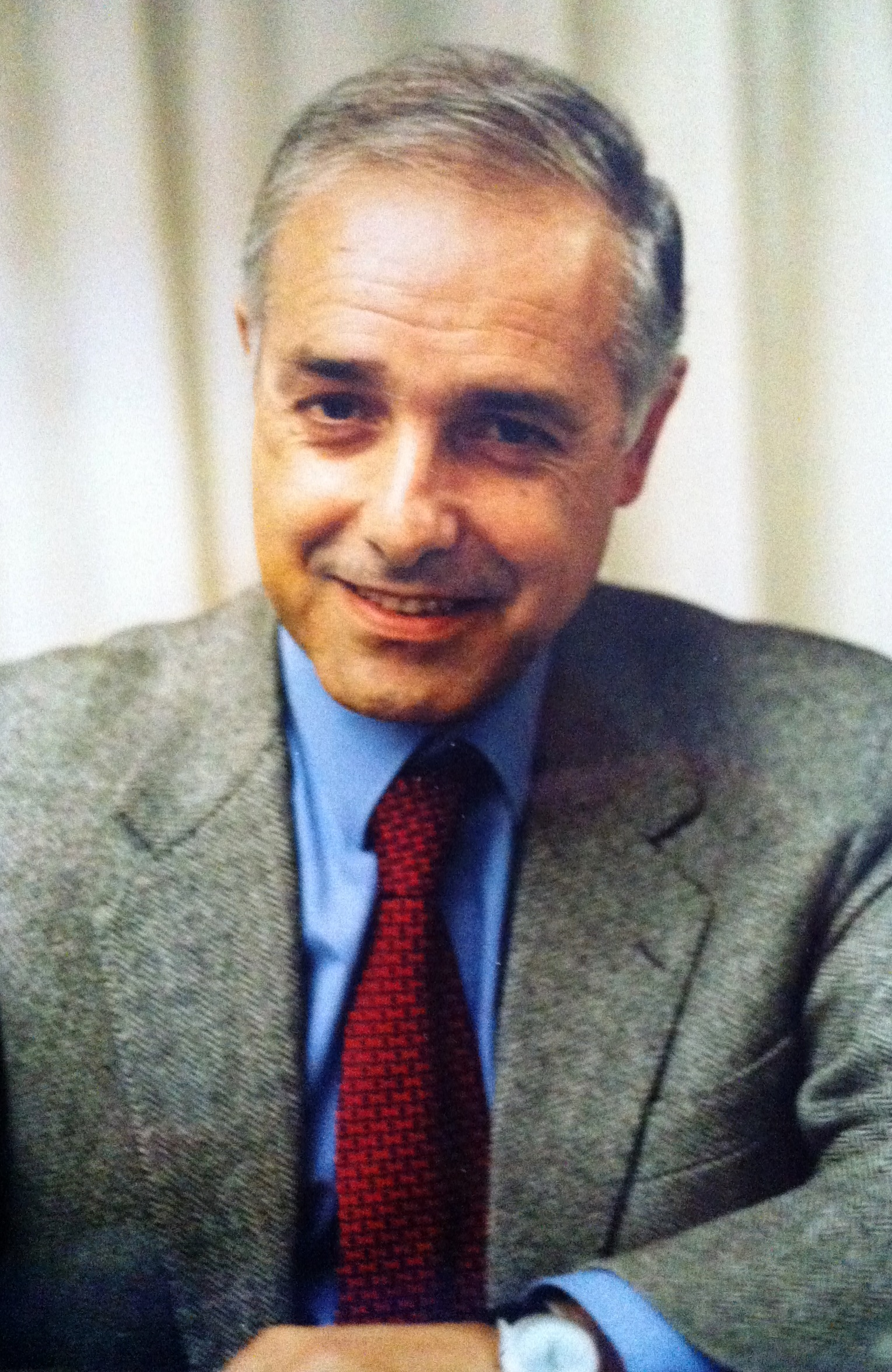
- Falcomatà in 2014

Mayor of Reggio Calabria
- In office 23 November 1993 – 11 December 2001
- Preceded by: Giuseppe Reale
- Succeeded by: Giuseppe Scopelliti

Personal details
- Born: 8 October 1943 Reggio Calabria, Italy
- Died: 11 December 2001 (aged 58) Reggio Calabria, Italy
- Cause of death: Leukemia
- Party: DS (1998–2001)
- Other political affiliations: PCI (1970–1991); PDS (1991–1998)
- Children: Giuseppe Falcomatà

Italo Falcomatà (8 October 1943 – 11 December 2001) was an Italian politician, teacher, and historian who served as the Mayor of Reggio Calabria from 1993 to January 1997, and again from April 1997 to his death in 2001.

== Biography ==
Falcomatà was born in Reggio Calabria on 8 October 1943. He completed his secondary schooling at the Liceo classico Tommaso Campanella and later studied humanities at the University of Messina. His thesis studied the relationship between the Corriere di Calabria and public opinion during World War I.

Falcomatà taught Italian and history at the ITT “Panella-Vallauri.” He later taught contemporary history both at the Università per stranieri "Dante Alighieri" and as part of the University of Messina’s Faculty of Political Science from 1992 to 1993.

Falcomatà’s studies in history led him to doing further research on the role of the bourgeoisie in the period of the “great depression” of the South in the 1970s. He published several works related to the topic, including Giuseppe De Nava, a conservative southern reformist, which earned him a Premio Sila in 1978.

== Bibliography ==
- Vv. Aa. ...E a Reggio sbocciò la primavera. Italo Falcomatà, il primo dei cittadini, Città del Sole Edizioni, 2012, ISBN 8873516157
- Oscar Gaspari, Rosario Forlenza, Sante Cruciani, Storie di sindaci per la storia d'Italia, Donzelli Editore, 2009
