= Chiesa degli Ottimati =

Roman Catholic church in Calabria, Italy

Coordinates: 38.1071°N 15.6433°E

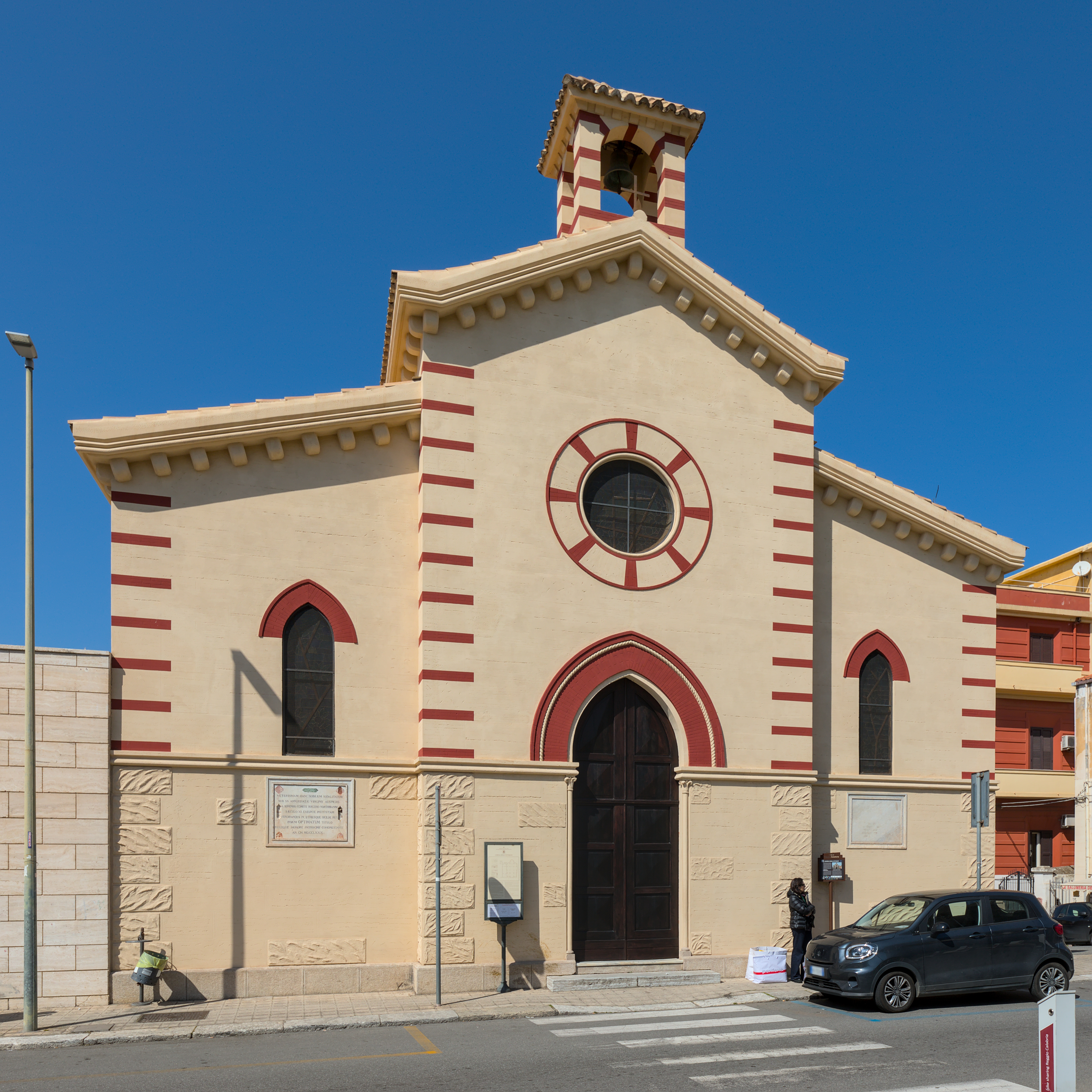
Facade of the Chiesa degli Ottimati

The Chiesa degli Ottimati, also called Santa Maria Annunziata, is a Roman Catholic church located on Via Castello in the city of Reggio Calabria in the region of Calabria, Italy.

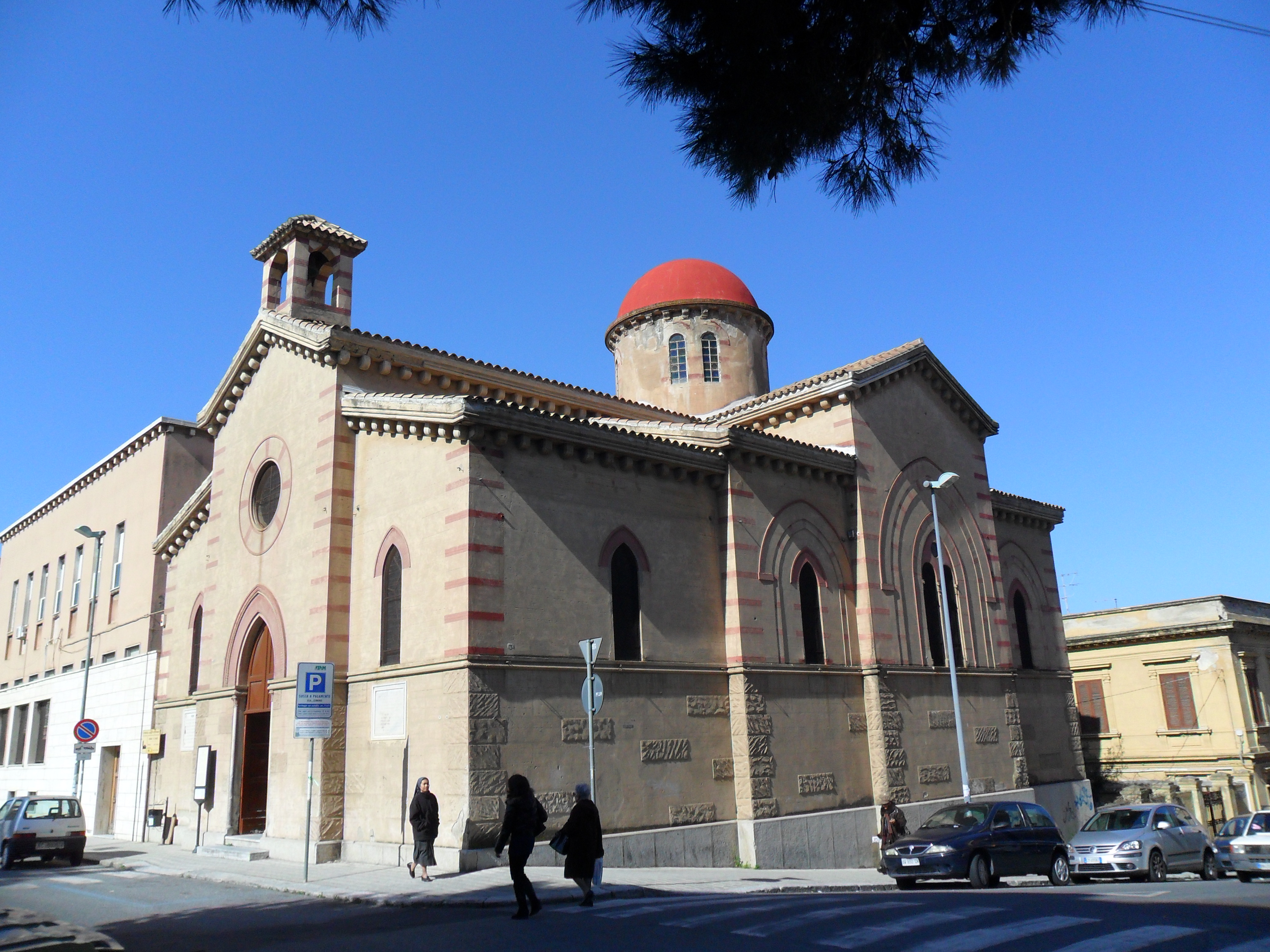
Chiesa degli Ottimati

== History ==
The history of this church is documented as early as the 10th century. The present name derives from a Norman confraternity that rebuilt the church, and dedicated it to the Virgin of the Annunciation. The Ottimati were a congregation of nobles founded by the Normans. Over time, these included the Filocamo, Griso, Altavilla and Borboni.

The original layout appears to have been a Greek cross, with multiple domes. The Normans under Roger II, built a church on top, eliminating many of the domes. On September 3, 1594 the church was damaged and burned during a sack of the town by Saracen raiders. In 1597, the church commissioned a new painting of the Annunciation by Agostino Ciampelli.

By the 18th century, the church was affiliated with the Jesuits, and a school was adjacent. With the suppression of the Jesuits in 1767, the church fell empty. It was damaged by earthquakes in 1783 and 1908. The church rebuilt after 1908 moved from the original location, and was completed in 1933, using a design by Pompilio Seno, who adopted a neo-Byzantine style with Arab-Norman elements. Some elements from the destroyed Norman basilica of Santa Maria di Terreti were used.
