= Paul N. Luvera Sr. =

American politician (1898–1990)

Member of the Washington Senate from the 40th district
- In office 1953–1957
- Preceded by: Jess Sapp
- Succeeded by: Fred Martin

Personal details
- Born: March 25, 1898 Reggio Calabria, Italy
- Died: November 4, 1990 (aged 92) Anacortes, Washington, US
- Party: Republican

Paul N. Luvera Sr. (March 25, 1898 – November 4, 1990) was an Italian immigrant to the United States with a sixth grade education who was a Washington State Senator from 1953 to 1957 and renowned totem pole carver whose work is displayed around the world.

== Early life ==
Luvera was born in 1898 in Reggio Calabria, Italy, the son of Niccola and Fillippa Luvera. In 1910, his family moved to Coleman, Alberta, where Niccola worked in coal mines. In Coleman, Luvera spent one year in school to complete the sixth grade, before, at the age of 13, he started working in the mines and continued there for nine years.

== Career ==
=== Luvera's Fruit Store ===
Niccola eventually developed lung problems from working in the mines, and in 1918, the Luvera family moved to Anacortes, Washington, a coastal town on Fidalgo Island. After working in mills and delivering groceries, Luvera, with his father, opened Luvera's Fruit Store, which catered to local residents as well as fisherman who needed supplies.

=== State senator ===
Luvera ran for the Washington State senate on a promise to fix the main road into the city of Anacortes. The road was near the ocean and prone to flooding. Luvera won a senate seat and served one term from 1953 to 1957. During his term, Luvera secured funding for a new segment of highway built on a hillside safely above floodways. In 2000, in honor of Luvera's efforts to create the roadway, the Washington Senate voted to name it the Paul N. Luvera Sr. Memorial Highway.

=== Totem pole carver ===
After his retirement from both the senate and his grocery store, Luvera devoted his time to his hobby of carving totem poles, an art form based on the Native American tradition. In 1977, he wrote a book entitled How to Carve and Paint Totem Poles, which he self-published and eventually went into seven printings. It was purported to have sold 30,000 copies.

Though Luvera was criticized for borrowing the Native American craft of totem pole carving, he declared a respect for Native American art and asserted the craft had been nearly lost and needed to be preserved.

Luvera's carvings became well known and can be found in such places as Tacaoma Point Defiance Park in Tacoma, Washington; Rotterdam, the Netherlands; Yokohama, Japan; and Stockholm, Sweden.

== Death ==
Luvera died in his Anacortes home on Sunday, November 4, 1990, at the age of 92. He was survived by his wife of 64 years, his two daughters Phyllis Luvera Ennes and Anita Luvera Mayer, and his son Paul N. Luvera Jr.
