= Giuseppina Princi =

Italian politician (born 1972)

Giuseppina Princi MEP
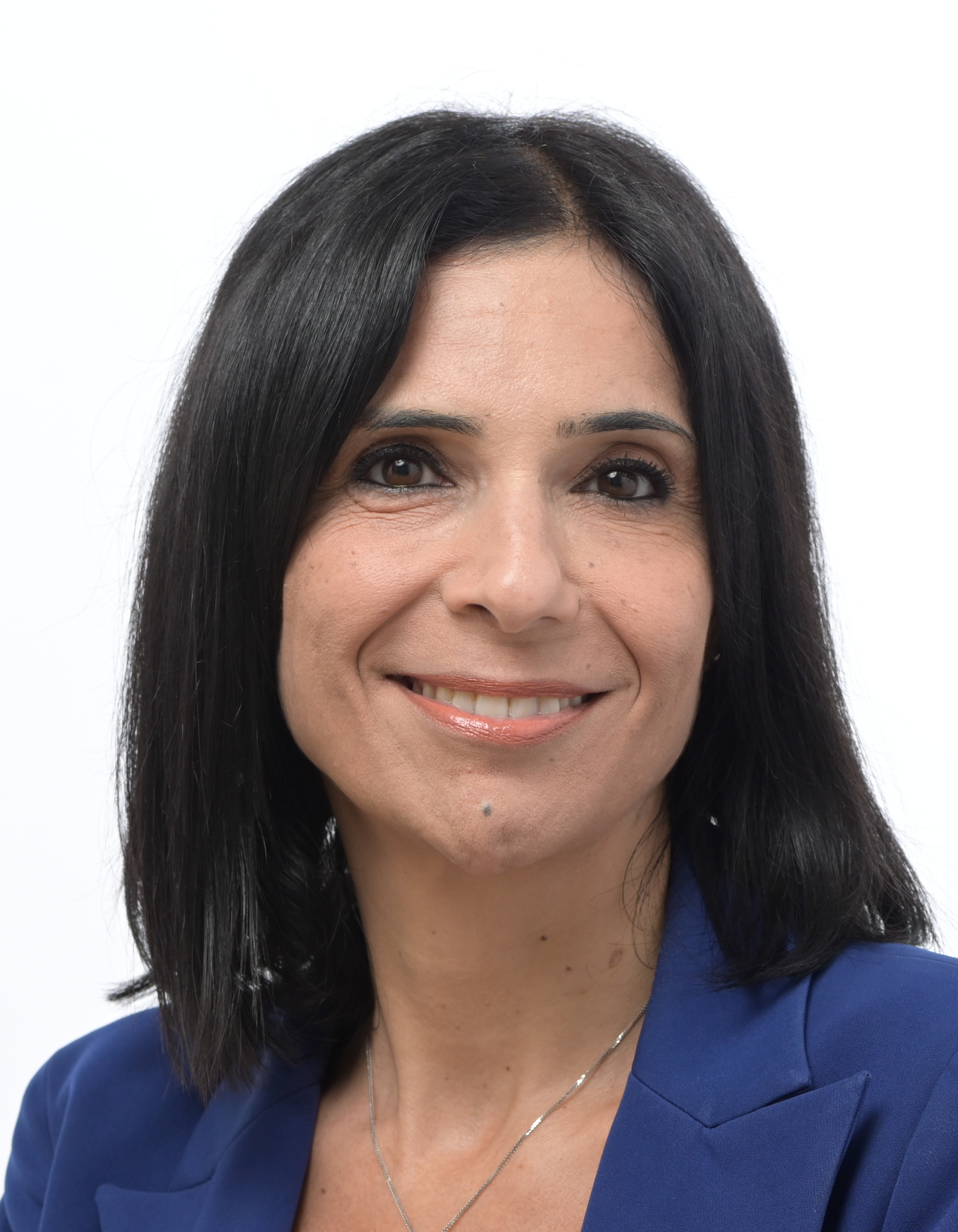
- Princi in 2024

Member of the European Parliament for Southern Italy
- Incumbent
- Assumed office 16 July 2024

Personal details
- Born: 27 September 1972 (age 53)
- Party: Forza Italia
- Other political affiliations: European People's Party
- Relatives: Francesco Cannizzaro (cousin)

Giuseppina Princi (born 27 September 1972) is an Italian politician of Forza Italia who was elected member of the European Parliament in 2024. From 2021 to 2024, she served as vice president of Calabria. She is the cousin of Francesco Cannizzaro.
