= Giuseppe Falcomatà =

Italian politician and lawyer (born 1983)

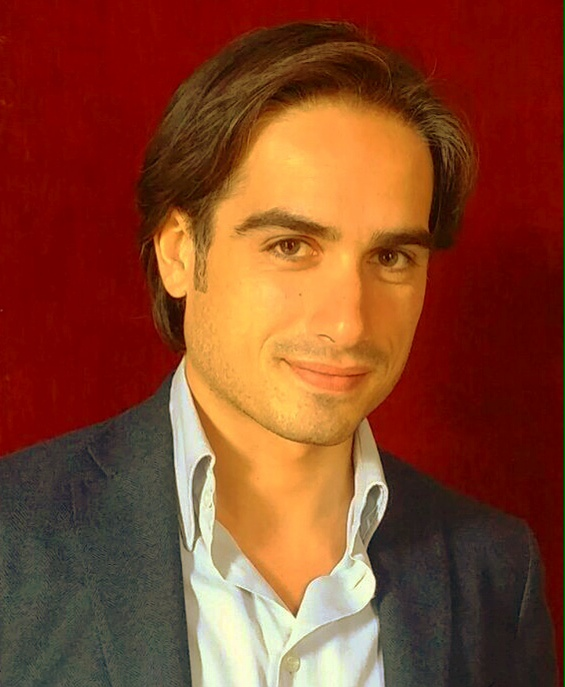

Member of the Regional Council of Calabria
- Incumbent
- Assumed office 11 November 2025
- Constituency: Reggio Calabria

Mayor of Reggio Calabria
- In office 29 October 2014 – 10 January 2026
- Preceded by: Demetrio Arena
- Succeeded by: Francesco Cannizzaro

Personal details
- Born: Giuseppe Tiberio Falcomatà; 18 September 1983 (age 43) Reggio Calabria, Italy
- Party: Democratic Party
- Education: Mediterranea University of Reggio Calabria
- Profession: Lawyer

Giuseppe Falcomatà (born 18 September 1983) is an Italian politician and lawyer who served as the mayor of Reggio Calabria from 2014 to 2026.

== Biography ==
Giuseppe Falcomatà is the youngest child of Italo Falcomatà (1943–2001), former mayor of Reggio and promoter of the Reggio Spring movement. He attended a high school in Reggio. In 2006, he graduated from the Mediterranea University of Reggio Calabria with a degree in Law. He has been a practicing lawyer since 2010.

He has held public offices since 2007. In 2011, he was elected to Reggio Calabria's city council.

On 6 July 2014, he won his party's nomination for the mayor of Reggio Calabria. He won the mayoral election on 26 October 2014, with 60.99% of the vote.

He was elected member of the Regional Council of Calabria in the 2025 regional election.

== Works ==
- Giuseppe Falcomatà (2011). La vendetta immobile. Reggio Calabria: Città del Sole Edizioni. ISBN 978-88-7351-452-7.
- Giuseppe Falcomatà (2014). Un bicchiere di sole. Reggio Calabria: Città del Sole Edizioni. ISBN 978-88-7351-841-9.
