= Chiesa di Gesù e Maria, Reggio Calabria =

Roman Catholic church in Italy

Coordinates: 38.107919°N 15.645256°E

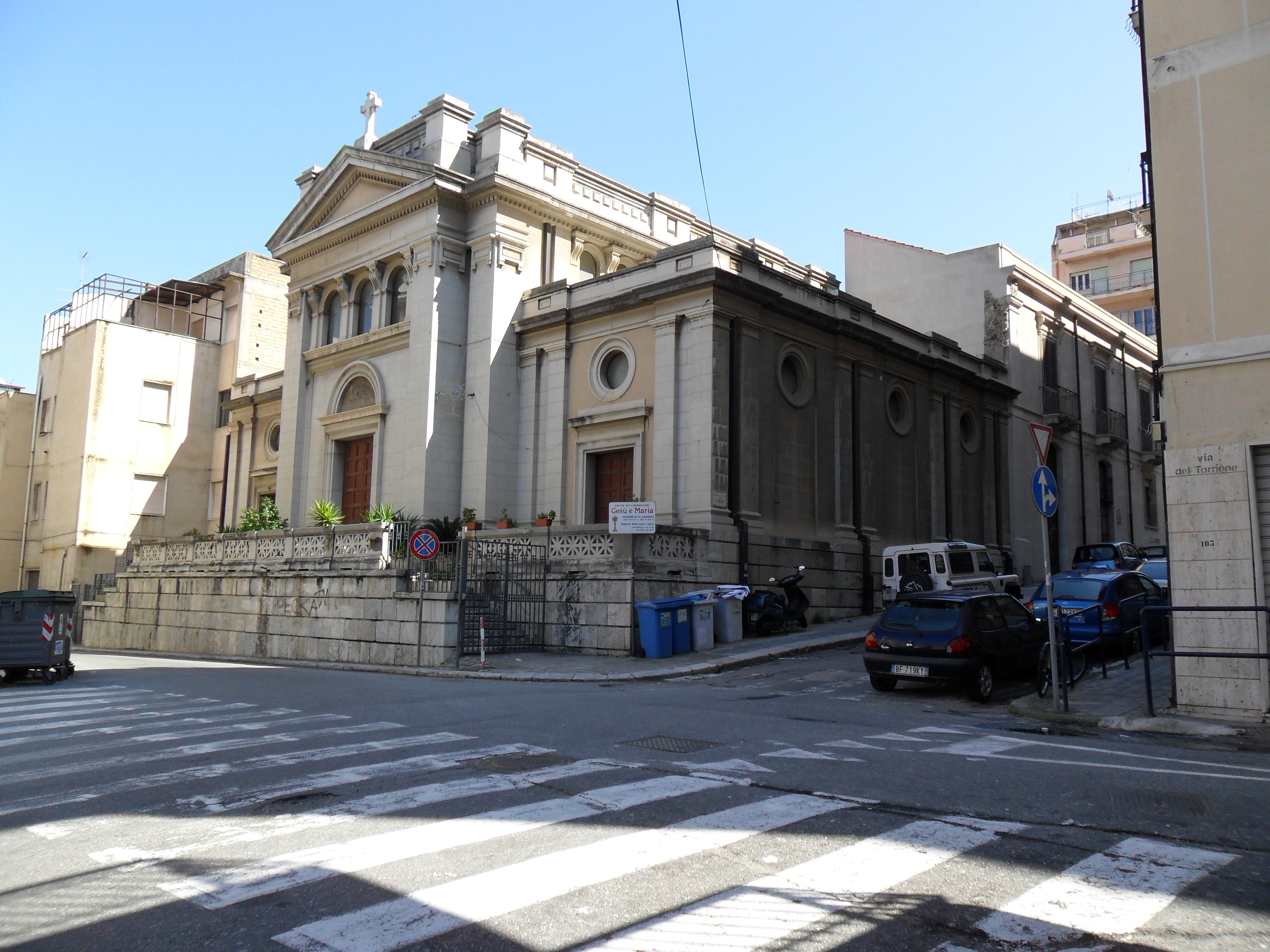
Chiesa di Gesù e Maria

The Chiesa di Gesù e Maria is a Roman Catholic church located in the city of Reggio Calabria in the region of Calabria, Italy.

The damaged church at the site was razed after the 1908 earthquake and rebuilt in a neoclassical-style. It has three naves. On the right is the Funeral monument to Giuseppe Molisani. The church houses a modern bronze Via Crucis by the sculptor Ennio Tesei. The two angels on the main altar support a throne, and the reliefs on the two lecterns are by the sculptor Pasquale Panetta.
