= Research Centre for Mediterranean Relations =

Coordinates: 38.1083075°N 15.6458055°E

- Established: 2010
- Director: Roberto Mavilia
- Location: Reggio Calabria
- Website: medalics.org

Research Centre for Mediterranean Relations (MEDAlics) is established in Dante Alighieri University for Foreigners in 2010 and it was originated from the goal of the Global Network for the Economics of Learning (Globelics), Innovation, and Competence Building Systems.

Research key domains:

1. Building the Mediterranean research area on knowledge, learning, innovation and competence building Systems;
2. Study the Innovation Approach for the Integration and Development of the Mediterranean area;
3. Inclusive and Sustainable Innovation Systems in the Region;
4. Innovation to deal with the impact of the Globalization of Mediterranean region.

MEDAlics has implemented and still maintains a management system, which complies with the standards ISO 9001:2008 (Quality management systems) for research and development activities in Socio-Economics sciences and Engineering fields (EA34).

== See also ==
- Università per stranieri "Dante Alighieri" di Reggio Calabria
