= Giulio Centenaro =

Italian politician (born 1966)

Member of the Chamber of Deputies
- Incumbent
- Assumed office 26 March 2026
- Preceded by: Massimo Bitonci

Member of the Regional Council of Veneto
- In office 6 October 2020 – 22 November 2025

Personal details
- Born: 26 March 1966 (age 60) Santa Giustina in Colle, Province of Padua, Italy
- Party: Lega

Giulio Centenaro (born 26 March 1966) is an Italian politician of Lega who has served as a member of the Chamber of Deputies since March 2026. He previously served as a member of the Regional Council of Veneto from 2020 to 2025.

From 1995 to 2023, he was also a councillor and assessor in his hometown, Santa Giustina in Colle, and served as a councillor of the Province of Padua from 2009 to 2014.
