= Francesco Cannizzaro =

Italian politician (born 1982)

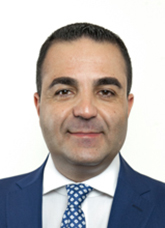
- Cannizzaro in 2018

Mayor of Reggio Calabria
- Incumbent
- Assumed office 4 June 2026
- Preceded by: Giuseppe Falcomatà

Member of the Chamber of Deputies
- In office 23 March 2018 – 22 July 2026
- Constituency: Calabria – 07 (2018–2022); Calabria – 05 (2022–2026)

Member of the Regional Council of Calabria
- In office 11 December 2014 – 18 June 2018
- Succeeded by: Giuseppe Pedà

Personal details
- Born: 24 June 1982 (age 44) Reggio Calabria, Italy
- Party: Forza Italia (since 2015)
- Relatives: Giuseppina Princi (cousin)
- Education: University for Foreigners "Dante Alighieri" of Reggio Calabria

Francesco Cannizzaro (born 24 June 1982) is an Italian politician serving as mayor of Reggio Calabria since June 2026. He previously served as a member of the Chamber of Deputies (2018–2026) and as a member of the Regional Council of Calabria (2014–2018) . He is the cousin of Giuseppina Princi.
