= Alberto Di Rubba =

Italian politician (born 1979)

Member of the Chamber of Deputies
- Incumbent
- Assumed office 23 March 2026
- Preceded by: Alberto Stefani
- Constituency: Veneto 2 – U01

Personal details
- Born: 26 January 1979 (age 47)
- Party: Lega

Alberto Di Rubba (born 26 January 1979) is an Italian politician who was elected member of the Chamber of Deputies in 2026. He has served as treasurer of Lega since 2023.
