= Università per stranieri "Dante Alighieri" di Reggio Calabria =

Coordinates: 38.1083°N 15.6459°E

University for Foreigners "Dante Alighieri" of Reggio Calabria
- Università per stranieri Dante Alighieri di Reggio Calabria
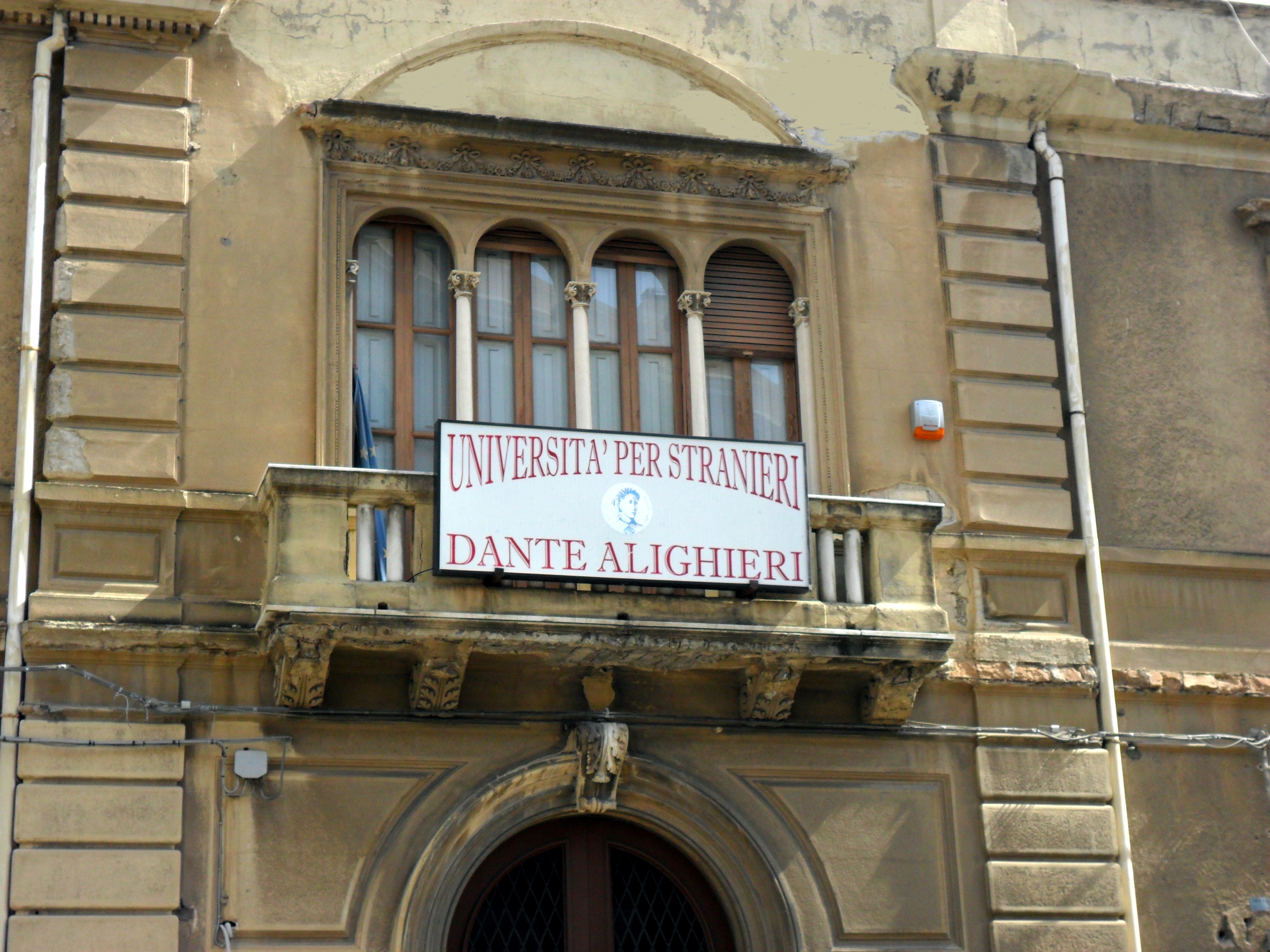
- Motto: Un ponte per la storia e la cultura del Mediterraneo
- Type: Private
- Established: 2007; 19 years ago
- Rector: Prof. Salvatore Berlingò
- Students: 688
- Location: Reggio Calabria, Italy
- Website: www.unistrada.it/

The Università per stranieri Dante Alighieri di Reggio Calabria, often simply abbreviated as "Unistrad" is a private university founded in 2007 in Reggio Calabria. It is one of the three universities historically for foreign students in Italy, together with the Università per Stranieri di Perugia and Università per Stranieri di Siena The headquarters of this private university is located in the city center on Via del Torrione, near the Aragonese Castle and the Archaeological Museum of Reggio Calabria, which houses the famous Riace Bronzes.

== History ==
The Dante Alighieri University for Foreigners of Reggio Calabria has been a significant academic institution for over 40 years, founded in 1984 with the goal of promoting the knowledge of Italian language and culture. In 2007, it received official recognition from the Ministry of University and Research, further solidifying its educational and cultural role.

Dante Alighieri is one of only three Universities for Foreigners in Italy, alongside the University for Foreigners of Perugia and the University for Foreigners of Siena, and is the only one located in the South of Italy. Its primary mission was originally to promote Italian culture, with a particular focus on its relationship with the countries of the Mediterranean basin.

Today, through its teaching and research activities, the university dedicates itself to the understanding of Italy's and European political, social, and economic institutions, while fostering greater integration between Europe and Mediterranean nations.

The university's motto, "A bridge for the history and culture of the Mediterranean," encapsulates its mission to create intercultural dialogue between Italy and Mediterranean countries. For decades, Dante Alighieri University has welcomed hundreds of students from around the world, serving as a key hub for those eager to immerse themselves in Italian language and culture.

=== Mediterranean studies ===
The Research Centre for Mediterranean Relations (MEDAlics) is established in Dante Alighieri University for Foreigners in 2010 and it was originated from the goal of the Global Network for the Economics of Learning (Globelics), Innovation, and Competence Building Systems.

Research key domains:

1. Building the Mediterranean research area on knowledge, learning, innovation and competence building Systems;
2. Study the Innovation Approach for the Integration and Development of the Mediterranean area;
3. Inclusive and Sustainable Innovation Systems in the Region;
4. Innovation to deal with the impact of the Globalization of Mediterranean region.

MEDAlics has implemented and still maintains a management system, which complies with the standards ISO 9001:2008 (Quality management systems) for research and development activities in Socio-Economics sciences and Engineering fields (EA34).

== Organisation ==
=== Faculties ===
These are the 2 faculties in which the university is divided into:

- Faculty of Education Sciences
- Faculty of Social Sciences and Mediterranean studies

=== Rectors ===
The Rector is the highest academic authority.

- Salvatore Berlingò
- Antonino Zumbo

== Reputation ==
The University for Foreigners "Dante Alighieri" in Reggio Calabria has been recognized as one of Italy's top universities, according to the StuDocu World University Ranking 2020. This survey, conducted by the Dutch startup StuDocu among 100,000 students from over 27 countries, placed the university fourth in Italy and 28th in Europe. The institution stands out for its long-standing focus on inclusion and intercultural exchange, with 20% of its students coming from countries like Latin America, Russia, and Egypt.

This achievement is particularly significant as it reflects the direct opinions of students, with the university being the only one from Southern Italy to rank in the top ten. The other top-ranking Italian universities include Bocconi University in Milan and the University of Camerino.

== See also ==
- List of Italian universities
- Research Centre for Mediterranean Relations
