= List of mayors of Reggio Calabria =

Mayor of Reggio Calabria
- Sindaco di Reggio Calabria

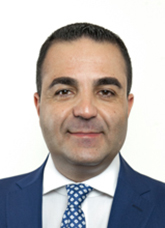
- Incumbent; Francesco Cannizzaro (FI) since 4 June 2026
- Appointer: Popular election
- Term length: 5 years, renewable once
- Website: Official website

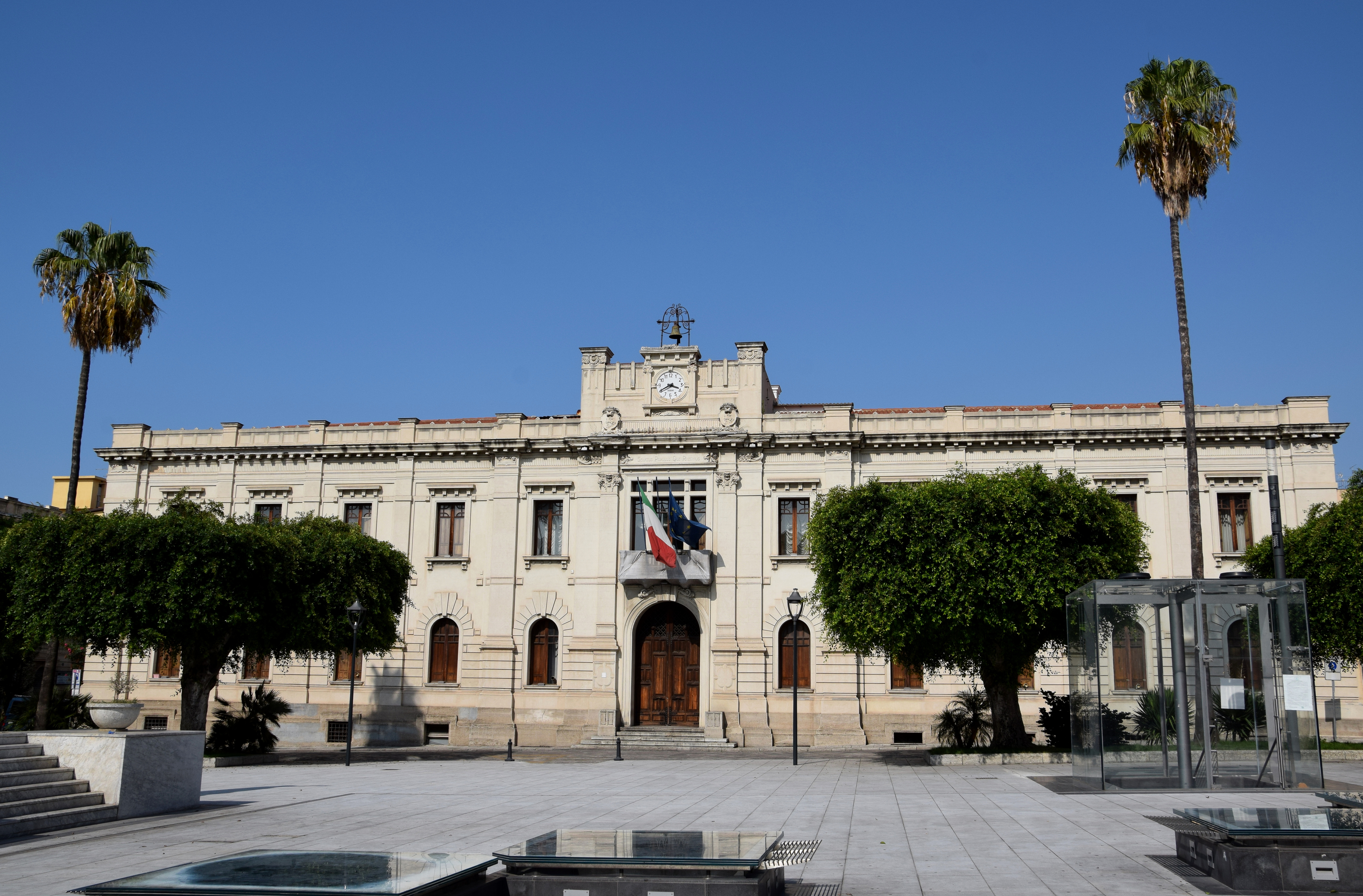
Palazzo San Giorgio is the seat of the mayor of Reggio Calabria.

The mayor of Reggio Calabria is an elected politician who, along with the Reggio Calabria's city council, is accountable for the strategic government of Reggio Calabria in Calabria, Italy.

The current mayor is Francesco Cannizzaro (FI), who took office on 4 June 2026.

== Kingdom of Italy (1861–1946) ==
	Mayor	Term start	Term end	Party
1	Francesco Pensabene	1861	1864	Independent
2	Domenico Spanò Bolani	1864	1865	Right
3	Francesco Pensabene	1865	1868	Right
4	Baron Francesco Mantica	1868	1870	Right
5	Domenico Spanò Bolani	1870	1875	Right
6	Luigi De Blasio	1875	1879	Left
7	Fabrizio Plutino	1879	1884	Left
8	Marquess Domenico Genoese Zerbi	1884	1886	Right
9	Domenico Spanò Bolani	1886	1890	Right
10	Pietro Foti	1890	1895	Left
11	Domenico Tripepi	1895	1900	Right
12	Giuseppe Carbone	1900	1903	Left
13	Domenico Tripepi	1903	1906	Right
14	Demetrio Tripepi	1906	1911	Right
15	Fabrizio Plutino	1911	1914	Left
16	Giuseppe Valentino	1914	1924	Socialist
17	Nicola D'Avanzo	1924	1926	Socialist
Fascist Podestà (1926–1943)
1	Giuseppe Genoese Zerbi	1926	1930	PNF
2	Pasquale Mauritano	1930	1935	PNF
3	Francesco Giunta	1935	1943	PNF
Allied occupation (1943–1946)
18	Antonio Priolo	1943	1943	Socialist
19	Diego Andiloro	1943	1946	Socialist

== Italian Republic (since 1946) ==
=== City Council election (1946–1997) ===
From 1946 to 1997, the Mayor of Reggio Calabria was elected by the City Council.

	Mayor	Term start	Term end	Party	Coalition	Election
1	Nicola Siles	2 May 1946	25 February 1947	DC	DC • PRI	1946
2	Giuseppe Romeo	25 February 1947	29 July 1956	DC	DC • PRI	1946
2	Giuseppe Romeo	25 February 1947	29 July 1956	DC	DC • PRI • PLI	1951
3	Domenico Spoleti	29 July 1956	25 February 1958	DC	DC • PRI • PLI	1956
4	Vittorio Barone Adesi	25 February 1958	5 January 1961	DC	DC • PRI • PLI	1956
5	Giuseppe Quattrone	4 January 1961	16 December 1963	DC	DC • PRI • PLI • PSDI	1960
6	Domenico Mannino	16 December 1963	2 March 1965	DC	DC • PRI • PLI • PSDI	1960
(4)	Vittorio Barone Adesi	2 March 1965	12 March 1966	DC	DC • PLI • PSDI	1964
7	Pietro Battaglia	12 March 1966	18 November 1971	DC	DC • PLI • PSDI	1964
8	Fortunato Licandro	18 November 1971	20 August 1975	DC	DC • PLI • PSDI	1970
9	Luigi Aliquò	20 August 1975	20 May 1977	DC	DC • PLI • PRI • PSDI	1975
10	Domenico Cuzzopoli	20 May 1977	28 November 1980	DC	DC • PLI • PRI • PSDI	1975
11	Oreste Granillo	28 November 1980	11 November 1982	DC	DC • PSI • PRI • PSDI	1980
(10)	Domenico Cuzzopoli	11 November 1982	18 February 1983	DC	DC • PSI • PRI • PSDI	1980
-	Special Prefectural Commissioner tenure (18 February 1983–7 August 1983) (Note: Nominated by the Prefect after the City Council failed to elect a Mayor.)					
12	Michele Musolino	7 August 1983	14 February 1984	PSI	PSI • PCI • PSDI • PRI	1983
13	Giovanni Palamara	14 February 1984	8 September 1985	PSI	PSI • PCI • PSDI • PRI	1983
14	Pino Mallamo	8 September 1985	14 September 1987	DC	DC • PRI • PSDI	1983
(12)	Michele Musolino	14 September 1987	4 July 1988	Ind	DC • PRI • PSDI	1983
(9)	Luigi Aliquò	4 July 1988	1 September 1989	DC	DC • PRI • PSDI	1983
(7)	Pietro Battaglia	1 September 1989	28 February 1990	DC	DC • PSI • PRI • PSDI • PLI	1989
15	Agatino Licandro	1 March 1990	4 July 1992	DC	DC • PSI • PRI • PSDI • PLI	1989
16	Francesco Gangemi	4 July 1992	31 July 1992	DC	DC • PSI • PRI • PSDI • PLI	1989
17	Giuseppe Reale	31 July 1992	23 November 1993	DC	DC • PSI • PRI • PSDI	1992
18	Italo Falcomatà	23 November 1993	28 April 1997	PDS	PDS • PSI • PRI • LR	1992

=== Direct election (since 1997) ===
Since 1997, enacting a new law on local administrations, the Mayor of Reggio Calabria is chosen by direct election, originally every four, and since 2001 every five years.

Mayor		Term start	Term end	Party	Coalition	Election
(18)	Italo Falcomatà (1943–2001)	28 April 1997	14 May 2001	PDS; DS	The Olive Tree (DS-PPI-PRC-SDI)	1997
(18)	Italo Falcomatà (1943–2001)	14 May 2001	11 December 2001 (Note: Died in office. The deputy Mayor Demetrio Naccari Carlizzi (DS) held the office till a new municipal election was held.)	PDS; DS	The Olive Tree (DS-DL-PRC-SDI-PdCI)	2001
19	Giuseppe Scopelliti (b. 1966)	28 May 2002	28 May 2007	AN; PdL	House of Freedoms (FI-AN-UDC-UDEUR)	2002
19	Giuseppe Scopelliti (b. 1966)	28 May 2007	14 May 2010 (Note: Resigned after being elected President of Calabria. The deputy Mayor Giuseppe Raffa (PdL) held the office till a new municipal election was held.)	AN; PdL	House of Freedoms (FI-AN-UDC-PRI)	2007
20	Demetrio Arena (b. 1956)	16 May 2011	9 October 2012 (Note: Removed from office.)	PdL	PdL • UDC • MpA	2011
Special Commission's tenure (9 October 2012 – 29 October 2014) (Note: Special Commission nominated after the municipal administration had been dissolved by the Government due to 'Ndrangheta association.)
21	Giuseppe Falcomatà (b. 1983)	29 October 2014	5 October 2020	PD	PD • SEL • CD • PSI	2014
21	Giuseppe Falcomatà (b. 1983)	5 October 2020 (Note: Election originally scheduled to take place in May 2020, then postponed due to the COVID-19 pandemic.)	10 January 2026 (Note: Resigned after being elected regional councillor. The deputy Mayor Domenico Battaglia (PD) held the office till a new municipal election was held.)	PD	PD • IV • PSI	2020
22	Francesco Cannizzaro (b. 1982)	4 June 2026	Incumbent	FI	FI • FdI • Lega • AP • NM • A	2026
