= Paul N. Luvera =

American trial lawyer based in Seattle (born 1935)

Paul N. Luvera (born 1935) is an American trial lawyer based in Seattle.

== Career ==
In 2010, the American Trial Lawyers Association (ATLA) inducted him and four others as one of the members of the American Trial Lawyers Hall of Fame. He has also been listed in Best Lawyers in America since its inception in 1978. Lawdragon called him "the dean of the plaintiffs' bar for all the Northwest."

Luvera is a member of the Inner Circle of Advocates, and has served as its president. He is a member of the American College of Trial Lawyers, and is a current member and past president of the Washington State Association for Justice.
