= Reggio Calabria =

City in Calabria, Italy

Reggio Calabria Riggiu (Calabrian) Ρήγι/Rìji (Calabrian Greek)
- Comune
- Città di Reggio Calabria
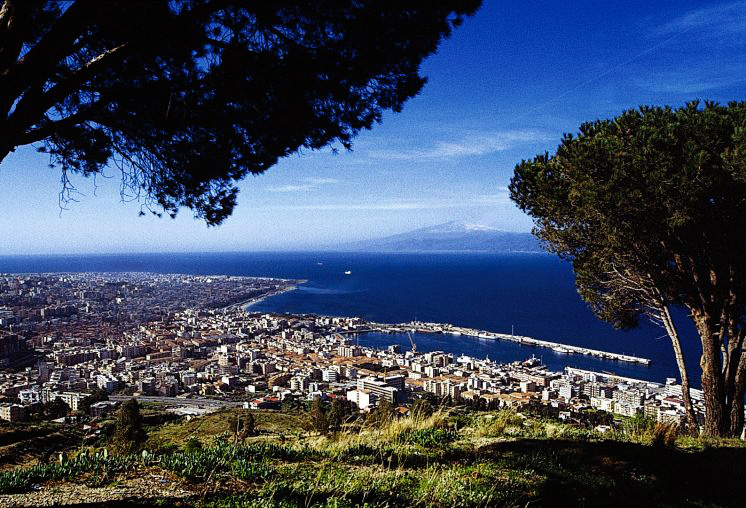
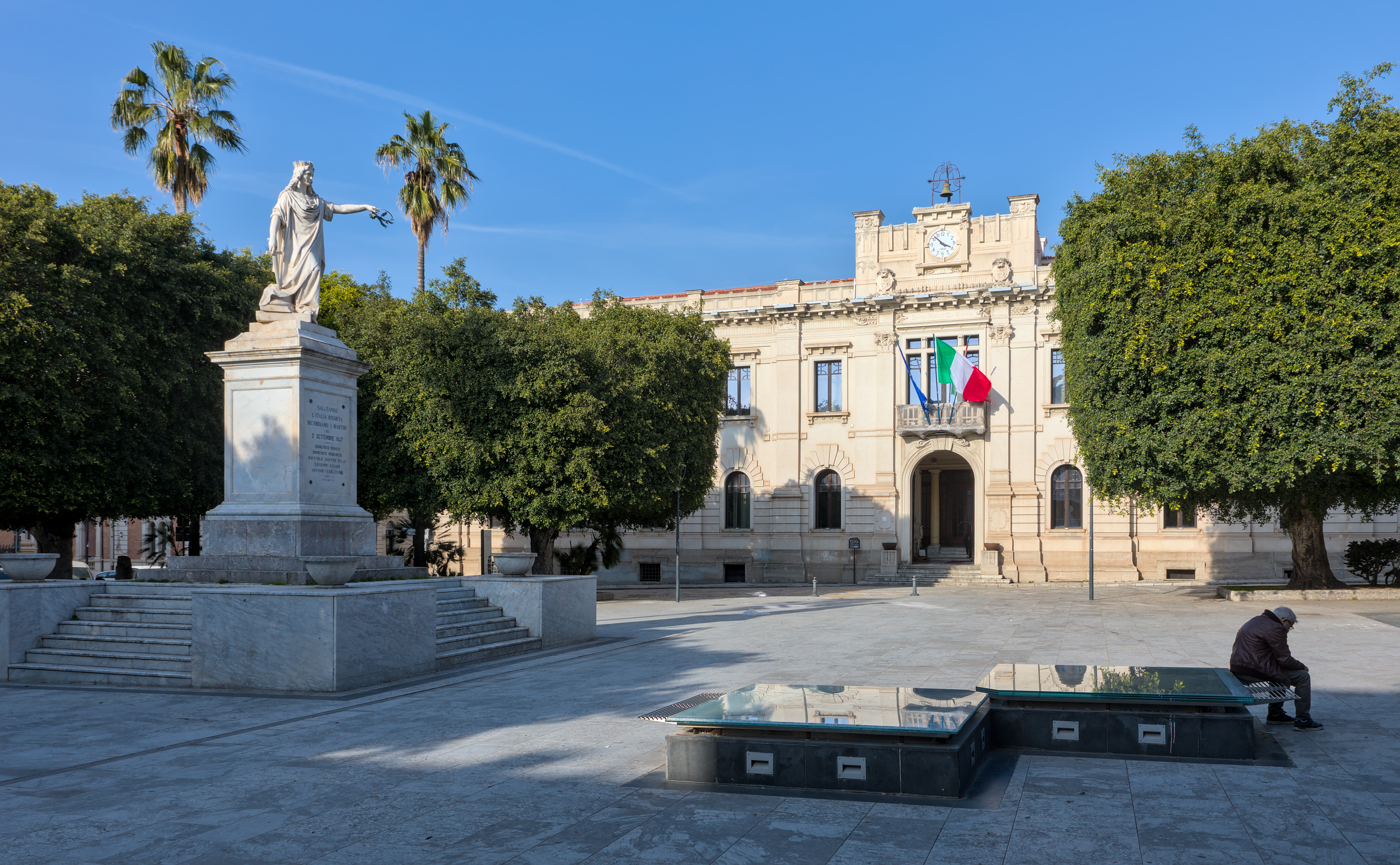
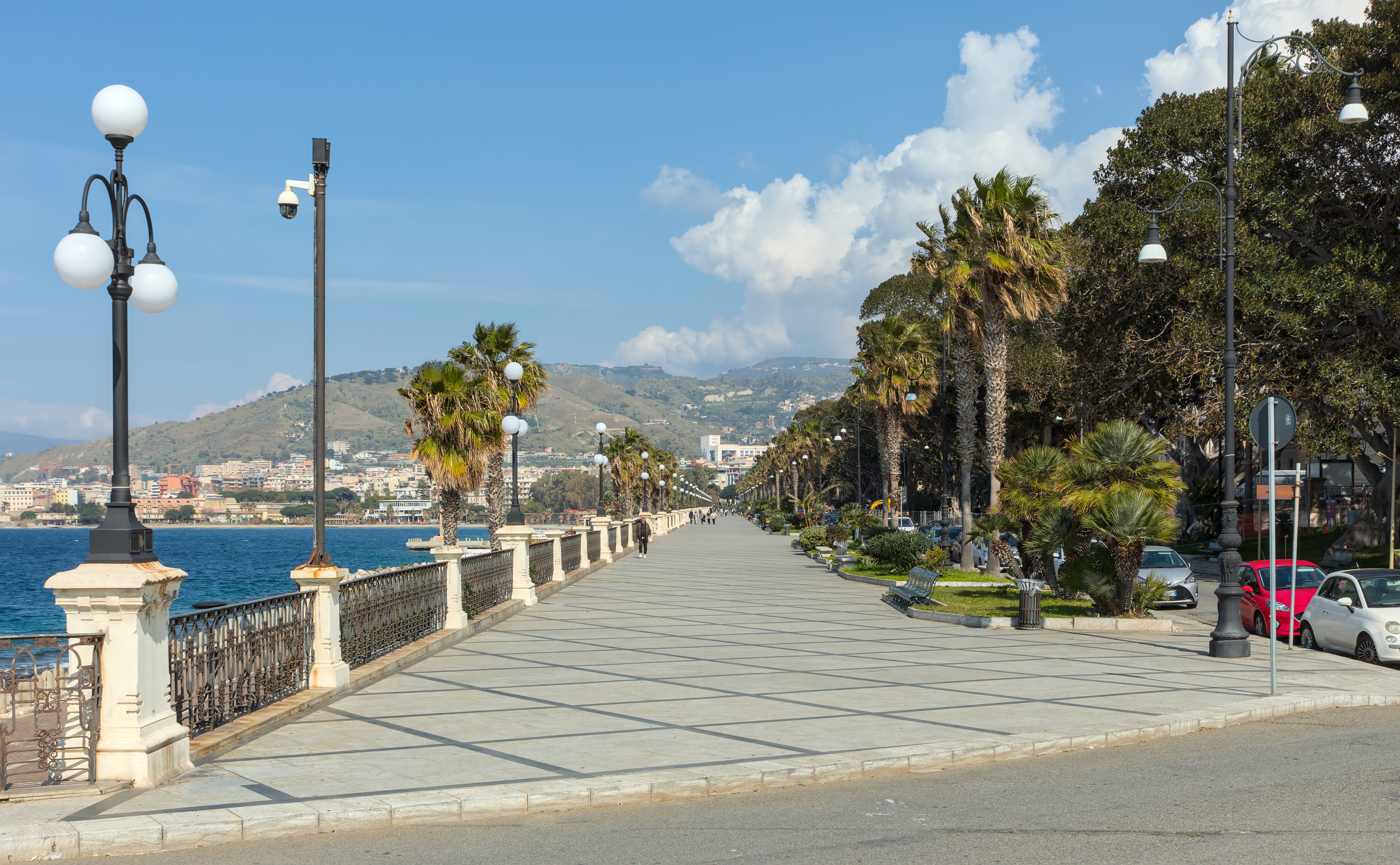
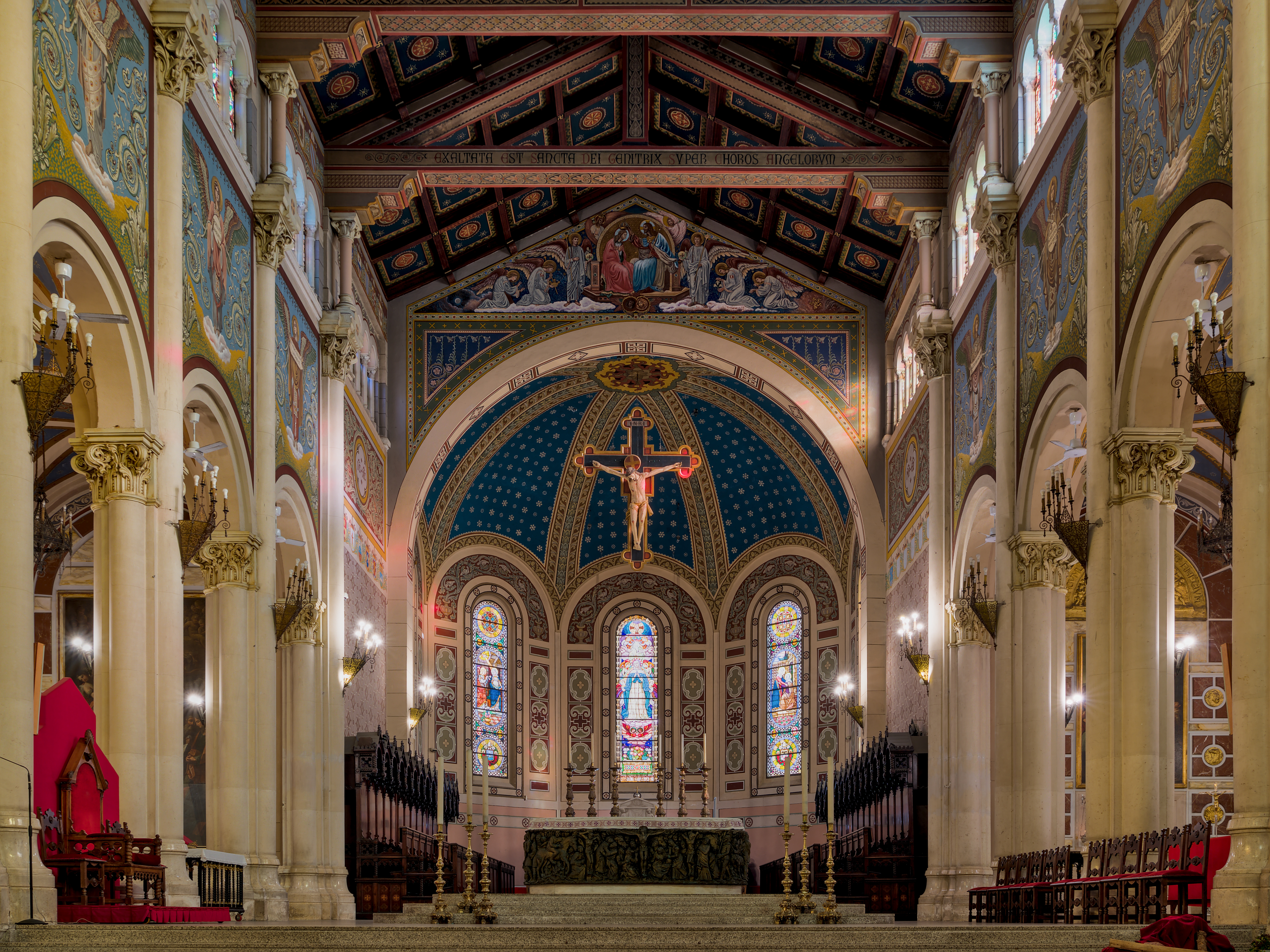
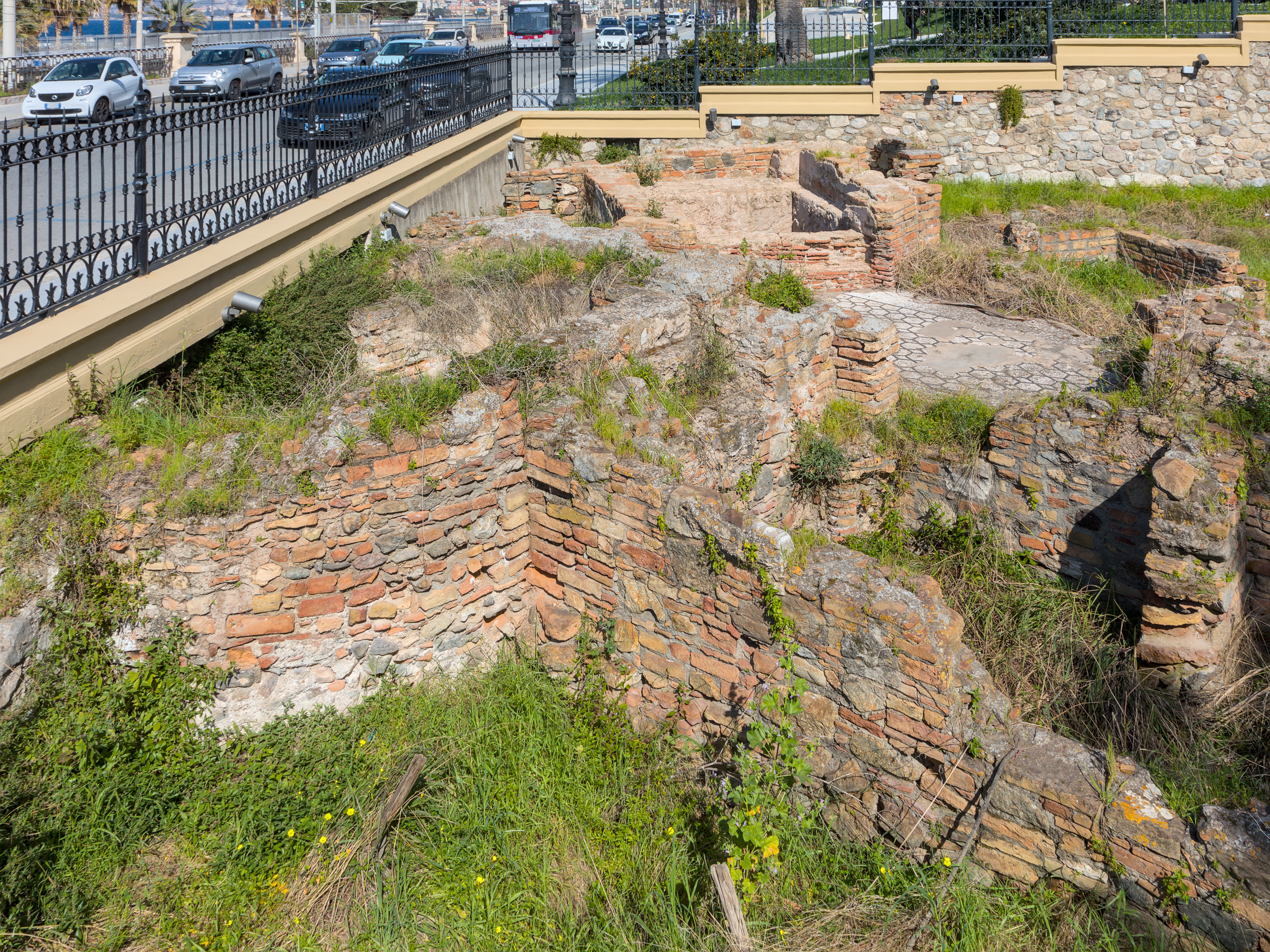
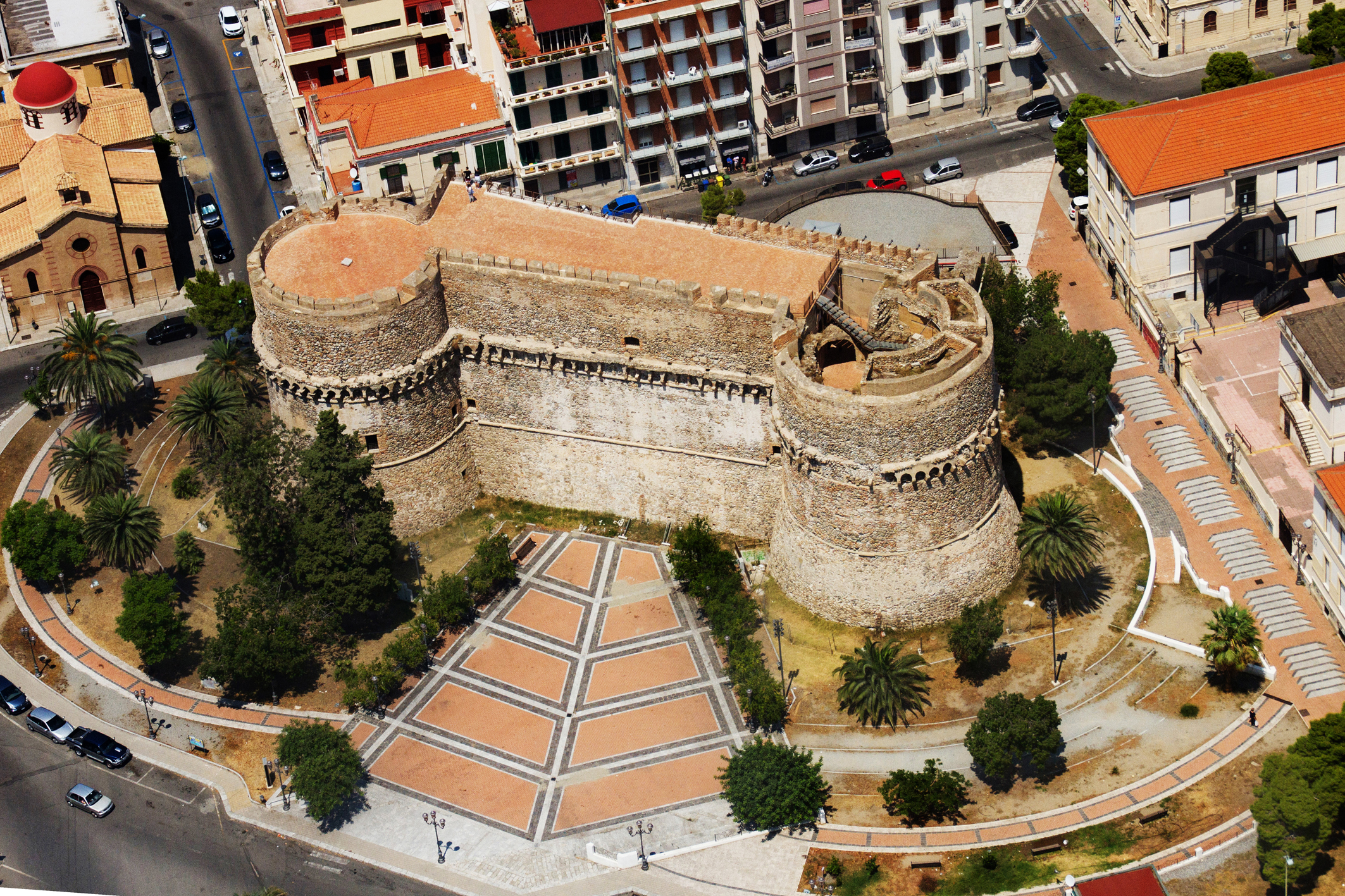
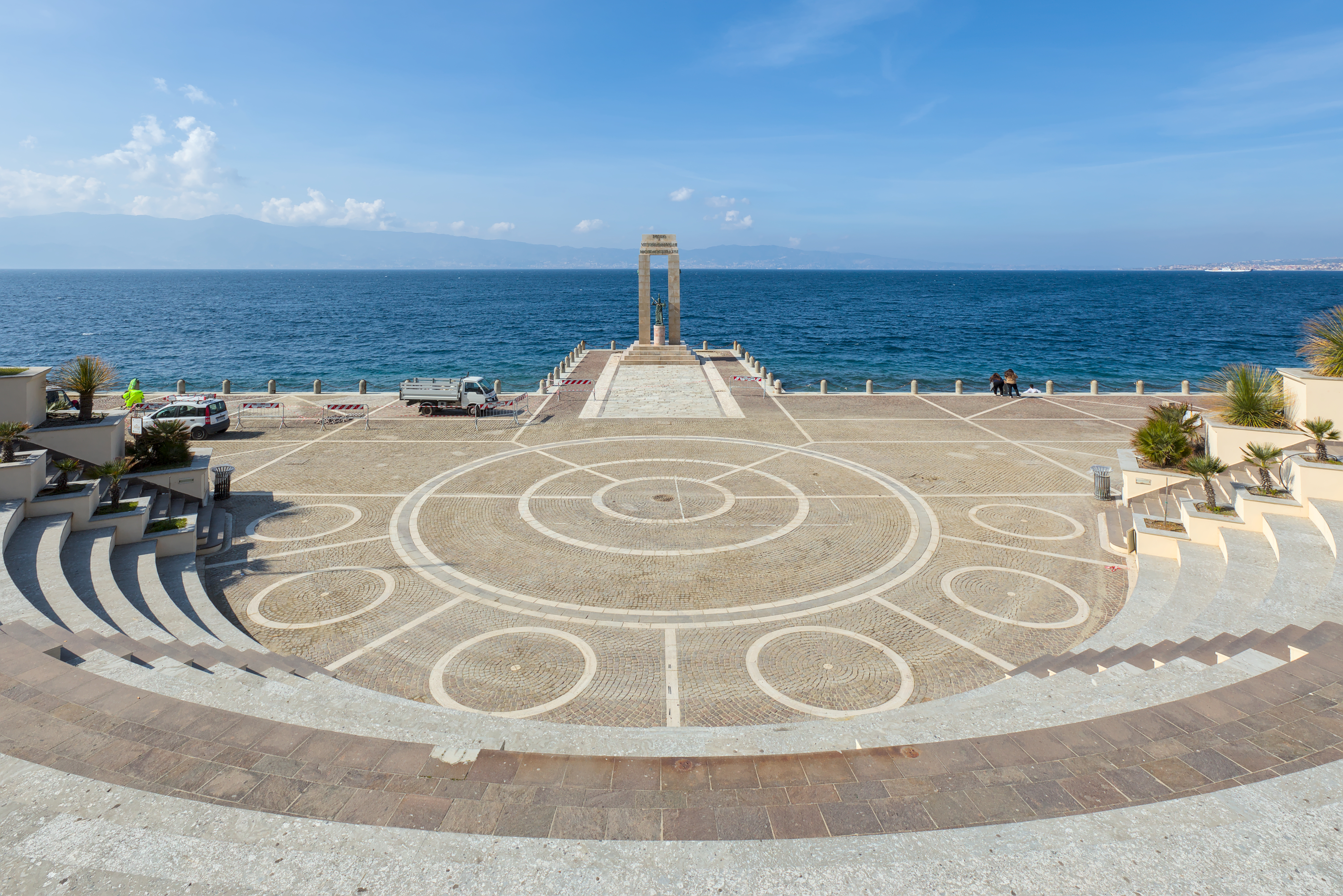
- Clockwise from top: Aerial view, Lungomare Falcomatà, the historical Roman baths of Reggio Calabria, Arena dello stretto, Castello Aragonese, Reggio Calabria Cathedral, Piazza Italia

- Flag Coat of arms
- Nickname: the city of Fata Morgana
- Location within Calabria Location within Italy Location within Europe
- Coordinates: 38°06′41″N 15°39′43″E
- Country: Italy
- Region: Calabria
- Metropolitan city: Reggio Calabria (RC)
- Founded: 743 BC on a more ancient Ausonian-Italic settlement (15th century BC)

Government
  - Mayor: Francesco Cannizzaro

Area
  - Total: 239.04 km^{2} (92.29 sq mi)

Population (2026)
  - Total: 167,925
  - Density: 702.50/km^{2} (1,819.5/sq mi)
- Demonym(s): Reggino, Rhegian (archaic)
- Time zone: UTC+1 (CET)
  - Summer (DST): UTC+2 (CEST)
- Postal code: 89100 (generic) from 89121 to 89135
- Dialing code: 0039 0965
- ISTAT code: 080063
- Website: reggiocal.it

Reggio Calabria, (Note: Also Reggio di Calabria. Pronunciation of Reggio di Calabria: /ˈrɛdʒioʊ diː kəˈlæbriə/, US also /ˈrɛdʒ(i)oʊ diː kɑːˈlɑːbriə/; Italian: [ˈreddʒo di kaˈlaːbrja, ˈrɛddʒo -]. Sicilian: Riggiu; Calabrian Greek: Ρήγι, romanized: Rìji)) also known as Reggio di Calabria and often simply as Reggio, is the largest city in Calabria as well as the seat of the Metropolitan City of Reggio Calabria. As of 2026, with a population of 167,925, it is the 22nd most populous city in Italy, after Reggio Emilia. Reggio Calabria is located near the center of the Mediterranean and is known for its climate, and ethnic and cultural diversity. It is the third economic centre of mainland Southern Italy. About 511,935 people live in its metropolitan area.

Reggio is located on the "toe" of the Italian Peninsula and is separated from the island of Sicily by the Strait of Messina. It is situated on the slopes of the Aspromonte, a long, craggy mountain range that runs up through the centre of the region.

As a major functional pole in the region, it has strong historical, cultural and economic ties with the city of Messina, which lies across the strait in Sicily, forming a metro city of less than 1 million people.

Reggio is the oldest city in the region, and during ancient times, it was an important and flourishing colony of Magna Graecia. Reggio has a modern urban system, set up after the catastrophic earthquake of 1908, which destroyed most of the city. Before that seismic event, the region had been subject to several other previous earthquakes. The seismicity is caused by Reggio being on the Eurasian Plate near the faultline where it meets the African Plate that runs through the strait, dividing the two European regions of Calabria and Sicily into two different tectonic regions.

It is a major economic centre for regional services and transport on the southern shores of the Mediterranean. Reggio, with Naples and Taranto, is home to one of the most important archaeological museums, the National Archaeological Museum of Magna Græcia, dedicated to Ancient Greece (which houses the Bronzes of Riace, rare example of Greek bronze sculpture, which became one of the symbols of the city). Reggio is the seat, since 1907, of the Archeological Superintendence of Bruttium and Lucania. The city is home to football club Reggina, which previously played in the Italian top flight.

The city centre, consisting primarily of Liberty buildings, has a linear development along the coast with parallel streets, and the promenade is dotted with rare magnolias and exotic palms. Reggio has several commonly used nicknames: The "City of Bronzes", after the Bronzes of Riace that are testimonials of its Greek origins; the "City of bergamot", which is exclusively cultivated in the region; and the "City of Fatamorgana", an optical phenomenon visible in Italy only from the Reggio seaside.

== Etymology ==
During its 3,500-year history Reggio has often been renamed. Each name corresponds with the city's major historical phases:

- Erythra (Greek for 'red'), allegedly the name of the pre-Greek settlement.
- Rhegion (Ῥήγιον), the Greek city from the 8th to the 3rd centuries BC.
- Phoibeia (after Apollo), a short period under Dionysius II of Syracuse, in the 4th century BC.
- Regium or Rhegium, its first Latin name, during the 3rd and 2nd centuries BC.
- Rhegium Julii (Reggio Giulia), during the Roman Imperial period.
- Riyyu, Arabic name under the short domination by Emirate of Sicily, between 10th and 11th centuries.
- Rìsa, under the Normans, between the 11th and 12th centuries.
- Regols, Catalan name under the Crown of Aragon, in the late 13th century.
- Reggio or Regio, usual Italian name in the Middle and Modern age.
- Reggio di Calàbria, post Italian Unification (to be distinguished from Reggio di Lombardia or di Modena – located in northern Italy – which was renamed Reggio nell'Emilia).

The toponym of the city might derive from an Italic word rec (meaning 'king', cognate with Latin rex). Ancient Greek and Roman etymologists derived it from the Greek regnynai (ῥηγνυναι, 'break'), referring to a mythic earthquake in which Sicily was broken off from the Italian mainland.

== History ==
=== Ancient times ===
The history of the area before the arrival of the Greeks in the eighth century BC is not reliably known. Mythical accounts record a series of different peoples in the region, including the Osci (sometimes referred to as Opici), Trojans, Oenotrians, Ligures, Ausones, Mamertines, Taureani, Sicels, Morgetes and Itali. They also claim that the land around Reggio was first known as Saturnia, or Neptunia. The term 'Italia' initially referred to the area around Reggio itself, before expanding to cover present-day southern Calabria (later known as Bruttium), and finally becoming the name of the whole Italian peninsula around the third century BC. Allegedly, the name derives from king Italus, an Oenotrian king of the region.

After Cumae, Reggio was one of the first Greek colonies in southern Italy. The colony was settled by the inhabitants of Chalcis in 730 or 743 BC on the site of the older settlement, Erythra (Ερυθρά), meaning 'red'. The legendary founder of the city was King Iocastus, son of Aeolus, who was later said to be buried on the Punta Calamizzi promontory (called "Pallantion") and appeared on the city's coinage. The colony retained the name of "Rhegion" (Ῥήγιον). Pseudo-Scylax also writes that it was a Greek city.

Rhegion was one of the most important cities in Magna Graecia, reaching great economic and political power during the 5th and 6th centuries BC under Anaxilas, who reigned as tyrant from 494 to 476 BC. Anaxilas conquered Zancle (modern Messina), extending Rhegian control over both shores of the Straits of Messina. He attempted to conquer Locri as well in 477 BC but was rebuffed. When he died in 476 BC, his two sons were too young to rule, so power was held by their regent Micythus. Under his rule, Rhegion founded a colony, Pyxous (modern Policastro Bussentino) in Campania in 471 BC. Hieron I of Syracuse orchestrated Micythus' removal from power in 467 BC, after which Anaxilas' sons ruled on their own until they were deposed in 461 BC. During the Peloponnesian War, Rhegion allied with Athens. An Athenian inscription (IG I^{3} 53) reports a renewal of this alliance in 433 BC. The Athenians supported Rhegion in a war with Locri during the First Sicilian Expedition (427–425 BC). However, when the Athenians launched the much larger Sicilian Expedition of 415–413 BC, Rhegion offered them only limited assistance.

During the Third Sicilian War, Rhegion became hostile to Dionysius I of Syracuse. He attacked the city for the first time in 396 BC, but he was rebuffed. Dionysius destroyed the Rhegian navy in 389 BC, besieged the city again in 388 BC and, when it finally fell in 387 BC, destroyed it. His son, Dionysius II refounded the city as 'Phoebeia' in the 360s BC. When he was expelled from Syracuse in 356 BC, he retained control of Phoebeia, but it was captured by Syracusan forces led by Leptines and Callippus in 351 BC. Rhegion then reverted to its original name.

Throughout classical antiquity Rhegion remained an important maritime and commercial city as well as a cultural centre, as is demonstrated by the presence of academies of art, philosophy, and science, such as the Pythagorean School, and also by its well-known poet Ibycus, the historian Ippys, the musicologist Glaucus, and the sculptors Pythagoras and Clearchus.

Rhegion made an alliance with the Roman Republic in 282 BC, shortly before the Pyrrhic War. The Legio Campana, under the command of Decius Vibellus, was installed as a garrison but subsequently launched a violent coup and seized control of the city. Roman forces deposed Decius and restored the city's independence in 271 BC. Thereafter, Rhegium was an important ally of Rome, with the status of municipium and socia navalis (naval ally). It retained its Greek customs and language, as well as its mint. It was a central pivot for both maritime and mainland traffic, reached by the final part of the Via Popilia, which was built in the 2nd century BC and joined the older Via Appia at Capua, south of Rome. Close to Rhegion, on the Straits of Messina, was the busy port of Columna Rhegina. Under the Emperor Augustus, the city was renamed Rhegium Juli in honour of the emperor's adoptive father Julius Caesar and was the seat of the corrēctor (governor) of "Regio III Lucania et Bruttii" (the southernmost of the eleven regiones into which Italy was divided). In AD 61 the apostle St. Paul passed through Rhegium on his final voyage towards Rome, converting the first local Christians and, according to tradition, laying the foundations of the Christianization of Bruttium.

Rhegium boasted in imperial times nine thermal baths, one of which is still visible today on the sea-front. Due to its seismic activity, the area was often damaged by earthquakes, such as in 91 BC, AD 17, 305 and 374.

=== Middle Ages ===
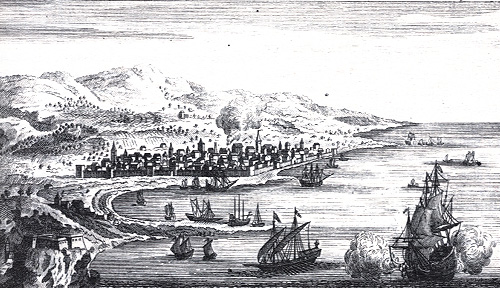
Reggio in a medieval engraving

Numerous occupying armies came to Reggio during the early Middle Ages due to the city's strategic importance.

Invasions by the Vandals, the Lombards and the Goths occurred in the 5th–6th centuries. Then, under Byzantine rule, it became a metropolis of the Byzantine possessions in Italy and was also the capital of the Duchy of Calabria several times between 536 and 1060 AD. Following wars between the Lombards and Byzantines in the 6th century, Bruttium was renamed Calabria.

As a Byzantine centre of culture, certain monks there undertook scribal work, carrying out the transcription of ancient classical works. Until the 15th century, Reggio was one of the most important Greek-rite Bishoprics in Italy—even today Greek words are used and are recognisable in local speech and Byzantine terms can be found in local liturgy, in religious icons and even in local recipes. During this period, constant migrations of Greeks fleeing the Slavic invasion of Peloponnese, further strengthened the Hellenic element of the city. During this period, the Byzantines decided to move the cultivation of mulberry trees and the breeding of silkworms from Syria (constantly under threat) to Reggio, which would later prove important for the economy of Reggio and for the entire empire.

The Arabs occupied Reggio in 918 and held some of its inhabitants to ransom or kept them prisoners as slaves. For brief periods in the 10th–11th centuries the city was ruled by the Arabs and, renamed Rivàh (or sometimes Rŷu), became part of the Emirate of Sicily. During the period of Arab rule various beneficial ideas were introduced into Calabria, such as citrus fruit trees, and several ways of cooking local vegetables such as aubergines. The Arabs introduced water ices and ice cream and also greatly improved agricultural and hydraulic techniques for irrigation.

In 1005, a Christian fleet coming from Pisa sacked the city and massacred all the Saracens to the great jubilation of the local population. The city was once again taken by the Byzantines, who made it the administrative center of southern Italy with the title of capital of the Duchy of Calabria, and Reggio became prosperous and very populous again.

In 1060, the Normans seized it permanently from the Eastern Roman Empire, gradually bringing it into the Latin cultural sphere under the influence of the Papacy, which sought to extend its power over the entire peninsula.

In 1122, hostilities arose between Roger II, Count of Sicily, and his cousin William II, the new Duke of Calabria, culminating in a conflict that was resolved only through the intervention of Pope Callixtus II. In 1121, the Pope succeeded in reconciling the two rivals by securing an agreement whereby the Count of Sicily would provide his cousin with a cavalry squadron to suppress the revolt led by Giordano, Count of Ariano. In exchange, William renounced his possessions in Sicily and Calabria. Roger II, already Prince of Salerno, then travelled to Reggio, where he was recognized as Duke of Calabria and Apulia, Count of Sicily, and sovereign over Amalfi and Gaeta, parts of Naples, as well as Taranto, Capua, and the Abruzzi. When Roger II was crowned King of Sicily in 1131, he transferred his seat from Reggio to Palermo, although Reggio remained the capital of the Justiciarate of Calabria. In 1234 the town fair was established by decree of King Frederick II. Following Norman rule, the city experienced the alternating dominion of the Angevin and the Aragonese, yet it consistently remained the capital and principal center of the Calabrian territories.

From 1266 it was ruled by the Angevins, under whom life in Calabria deteriorated because of their tendency to accumulate wealth in their capital, Naples, leaving Calabria in the power of local barons. In 1282, during the Sicilian Vespers, Reggio rallied in support of Messina and the other oriental Sicily cities because of the shared history, commercial and cultural interests. From 1147 to 1443 and again from 1465 to 1582, Reggio was the capital of the Calabrian Giustizierato. It supported the Aragonese forces against the House of Anjou. In the 14th century it obtained new administrative powers. In 1459, the Aragonese enlarged its medieval castle.

Reggio, throughout the Middle Ages, was first an important centre of calligraphy and then of printing after its invention. It boasts the first dated, printed edition of a Hebrew text, a Rashi commentary on the Pentateuch, printed in 1475 in La Giudecca of Reggio, even though scholars consider Rome as the city where Hebrew printing began. The Jewish community of Reggio was also considered to be among the foremost internationally, for the dyeing and the trading of silk: silk woven in Reggio was esteemed and bought by the Spaniards, the Genoese, the Dutch, the English and the Venetians, as it was recognised as the best silk in the Kingdom of Naples.

=== Early modern period ===
From the early 16th century, the Kingdom of Naples was under the Habsburgs of Spain, who put Reggio under a viceroy from 1504 to 1713. The 16th and 17th centuries were an age of decay due to high Spanish taxes, pestilence, the 1562 earthquake, and the Ottoman Turkish invasions suffered by Reggio between 1534 and 1594. In 1534, facing attack by an Ottoman fleet under Hayreddin Barbarossa, the townspeople abandoned Reggio. Barbarossa captured eight hundred of those who remained and then burned the town. After Barbary pirates attacked Reggio in 1558, they took most of its inhabitants as slaves to Tripoli.

In 1714, southern Italy became once more property of the Austrian Habsburgs, who remained until 1734, when they were replaced by the Bourbons of Spain. Reggio was the capital of Calabria Ulteriore Prima from 1759 to 1860. In 1783, a disastrous earthquake damaged Reggio, all of southern Calabria and Messina.

The precious citrus fruit, Bergamot orange, had been cultivated and used in the Reggio area since the 15th century. By 1750 it was being grown intensively in the Rada Giunchi area of Reggio and was the first plantation of its kind in the world.

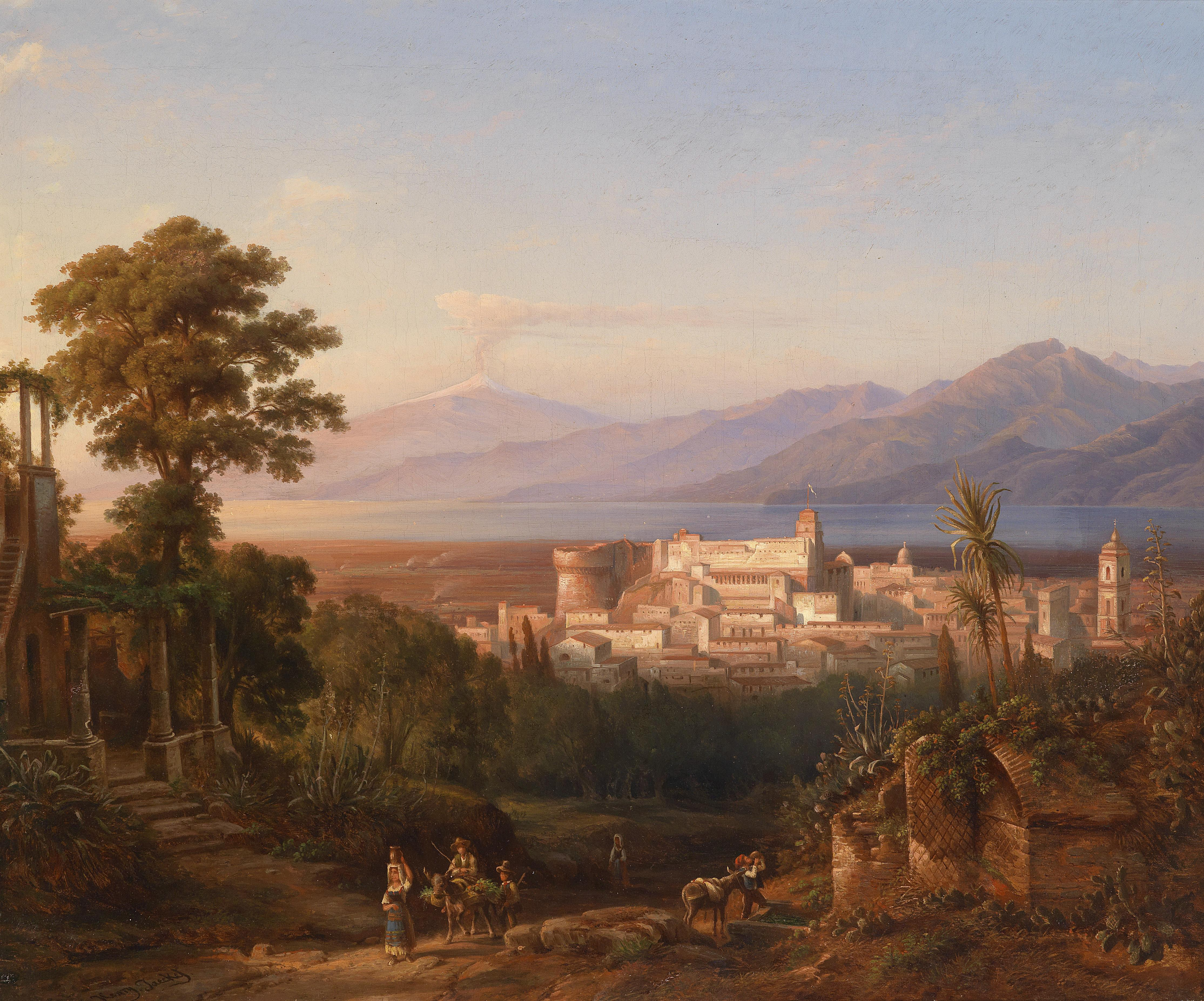
Reggio Calabria in 1853

In 1806, Napoleon Bonaparte took Reggio and made the city a Duchy and General Headquarters. After the former's fall, in 1816, the two ancient Kingdoms of Naples and of Sicily were unified, becoming the Kingdom of the Two Sicilies.

During the course of the 19th century new public gardens were laid out, the piazzas (or squares) were embellished and cafés and a theatre were opened. On the newly opened sea promenade a Civic Museum was inaugurated. In fact, some 60 years after the devastation caused by the 1783 earthquake, the English traveller and painter Edward Lear remarked "Reggio is indeed one vast garden, and doubtless one of the loveliest spots to be seen on earth. A half-ruined castle, beautiful in colour and picturesque in form, overlooks all the long city, the wide straits, and snow-topped Mongibello beyond."

=== Late modern and contemporary ===
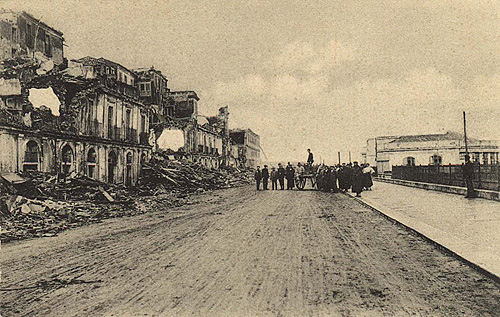
Effects of the 1908 earthquake

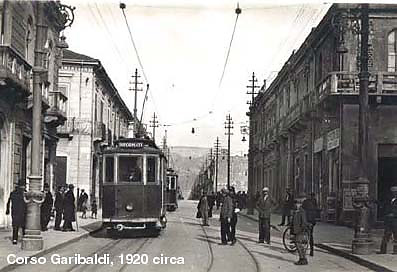
Reggio di Calabria in 1920

On 21 August 1860, during the Battaglia di Piazza Duomo (Cathedral Square Battle), Giuseppe Garibaldi conquered the Kingdom of the Two Sicilies. Bruno Antonio Rossi (the mayor of Reggio after the historian Domenico Spanò Bolani, who helped the citizenship during the previous turbulent years) was the first in the kingdom to proclaim the new Garibaldi Dictatorship and the end of the rule of Francis II.

On 28 December 1908, at 5:21 am, the town was hit by a heavy earthquake and shook violently for 31 seconds. Damage was even worse in Messina across the Straits. It is estimated that 25,000 people perished in Reggio and 65,000 in Messina. Reggio lost 27% of its inhabitants and Messina lost 42%. Ten minutes after the catastrophic earthquake, those who tried to escape by running towards the open spaces of the coast were engulfed by a 10-metre-high tsunami. Three waves of 6–12 metres swept away the whole waterfront. The 1908 Messina earthquake remains one of the worst on record in modern western European history.

During the World War II, due to its strategic military position, it suffered a devastating air raid and was used as the invasion target by the British Eighth Army in 1943, which led to the city's capture. After the war Reggio recovered considerably. During 1970–71 the city was the scene of a popular uprising—known as the Moti di Reggio—against the government choice of Catanzaro as capital of the newly instituted Region of Calabria. The revolt was taken over by young neofascists of the Italian Social Movement, backed by the 'Ndrangheta, a Mafia-type criminal organisation based in Calabria. The Reggio Calabria protests were the expression of malcontent about cronyism and the lack of industrial planning. In the 1970s and 1980s, Reggio went through twenty years of increasing organized crime by the 'Ndrangheta as well as urban decay. The town is home to several 'ndrine, such as the Condello-Imerti and the De Stefano-Tegano clans, who were involved in bloody wars against each other during this period. The 'Ndrangheta extorts protection money (pizzo) from every shop and viable business in town and has more power than the city council in awarding licences to retailers.

The spiral of corruption reached its zenith in the early 1990s. The sitting mayor at the time, Agatino Licandro, made a confession reporting "suitcases coming into city hall stuffed with money but going out empty". As a result of the nationwide corruption scandals most of the city council was arrested. Since the early 1990s, the so-called "Primavera di Reggio" (Reggio Spring)—a spontaneous movement of people and government institutions—encouraged city recovery and a renewed and stronger identity. The symbol of the Reggio Spring is the Lungomare Falcomatà, the sea-side boulevard named after Italo Falcomatà, the centre-left mayor who initiated the recovery of the town.

On 9 October 2012, the Italian government decided to dissolve the city council of Reggio Calabria for infiltration by the 'Ndrangheta. The move came after some councillors were suspected of having ties to the powerful crime syndicate, under the 10-year centre-right rule of Giuseppe Scopelliti, mayor from 2002 to 2010. His successor, the centre-right mayor Demetrio Arena and all 30 city councillors, were sacked to prevent any "mafia contagion" in the local government. It was the first time that the entire government of a provincial capital had been dismissed over suspected links to organized crime. Three commissioners ran the city for 18 months until a new election. According to anti-mafia investigators in 2016, Scopelliti was elected thanks to votes from the 'Ndrangheta.

=== Earthquakes in history ===
Reggio has been destroyed by earthquakes several times over the centuries, such as in 91 BC, after which the city was reconstructed by order of the Emperor Augustus, followed by another in the year 17 AD; yet another one in 305 AD, and again another in 374. In 1562 one destroyed the natural, medieval port of the city and brought about the submersion of the Calamizzi promontory, known in ancient times as the Pallantiòn, where, we are told, the first Greek settlers, the Calcidesi, had set foot. The particularly devastating of 1783 and that of 1908, which was the worst natural calamity to take place in Europe in human memory, both profoundly altered the urban aspect of the city, due to the successive re-building which gave the present-day layout of straight, intersecting roads, planned by Giovanbattista Mori in 1784 and by Pietro de Nava in 1911. But some town-planning policies at the time were decided upon with no respect for the architectural history of Reggio, as is shown by the demolition of the remaining Norman part of the Castle, following the last big earthquake in 1923.

=== European travellers who visited Reggio ===
Although Reggio and Calabria in general were less popular destinations than Sicily or Naples for the first Northern European travellers, several famous names such as the Flemish Pieter Bruegel (in c. 1550), the German Johann Hermann von Riedesel (in 1767), the Frenchmen Jean Claude Richard de Saint-Non (in 1778) and Stendhal (in 1817), the British travellers Henry Swinburne (in c. 1775), Richard Keppel Craven (in c. 1820), Craufurd Tait Ramage (in 1828), the Strutt family and Elizabeth Byron (in 1840), Edward Lear (in 1847), Norman Douglas (in 1911), D. H. Lawrence (in c. 1920) and Eric Whelpton (in 1950s) and the Belgian Jules Destrée (in 1915 and in 1930) visited Reggio.

== Geography ==
With an exceptionally high population density, Reggio Calabria was cited as having the least green space in a study of 386 European cities. The study reported that green space coverage varied markedly, averaging 18.6 per cent and "ranging from 1.9 (Reggio di Calabria, Italy) to 46 (Ferrol, Spain) per cent." The study further reported "Per capita green space provision varied by two orders of magnitude, from 3 to 4 m^{2} per person in Cádiz, Fuenlabrada and Almería (Spain) and Reggio di Calabria (Italy) to more than 300 m^{2} in Liège (Belgium), Oulu (Finland) and Valenciennes (France)." Even so, outside of the urban area, the nearby elevated areas have plenty of green space and extensive forests. This includes the Aspromonte National Park.

=== Climate ===
According to the Köppen climate classification, Reggio Calabria possesses a typical Mediterranean climate (Köppen: Csa). Its climate has warmer days and cooler nights than Messina which lies on the other side of the strait. Precipitation is another big difference since Messina receives approximately 300 mm (12 in) more.

Climate data for Reggio Calabria (1991–2020)
Month	Jan	Feb	Mar	Apr	May	Jun	Jul	Aug	Sep	Oct	Nov	Dec	Year
Record high °C (°F)	24.6 (76.3)	25.2 (77.4)	27.0 (80.6)	30.4 (86.7)	35.2 (95.4)	42.0 (107.6)	44.2 (111.6)	42.4 (108.3)	37.6 (99.7)	34.4 (93.9)	29.9 (85.8)	26.0 (78.8)	44.2 (111.6)
Mean daily maximum °C (°F)	14.9 (58.8)	15.1 (59.2)	16.9 (62.4)	19.4 (66.9)	23.5 (74.3)	27.8 (82.0)	30.8 (87.4)	31.1 (88.0)	27.4 (81.3)	23.9 (75.0)	19.8 (67.6)	16.2 (61.2)	22.2 (72.0)
Daily mean °C (°F)	11.8 (53.2)	11.7 (53.1)	13.3 (55.9)	15.6 (60.1)	19.3 (66.7)	23.5 (74.3)	26.3 (79.3)	26.7 (80.1)	23.2 (73.8)	20.0 (68.0)	16.3 (61.3)	13.1 (55.6)	18.4 (65.1)
Mean daily minimum °C (°F)	8.6 (47.5)	8.4 (47.1)	9.8 (49.6)	11.8 (53.2)	15.2 (59.4)	19.1 (66.4)	21.8 (71.2)	22.2 (72.0)	19.1 (66.4)	16.1 (61.0)	12.8 (55.0)	10.0 (50.0)	14.6 (58.2)
Record low °C (°F)	1.0 (33.8)	0.0 (32.0)	0.0 (32.0)	4.6 (40.3)	7.8 (46.0)	10.8 (51.4)	14.6 (58.3)	14.4 (57.9)	11.2 (52.2)	6.6 (43.9)	4.4 (39.9)	2.6 (36.7)	0.0 (32.0)
Average precipitation mm (inches)	69.6 (2.74)	61.5 (2.42)	50.7 (2.00)	40.4 (1.59)	19.8 (0.78)	10.9 (0.43)	7.0 (0.28)	11.9 (0.47)	47.5 (1.87)	72.5 (2.85)	81.7 (3.22)	73.3 (2.89)	546.8 (21.54)
Average precipitation days (≥ 1 mm)	9.3	9.1	7.5	6.6	2.8	1.5	1.3	1.9	4.4	7.0	8.7	8.3	68.4
Source 1: Istituto Superiore per la Protezione e la Ricerca Ambientale
Source 2: Servizio Meteorologico (precipitation 1971–2000)

== Demographics ==
Historical population
Year	Pop.	±%
1861	54,807	—
1871	62,613	+14.2%
1881	68,178	+8.9%
1901	77,761	+14.1%
1911	76,320	−1.9%
1921	98,221	+28.7%
1931	109,443	+11.4%
1936	119,804	+9.5%
1951	140,734	+17.5%
1961	153,380	+9.0%
1971	165,822	+8.1%
1981	173,486	+4.6%
1991	177,580	+2.4%
2001	180,353	+1.6%
2011	180,817	+0.3%
2021	172,479	−4.6%
Source: ISTAT

As of 2026, the population is 167,925, of which 48.0% are males, and 52.0% are females. Minors make up 15.0% of the population, and seniors make up 25.3%.

=== Immigration ===
As of 2025, immigrants make up 8.5% of the population. The 5 largest foreign countries of birth are Morocco, Romania, India, the Philippines, and Ukraine.

Foreign-born population (2025)
Country of birth	Population
Morocco	2,174
Romania	2,129
India	1,123
Philippines	1,120
Ukraine	922
Georgia	851
Poland	458
France	395
Argentina	365
Brazil	271
Nigeria	257
Russia	256
Moldova	242
Switzerland	221
Germany	214

== Administrative divisions ==
The municipality of Reggio is divided into 15 sub-municipalities (circoscrizioni) containing the frazioni ('subdivisions', mainly villages and hamlets) of Catona, Gallico, Archi, Pentimele, Gallina, Mosorrofa (Greek: Messorofè), Ortì (Greek: Orthioi), Pellaro (Greek: Pèllaros) and Saracinello.

Circoscrizione	Population (2021)	Area (km²)	Density
Archi	5,931	8.63	687.3
Cannavò-Mosorrofa-Cataforio	5,718	45.61	125.4
Catona-Salice-Rosalì-Villa San Giuseppe	10,731	16.20	662.4
Centro Storico	13,368	1.47	9,093.9
Ferrovieri-Stadio-Gebbione	17,128	2.21	7,750.2
Gallico-Sambatello	9,802	15.22	644.0
Gallina	7,282	23.68	307.5
Ortì-Podargoni-Terreti	2,020	61.83	32.7
Pellaro	12,407	25.06	495.1
Pineta Zerbi-Tremulini-Eremo	14,118	2.53	5,580.2
Ravagnese	15,220	20.99	725.1
San Giorgio-Modena-San Sperato	14,707	2.81	5,233.8
Santa Caterina-San Brunello Vito	10,242	5.74	1,784.3
Sbarre	17,088	1.79	9,546.4
Trabocchetto-Condera-Spirito Santo	16,717	5.27	3,172.1

== Politics ==
The members of Parliament representing Reggio Calabria are Federica Dieni (M5S) in the Chamber and Marco Siclari (FI) in the Senate.

== Sights ==
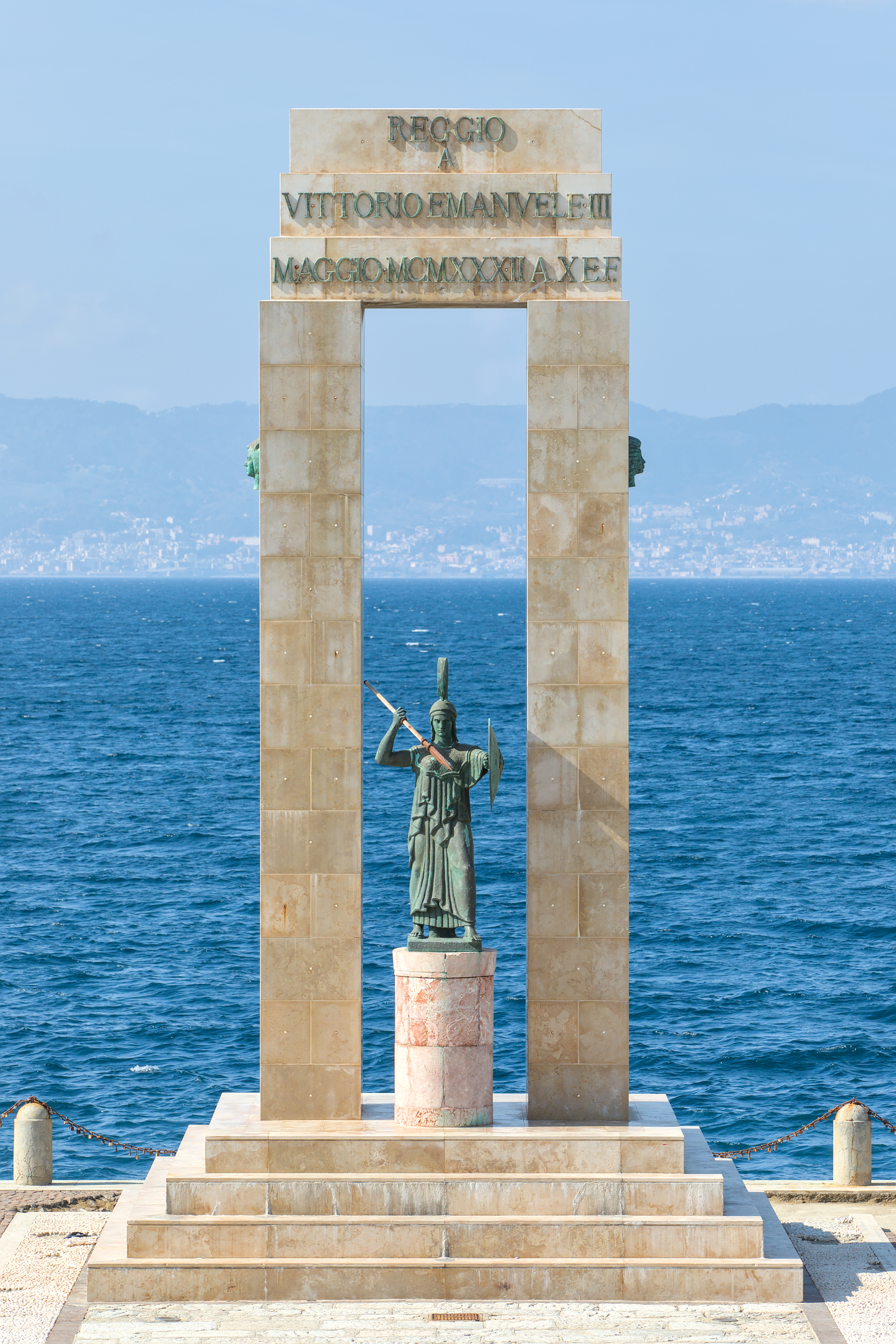
Monument to Victor Emmanuel III

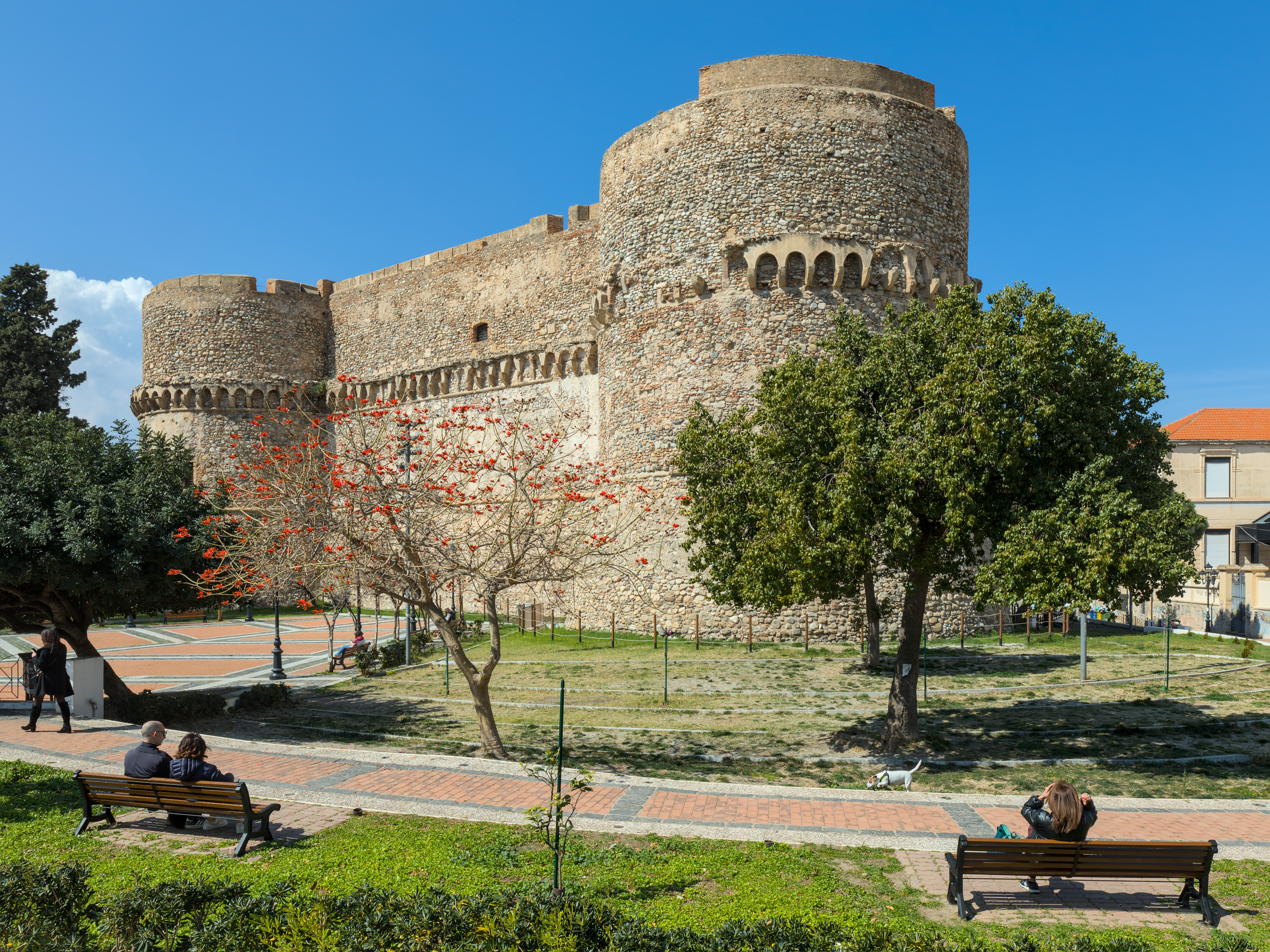
Castle

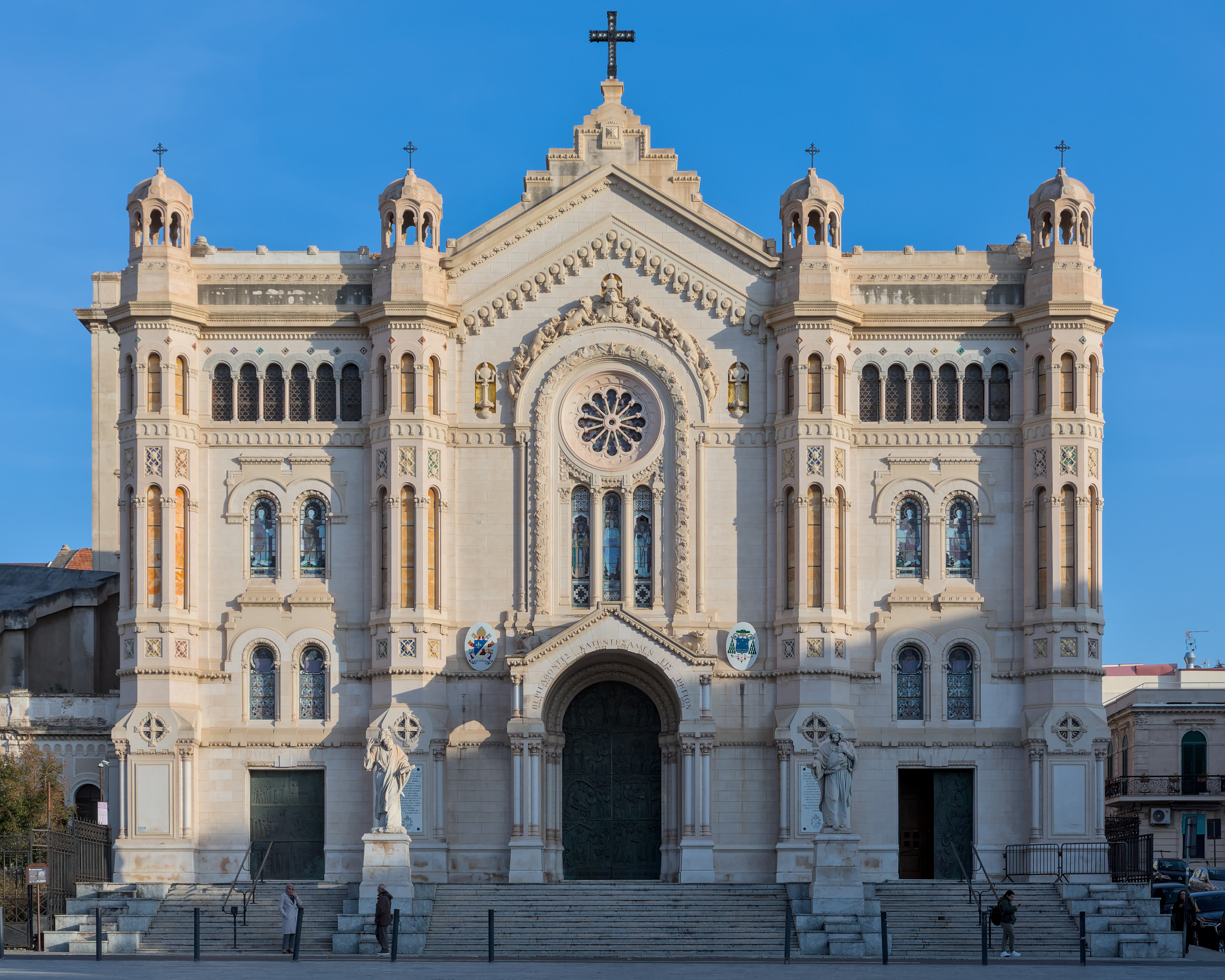
Cathedral

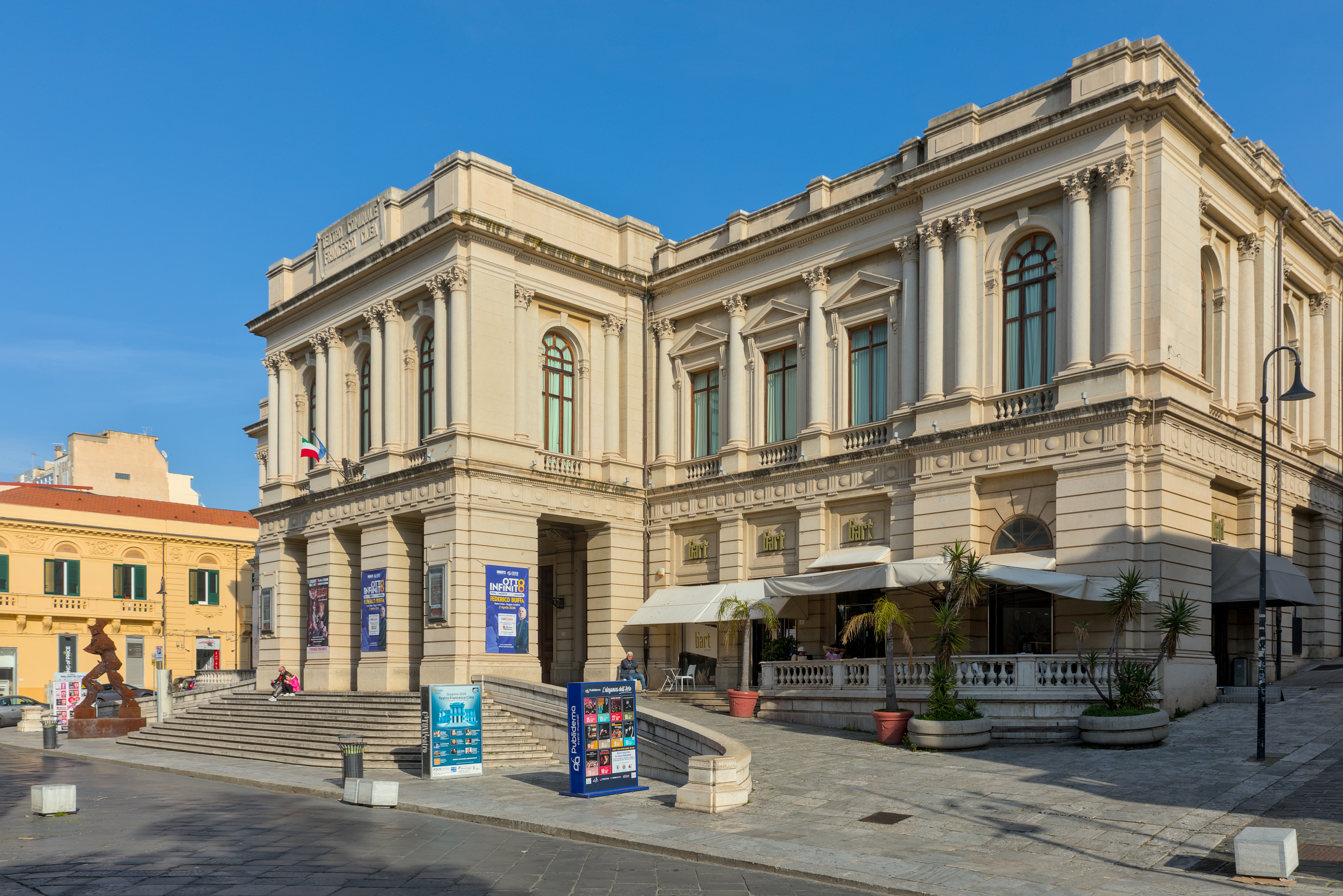
Cilea Theatre

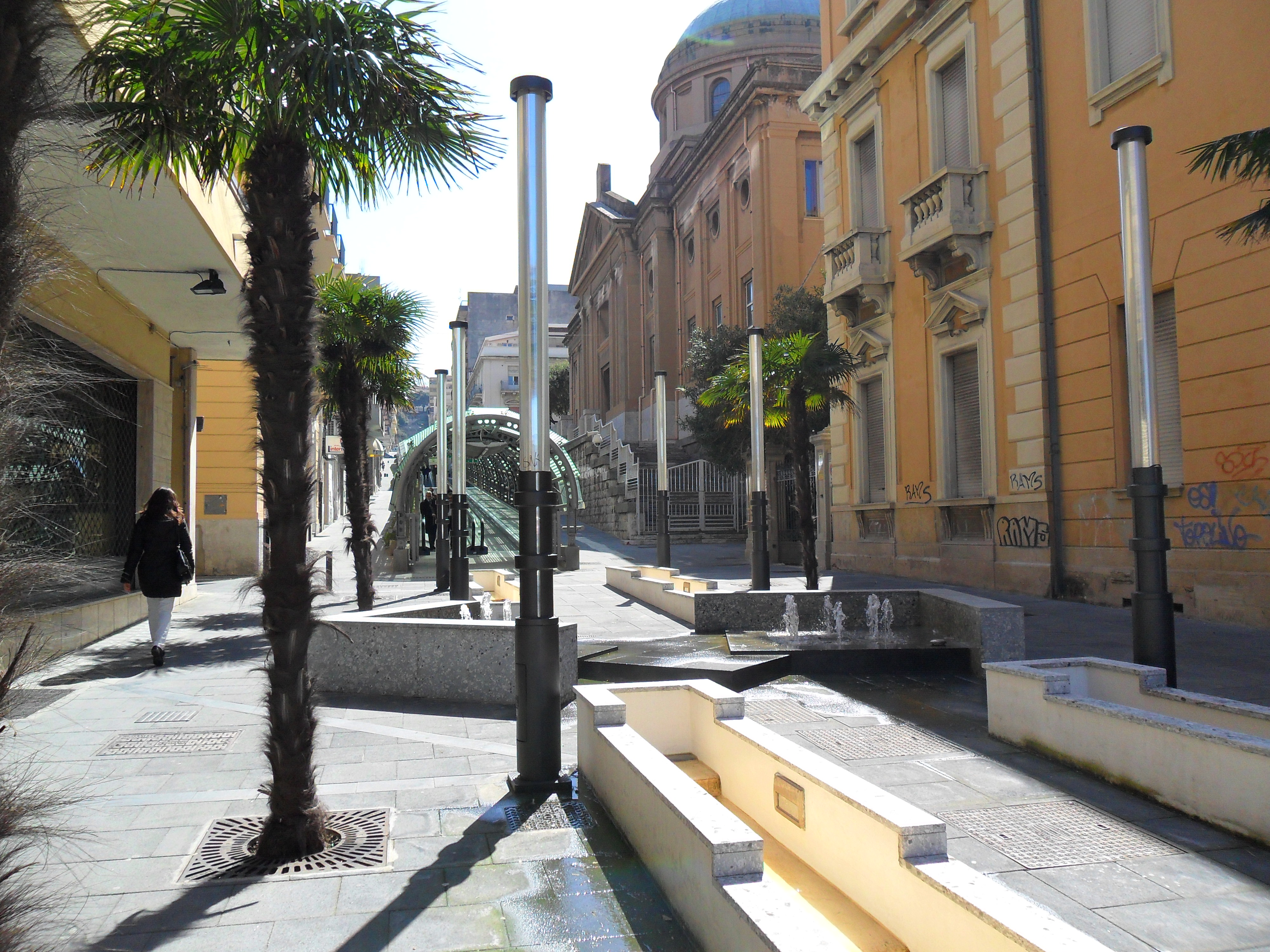
Giudecca Street

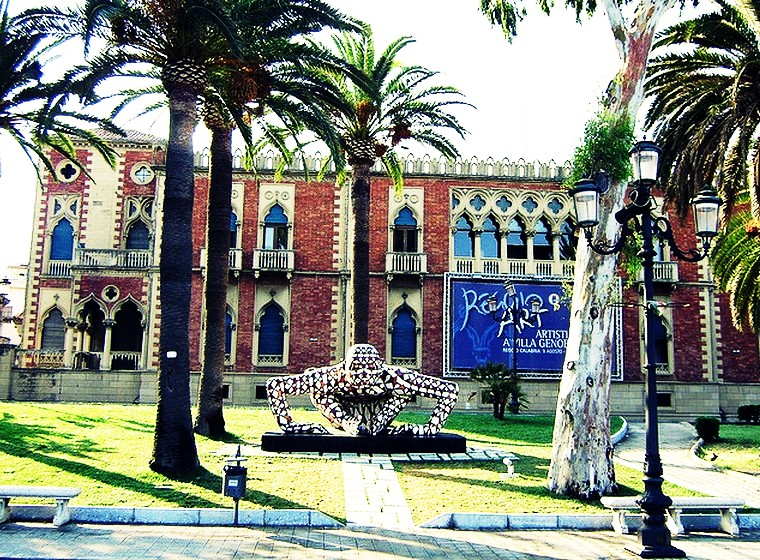
Villa Genoese-Zerbi

=== Castles, churches and cathedrals ===
- The Castle, originally built before 540 AD and enlarged by the Normans and later by the Aragonese in 1459, partially torn in the late 19th century and in 1923, is now home to art exhibitions.
- The Cathedral of Reggio, re-built after the 1908 Messina earthquake.
- The Church of Saint Gaetano Catanoso, in the Spirito Santo neighborhood. It houses the namesake saint's glass tomb, in the sanctuary as well as museum exhibits.
- The Church of the Optimates constructed in Byzantine-Norman style, containing medieval artistic items of interest.

=== Museums, palaces and theatres ===
- The Museo Nazionale della Magna Grecia (National Archaeological Museum of Magna Grecia), dedicated to Ancient Greece, heir of the previous City Museum (created in 1819); its building was built in 1932 with project of Marcello Piacentini under the auspices of Archæological Superintendent Edoardo Galli.
- The Villa Genoese-Zerbi is a modern villa in 14th century Venetian style (Neo-Gothic). It is the seat of exhibition of the Venice Biennale in southern Italy.
- The Palazzo Nesci is a mansion in Neoclassical style; it is one of the few 19th-century buildings survived to the 1908 earthquake.
- The Pinacoteca Comunale ("Town Art Gallery") houses works by Antonello da Messina (Abraham Served by the Angels and St. Jerome in Penitence), Mattia Preti, Luca Giordano, Giuseppe Benessai and others.
- The Piccolo Museo San Paolo, a museum with a collection of medieval Byzantine and Russian artistic items.

=== Archaeological sites and natural sites ===
- Soprintendenza alle Antichità della Calabria, established in 1907 as Archeological Superintendence of Bruttium and Lucania.
- The Riace bronzes, that can be seen at the important National Museum of Greater Greece, are some of the main touristic destinations in Reggio.
- The Lungomare Falcomatà, a seaside promenade located in the downtown, is a swimming destination and main symbol of the summer movida; it was defined by Nando Martellini, quoting the poet Gabriele D'Annunzio, as "the most beautiful kilometre of Italy".
- The botanic gardens facing the sea.
- The walls of the ancient city, one of the few remaining examples of the original Greek walls, are divided into four separate sections. The one at the Falcomatà Seaside dates to the 5th–4th century BC and is attributed to the city's reconstruction by Dionysius II of Syracuse.
- The remains of Roman baths, along the sea promenade.
- The archaeological excavations of Piazza Italia, which was the central square of Reggio since Greater Greece age until today.
- The archaeological site of Griso Laboccetta, an ancient Greek and Roman sacred area.
- The archaeological excavations nearby Church San Giorgio al Corso.
- Other sites of archæological interest in the upper-eastern part of the city, such as a Greek mansion, a necropolis, or some ancient Greek walls and Byzantine items of interest nearby Reggio Campi street.

=== New waterfront: Museum and Performing Arts Centre ===
The new waterfront, designed by architect Zaha Hadid, is located on a narrow strait separating Italy from Sicily. The museum (13,400 m^{2}) draws inspiration from the organic form of the starfish, utilizing a radial symmetry to coordinate communication and circulation between different program elements: exhibition spaces, restoration facilities, archive, aquarium and library. A second, multifunctional building (8,000 m^{2}), comprises two separate elements, placed around a partially covered piazza. It houses offices, gyms, craft laboratories, cinema and flexible auditoria.

== Culture ==
=== Literature and theatre ===
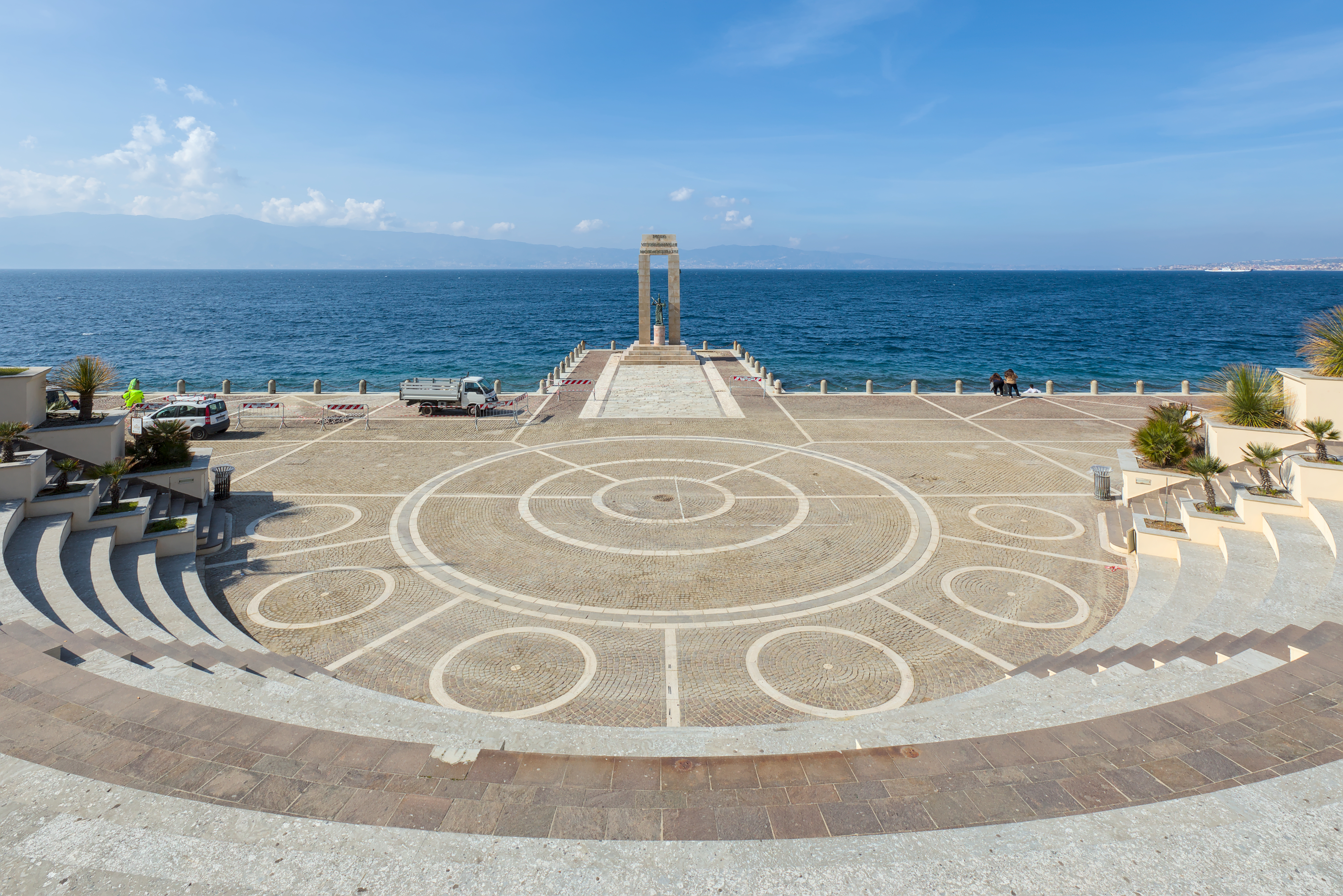
Arena dello Stretto hosts musical and theatrical events.

- Teatro Comunale "Francesco Cilea": Municipal Theatre, firstly inaugurated in 1818 as Real Teatro Borbonio, it was rebuilt in a different place after the 1908 earthquake.
- Politeama "Siracusa": multi-purpose theatre inaugurated in 1922 inside a Liberty style building.
- Biblioteca Comunale "Pietro De Nava": the Municipal Library was inaugurated in 1818 as Regia Biblioteca Ferdinandiana and set in its present-day building in 1928, after the last earthquake.

=== Sport ===
The city's main association football team is Reggina. They play at the Stadio Oreste Granillo and are fierce rivals with neighbours Messina, who are just a twenty-five minutes ferry ride apart from each other. Throughout their histories they have clashed in the Derby dello Stretto (Strait of Messina Derby). There is also a major Calabrian derby with Crotone. There is also a second much smaller team HinterReggio Calcio.

== Economy ==
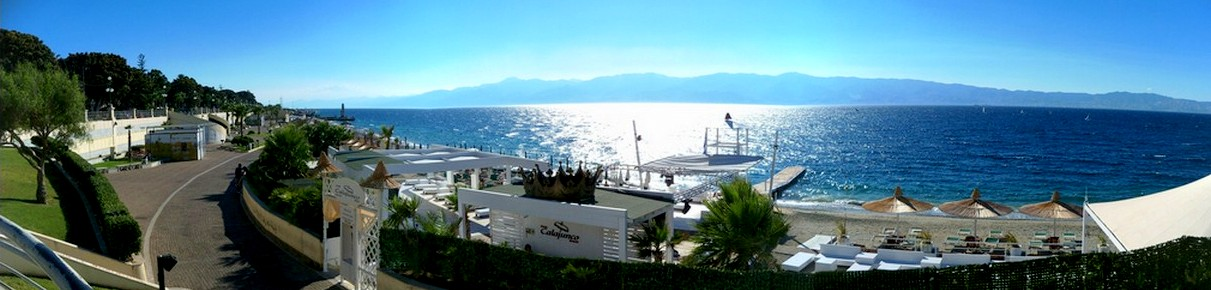
View on the Strait of Messina by the beach of Reggio Calabria

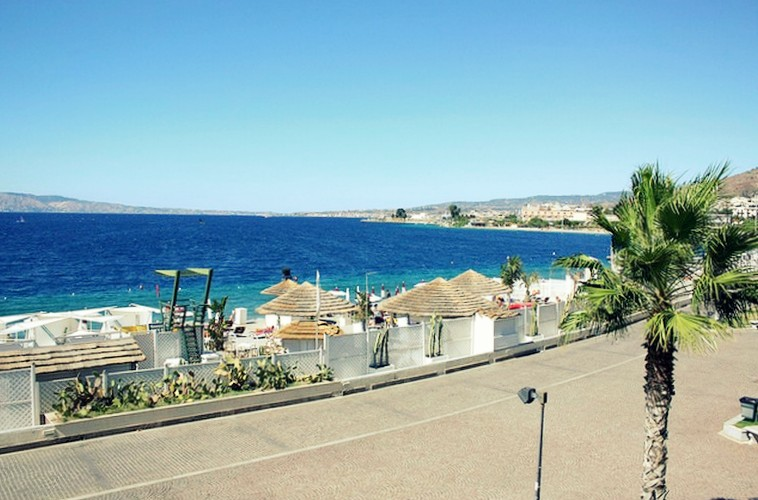
Bathing establishments along the beach

Reggio retains a somewhat rural ambience despite its sizable population. Industry in the city revolves primarily around agriculture and export, fruits, tobacco, briar and the precious essence of the bergamot which is used in perfume production. Reggio is a port city with a sizeable fishing industry.

The beaches of the city have become a popular tourist destination. Tourism is distributed between the Ionian coast (Costa Jonica), the Tyrrhenian coast (the Costa Viola, Purple Coast) and the Aspromonte mountain behind the city, containing the natural reserve of the Aspromonte National Park where, at 1,300–1,950 metres above sea level, there is a panoramic view of the Strait of Messina from the snowy Mount Etna to the Aeolian Islands.

== Transport ==
=== Highway ===
Reggio is a road junction on the SS18 Naples–Reggio and on the SS106 Reggio–Taranto roads and also on the A2 Salerno–Reggio motorway.

=== Tramway ===
The Tramway of Reggio was operative since 1918 until 1937. Tramway line was 5.3 km long, from Sbarre district (southern suburbs) until Annunziata bridge (northern part of town centre) passing by the whole historical centre.

=== Railway ===
It has an important main central railway station, the largest in Calabria, opened in 1866, with ten smaller stations.

=== Port ===
The Port of Reggio was enlarged after the 1908 earthquake. It is directly connected to the city of Messina through a ferryboat line system.

=== Airport ===
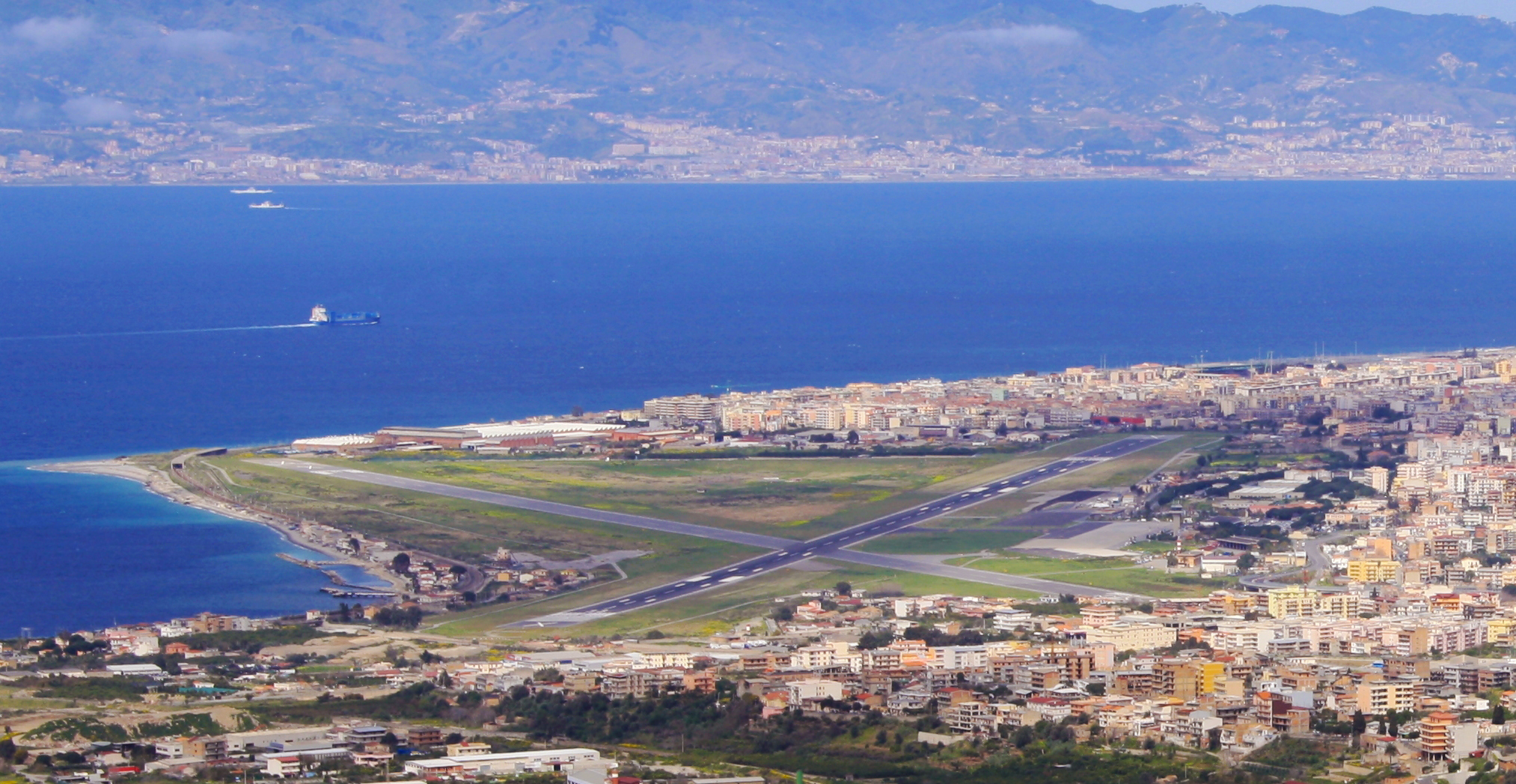
View of Reggio Calabria Airport

Reggio Calabria, served by air from the Reggio Calabria Airport (IATA: REG, ICAO: LICR) also known as Aeroporto dello Stretto or Tito Minniti Airport, is located a few kilometres south of Reggio. The airport has been at the center of polemics about its financial loss, risking to be closed. It is currently connected to the airports of Rome Fiumicino and Milan Linate.

== Education ==
- Università "Mediterranea": established in 1968, it is the first Calabrian university.
- Università per Stranieri "Dante Alighieri": it is one of the three Italian Universities for Foreigners; created in 1984 it includes several Linguistic and Philology courses.
- Accademia di Belle Arti: the Academy of Fine Arts, established in 1967 is the most long-standing of its kind in Calabria and the third one in Southern Italy.
- Conservatorio Musicale "Francesco Cilea": founded in 1927, the most ancient Conservatory of Music in Calabria, was then dedicated to the musician from Palmi.
- State High School "Thomas Gulli", (Liceo statale Tommaso Gulli) established in 1911 as Girls Private School.
- Liceo Classico "Tommaso Campanella", established in 1814 as Real Collegio under Joachim Murat government; poet Diego Vitrioli, from Reggio, attended this college.
- Liceo Scientifico "Leonardo da Vinci", founded in the 1920s, under Fascism.
- Liceo Scientifico "Alessandro Volta".
- Istituto Tecnico-Industriale "Panella-Vallauri".

== Notable people ==
- Learchus (end of 15th century BC), sculptor
- Iokastos (beginning of 13th century BC), probably king of Reggio
- Clearchus (7th–6th century BC), sculptor
- Ibycus (6th century BC), poet
- Theagenes of Rhegium (6th century BC), literary critic
- Pythagoras (6th–5th century BC), sculptor born in Samos
- Lycus of Rhegium, also known as Boutheras, was a historian who wrote a history of Libya and Sicily. Father of Lycophron.
- Elicaon or Helicaon (Ἑλικάων) of Rhegium, a Pythagorean philosopher
- Proclus of Rhegium (1st–2nd century AD), physician
- Agatho (7th century AD), pope born in Sicily
- Barlaam of Seminara (1290–1348), Byzantine thinker
- Tommaso Campanella (1568–1639), philosopher, theologian, astrologer, writer and poet born in Stilo
- Raffaele Piria (1814–1865), chemist born in Scilla
- Domenico Spanò Bolani (1815–1890), politician, historian and author
- Francesco Cilea (1866–1950), musician and composer born in Palmi
- Gaetano Catanoso (1879–1963), saint, priest born in Choriò
- Umberto Boccioni (1882–1916), painter/sculptor
- Domingo Periconi (1883–1940), painter
- Goffredo Zehender (1901–1958), Grand Prix driver
- Tito Minniti (1909–1935), pilot
- Leopoldo Trieste (1917–2003), actor and movie director
- Diego Carpitella (1924–1990), ethno-musicologist
- Nik Spatari (1929–2020), painter, sculptor, architect and art scholar born in Mammola
- Luigi Malice (born 1937), painter and sculptor born in Naples
- Marina Ripa di Meana (1941–2018), writer, actress, director, stylist and activist born Maria Elide Punturieri
- Italo Falcomatà (1943–2001), politician and university teacher
- Mino Reitano (1944–2009), singer born in Fiumara
- Santo Versace (born 1944), fashion designer and politician
- Mia Martini (1947–1995), singer born in Bagnara Calabra
- Gianni Versace (1946–1997), fashion designer
- Antonio Strati (born 1949), organisational theorist, artist and university teacher
- Loredana Bertè (born 1950), singer born in Bagnara Calabra
- Nicola Calipari (1953–2005), mayor general and military intelligence officer
- Nuccio Schepis (born 1955), sculptor and art restorer
- Donatella Versace (born 1955), fashion designer
- Marco Minniti (born 1956), politician and former Minister of the Interior in Italy
- Giuseppe Filianoti (born 1974), operatic tenor
- Michele Morrone (born 1990), actor, fashion designer, model, singer, songwriter
- Mimmo Candito (1941–2018), journalist, reporter, writer
- Paul N. Luvera Sr. (1898–1990), Washington State Senator

== International relations ==
=== Twin towns – sister cities ===
Reggio di Calabria is twinned with:

- Patras, Greece
- Athens, Greece, since 2003
- Egaleo, Greece, since 2004
- Cesana Torinese, Italy, since 2006
- San Diego, United States, since 1973
- Montesilvano, Italy, since 2009
- Fairfield City, Australia

== See also ==
- Black-figure pottery
- Fatti di Reggio
- List of mayors of Reggio Calabria
- Museo della 'ndrangheta
- Roman Catholic Archdiocese of Reggio-Bova
- Urbs Reggina 1914
- Chiesa di Gesù e Maria, Reggio Calabria
- Chiesa degli Ottimati
