= Italian architecture =

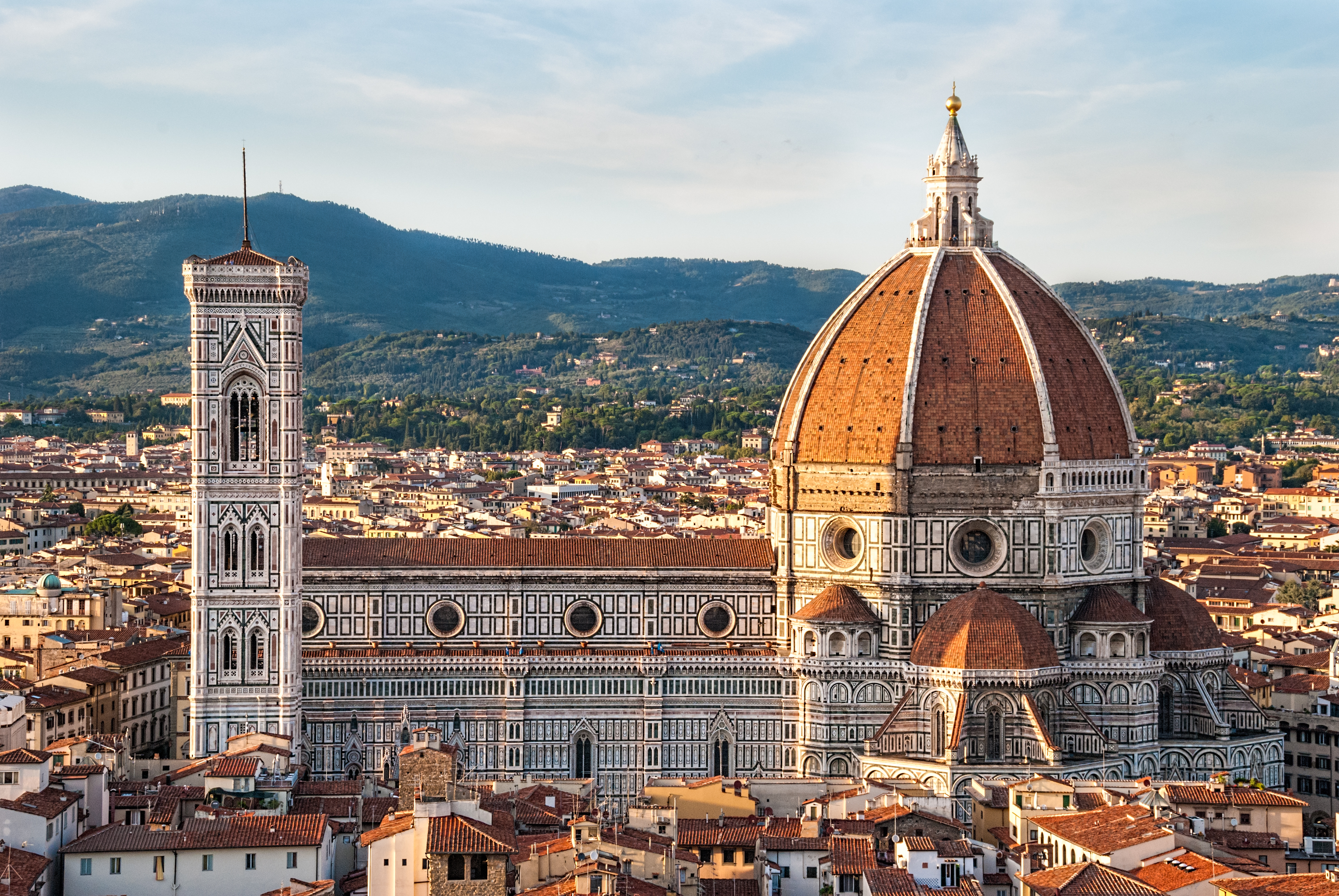
The Santa Maria del Fiore cathedral in Florence by Filippo Brunelleschi, which has the largest brick dome in the world, and is considered a masterpiece of world architecture

Italy has a broad and diverse architectural style, which cannot be classified by period or region, due to Italy's division into various small states until 1861. This has created a diverse and eclectic range in architectural designs. Italy is known for its considerable architectural achievements, such as the construction of aqueducts, temples and similar structures during ancient Rome, the founding of the Renaissance architectural movement in the late-14th to 16th century, and being the homeland of Palladianism, a style of construction which inspired movements such as that of Neoclassical architecture, and influenced the designs which noblemen built their country houses all over the world, notably in the United Kingdom, Australia and the United States of America during the late-17th to early 20th centuries.

Several of the finest works in Western architecture, such as the Colosseum, the Duomo of Milan, the Mole Antonelliana in Turin, Florence Cathedral and the building designs of Venice are found in Italy. Italy has an estimated total of 100,000 monuments of all varieties (museums, palaces, buildings, statues, churches, art galleries, villas, fountains, historic houses and archaeological remains). Now Italy is in the forefront of modernist and sustainable design with architects like Renzo Piano and Carlo Mollino.

Italian architecture has also widely influenced the architecture of the world. Moreover, Italianate architecture, popular abroad since the 19th century, was used to describe foreign architecture which was built in an Italian style, especially modelled on Renaissance architecture.

== Magna Graecia and the Etruscans ==
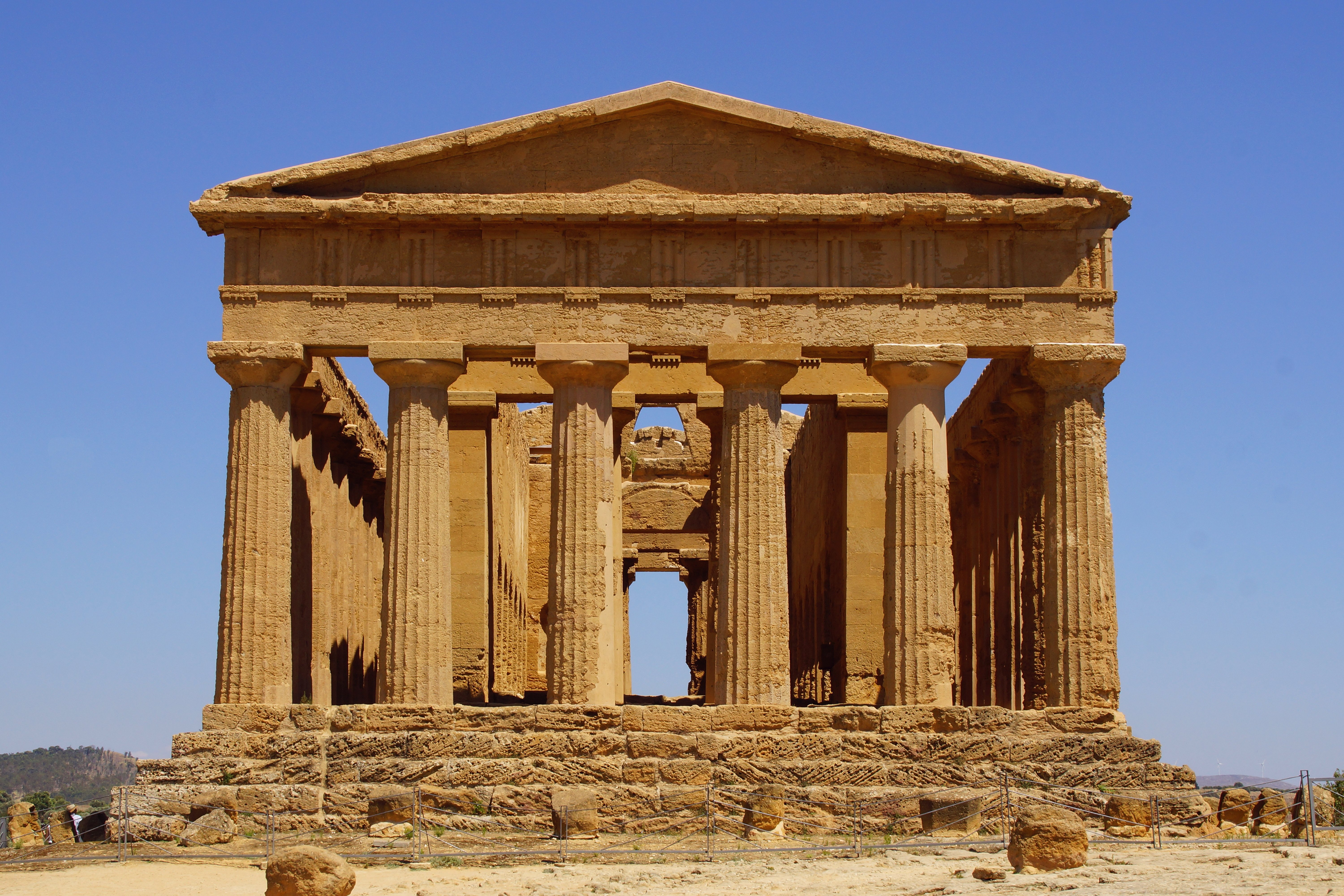
The Greek Temple of Concordia in the Valle dei Templi, Sicily

Along with pre-historic architecture, the first people in Italy to truly begin a sequence of designs were the Greeks and the Etruscans. In Northern and Central Italy, it was the Etruscans who led the way in architecture in that time. Etruscan buildings were made from brick and wood, thus few Etruscan architectural sites are now in evidence in Italy, with the exception of a few in Volterra, Tuscany and Perugia, Umbria. The Etruscans built temples, fora, public streets, aqueducts and city gates which had a significant influence on Roman architecture.

In Southern Italy, from the 8th century BC, the Greek colonists who created what was known as Magna Graecia used to build their buildings in their own style. They built bigger, better and technologically advanced houses which influenced Roman architecture too. Yet, by the 4th century BC, the Hellenistic Age, less concentration was put on constructing temples, rather more time was spent building theatres. The theatres were semi-circular and had an auditorium and a stage. They used to be built only on hills, unlike the Romans who would artificially construct the audience's seats.

The Greek temples were known for containing bulky stone or marble pillars. Today, there are several remains of Greek architecture in Italy, notably in Calabria, Apulia, and Sicily. The temples in the Valle dei Templi, which are currently UNESCO World Heritage Sites, are a fine example.

== Ancient Rome ==
The Colosseum in Rome

Influenced by Greek architecture (which had left important signs in Magna Grecia, in the temples of Agrigento, Selinunte and Paestum) and by the Etruscan architecture (which aroused the attentions of Vitruvius), Roman architecture assumed its own characteristics.

The Romans absorbed Greek influence, apparent in many aspects closely related to architecture; for example, this can be seen in the introduction and use of the triclinium in Roman villas as a place and manner of dining. The Romans, similarly, were indebted to their Etruscan neighbours who supplied them with a wealth of knowledge essential for future architectural solutions such as hydraulics and in the construction of arches.

Social elements such as wealth and high population densities in cities forced the ancient Romans to discover new (architectural) solutions of their own. The use of vaults and arches, together with a sound knowledge of building materials, enabled them to achieve unprecedented successes in the construction of imposing structures for public use. Prominent examples include the aqueducts of Rome, the Baths of Diocletian, and the Colosseum. These were reproduced at smaller scale in major towns and cities throughout the Empire, with some structures surviving almost completely intact, such as the town walls of Lugo in Hispania Tarraconensis.

== Early Christian ==
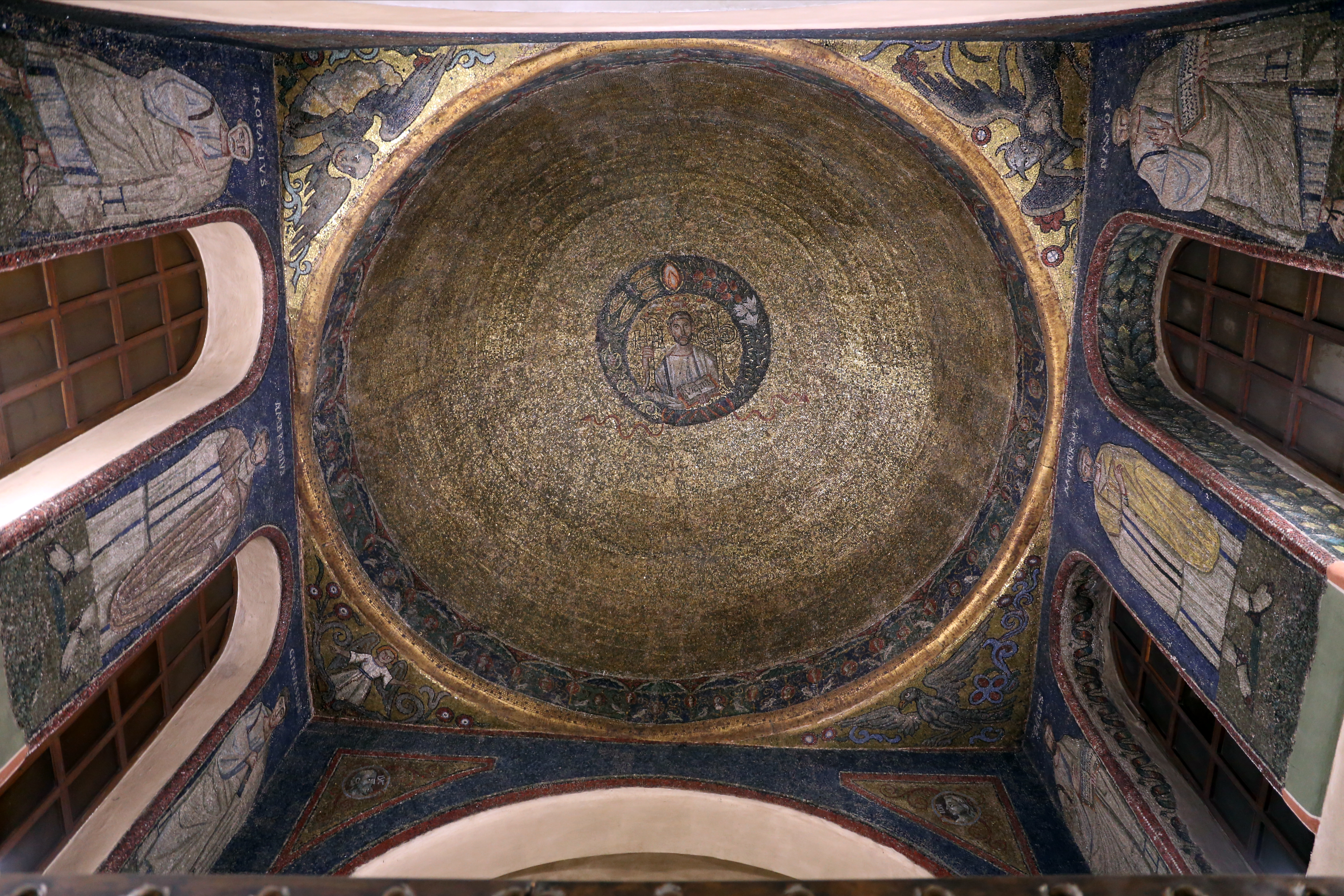
The sacellum or chapel of San Vittore in ciel d'oro is an Early Christian chapel located inside the basilica of Sant'Ambrogio in Milan.

Italy was widely affected by the Early Christian age, with Rome being the new seat of the pope. After the Justinian reconquest of Italy, several buildings, palaces and churches were built in the Roman-Byzantine style. The Christian concept of basilica was invented in Rome. They were known for being long, rectangular buildings, which were built in an almost ancient Roman style, often rich in mosaics and decorations. The early Christians' art and architecture was also widely inspired by that of the pagan Romans; statues, mosaics and paintings decorated all their churches. Late-Christian frescos can be easily seen in some of the many catacombs in Rome.

Early Christian churches in Milan are the first churches built immediately after the Edict of Milan (Edictum Mediolanense) in February 313, issued by Constantine the Great and Licinius, which granted tolerance and religious liberty to Christianity within the Roman Empire. The early Christian basilicas in Mediolanum (now Milan) can be divided into several categories, corresponding to their periods. The first basilicas we know are divided into two separate churches, one for the baptized, being the sacrament of baptism at that time granted only upon completion of a process of conversion and spiritual purification, and the other for catechumens. This particular arrangement perhaps derived from horrea, a type of public warehouse used during the ancient Roman period, such as the ancient buildings of Aquileia. The Basilica di Santa Tecla (45°27′50″N 45°27′50″E), whose ruins can be visited under the Milan Cathedral, has apse of traditional type, reminiscent of those of the churches annexed to great civic buildings. The religious center of the city, now Piazza del Duomo, included two cathedrals: the basilica vetus or basilica minor, used during the winter season, and basilica nova or basilica major, used during the summer. With the Roman governor and bishop Ambrose began a program to build basilicas dedicated to various categories: a basilica for the prophets, one for the apostles (San Nazaro in Brolo), one for the martyrs (martyrium, which later housed his remains and became the Basilica of Sant'Ambrogio), one for the virgins (Basilica of San Simpliciano).

== Byzantine architecture ==
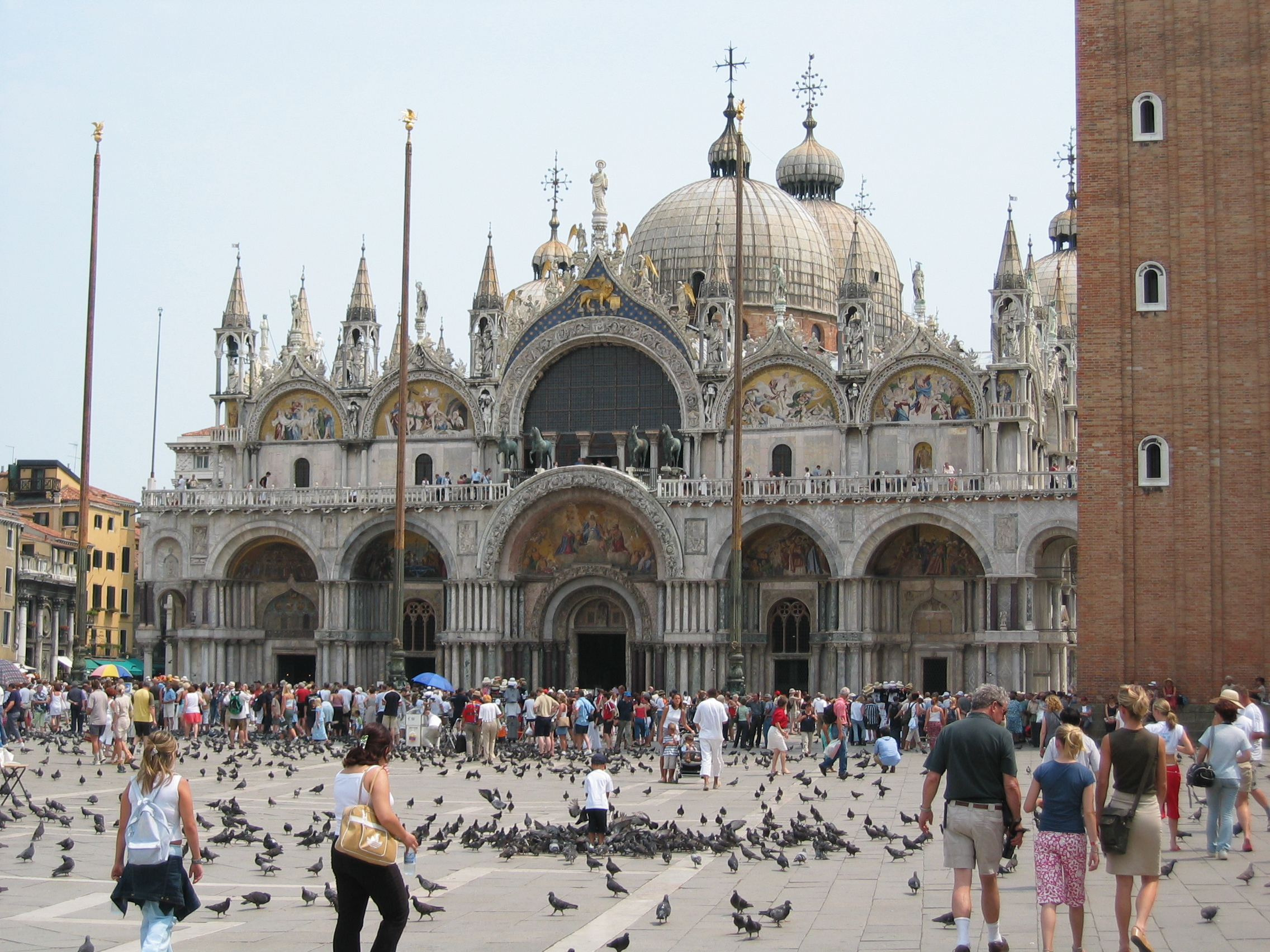
St Mark's Basilica, one of the best known examples of Italo-Byzantine architecture

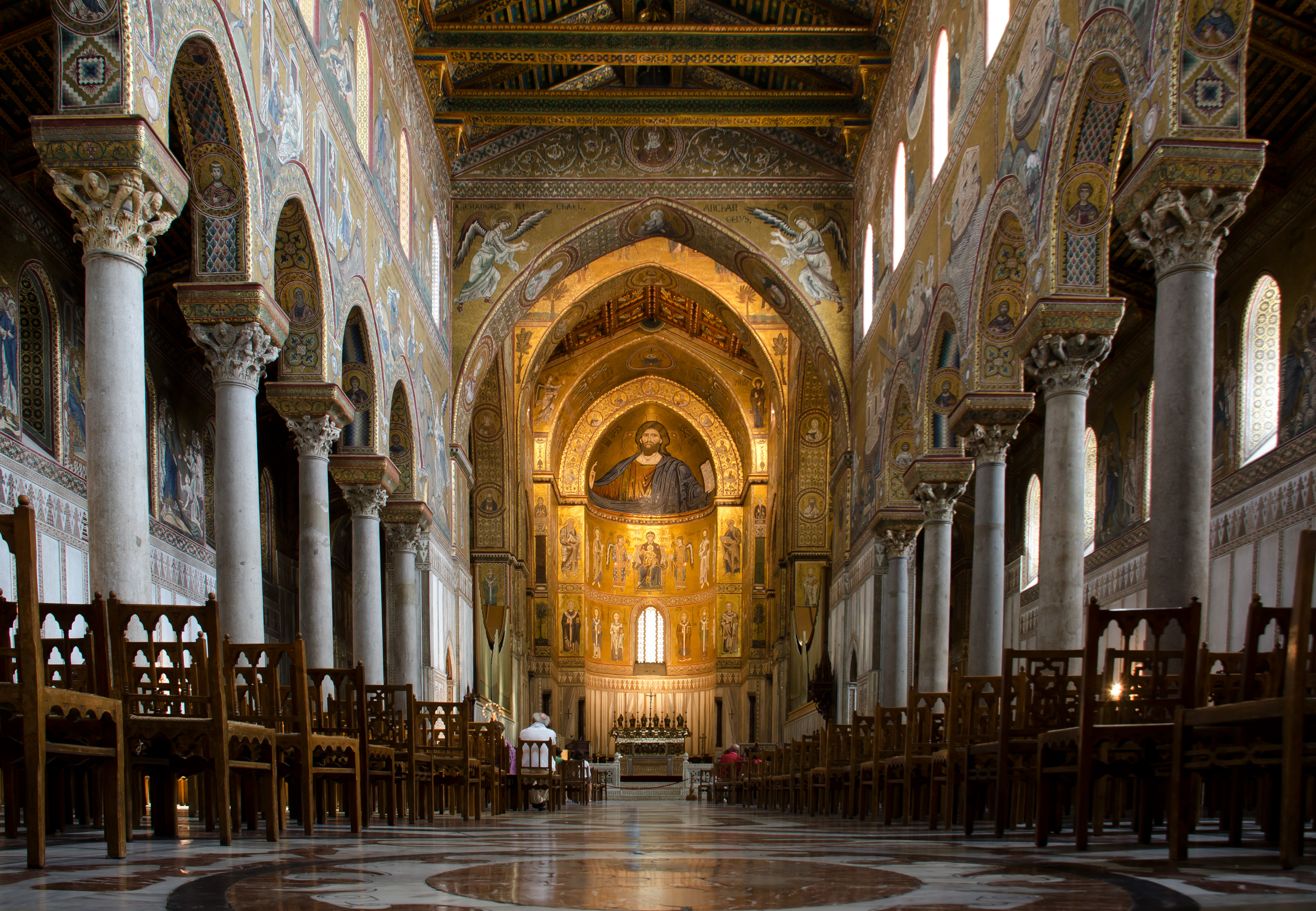
The lavish mosaics in the interior of the Monreale Cathedral, Sicily

Byzantine architecture was also widely diffused in Italy. When the Western Roman Empire fell in 476 AD, the Byzantines were the leaders in the world regarding aspects of culture, arts, music, literature, fashion, science, technology, business and architecture. The Byzantines, which technically were the people of the Eastern Roman Empire, kept Roman principles of architecture and art alive, yet gave it a more Eastern twist, and were famous for their slightly flatter domes, and richer usage of gilded mosaics and icons rather than statues. Since the Byzantines resided in Sicily for some time, their architectural influence can still be seen today, for example in the Cathedral of Cefalu, Palermo, or Monreale, with their richly decorated churches.

The term "Italo-Byzantine" is used for sculpture much less often, as the Byzantines did not provide large models to follow for that. It may be used of ivories, mosaics and the like. In architecture it is the almost inevitable term used for San Marco, Venice, and a few other very old buildings in Venice (the Fondaco dei Turchi for example) and on the small islands of Torcello (Torcello Cathedral) and Murano in the lagoon, but is not often used for other buildings (until 19th-century revivals such as Westminster Cathedral and Bristol Byzantine). Even the rest of Venetian Gothic architecture does not owe much to Byzantium. St Mark's Basilica in Venice is also an example of Byzantine architecture in Italy. It is one of the best known examples of Italo-Byzantine architecture

== Romanesque architecture ==
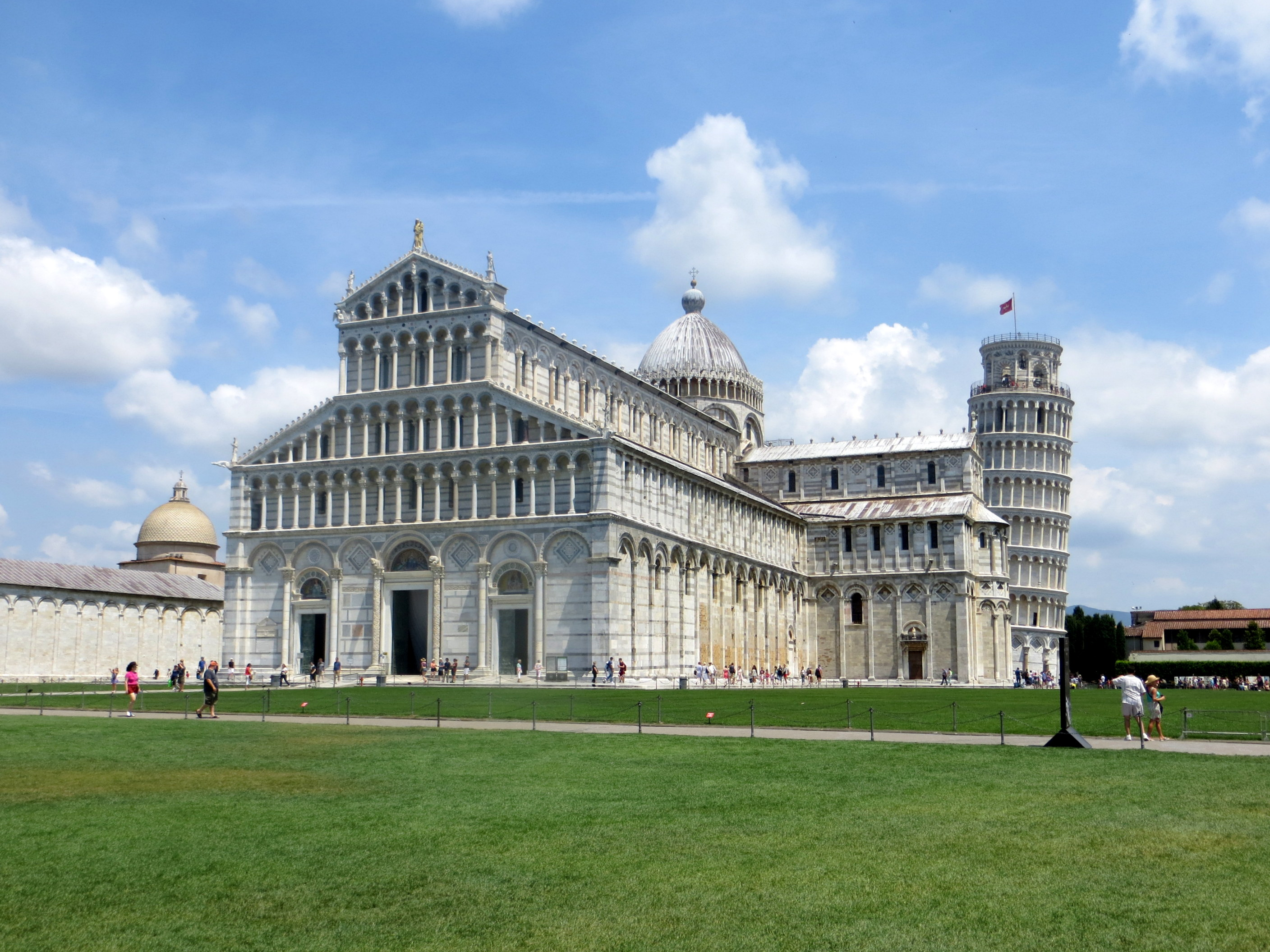
The Duomo and the Leaning Tower in the Piazza dei Miracoli, Pisa

Between the Byzantine and the Gothic period was the Romanesque movement, which went from approximately 800 AD to 1100 AD. This was one of the most fruitful and creative periods in Italian architecture, when several masterpieces such as the Leaning Tower of Pisa in Piazza dei Miracoli and the Basilica of Sant'Ambrogio in Milan were built. The style was called "Roman"-esque because of its usage of the Roman arches, stained glass windows, and also its curved columns which commonly featured in cloisters.

Romanesque architecture varied greatly in Italy in both style and construction. Arguably, the most artistic was the Tuscan Romanesque, especially Florentine and Pisan, yet that of Sicily, influenced by the Norman settlers, was considerable too. Lombard Romanesque was certainly more structurally progressive than the Tuscan but less artistic.

Romanesque architecture in Italy halted the construction of wooden roofs in churches, and also experimented with the usage of the groined vault or barrels. The buildings' weight tended to buckle on the outside, and there used to be buttresses to support the buildings. Church walls using the Romanesque tended to be bulky and heavy to support the roof, however this meant that Romanesque church interiors in Italy tended to be far more banal and bland than those of the Early Christian and Byzantine periods. They used to simply consist of marble or stone, and had little decoration, unlike the rich mosaics found in Italian Byzantine architectural works.

The main innovation of Italian Romanesque architecture was the vault, which had never been seen before in the history of Western architecture.

== Gothic architecture ==
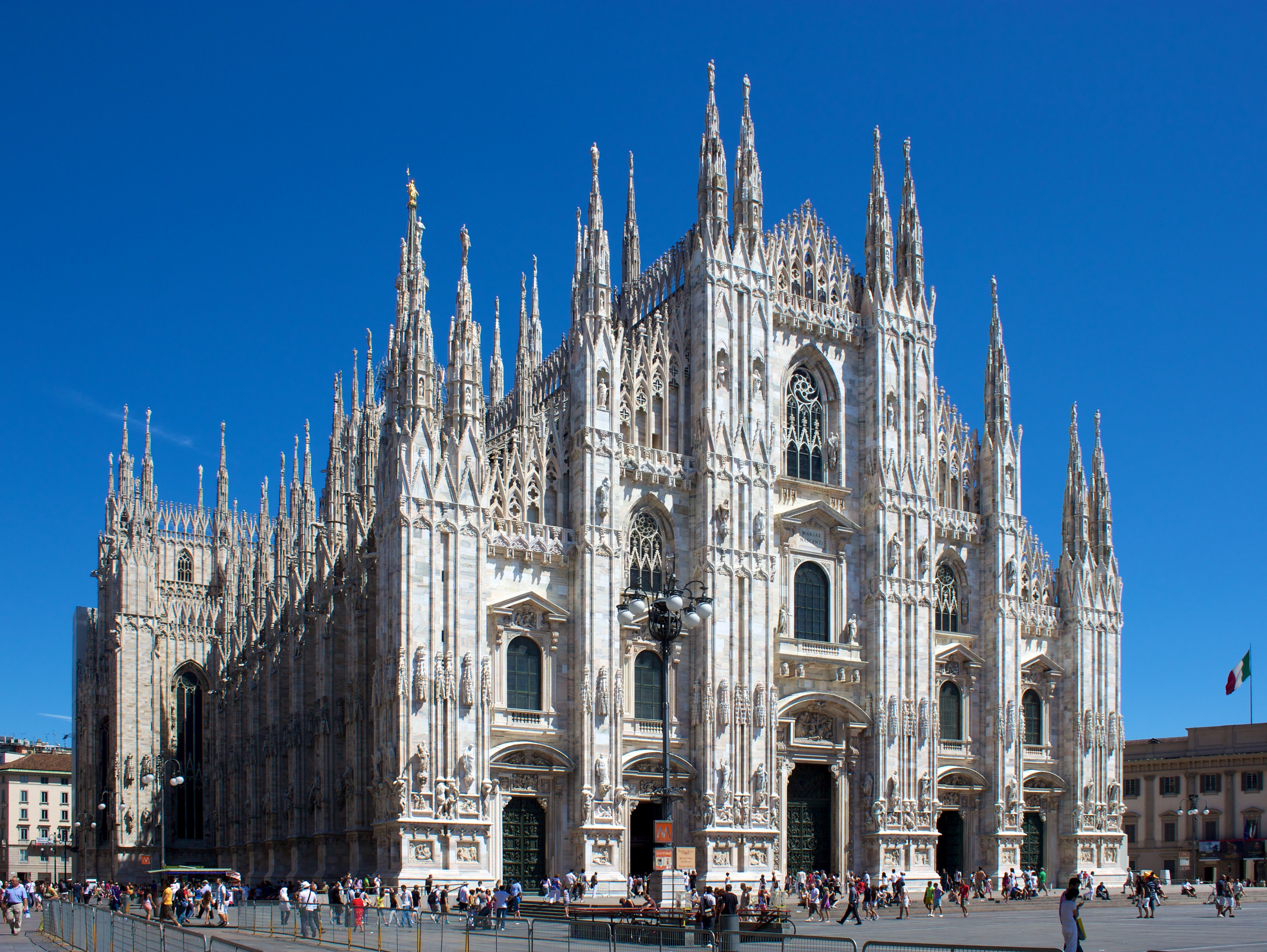
Milan Cathedral is the fourth-largest church in the world.

The Gothic architecture appeared in Italy in the 12th century. Italian Gothic always maintained a peculiar characteristic which differentiated its evolution from that in France, where it had originated. In particular, the bold architectural solutions and technical innovations of the French Gothic never appeared: Italian architects preferred to keep the construction tradition established in the previous centuries. Aesthetically, in Italy the vertical development was rarely important.

Gothic architecture was imported in Italy, just as it was in many other European countries. The Benedictine Cistercian order was, through their new edifices, the main carrier of this new architectural style. It spread from Burgundy (in what is now eastern France), their original area, over the rest of Western Europe.

A possible timeline of Gothic architecture in Italy can comprise:

- an initial development of the Cistercian architecture
- an "early Gothic" phase (c. 1228–1290)
- the "mature Gothic" of 1290–1385
- a late Gothic phase from 1385 to the 16th century, with the completion of the great Gothic edifices begun previously, as the Milan Cathedral and San Petronio Basilica in Bologna.

== Renaissance and Mannerist architecture ==
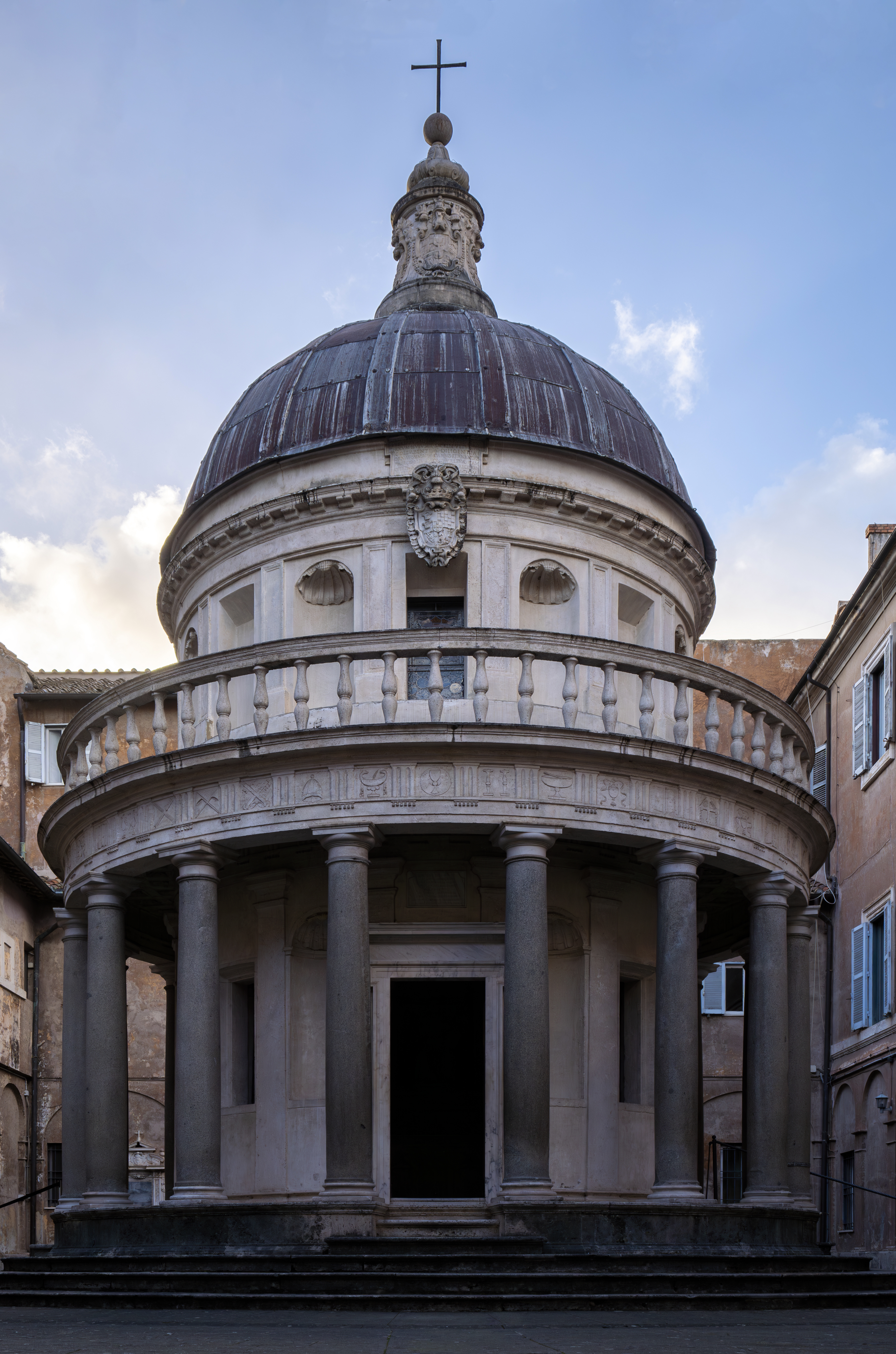
Tempietto di San Pietro in Montorio, Rome, 1502, by Bramante. This small temple marks the place where St. Peter was crucified.

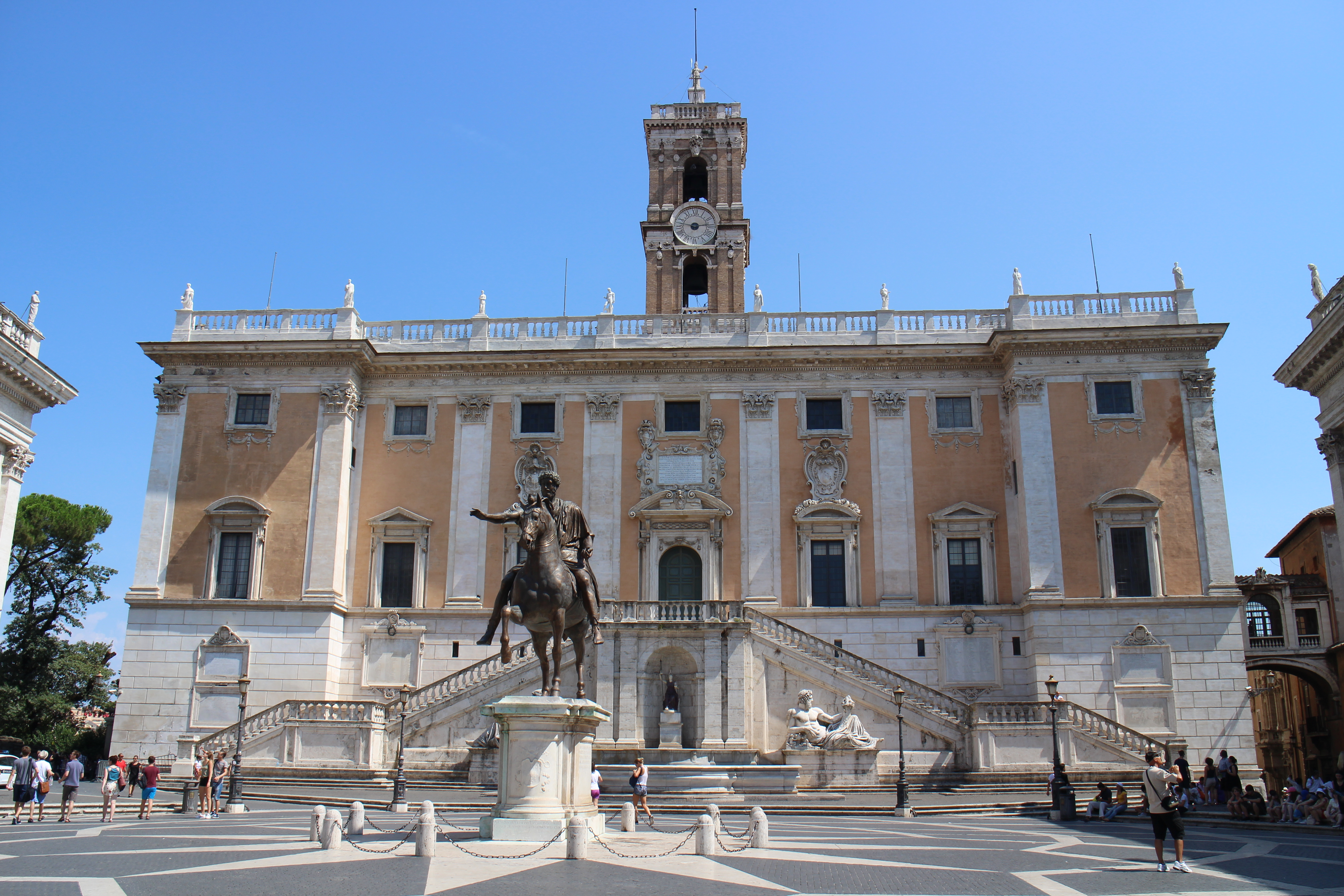
Palazzo Senatorio, seat of the municipality of Rome. It has been a town hall since AD 1144, making it the oldest town hall in the world.

Italy of the 15th century, and the city of Florence in particular, was home to the Renaissance. It is in Florence that the new architectural style had its beginning, not slowly evolving in the way that Gothic grew out of Romanesque, but consciously brought to being by particular architects who sought to revive the order of a past "Golden Age". The scholarly approach to the architecture of the ancient coincided with the general revival of learning. A number of factors were influential in bringing this about.

Italian architects had always preferred forms that were clearly defined and structural elements that expressed their purpose. Many Tuscan Romanesque buildings demonstrate these characteristics, as seen in the Florence Baptistery and Pisa Cathedral.

Italy had never fully adopted the Gothic style of architecture. Apart from the Cathedral of Milan, largely the work of German builders, few Italian churches show the emphasis on verticality, the clustered shafts, ornate tracery and complex ribbed vaulting that characterise Gothic in other parts of Europe.

The presence, particularly in Rome, of ancient architectural remains showing the ordered Classical style provided an inspiration to artists at a time when philosophy was also turning towards the Classical.

Dome of Florence Cathedral

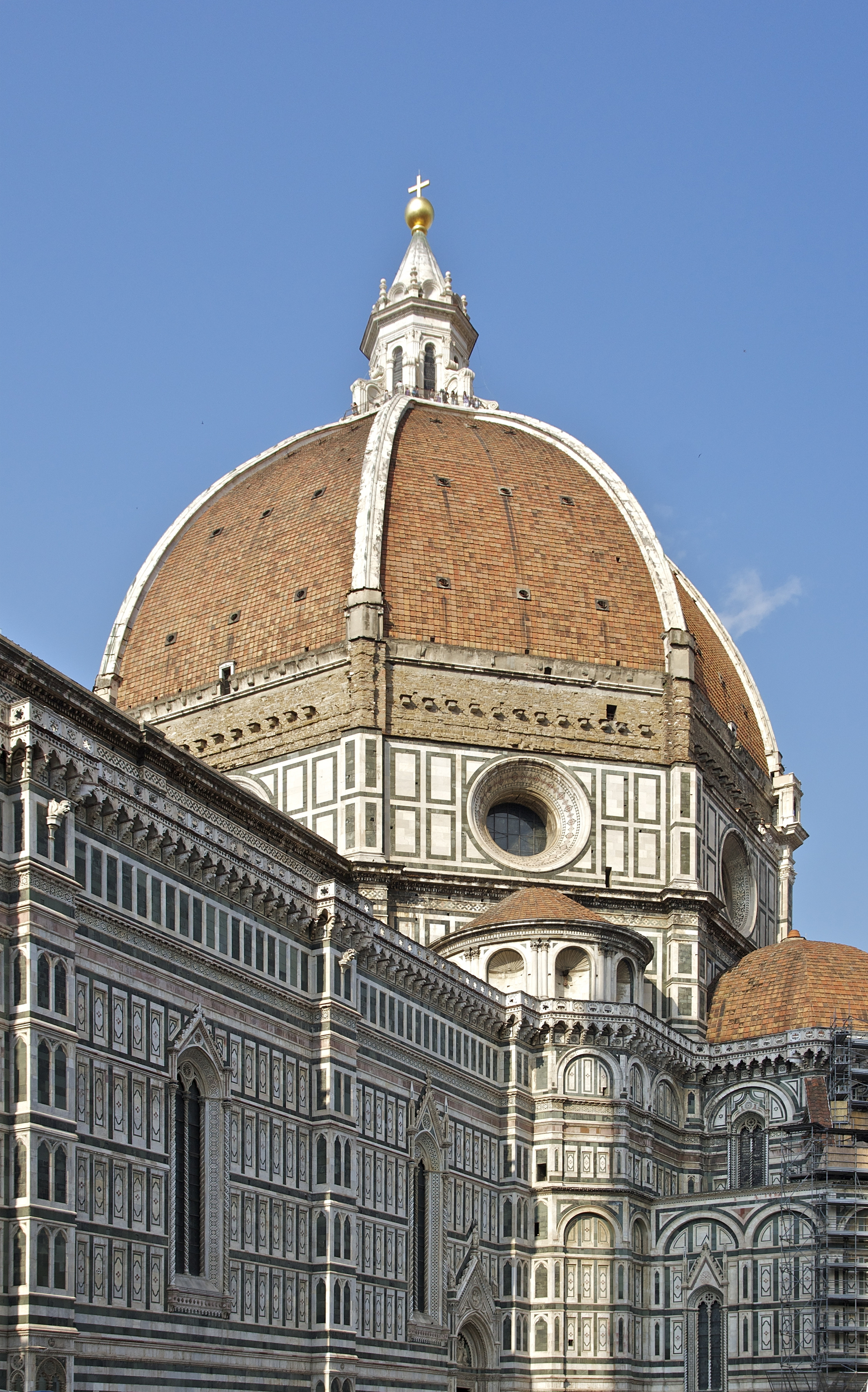
Dome of the Florence Cathedral

The transition from Gothic to Renaissance architecture coincides with the construction of the dome of the Florence Cathedral, carried out by Filippo Brunelleschi between 1420 and 1436. The Cathedral, built by Arnolfo di Cambio, was left unfinished by the end of the 14th century; it had a huge hole at the centre, where the dome was meant to be. The competition to build it was won by Brunelleschi, who built the largest dome since Roman times.

Basilica of San Lorenzo

The Basilica di San Lorenzo in Florence was designed by Brunelleschi using all the things he had learnt by studying the architecture of Ancient Rome. It has arches, columns and round-topped windows in the Roman style. It looks completely different from the pointy-arched churches of the Gothic period. The building, with alterations, was not completed until after his death.

Basilica of Sant'Andrea

When the Roman Emperors came back from winning a battle, they built a triumphal arch as a monument to themselves. There are several of these monuments in Rome as well as in other parts of Italy, and the general design is that of a big arch at the centre, and a smaller lower arch or doorway on either side. The architect Leon Battista Alberti adapted the Roman triumphal arch to the church facade of the Basilica of Sant'Andrea in Mantua. He used the same pattern of tall and arched, low and square, all down the inside of the church as well. This was copied by many other architects. It was also the first building to use columns in the giant order.

Medici Riccardi Palace

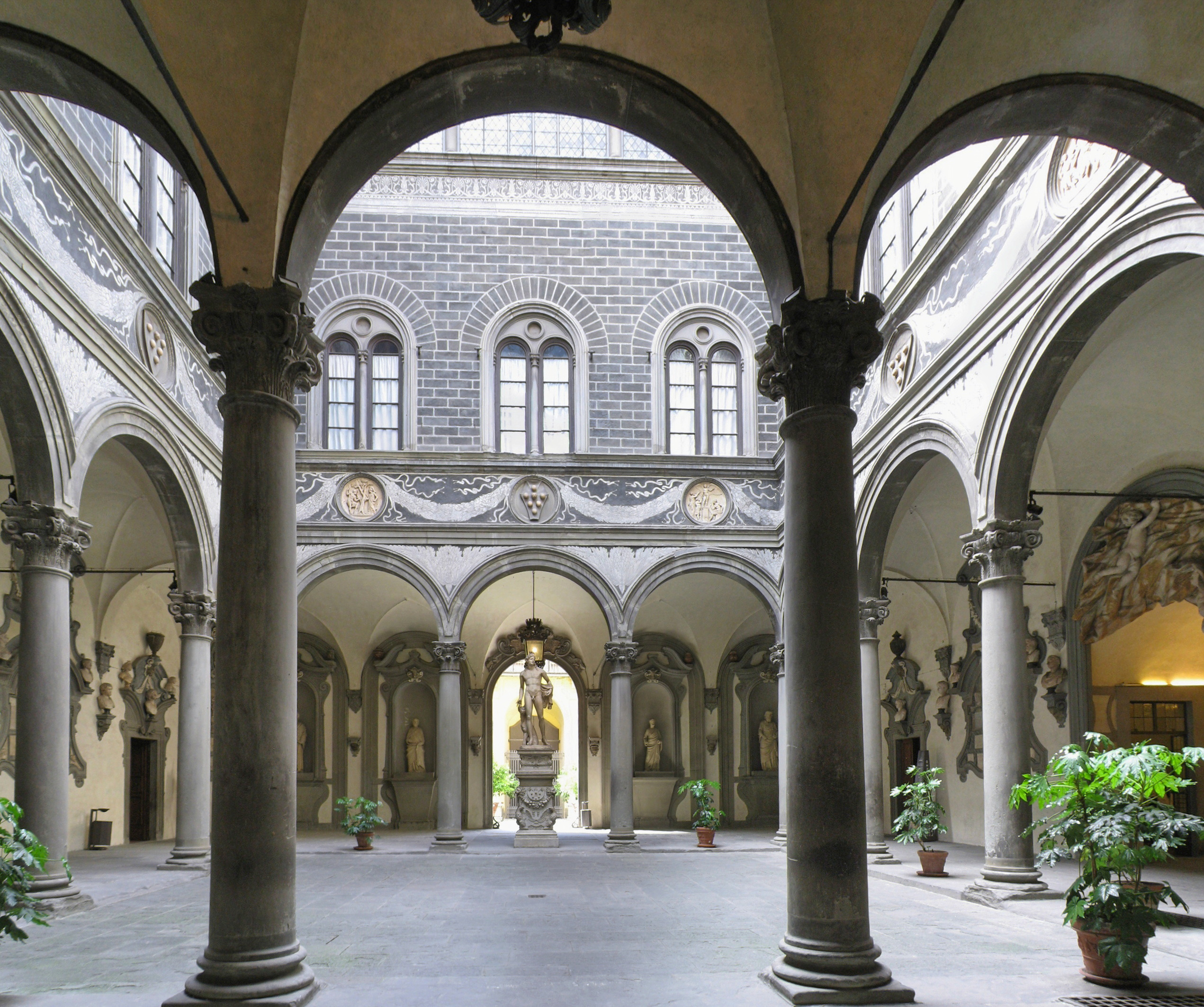
Courtyard of Palazzo Medici-Riccardi, Florence

When it came to building palaces, the rich people of the Renaissance had different needs to the Roman Emperors, so the architects had to use the rules to make a new sort of grand building. These Renaissance palaces, of which the Palazzo Medici Riccardi is a fine example, are usually three stories high and quite plain on the outside. On the inside there is a courtyard, surrounded by beautiful columns and windows. Architects like Michelozzo, who worked for Cosimo de' Medici, looked at the Roman Colosseum for inspiration.

Saint Peter's Basilica

The most famous church in Rome was the Old St. Peter's Basilica, built over a small shrine believed to mark the burial place of St. Peter. By the end of the 15th century, the old basilica had fallen into disrepair. In 1505, Pope Julius II made a decision to demolish the ancient basilica and replace it with a new one. A succession of popes and architects followed in the next 120 years, their combined efforts resulting in the present building. By the time it was finished, many important artists had worked on the design, which changed dramatically, becoming more Baroque than Renaissance. Among the architects present on the site there were Donato Bramante, Raphael, Antonio da Sangallo the Younger, Michelangelo, Pirro Ligorio, Giacomo Barozzi da Vignola, Giacomo della Porta, and Carlo Maderno. It has one of the most magnificent domes in the world, which has been copied in many countries.

== Baroque and Rococo architecture ==
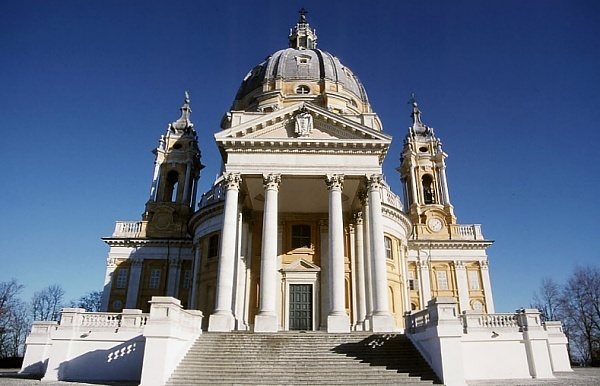
The Basilica of Superga near Turin

One of the most original works of late Baroque architecture is the Palazzina di caccia di Stupinigi (Hunting Lodge of Stupinigi), dating back to 18th century. Featuring a highly articulated plant based upon a Saint Andrew's Cross, it was designed by Filippo Juvarra, who also built the Basilica di Superga, near Turin.

In the same period in Veneto there was a rapprochement with Palladian architecture, evident in Villa Pisani at Stra (1721) and San Simeone Piccolo church in Venice (completed in 1738).

In Rome, some of the most significant achievements are the Spanish Steps and the Trevi Fountain, while the façade of San Giovanni in Laterano by Alessandro Galilei has more austere, classical traits.

In the Kingdom of Naples, the architect Luigi Vanvitelli began in 1752 the construction of the Royal Palace of Caserta. In this large complex, the grandiose Baroque style interiors and gardens are opposed to a more sober building envelope, which seems to anticipate the motifs of the Neoclassical style. The gigantic size of the palace is echoed by the Ospedale L'Albergo Reale dei Poveri in Naples, built in the same years by Ferdinando Fuga.

== Neoclassical and 19th century architecture ==
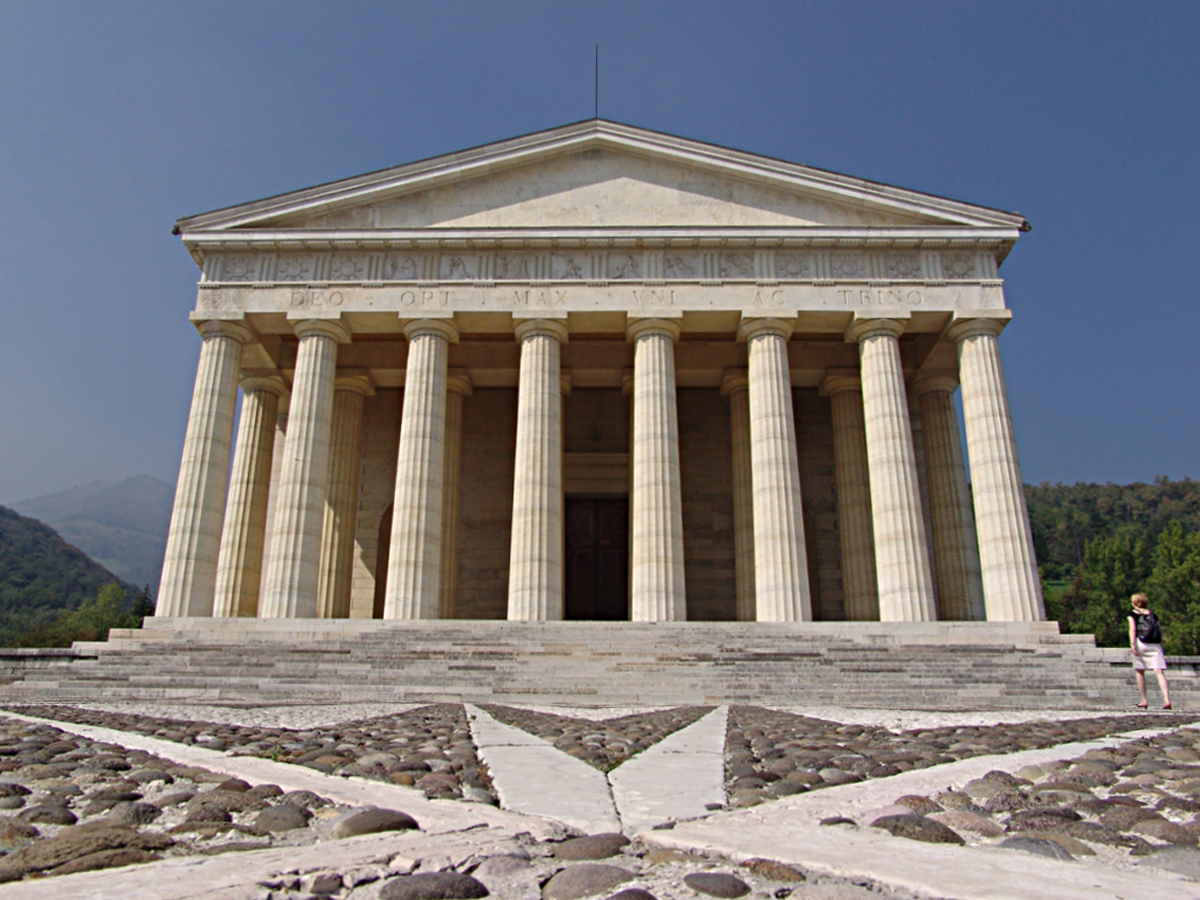
The Neoclassical Tempio Canoviano in Possagno

A return to more classical architectural forms as a reaction to the Rococo style can be detected in early 18th century, most vividly represented in the Palladian architecture. In the late 18th and early 19th centuries Italy was affected by the Neoclassical architectural movement. Everything from villas, palaces, gardens, interiors and art began to be based on ancient Roman and Greek themes, and buildings were widely themed on the Villa Capra "La Rotonda", the masterpiece by Andrea Palladio. Before the discoveries of the lost cities of Pompeii and Herculaneum, buildings were themed on Ancient Rome and Classical Athens, but were later inspired by these archaeological sites.

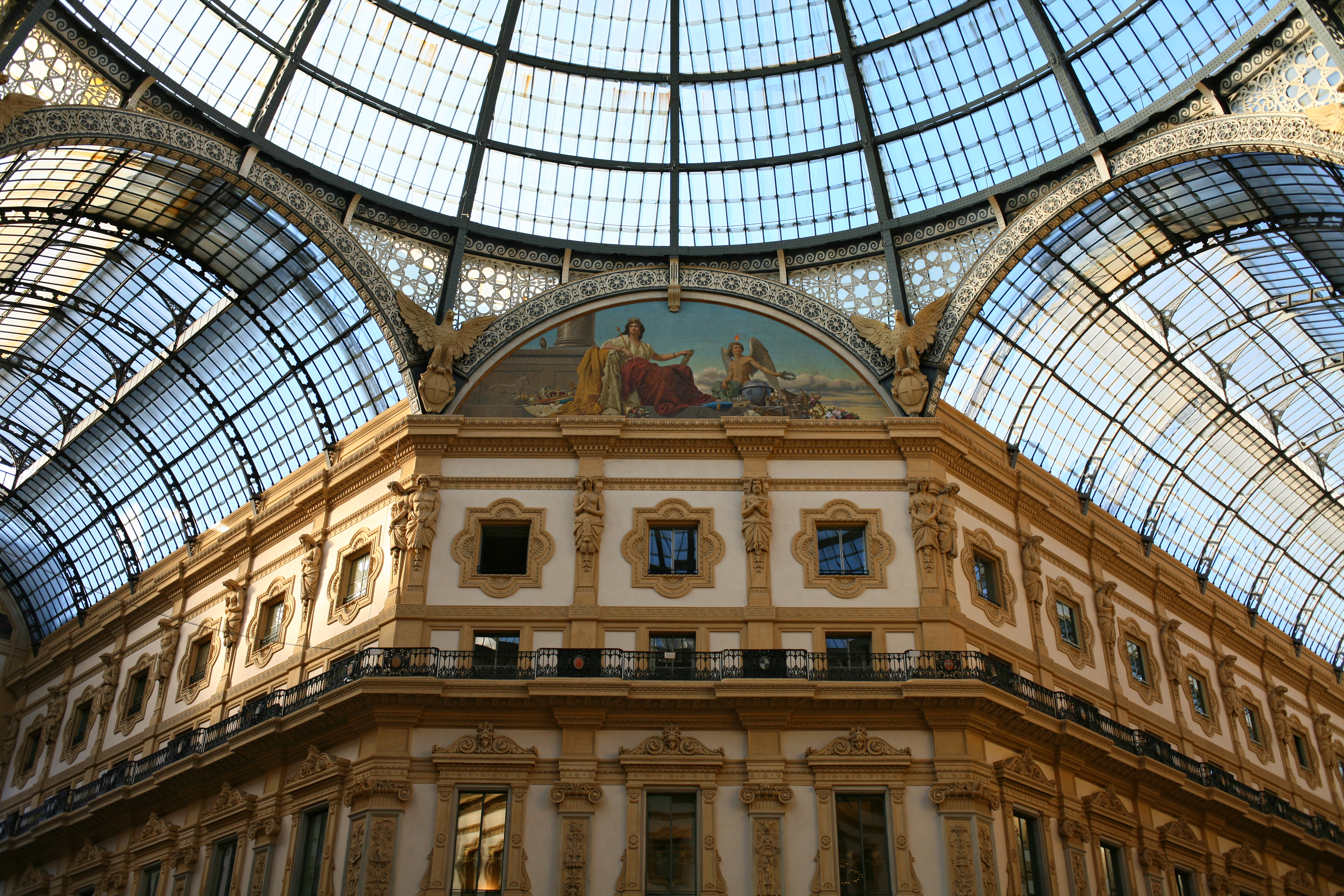
Glass roof of the Galleria Vittorio Emanuele II in Milan

Examples of Neoclassical architecture in Italy include Luigi Cagnola's Arco della Pace (Milan), the San Carlo Theatre (Naples, 1810), San Francesco di Paola (Naples, 1817), Pedrocchi Café (Padua, 1816), Tempio Canoviano, (Posagno, 1819), Teatro Carlo Felice (Genoa, 1827), and the Cisternone (Livorno, 1829).

Italy, in the mid-19th century, was also well known for some relatively avant-garde structures. The Galleria Vittorio Emanuele II in Milan, built in 1865, was the first building in iron, glass and steel in Italy, and the world's oldest purpose-built shopping gallery, which later influenced the Galleria Umberto I in Naples.

== Modern architecture ==
=== Art Nouveau (Liberty style) architecture ===
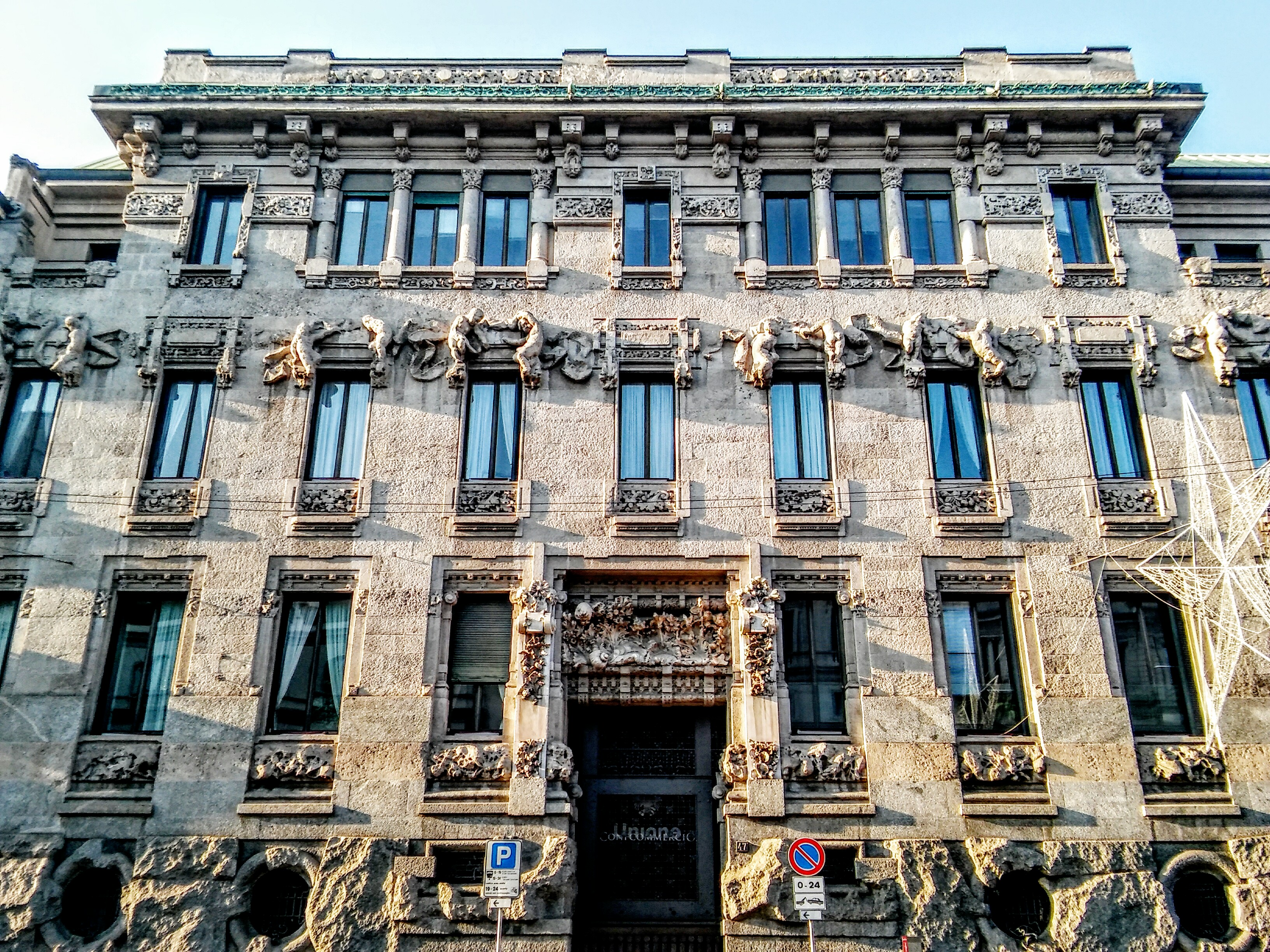
Palazzo Castiglioni in Milan, designed in the Liberty style

Art Nouveau, known in Italy as Liberty style, had its main and most original exponents in Giuseppe Sommaruga and Ernesto Basile. The former was author of Palazzo Castiglioni in Milan, while the second projected an expansion of Palazzo Montecitorio in Rome.

In the 1920s and following years a new architectural language, Razionalismo, was introduced. This form of Futurist architecture was pioneered by Antonio Sant'Elia and hence by Gruppo 7, formed in 1926. After the dissolution of the group, it was adopted by single artists like Giuseppe Terragni (Casa del Fascio, Como), Adalberto Libera (Villa Malaparte in Capri) and Giovanni Michelucci (Firenze Santa Maria Novella railway station).

During the Fascist period, Razionalismo was outranked by Novecento Italiano, which rejected the avant-garde themes and aimed instead to revive the art of the past. Its most important members in the field of architecture were Gio Ponti, Pietro Aschieri and Giovanni Muzio. This movement inspired Marcello Piacentini in his creation of a "simplified Neoclassicism" linked to the rediscovery of the imperial Rome. Piacentini was author of several works in many Italian cities, the most important of which is the controversial creation of Via della Conciliazione in Rome.

=== Fascist architecture ===
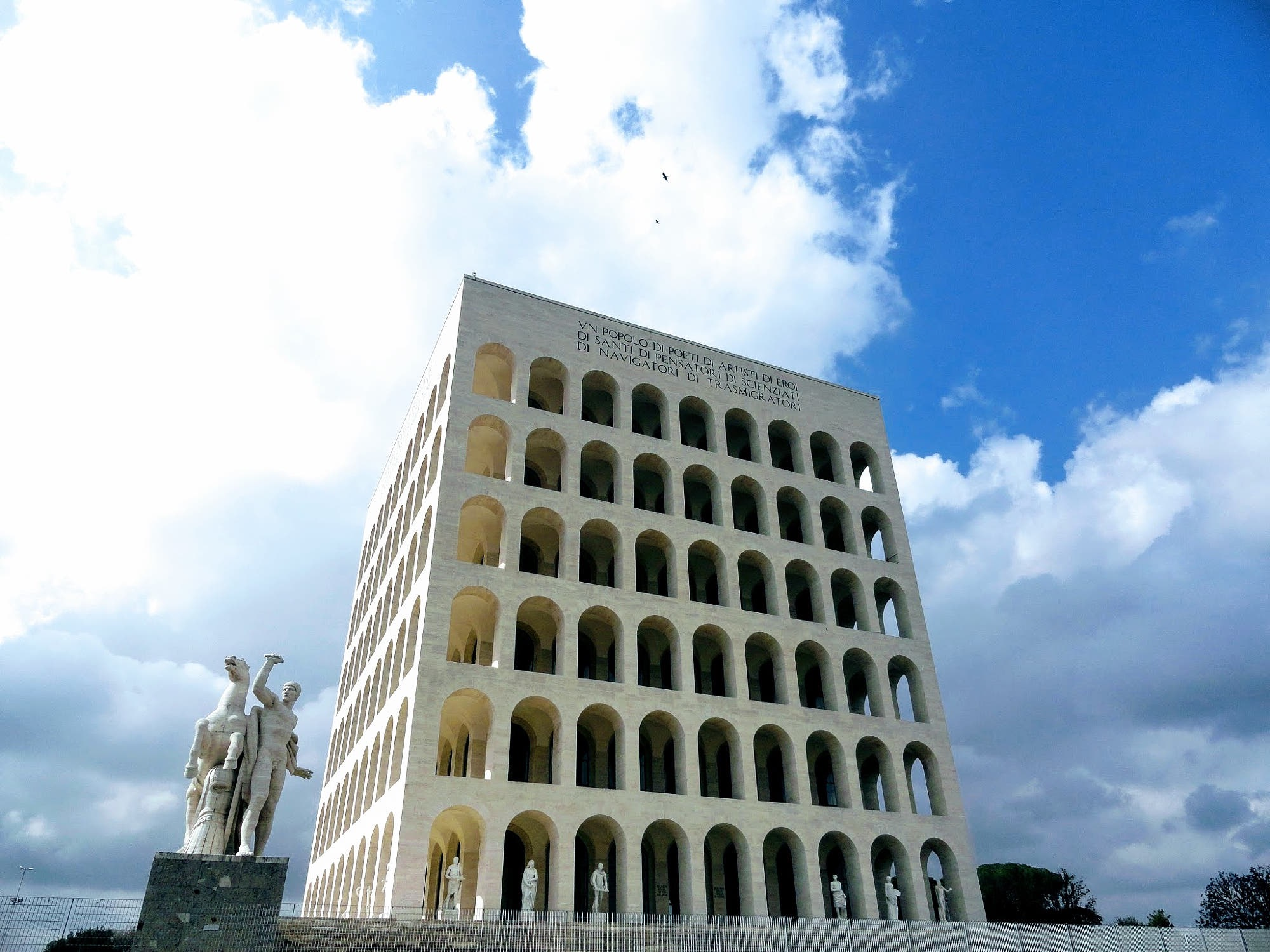
Palazzo della Civiltà Italiana in Rome is a perfect example of Fascist architecture.

Rationalist-Fascist architecture was an Italian architectural style developed during the Fascist regime and in particular starting from the late 1920s. It was promoted and practiced initially by the Gruppo 7 group, whose architects included Luigi Figini, Guido Frette, Sebastiano Larco, Gino Pollini, Carlo Enrico Rava, Giuseppe Terragni, Ubaldo Castagnola and Adalberto Libera. Two branches have been identified, a modernist branch with Giuseppe Terragni being the most prominent exponent, and a conservative branch of which Marcello Piacentini and the La Burbera group were most influential.

Fascist styles often resemble that of ancient Rome, but can extend to modern aesthetics as well. Fascist-era buildings are frequently constructed with particular concern given to symmetry and simplicity. Fascist-styles of architecture are a branch of modernist architecture which became popular in the early 20th century. The Italian Fascist style was also greatly influenced by the rationalist movement in Italy in the 1920s. Rationalist architecture, with the help of Italian government support, celebrated the new fascist age of culture and government in Italy.

=== Modern and Post-Modern architecture ===
The influential modernist Pirelli Tower in Milan, built from 1956 to 1958

Two Italian architects have received the Pritzker Architecture Prize: Aldo Rossi (1990) and Renzo Piano (1998). Some of the main architects working in Italy between the end of the 20th century and the beginning of the 21st are Renzo Piano, Massimiliano Fuksas and Gae Aulenti. Piano's works include Stadio San Nicola in Bari, Auditorium Parco della Musica in Rome, the renovation works of the Old Port of Genoa, and Padre Pio Pilgrimage Church in San Giovanni Rotondo. Among Fuksas' projects (As of January 2011) are Piedmont Region Headquarters and Roma Convention Center - La Nuvola at EUR, Rome. Gae Aulenti's Italian works feature the renovation works of Palazzo Grassi in Venice and the "Museo" station of the Naples Metro.

== Contemporary architecture ==
Several internationally active architects have contributed significant works to contemporary architecture in Italy. Among them are the Swiss architect Mario Botta (Museo d'arte moderna e contemporanea di Trento e Rovereto; renovation of La Scala in Milan), Michele Valori (the Corviale housing complex), Zaha Hadid (MAXXI in Rome; the skyscraper "Lo Storto" in Milan), Richard Meier (Jubilee Church and the building covering the Ara Pacis in Rome), Norman Foster (Firenze Belfiore railway station), Daniel Libeskind (the skyscraper "Il Curvo" in Milan), Arata Isozaki (Palasport Olimpico in Turin, with Pier Paolo Maggiora and Marco Brizio; the skyscraper "Il Dritto" in Milan), and Mario Cucinella (the Italian Pavilion for Expo 2025 Osaka).

== See also ==
- Architecture of Rome
- North-Western Italian architecture
- Italianate architecture
- Gold Medal for Italian Architecture
- Timeline of Italian architecture
- List of architecture schools in Italy
