= Krista Buecking =

Canadian artist

- Born: 1982 (age 43–44)
- Education: University of Guelph, California Institute of the Arts
- Occupations: sculptor, visual artist

Krista Buecking (born 1982) is a Canadian visual artist.

== Biography ==
Krista Buecking was born in Brampton, Ontario in 1982, and currently lives in Los Angeles, California. From 2002 to 2007, she attended University of Guelph in Guelph, Ontario, and in 2012 she completed a Master of Fine Arts degree at California Institute of the Arts.

== Art practice ==
Krista Buecking's work consists of large-scale sculptures, drawings and installations that explore often sentiments of disappointment, disintegration and renewal. WE THING, her most recent solo exhibition, consisted of architectural, sculptural, plant and video components that attempted to illustrate the intangible, abstract system of neoliberalism. As Ellyn Walker writes in Magenta Magazine, "WE THING [..] reiterates our identity as that of social construct, rooted in the premise of a lifestyle promised, and formerly believed unattainable" Some of Buecking's earlier work consists of drawings of lyrics from classic American pop songs by artists such as Patsy Cline and Elvis Presley, such as That's when your heartaches begin and Are You Lonesome Tonight? As Rosemary Heather writes in a 2010 article in Canadian Art, "Within American pop songs Buecking has located deeper truths about the culture that produced them. Endless change and a taste for the ephemeral have produced the conditions for a rootless population." In her series of drawings from 2007–2008 entitled Proposal for Ruins, Buecking examined various states of disintegration and renewal in a set of modernist buildings that she depicts in ruin. In this series, Buecking selected historical buildings with back stories that connected with the fall-outs from ideological and political impulses of Modernism, such as Frank Lloyd Wright's Fallingwater and Adalberto Libera's Casa Malaparte.
