= North-Western Italian architecture =

North-Western Italian architecture refers to architecture (buildings, sights, monuments, churches, palaces) in the North-Western regions of Italy (Piedmont, Aosta Valley, Liguria and Lombardy), and their capital cities (Aosta, Turin, Milan and Genoa).

== Styles ==
North-Western Italian architecture is usually quite big and bulky, contrasted to the Renaissance and medieval cityscapes in Central Italy, Venetian-style villas and towns in North-Eastern Italy, and cluttered architecture in Southern Italy. Buildings in North-Western Italy are often built with solid bricks, due to the harsh climate in this area. North-Western Italy is not usually identifiable by a particular style: the Aosta Valley and Piedmont tend to be Baroque in essence, Lombardy is a mixture of Central Italian (Emilia-Romagna and Tuscany) and Northern Italian (Piedmont and Lombardy) styles, whilst Liguria is highly unusual, with its brightly painted houses. The area is full of medieval castles, including some very notable early ones in the Aosta Valley and Piedmont, and Renaissance ones in Lombardy. The North-West is also the hub of modern and contemporary Italian architecture; Milan, Turin and Genoa were and still are the capitals of Italian modernist and industrial design, and such examples can be seen in buildings such as the Torre Velasca and the Pirelli Tower in Milan, Lingotto building in Turin and the "Biscione" neighborhood in Genoa.

== Regions ==
=== Aosta Valley ===
Being a mountainous and very small region, the Aosta Valley's contribution to Italian architecture remains relatively small in comparison to some of the bigger regions, but is noted for its bulky and beautiful stone medieval castles, churches and buildings in general. Aostan architecture is alpine in essence and often has the character of resort towns, seen in communes such as Courmayeur and La Thuile. As a popular ski resort, the region is famous for its wooden chalets.

=== Piedmont ===
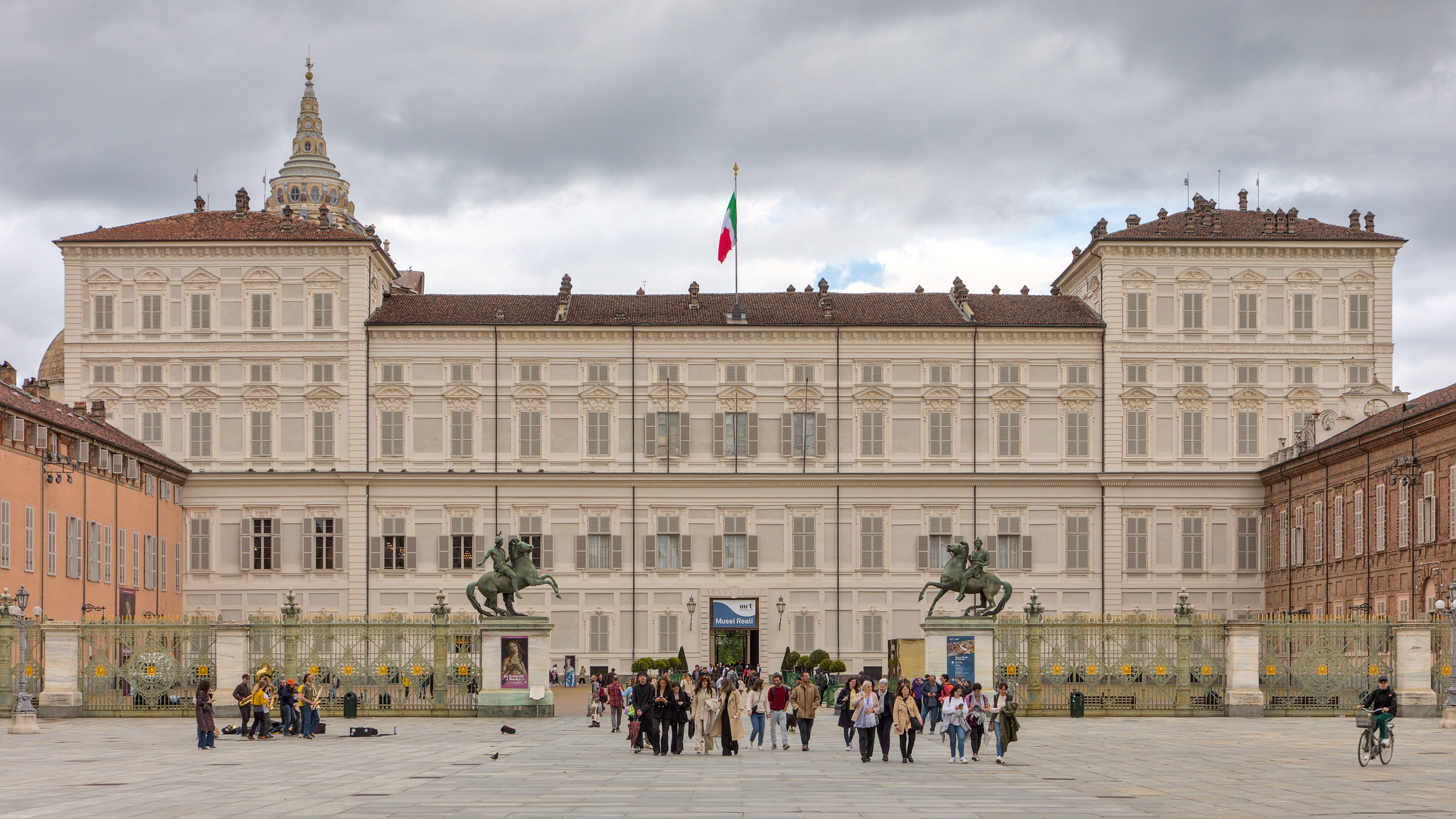
The Royal Palace of Turin

Piedmont's architecture varies very much. The mountainous areas remain similar to those of the Aosta Valley, the central area is a similar to that of Lombardy, the western area and Turin are very baroque in style, whilst the southern part is similar to the architecture of Liguria. However, Piedmont is known for its grand country houses and palaces, such as the Palazzina di caccia di Stupinigi, in Stupinigi and just outside Turin, or the Residences of the Royal House of Savoy which ended up being declared UNESCO World Heritage Sites. Turin's architecture is grandiose, and mixes elements of Baroque, Rococo and Neoclassicism together. As one of the most important industrial regions in Italy, Piedmont is also renowned for its world-class modern-design architecture, such as the Lingotto, for a period one of the biggest and most technologically advanced factories in Europe, or the region's 1930s mountain hotels.

=== Lombardy ===
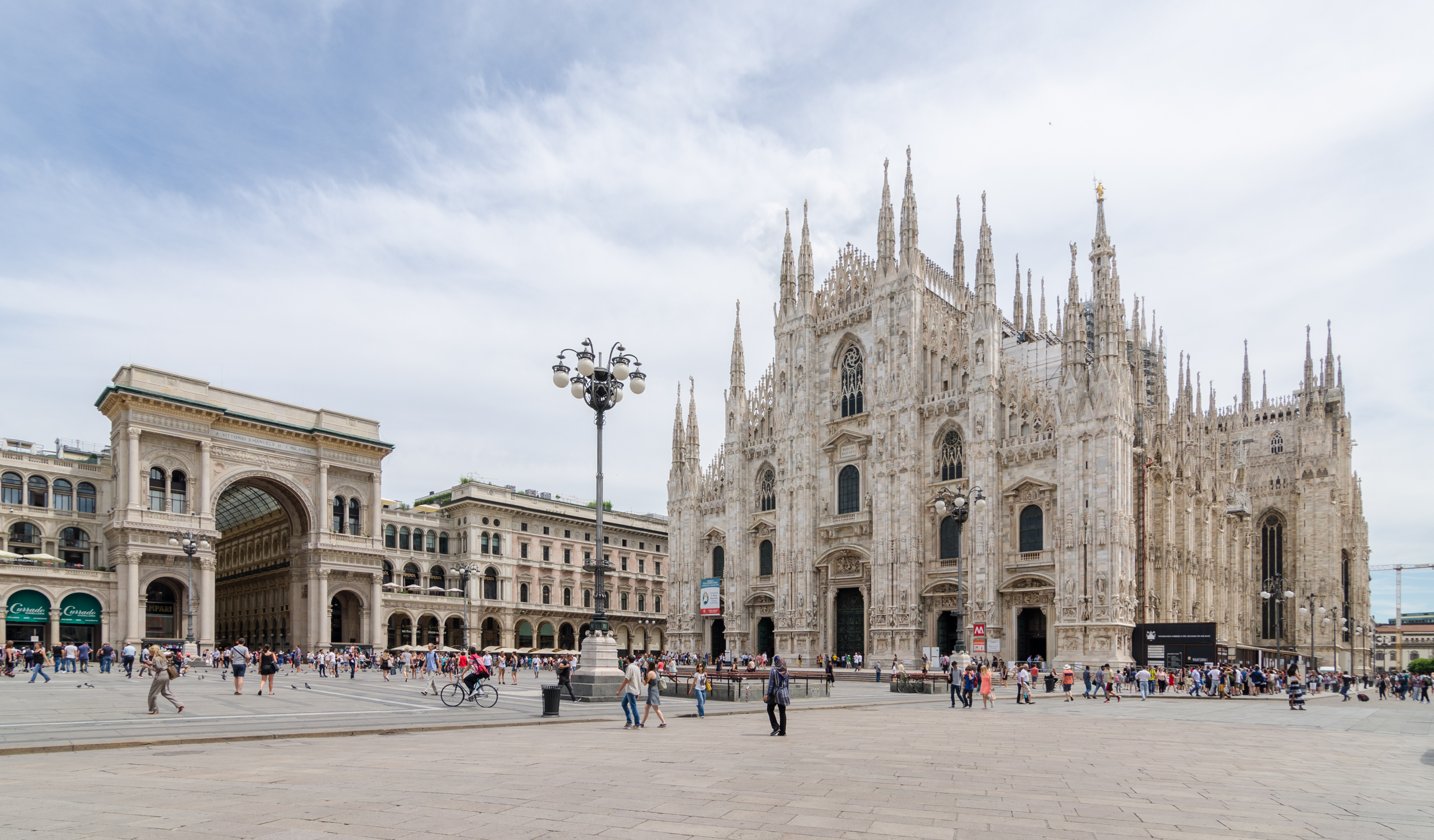
Piazza del Duomo, Milan

Lombardy's architecture also remains eclectic and unique. The southern part takes inspiration from the Renaissance architecture of Emilia-Romagna, however the northern part is in essence very much alpine. Lombardy is known for its beautiful medieval and Renaissance cities, such as Mantua, Bergamo, Pavia and Cremona, with monuments such as the Certosa di Pavia, and for its unique Gothic architecture (known as Lombard Gothic), clearly seen in the impressive Milan Cathedral. Lombardy is also home to Italy's industrial architecture, including Italy's first building in glass, steel and iron, the glamorous shopping gallery Galleria Vittorio Emanuele II in Milan, the impressive 19th century industrial estates at Crespi d'Adda, which have been declared UNESCO World Heritage Sites, and innovative modern architecture seen in the Torre Velasca and Pirelli Tower in Milan.

=== Liguria ===
Liguria probably has the most unusual architectural elements of all the North-Western Italian regions. It is famous for its brightly coloured small houses on the coast, which often have very beautiful and intricate designs. Baroque architecture is also common in Liguria, found in many of the region's cities. However, modern architecture has taken the region as well, with world-famous Ligurian architects such as Renzo Piano constructing innovative structures in Genoa, along with Genoa's big aquarium and the modernist mast structure in the old port of Genoa.

== Notable examples ==
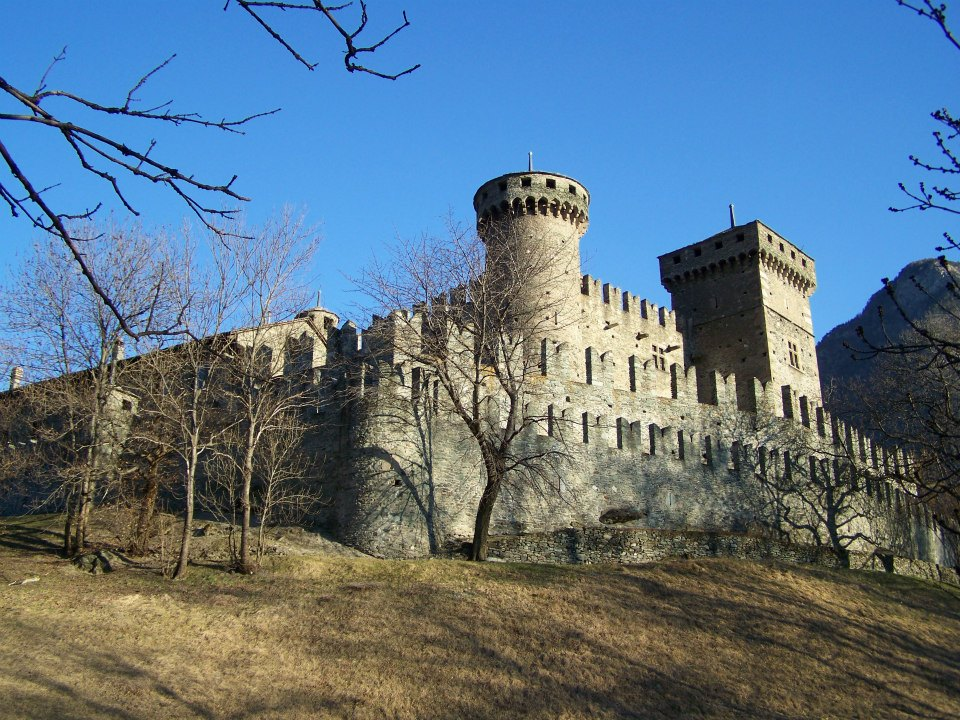
The medieval Fénis Castle

=== Fénis Castle ===
Fénis Castle is highly unusual and one of the Aosta Valley's finest and best examples of medieval 14th-century architecture. It is asymmetrical, and features bastions, bulky stone walls, towers and turrets, and beautiful early-middle age frescoes inside.

=== Monza Cathedral ===
The Monza Cathedral, built in the late 14th century, has a unique Renaissance style making it one of the most beautiful in the region.

=== Milan Cathedral ===
Probably the finest example of Italian Gothic architecture is the huge Milan Cathedral is famous for its medieval spires, impressive facade, grand bronze-doors, and the Madonnina golden statue at the top, which dominates the Milan skyline.

=== Palazzo della Loggia ===
The Palazzo della Loggia in Brescia is a Renaissance palace with strong Venetian influences. It was completed in 1574, after numerous interventions by the most famous architects of the time, including Jacopo Sansovino, Andrea Palladio, Luigi Vanvitelli and Ludovico Beretta, who completed the building.

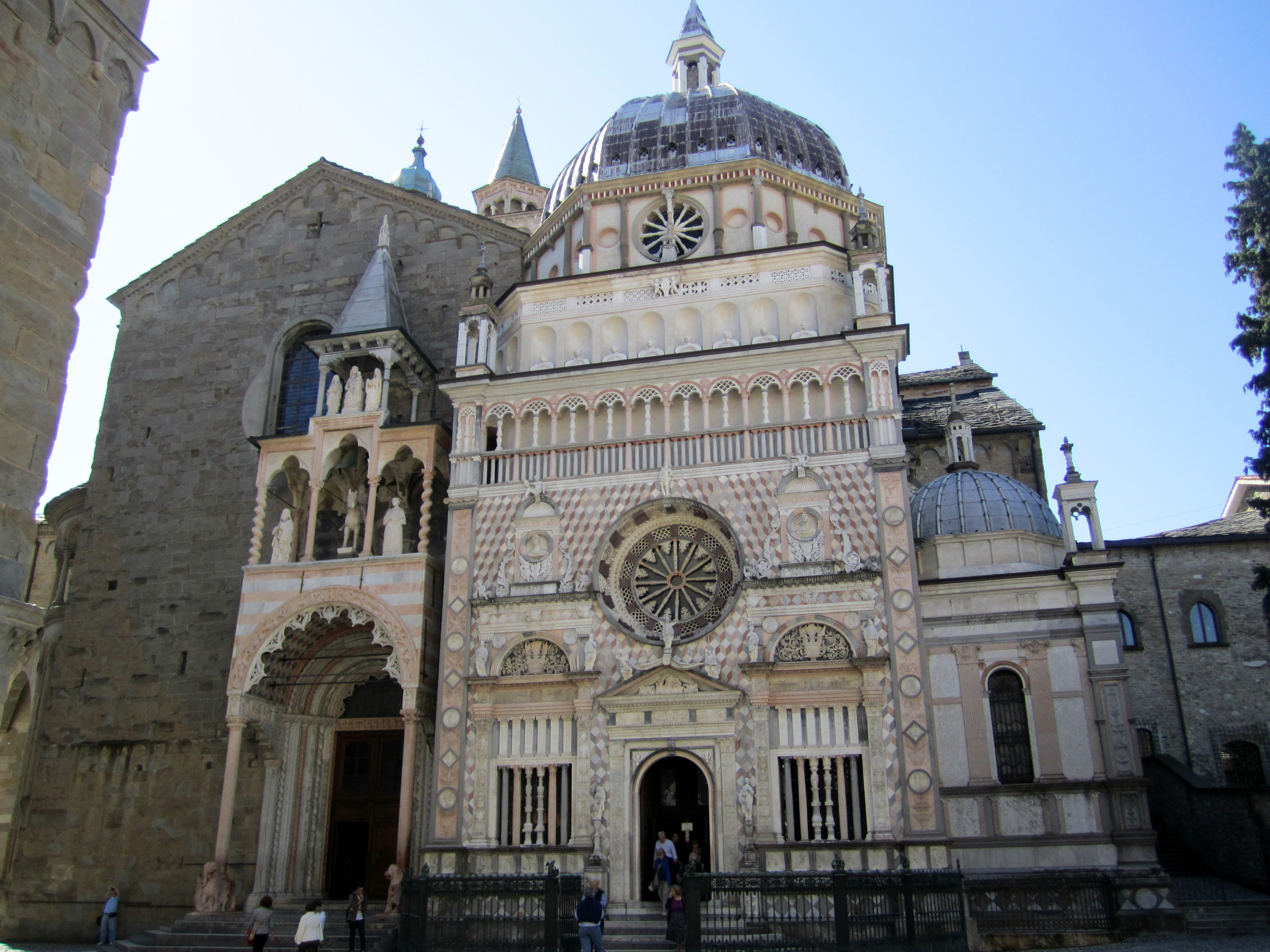
Cappella Colleoni in Bergamo

=== Cappella Coleoni ===
The Cappella Colleoni in Bergamo, built in 1476, has an octagonal dome, similar to that of Florence Cathedral, and a fine marble facade.

=== Palazzo Carignano (Museo del Risorgimento) ===
The Palazzo Carignano is one of the grandest Baroque palaces in Turin, and has two different facades: one Baroque and the other Neoclassical. Built by Guarino Guarini in 1679, it has a beautiful brink rotunda-like facade.

=== Palazzina di caccia of Stupinigi ===
Palazzina di caccia of Stupinigi is a Rococo hunting lodge is the arguably the best example of Rococo architecture in the country, and features an impressive facade, lavish interior, and spacious, leafy gardens and background park.

=== Mole Antonelliana ===
This building, constructed from 1863 until 1897, was meant to be a synagogue in Turin, however with a spire reaching 167 metres, it was for a period in time the world's tallest building.

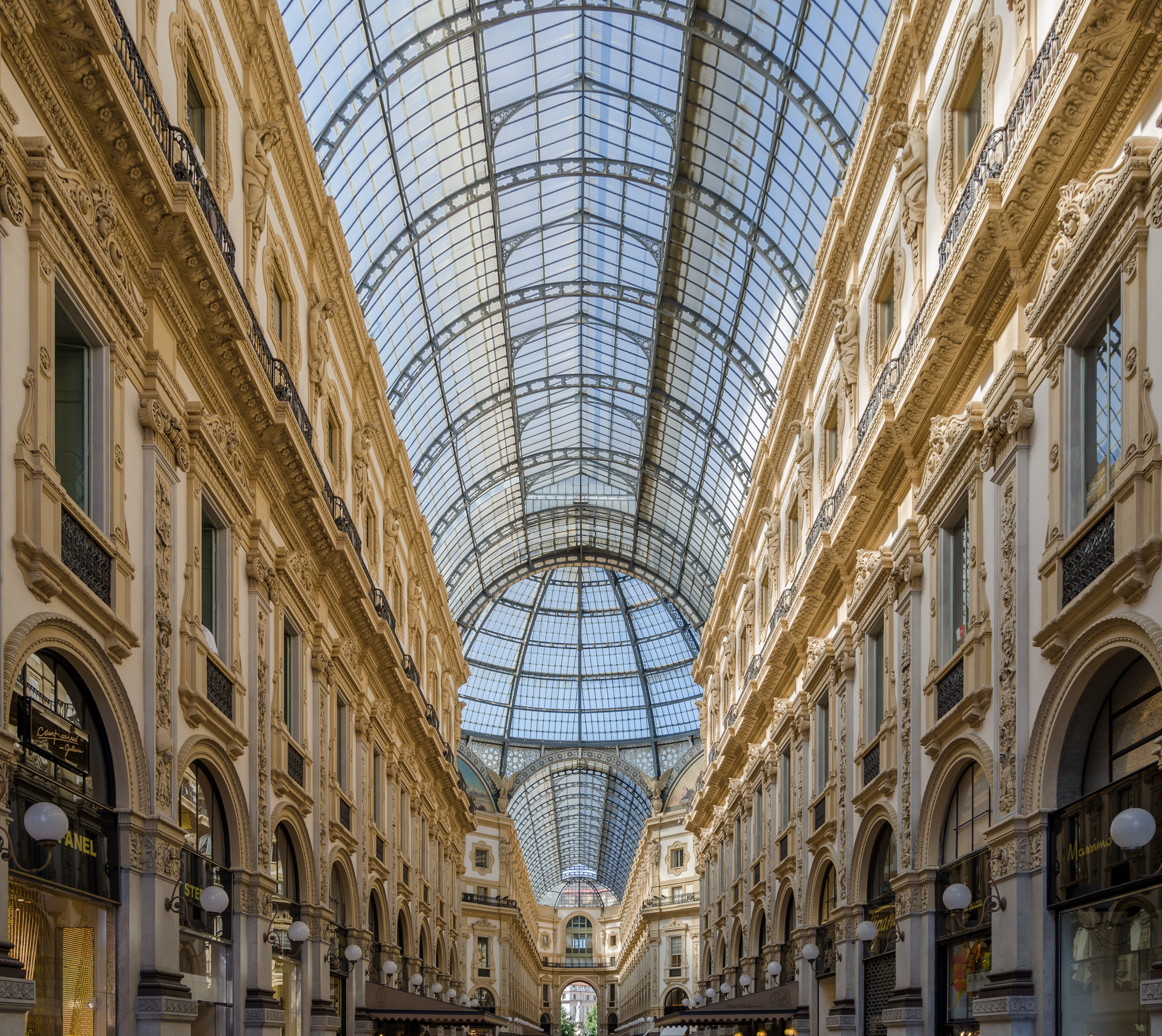
The Galleria Vittorio Emanuele II in Milan

=== Galleria Vittorio Emanuele II ===
This revolutionary gallery was one of the oldest in the world, and the first building to use iron, glass and steel in Italy, built by Menegoni in 1865 and dedicated to King Vittorio Emanuele II.

=== Lingotto ===
The Lingotto is one of the most impressive examples of factory architecture in Italy. It was the plant of car company Fiat and was built from 1915 to 1918.

=== Pirelli Tower ===
The 1959 Pirelli Tower was an Italian pioneer building in modernist architecture.

== Bibliography ==
- Eyewitness Travel: Italy. DK. 2005. ISBN 1-4053-0781-1.
