= Timeline of Italian architecture =

This timeline shows the periods of various architectural styles in the architecture of Italy. Italy's architecture spans almost 3,500 years, from Etruscan and Ancient Roman architecture to Romanesque, Gothic, Renaissance, Baroque, Rococo, Neoclassical, Art Nouveau, Fascist, and Italian modern and contemporary architecture.

== Timeline ==
=== Early period ===
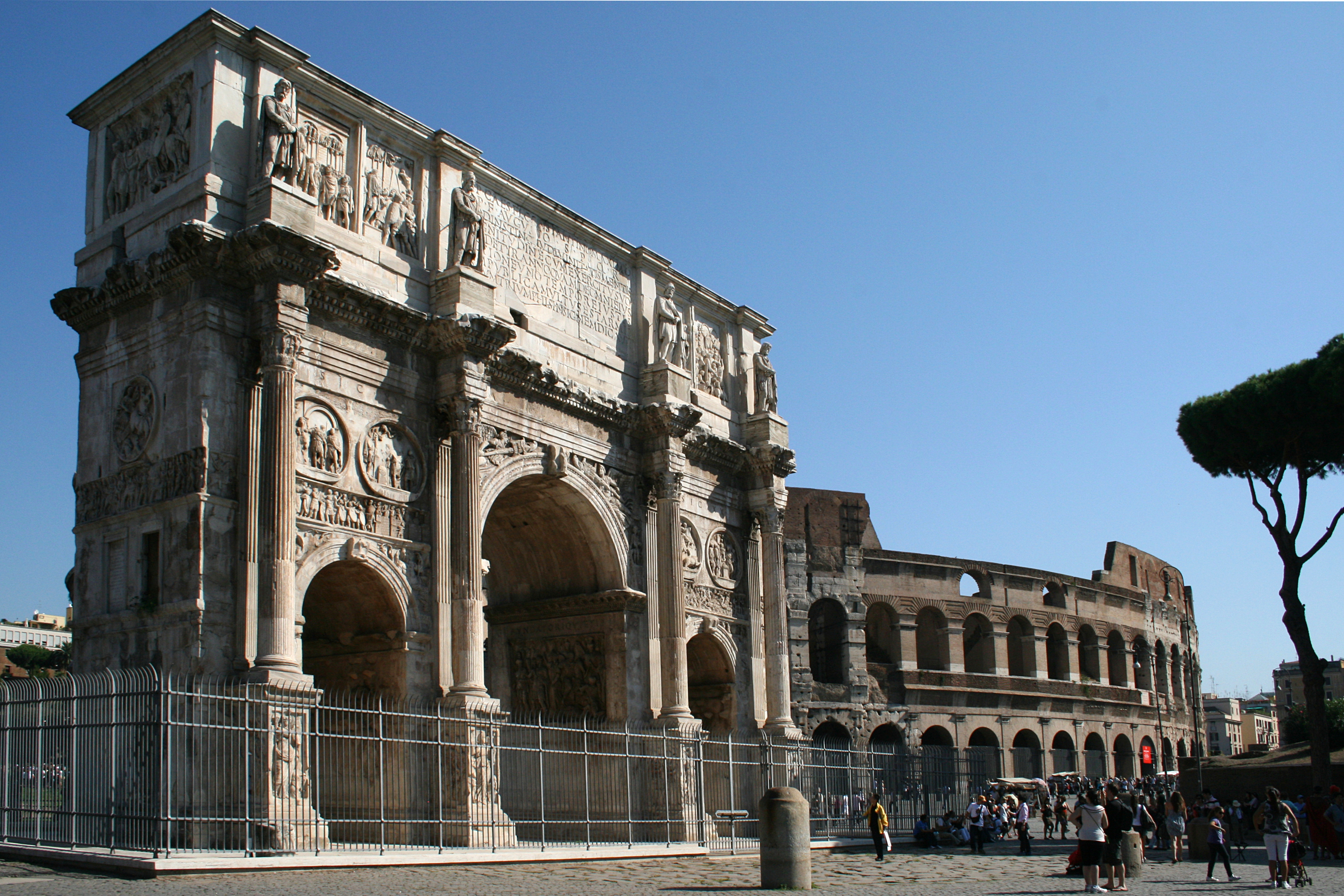
Arch of Constantine, Rome

AD 313 – The arch of Constantine in Rome. Mostly built in concrete, bricks or marble, Roman triumphal arch were grandiose and meant to represent victories, prestige, money and power.

AD 800 – Domes become popular and major features in Byzantine architecture in Italy.

=== Middle Ages ===
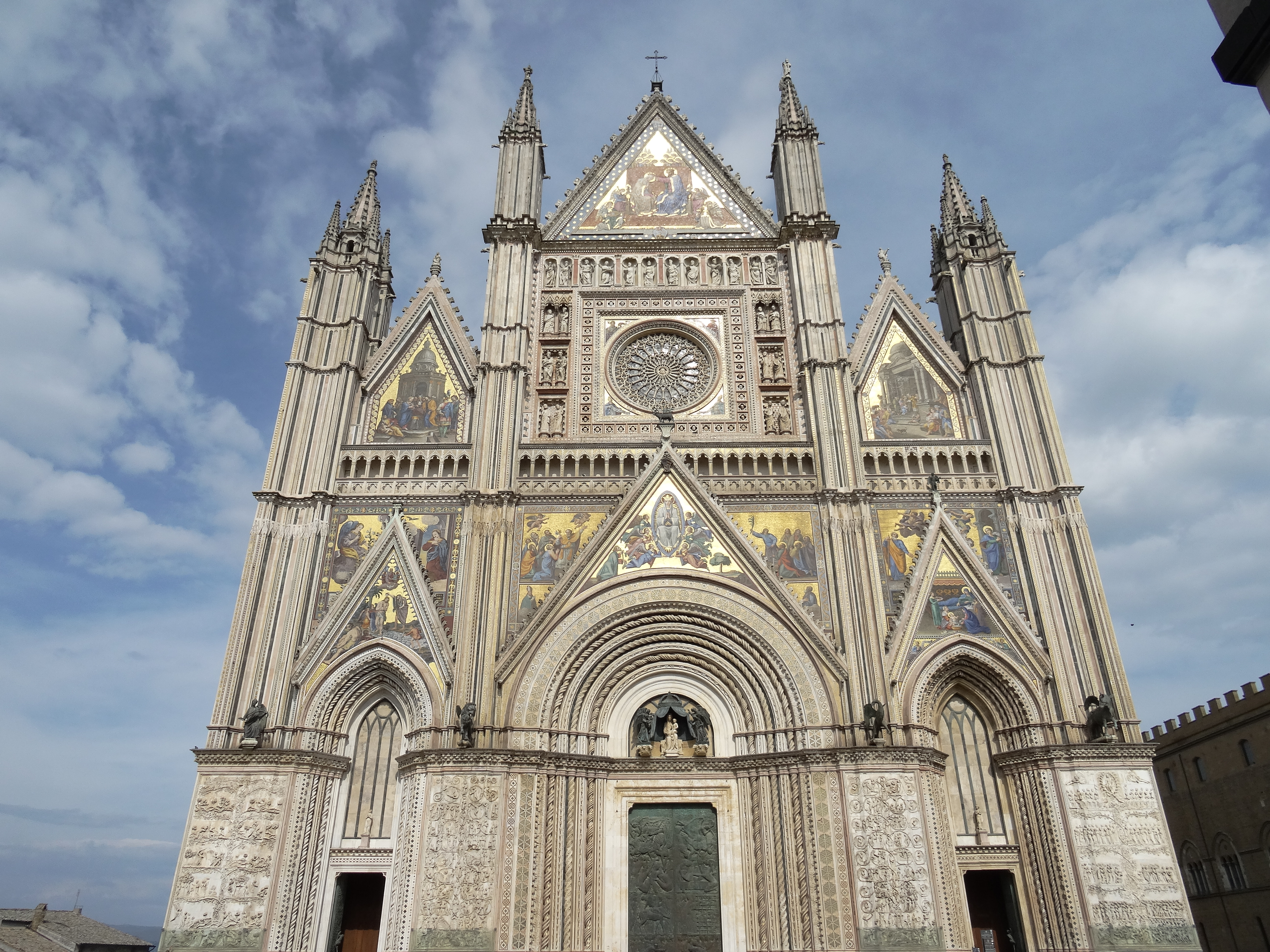
Orvieto Cathedral

c. mid-9th century – The Romanesque style emerges in Italy, built with mainly round arches and based on the simple plans of Roman basilicas. They had simple interiors and examples include Modena Cathedral and Verona Cathedral.

AD 832–1094 – St Mark's Basilica in Venice is built; it is a blend of Classical, Byzantine, Romanesque and Gothic architectural styles.

c. mid-11th century – Orvieto Cathedral is built, with its beautiful and intricate Gothic patterns and frescos.

1136–1382 – Siena Cathedral is constructed, in a similar style to that of Orvieto, but far more Romanesque-Gothic and was an architectural transformer.

=== Renaissance and Baroque ===
Florence Cathedral

early 15th century – late 16th century – The Italian Renaissance begins, being an artistic, political, architectural, cultural and social movement, originating in Tuscany. Italian architecture is heavily influenced from the Classical ideals of ancient Greek and ancient Roman civilizations.

early 15th century - The Renaissance architectural revolution masterpiece, Florence Cathedral. Completed in 1436, it challenged the ideals of architecture and engineering, especially Brunelleschi's dome.

1456–70 – The Florentine church of Santa Maria Novella, which, built by Alberti, was Renaissance, but had a Romanesque-Gothic exterior.

1502–10 – Bramante's iconic "Tempietto" is constructed at San Pietro in Montorio in the city of Rome. Styles were copied from the classical Temple of Vesta.

mid-late 16th century – As a revenge against the Protestant Reformation, the Counter Reformation begins, and most Italian cities, especially Rome, are remodelled with magnificent palazzi, fountains and piazzas, as papal patronage invests on architectural splendour.

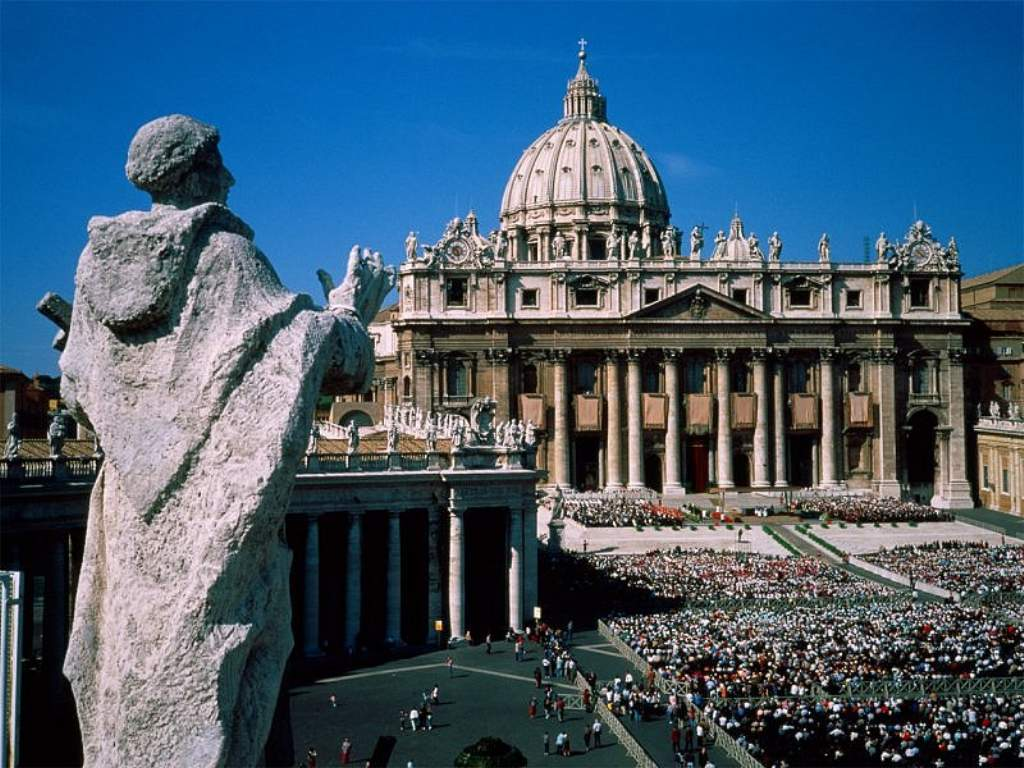
St. Peter's Square

1568 – The Church of the Gesù in Rome is constructed by Vignola. With an elaborate, powerful and austere facade and rich decorations, it was seen as a prototype for Italian Baroque architecture and is regarded as one of the first buildings in the Baroque style.

1508–80 – Andrea Palladio and his Palladian villas are constructed all over the Veneto. His style became a prototype for Neoclassical architecture, and his designs were copied and imitated for centuries across the world.

1598–1680 – Gian Lorenzo Bernini becomes one of Italy's most influential architects and designers during the Roman and Italian Baroque period, re-designing the columns in Saint Peter's Square, Vatican City.

early – mid-18th century – Baroque facades become very popular in churches all over Italy, especially in Southern Italy in cities such as Naples, Lecce, Palermo, Noto, Ragusa and Siracusa. Examples include Cathedral of Syracuse, whose Baroque facade was made from 1728 to 1744.

19th century – The period of industrialisation, new glass and metal structures such as the 1865 Galleria Vittorio Emanuele II in Milan, or the Galleria Umberto I in Naples are constructed.

=== Modern times ===
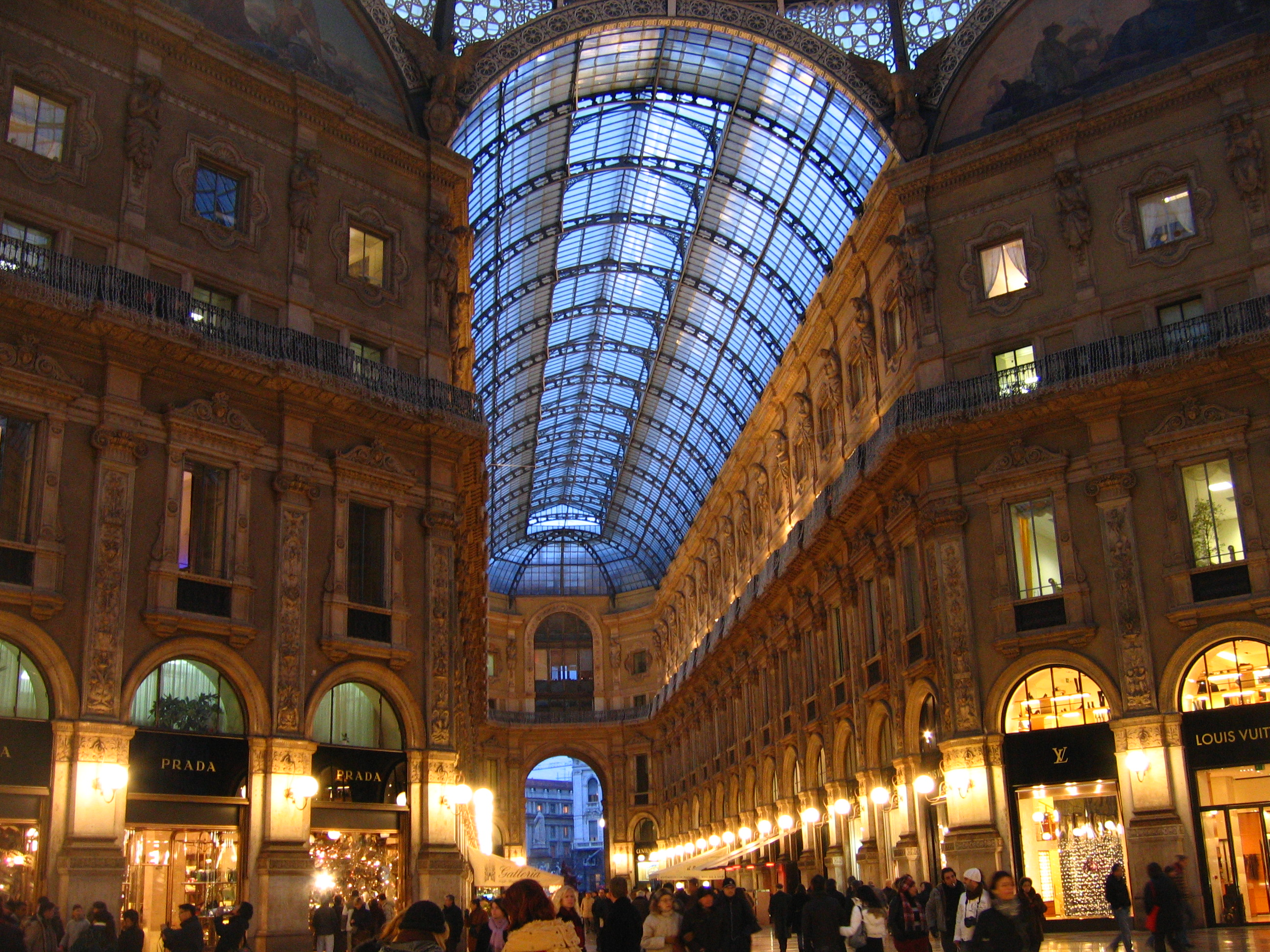
Galleria Vittorio Emanuele II in Milan

1863–89 – The impressive Mole Antonelliana in Turin, originally intended to be a synagogue, is constructed. This towering granite spire was for a period in time the tallest building in the whole world.

1950s – The Italian economic miracle being in full-swing, new skyscrapers such as the creative Torre Velasca in Italy's fashion, banking and design capital was built. This 26-floor tower was a pioneer in the usage of reinforced concrete.

late 1950s and early 1960s – The Pirelli Tower is also built in Milan by Gio Ponti and Nervi. It is regarded as one of the finest examples of modernist Italian architecture, and currently dominates the Milan skyline.

== Bibliography ==
- Italy. Eyewitness Travel. DK. 2005. ISBN 1-4053-0781-1.
