= Italian modern and contemporary architecture =

Italian modern and contemporary architecture refers to architecture in Italy dating from the 20th and 21st centuries.

== Styles ==
Casa del Fascio, Como

Chiesa dell'Autostrada del Sole, near Florence

Chiesa di Dio Padre Misericordioso, Rome

=== Beginning of 20th century ===
The Art Nouveau style was introduced in Italy by figures such as Giuseppe Sommaruga and Ernesto Basile (the former designed the Palazzo Castiglioni and the latter expanded the Palazzo Montecitorio in Rome). The principles of this new style were published in 1914 in the Manifesto dell'Architettura Futurista (Manifesto of Futurist Architecture) by Antonio Sant'Elia. The Italian group of architects Gruppo 7 (1926) embraced Rationalist and Modernist principles. After the dissolution of the group, its most important members became well known: Giuseppe Terragni (Casa del Fascio, Como), Adalberto Libera (Villa Malaparte in Capri) and Giovanni Michelucci (Santa Maria Novella Station in Florence, in collaboration). During the Fascist period, the so-called "Novecento movement" flourished, with architects Gio Ponti, Peter Aschieri, Giovanni Muzio among others. This movement was based on the rediscovery of Imperial Rome. Marcello Piacentini, who was responsible for the urban transformations of several cities in Italy and known for the disputed Via della Conciliazione in Rome, devised a style of simplified Neoclassicism.

=== Fascism ===
The period of time following the end of World War II was marked by several architectural talents, such as Luigi Moretti, Carlo Scarpa, Franco Albini, Giò Ponti, and Tomaso Buzzi, amongst others, with various styles. Pier Luigi Nervi, for example, designed bold concrete structures, and acquired an international reputation. His work influenced Riccardo Morandi and Sergio Musmeci. Through a series of lively debates promoted by critics such as Bruno Zevi, Rationalism ultimately prevailed, with Rome Termini Station standing as a paradigmatic example of the movement."

The neorealism of Giovanni Michelucci (designer of numerous churches in Tuscany), Charles Aymonino, Mario Ridolfi and others (INA-Casa neighbourhoods) was followed by the Neoliberty style (seen in earlier works of Vittorio Gregotti) and Brutalist architecture (Torre Velasca in Milan group BBPR, a residential building via Piagentina in Florence, Leonardo Savioli and works by Giancarlo De Carlo).

=== Modernism ===
Carlo Scarpa executed many modernist projects throughout the Veneto region and particularly in Venice. Le Corbusier and Frank Lloyd Wright did not build anything in Italy. Well known architects with buildings in Italy include: Alvar Aalto (Santa Maria Assunta Church of the Assumption in Riola, Vergato), Kenzo Tange (towers of Bologna Fair, the floor of Naples central business district) and Oscar Niemeyer (home of Mondadori in Segrate). The Postmodern style in architecture, anticipated by Paolo Portoghesi around 1960, can be seen in the "Teatro del Mondo" (Theatre of the World) built by Aldo Rossi for the Venice Biennale of 1980.

Rationalism also influenced Modernism in Italian architecture. Particularly, this design ethos reconciled the modern aesthetic ideals with religion, since this particular motif was not inimical to the priorities of the modern Italian architects. It gave rise to the so-called "secular-spirituality" – an element in Italian modernism – that focuses on the concept of enlightened rationalism. Another aspect of Italian modernism involves the diversity of interpretations with respect to how modernity is experienced. For example, the northern regions interpreted unornamented design as a rejection of culture and style.

=== Post-modernism ===
Parco della Musica in Rome, designed by Renzo Piano, 2016

Well known architects working in Italy between the end of the 20th and the beginning of the 21st centuries include:

- Renzo Piano
  - Stadio San Nicola in Bari
  - Restructuring the Old Port of Genoa
  - Auditorium Parco della Musica in Rome
  - Padre Pio in San Giovanni Rotondo
- Massimiliano Fuksas
  - Skyscraper in the Piedmont region
  - Convention Center in the EUR
- Gae Aulenti
  - The Railway Museum (Naples metro) of Naples underground
- Swiss Mario Botta
  - Museum of Modern and Contemporary Art of Trento and Rovereto
  - Renovation of the Teatro alla Scala in Milan
- Zaha Hadid
  - National Museum of the 21st Century Arts in Rome
  - Skyscraper "Lo Storto" in Milan
- Richard Meier
  - Church of God Merciful Father
  - Casket of the Ara Pacis, in Rome
- Norman Foster
  - Campus Luigi Einaudi in Turin
  - Belfiore station in Florence
- Daniel Libeskind
  - Skyscraper "Il Curvo" in Milan
- Arata Isozaki
  - Palasport Olimpico in Turin, with Pier Paolo Maggiora and Marco Brizio
  - "Il Dritto" skyscraper in Milan

One of the prominent features of the postmodernist architecture in Italy can be identified as a reaction to modernism and to the fascist regime, which appropriated classical architectural forms and modernity. After these periods, there was an identifiable attempt to search for new design directions. Emergent works began to demonstrate atmospheres of nostalgia and memory. A group of young architects such as those who formed the group "La Tendenza" (e.g. Carlo Aymonino, Giorgio Grassi and Aldo Rossi) began to explore the question of memory and the glory of the Italian past, integrating their motifs in their works as physical presence and poetic content. They endeavored to expose the weaknesses of modernism, such as their critique of urbanism.

== See also ==
- Timeline of Italian architecture
