= List of architecture schools in Italy =

The following is a list of architecture schools in Italy:

== Technical Universities (Politecnici) ==
- Marche Polytechnic University, Facoltà di Ingegneria, Ancona
- Politecnico di Bari, Facoltà di Architettura, Bari
- Politecnico di Milano, Facoltà di Architettura, Milan
- Politecnico di Torino, Facoltà di Architettura 1 e 2, Turin

== Universities (Università) ==
- Università di Bologna, Facoltà di Architettura Aldo Rossi, Bologna
- University of Brescia, Facoltà di Ingegneria, Brescia
- University of Camerino, Facoltà di Architettura, Camerino
- University of Cagliari, Facoltà di Architettura, Cagliari
- Università di Catania, Facoltà di Architettura, Syracuse, Sicily
- D'Annunzio University of Chieti–Pescara, Facoltà di Architettura, Pescara
- Kore University of Enna, Facoltà di Architettura, Enna
- Università di Ferrara, Facoltà di Architettura, Ferrara
- Università di Firenze, Facoltà di Architettura, Florence
- University of Genoa, Facoltà di Architettura, Genoa
- University of L'Aquila, Facoltà di Ingegneria, L'Aquila
- Università degli Studi di Napoli Federico II, Facoltà di Architettura, Naples
- Second University of Naples, Facoltà di Architettura, Naples
- University of Padua, Facoltà di Ingegneria, Padua
- University of Palermo, Facoltà di Architettura, Palermo
- University of Parma, Facoltà di Architettura, Parma
- University of Pavia, Facoltà di Ingegneria, Pavia
- University of Pisa, Facoltà di Ingegneria, Pisa
- Basilicata University, Facoltà di Architettura, Potenza
- University of Reggio Calabria, Facoltà di Architettura, Reggio Calabria
- University of Calabria, Facoltà di Ingegneria, Rende
- Sapienza University of Rome, Facoltà di Architettura, Rome
- University of Rome Tor Vergata, Facoltà di Ingegneria, Rome
- Università degli Studi Roma Tre, Facoltà di Architettura, Rome
- University of Salerno, Facoltà di Ingegneria, Salerno
- University of Sannio, Facoltà di Ingegneria, Benevento
- University of Sassari, Facoltà di Architettura, Alghero
- University of Trento, Facoltà di Ingegneria, Trento
- University of Trieste, Facoltà di Architettura, Trieste
- University of Udine, Facoltà di Ingegneria, Udine
- Università IUAV di Venezia, Facoltà di Architettura (FAR), Venice

== See also ==
- List of international architecture schools
- Open access in Italy
