= Adalberto Libera =

Italian architect

Trento, seat of the Regional Council. In the background, the red building is the Grand Hotel by Giovanni Lorenzi.

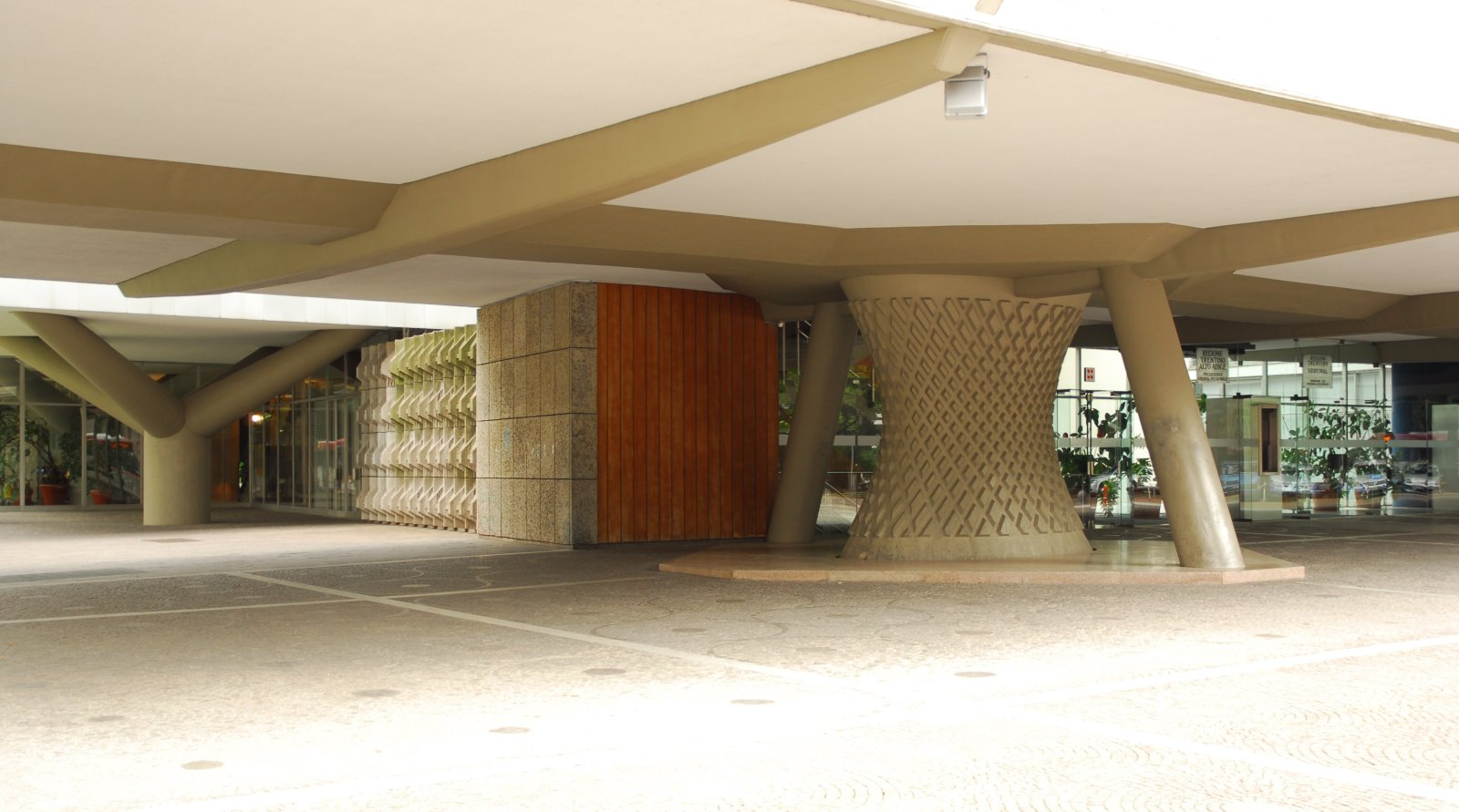
Trento, seat of the Regional Council. Detail of supporting columns.

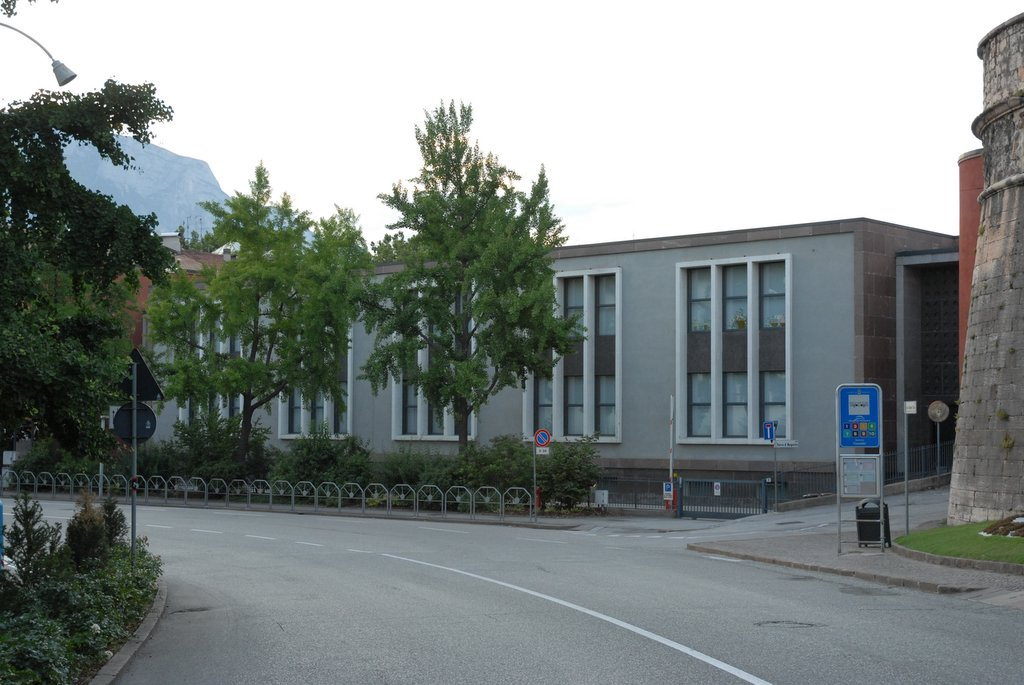
Trento, R. Sanzio Primary School.

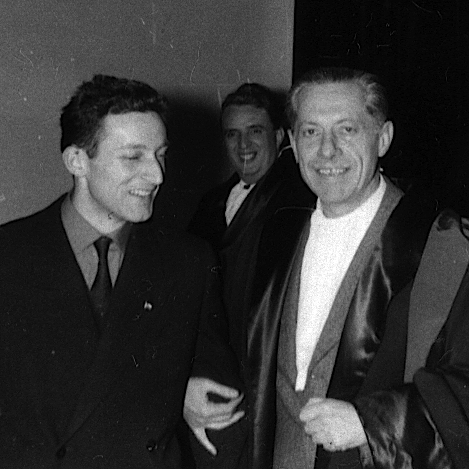
Adalberto Libera as thesis supervisor of Víctor Simonetti.

Adalberto Libera (Italian pronunciation: [adal'bɛrto ˈliːbera]; 16 July 1903 – 17 March 1963) was one of the most representative architects of the Italian Modern movement.

== Biography ==
Adalberto Libera was born in Villa Lagarina in the County of Tyrol of Austria-Hungary (now in Trentino) in northern Italy. He graduated from Parma's Institute of Art in 1925 and then in 1928 from Rome's Scuola Superiore di Architettura he became acquainted with Futurism through his fellow Trentino Fortunato Depero. Even before graduating he was one of the founders of M.I.A.R. (Movimento Italiano per l'Architettura Razionale or “Italian Movement for Rational Architecture”) and later became its secretary. Based in Rome, MIAR was a rival organisation to Gruppo Sette, which was based in Milan and Como. He was invited by Ludwig Mies van der Rohe to the 1927 Stuttgart Exhibition (Deutscher Werkbund). In 1928 and 1931 he organised the MIAR exhibitions of "Architettura Razionale" in Rome. MIAR then dissolved. He also contributed to the 1932 Exhibition of the Fascist Revolution.

An extremely able and talented creative architect more influenced by Futurism than Rationalism, he was also politically astute. His activity as founder and secretary of MIAR enabled him to establish a close working relationship with the high-up officials of the Fascist regime in Rome, where all the big decisions were taken about funding public construction programmes, and who were responsible for commissioning the hundreds of new public buildings required for Mussolini's modernisation programmes. Thanks to these connections he had a prolific career throughout the Fascist regime and designed many notable buildings during the 1930s, some of which are masterpieces of the international modern movement. One of the most important is his Palazzo dei Congressi (Palace of Congress) at the EUR in Rome. This building shows Libera's great ability to design ambiguously in a spare, metaphysical language that sits on a knife-edge between modernism and neo-classicism. His use of sail vaults in this building creates an innovative architectural space.

He also designed Casa Malaparte for Curzio Malaparte on the island of Capri (1938), although there is continuing controversy as to whether Libera himself was the main designer.

During the Fascist period, all architects were legally forced to join the party; but the most successful went further and became important party members. Like his contemporaries Giuseppe Pagano and Giuseppe Terragni, Libera's good fortune in this period was due to his close party links. After the fall of the Fascist regime and its defeat in World War II, Libera along with everyone else underwent a period of personal and professional crisis, but after living quietly for several years in his home town of Trento, he recovered and began again to work on numerous projects, including public housing and office buildings, in a new style that turned its back on Fascistic modes of expression. Many of his greatest projects are from this postwar period.

In 1954–1962 he designed and built the Regional Government building for the Trentino Region in Trento.

== Main works ==
- Palace of Congresses, EUR (1930s)
- Post Office, via Marmorata, Rome (1932)
- Casa Malaparte, Island of Capri (1938)
- Housing Units, Cagliari (1950–1953)
- Cassa del Mezzogiorno, Cagliari (1953)
- Main Cathedral, Spezia (1956–1969)

== See also ==
- Italian Rationalism
- Modernism
