= Casa Malaparte =

House in Capri, Italy

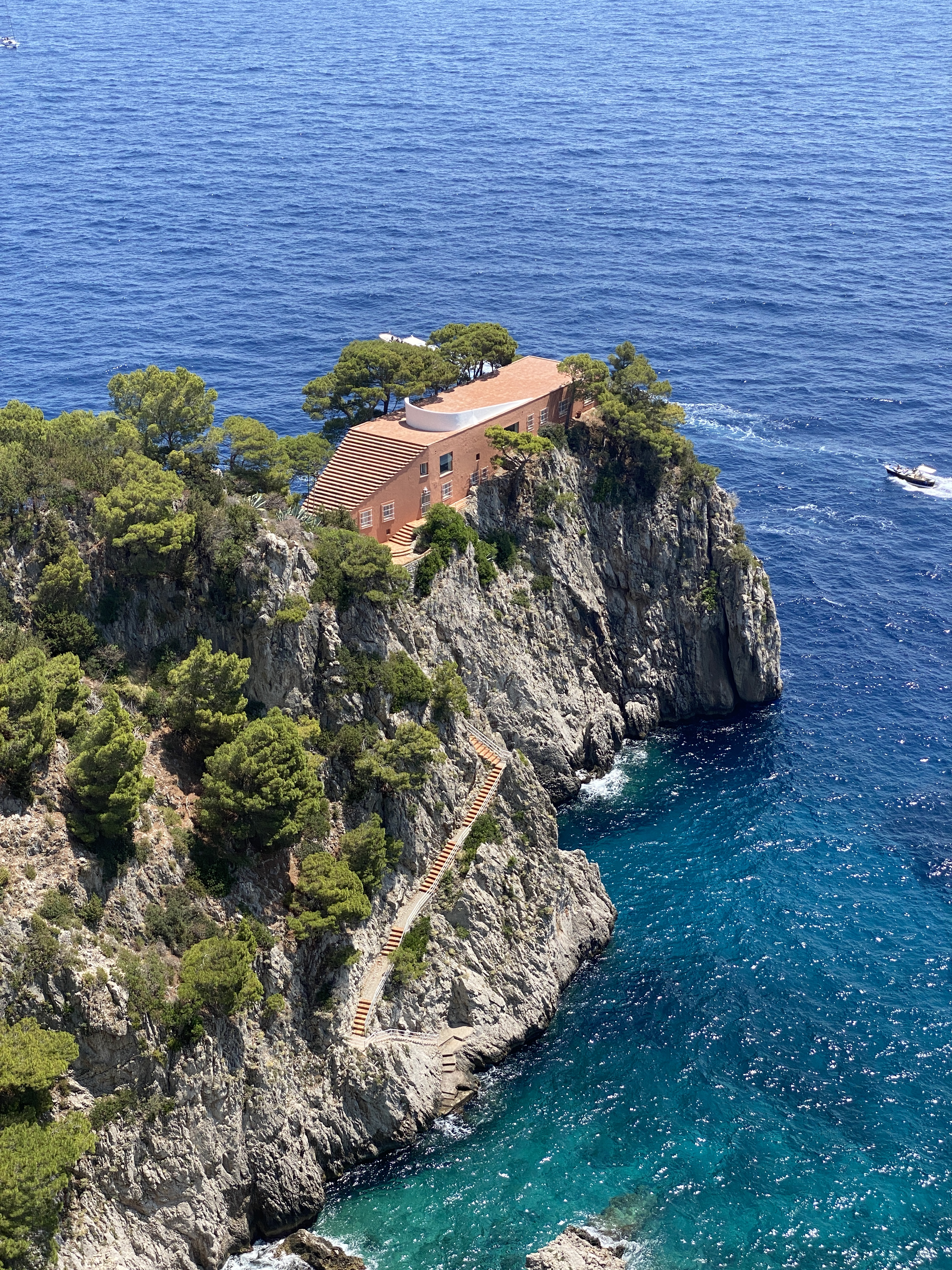
- View of Villa Malaparte
- Interactive map of the Casa Malaparte area
- Alternative names: Villa Malaparte, Malaparte House

General information
- Type: Private house
- Architectural style: Modern architecture
- Location: Isle of Capri, Italy
- Coordinates: 40°32′49″N 14°15′33″E
- Current tenants: Giorgio Ronchi Foundation
- Construction started: 1937
- Renovated: 1980–90
- Client: Curzio Malaparte

Design and construction
- Architects: Curzio Malaparte and Adalberto Libera

Casa Malaparte (also Villa Malaparte) is a house on Punta Massullo, on the eastern side of the isle of Capri, Italy. It is considered to be one of the best examples of Italian modern and contemporary architecture.

The house was conceived around 1937 by Curzio Malaparte. Malaparte built the home himself with the help of Adolfo Amitrano, a local stonemason.

== Description ==
Casa Malaparte is a red masonry box with reverse pyramidal stairs leading to the roof patio. On the roof is a freestanding curving white wall of increasing height. It sits on a dangerous cliff 32 metres above the sea overlooking the Gulf of Salerno. Access to this private property is either by foot from the town of Capri or by boat and a staircase cut into the cliff. Casa Malaparte's interior and exterior (particularly the rooftop patio) are prominently featured in Jean-Luc Godard's 1963 film, Contempt (Le Mépris).

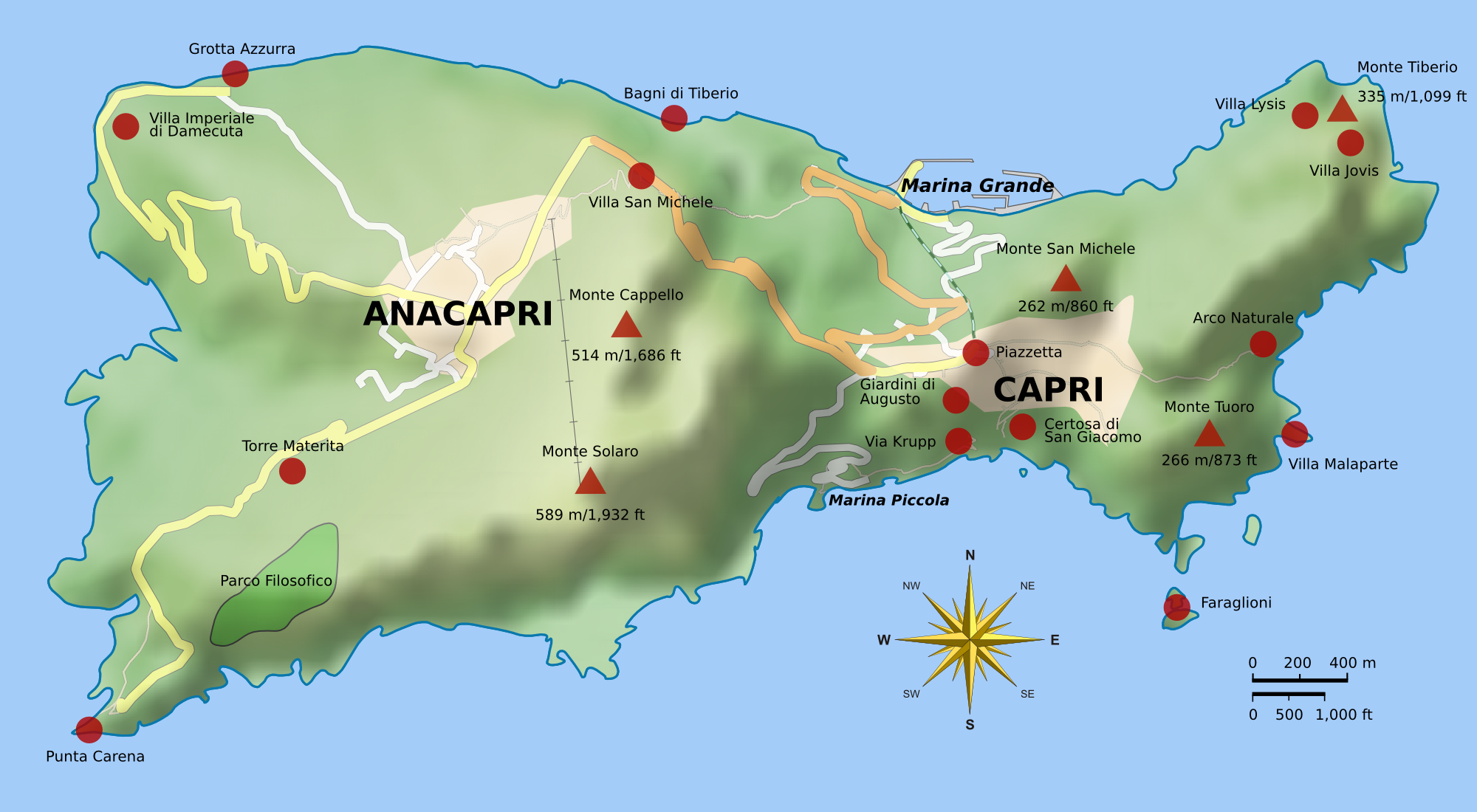
Map of Capri with Villa Malaparte in the East corner of the island

== Renovation ==
The house entrance access was carved itself through the outside staircase in its center but the owner bricked the entrance and moved it to the side of the house in 1940. Casa Malaparte was abandoned and neglected after the death of Curzio Malaparte in 1957. It suffered vandalism and unmitigated exposure to the elements for many years and was seriously damaged, including the desecration of a cocklestove, before the first serious renovation started in the late 1980s and early 1990s. The building was donated to the Giorgio Ronchi Foundation in 1972.

Malaparte's great-nephew, Niccolò Rositani, was primarily responsible for restoring the house to a livable state. Much of the original furniture is still there, because it is too large to remove. The marble sunken bath in the bedroom of his mistress still exists and functions. His bedroom and book-lined study are still intact. Many Italian industrialists have donated materials for the preservation.

Today the house is used for serious study and cultural events. The furniture of the house was the subject of an exhibition at the Gagosian Gallery in London in 2020.

== Access ==
The house can only be reached by traversing the island. The last twenty-minute walk is over private property, belonging to the Giorgio Ronchi Foundation. It takes an hour and a half to walk there from Capri's Piazzetta at the summit of the funicular from the Marina Grande. The house can be reached by sea, on calm days only, as the waves are cast upon treacherous rocks and there has not been an official pier for many years. From the sea, one must climb 99 steps to reach the house. Malaparte gave his friend and boatman money to open a restaurant which is run by the boatman's son today. It is the only restaurant one would pass on the path from the Piazzetta to the promontory where Tiberius built his palace, Villa Jovis.

The book Malaparte: Casa come me (A House Like Me), edited by Michael McDonough, includes drawings and essays by many prominent artists, architects, and others, including James Wines, Tom Wolfe, Robert Venturi, Emilio Ambasz, Ettore Sottsass, Michael Graves, Willem Dafoe, Peter Eisenman, Wiel Arets and Colman Andrews.

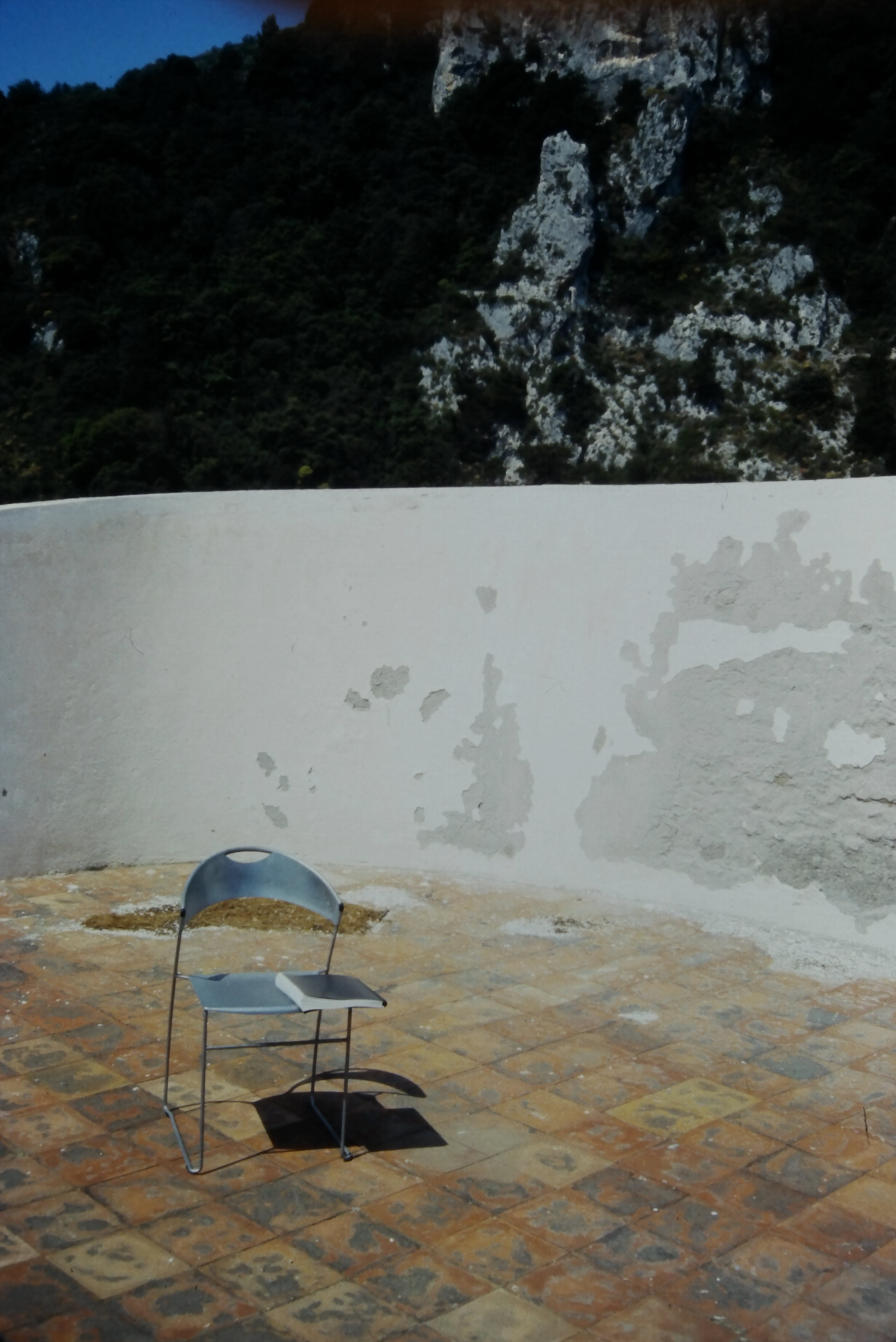
Roof Terrace with Freestanding Curving Wall
