= Balducci =

Balducci may refer to:

== People ==
=== In arts and media ===
- Alfredo Balducci (1920–2011), Italian playwright
- Charlie Balducci (1975–2020), American actor
- Ed Balducci (1906–1988), magician
- Franco Balducci (1922–2001), Italian film actor
- Giovanni Balducci, called Il Cosci (c.1560—c.1631), Florentine mannerist painter
- Giovanni Balducci (essayist)
- Giuseppe Balducci (composer) (1796–1845), Italian composer
- Lorenzo Balducci (born 1982), Italian actor
- Michele Balducci, Italian actor
- Pierluigi Balducci (born 1971), Italian jazz musician and composer
- Richard Balducci (director) (1922–2015) French director, screenwriter and writer
- Jason White known as Balducci, guitarist

=== Clergy ===
- Antonio Balducci, O.P. (died 1580), Roman Catholic prelate who served as Bishop of Trevico
- Monsignor Corrado Balducci (1923–2008), Roman Catholic theologian of the Vatican Curia
- Father Ernesto Balducci (1922–1992), Italian Roman Catholic priest and peace activist

=== In politics ===
- Claudia Balducci, American politician from the state of Washington
- Paola Balducci (born 1949), Italian politician and lawyer, former member of the CSM

=== In sport ===
- Alex Balducci (born 1994), American football guard
- Alice Balducci (born 1986), Italian tennis player
- Daniele Balducci (born 1970), former professional tennis player from Italy
- Eduardo Balducci (born 1932), Argentine runner
- Gabriele Balducci, Italian professional racing cyclist, for the Acqua & Sapone-Caffè Mokambo team
- Michela Balducci (born 1995), Italian professional racing cyclist

== Fictional characters ==
- "Balducci, bass role in Benvenuto Cellini (opera)

== See also ==
- Balducci's, American specialty-food retailer chain
- Francesco Balducci Pegolotti (active 1310–1347), Florentine merchant and politician
- Balducci levitation, an illusion first described by Ed Balducci
