= Giuseppe Balducci =

Giuseppe Balducci may refer to:

- Giuseppe Balducci (composer) (1796–1845), Italian composer
- Giuseppe Balducci (literary critic) (born 1992), Italian literary critic

== See also ==
- Giuseppe Baldacci, Italian architect
