= Baldacci =

Baldacci is a surname. Notable people with the surname include:

- Antonio Baldacci (botanist) (1867–1950), Italian scholar, botanist, and geographer
- Antonio Baldacci (rower) (born 1951), Italian rower
- David Baldacci (born 1960), American novelist
- Joe Baldacci (born 1965), American attorney and Democratic politician
- John Baldacci (born 1955), American politician. 73rd Governor of the U.S. state of Maine (2003–2011)
- Giovanna Bruna Baldacci (1886–?), Italian musician and poet
- Giuseppe Baldacci (1856–?), Italian architect
- Lou Baldacci (born 1934), American football player
- Maria Maddalena Baldacci (1718–1782), Italian painter
- Mirco Baldacci (born 1977), Sammarinese rally driver
- Paul Baldacci (1907–1984), American football player

== Other uses ==
- Baldacci Family Vineyards, a California winery
