= Baldinucci =

Baldinucci is a surname. Notable people with the surname include:

- Anthony Baldinucci (1665–1717), an Italian Jesuit priest and missionary
- Filippo Baldinucci (1625–1696), an Italian art historian and biographer
- Pietro Paolo Baldinucci, Italian painter of the Renaissance, active in Gubbio

== See also ==
- Artists in biographies by Filippo Baldinucci (1610–1670), major art biography of Baroque painters
- Baldini
- Balducci (disambiguation)
