= Bengasi Centrale railway station =

Former railway station in Benghazi, Libya

Bengasi Centrale
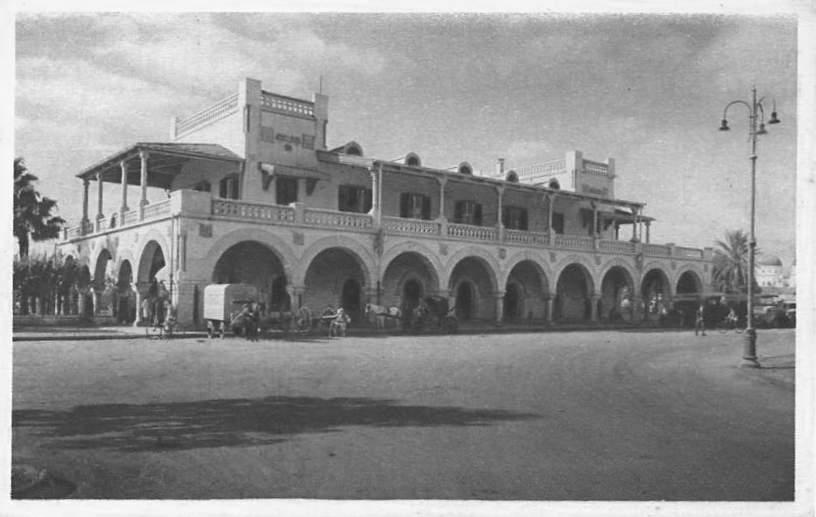
- Bengasi Centrale railway station in the 1930s

General information
- Location: Benghazi; Libya
- Coordinates: 32°06′47.92″N 20°03′54.22″E
- Lines: Bengasi–Barce; Bengasi–Soluch

Construction
- Architect: Marcello Piacentini

History
- Opened: 1916; 110 years ago
Location
- Location within Libya

Bengasi Centrale was the main railway station of the city of Benghazi, in Cyrenaica, Libya, during the Italian colonial period.

== History ==
Construction of the railway in Cyrenaica began in 1914, and the Benghazi railway station was built and opened in 1916. Designed by architect Marcello Piacentini, the passenger building was a twin of that of Tripoli Centrale railway station. By about 1927 the network reached roughly 160 km, running east from Benghazi to Barce (108 km) and south to Soluch (56 km).

The station was destroyed in 1943.

== See also ==
- Tripoli Centrale railway station
