= Matarazzo Building =

- Edifício Matarazo
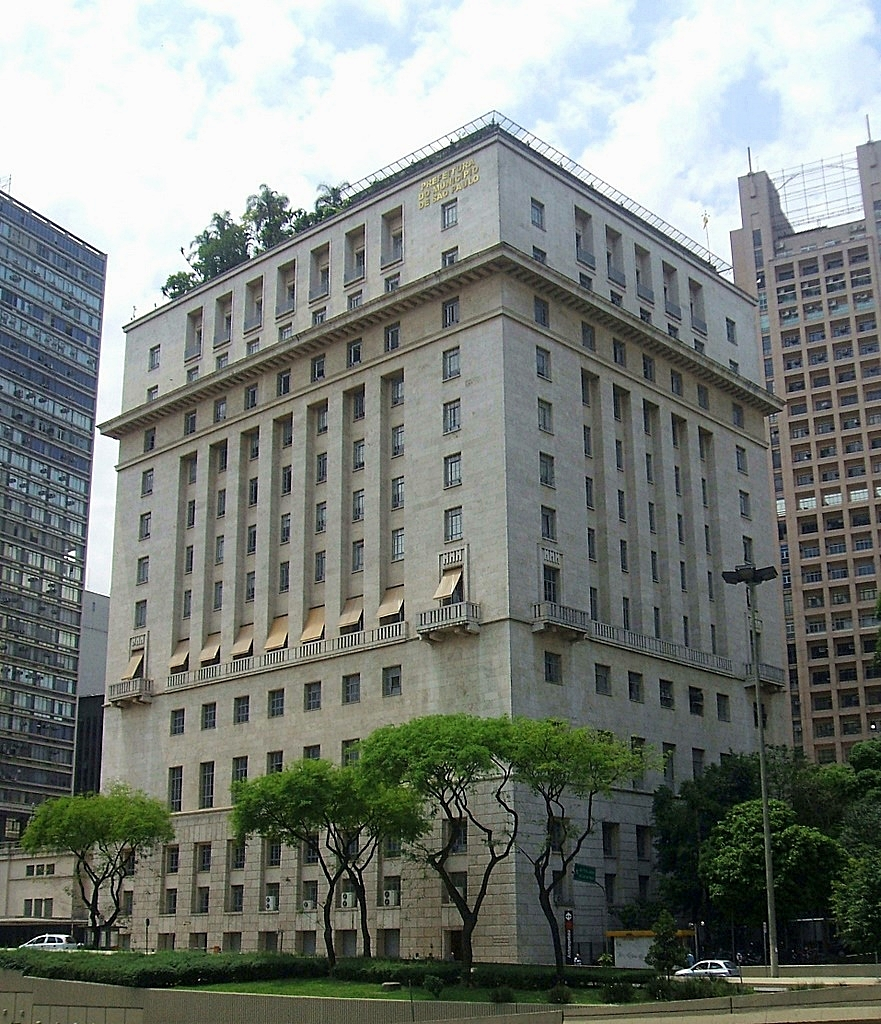
- The Palácio do Anhangabaú in the center of the city.

- Location within São Paulo Matarazzo Building (Brazil)
- Alternative names: Anhangabaú Palace (Portuguese: Palácio Anhangabaú)

General information
- Type: Palace
- Architectural style: Italian rationalism
- Location: São Paulo, Brazil, Viaduto do Chá, 15
- Coordinates: 23°32′51.64″S 46°38′15.32″W
- Current tenants: Mayor of São Paulo
- Construction started: 1937
- Completed: 1939
- Inaugurated: 1939

Height
- Height: 46 m (151 ft)

Technical details
- Floor count: 14

Design and construction
- Architect: Marcello Piacentini

Other information
- Public transit access: Anhangabaú

Matarazzo Building (Portuguese: Edifício Matarazzo), also known as Palácio do Anhangabaú (Anhangabaú Palace), is the city hall of the city of São Paulo, Brazil. It belonged to Banespa until 2004, when it was sold to the city government. It was designed by Italian architect Marcello Piacentini under the will of Ermelino Matarazzo, in order to host the headquarters of his industries. The building's architectural style looks like Art Deco.

According to the deal made with Banespa, the building would be given to the city government as part of the debt of 885 million reais (some 466 million dollars) that the extinct CMTC had with the bank. The city would then owe 156 million reais, to be paid in four years.
