= Benghazi Municipal Hall =

Building in Benghazi, Libya

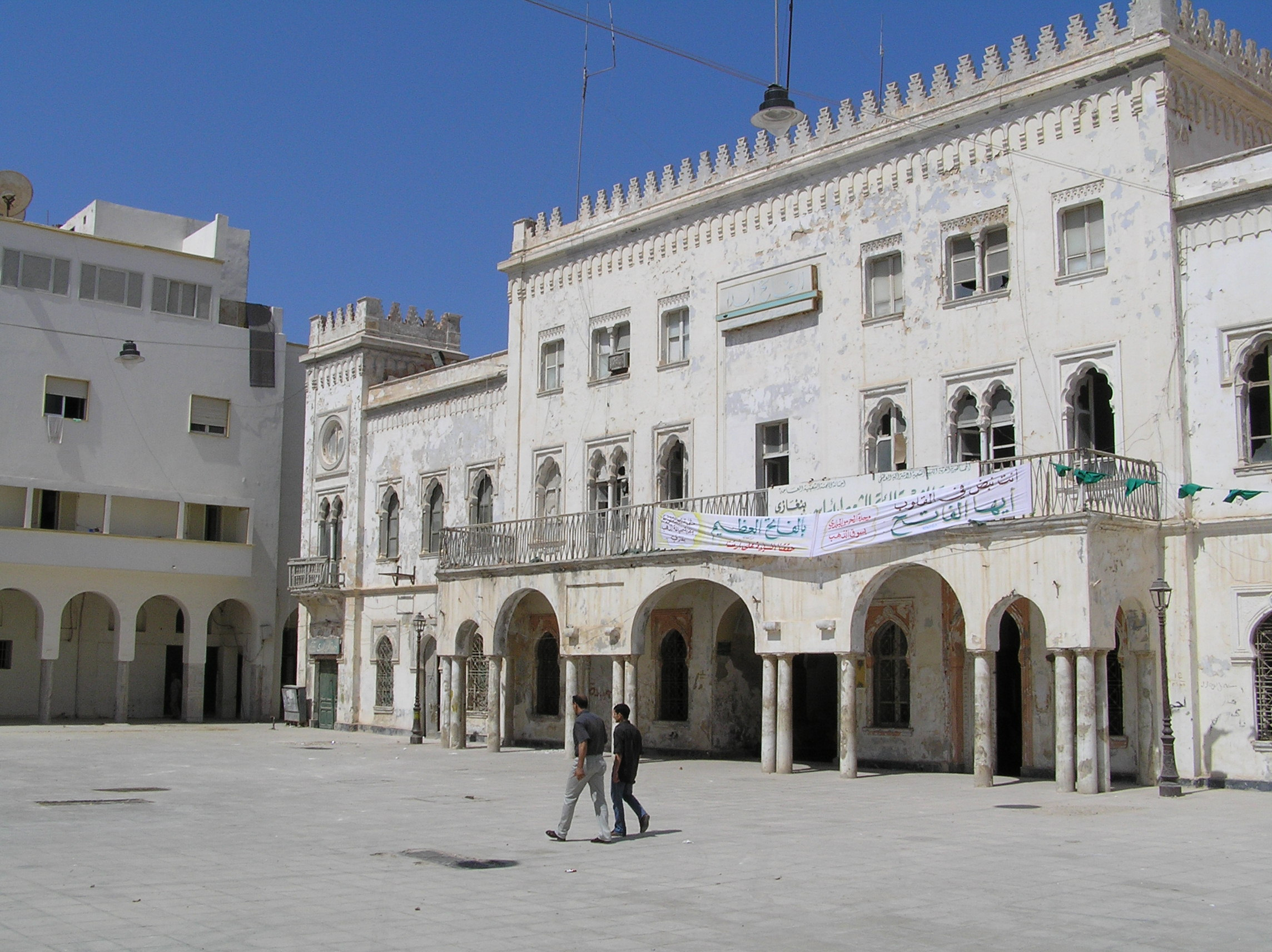
- Benghazi Municipal Hall in 2005
- Click on the map for a fullscreen view

General information
- Location: Benghazi, Libya
- Coordinates: 32°07′17.22″N 20°03′38.59″E

Benghazi Municipal Hall (Italian: Municipio di Bengasi) is the former town hall of Benghazi, Libya. It is located in the center of the Italian quarter in Maydan al-Baladia (Municipality Square) and is currently disused and due to undergo renovation work.

== History ==
Vintage view

The building, designed by Marcello Piacentini and Ivo Lebboroni, was constructed between 1923 and 1925, replacing the older and more modest Turkish Beledia, which was demolished to make way for the new structure. Piacentini was responsible, among other elements, for the building's pronaos, characterized by Tuscan columns, while Ivo Lebboroni designed the façade decorations.

== Description ==
The building is the creation of several architects and designers. The portico of the facade and the interiors were designed by Marcello Piacentini, while the facades were designed by the architect Ivo Lebboroni. The interior frescoes are the work of Guido Cadorin, while the chandeliers are by Umberto Bellotto. The furniture inside the town hall was designed by the company Ducrot.

== See also ==
- Town Hall
