= Museo Nazionale della Magna Grecia =

Museum in Reggio Calabria, Italy

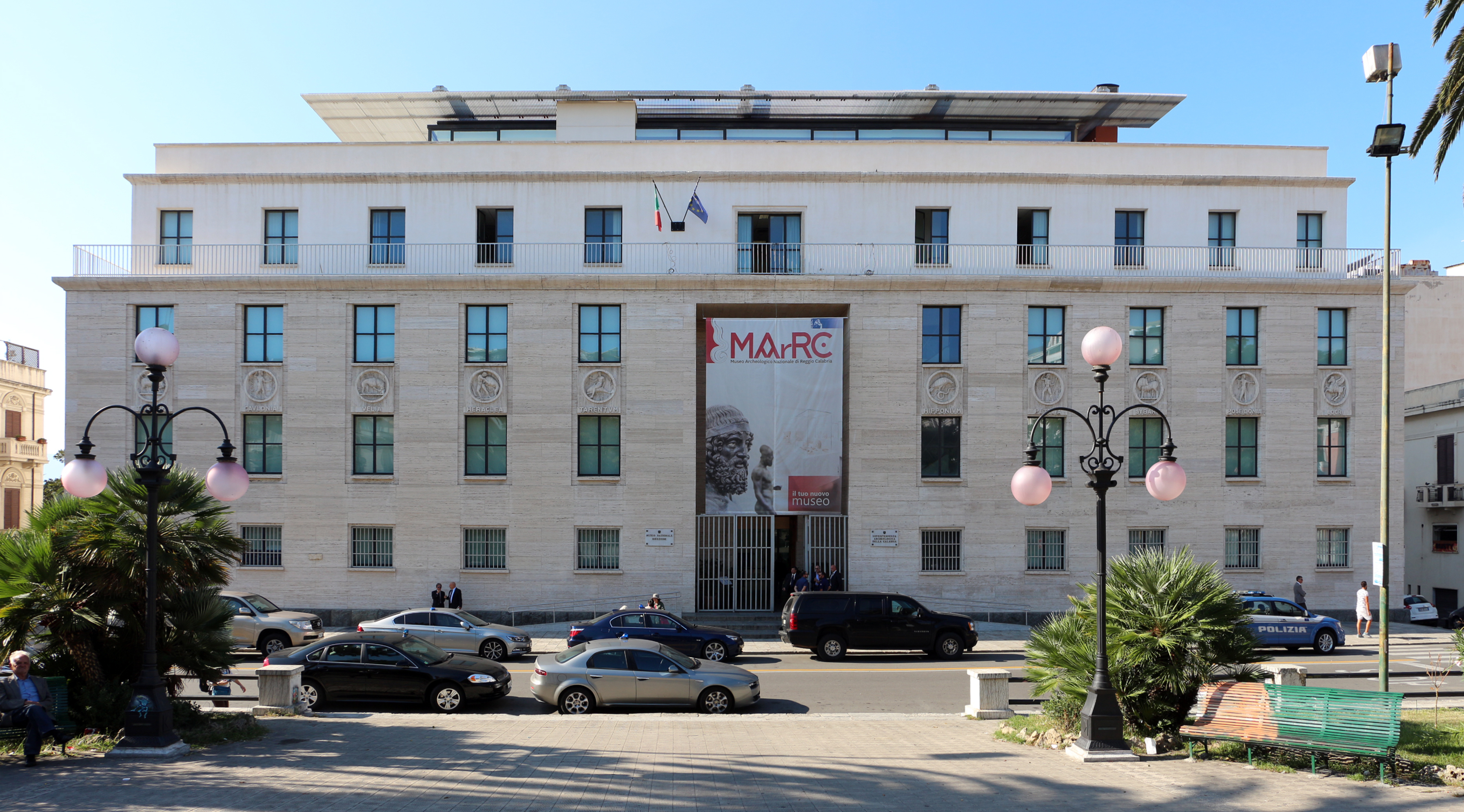
- The Palazzo Piacentini which houses the museum

- Location within Italy
- Established: 1882
- Location: Palazzo Piacentini, Piazza De Nava, 26-89100 Reggio Calabria, Italy
- Coordinates: 38°06′53″N 15°39′04″E
- Website: museoarcheologicoreggiocalabria.it

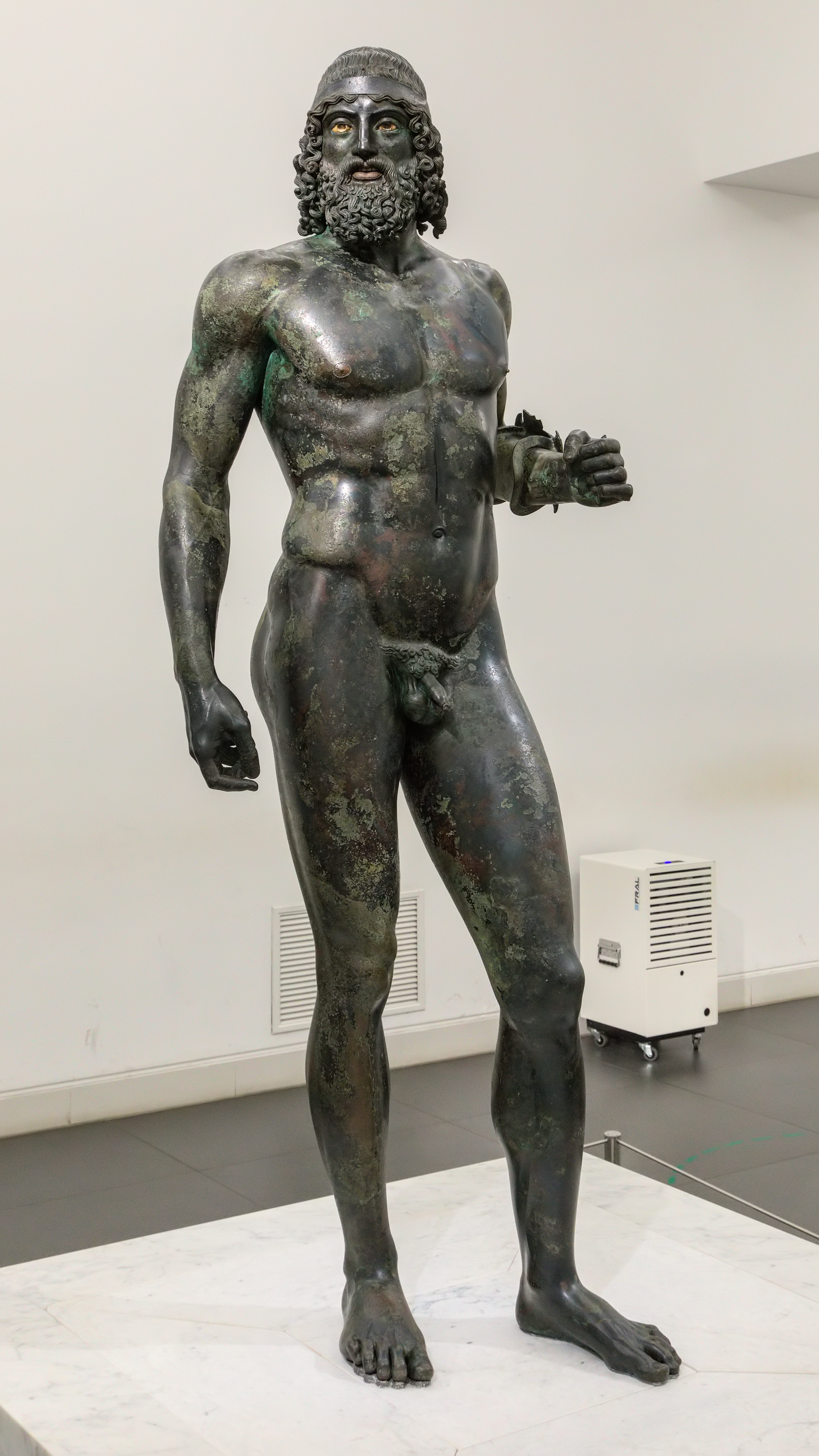
One of the two Riace bronzes

The Museo Nazionale della Magna Grecia (National Museum of Magna Græcia), Museo Archeologico Nazionale di Reggio Calabria (National Archaeological Museum of Reggio Calabria) or Palazzo Piacentini is a museum in Reggio Calabria, southern Italy, housing an archaeological collection from sites in Magna Graecia.

Initially formed with a nucleus of material ceded from the city's Museo Civico in the 19th century, the Museo Archeologico Nazionale della Magna Grecia then grew via many discoveries in various excavation campaigns in the ancient city-states of Calabria, Basilicata and Sicily by the Soprintendenza Archeologica della Calabria right up to the present day, including the Riace bronzes. It is extremely important for studies of the 8th century BC, but also has several objects from the prehistoric and protohistoric periods which preceded it and the ancient Roman and Byzantine eras which followed. Today new finds in Calabria are no longer displayed and conserved in a single museum, but exhibited where they have been found, since the quantity of new discoveries has allowed smaller local museums to be set up for them (at Crotone, Locri, Roccelletta di Borgia, Sibari, Vibo Valentia and Lamezia Terme). These are taken together as the museo reggino.

== The Museo Nazionale ==
The most notable of its collections include:

- The two large, well-preserved 5th century BC Riace bronzes, found in the province of Reggio, are thought to be the most significant bronze sculptures from the Greek period and among the few survivors of works by its master sculptors. Recent studies suggest they may represent Tydeus and Amphiaraus from a larger group of the Seven against Thebes.
- The Head of a Philosopher from Porticello is a rare example of Greek portraiture
- The marble Reggio Kouros is a recent acquisition by the museum (shown at the 2006 Winter Olympics at Turin as the archetype of a victorious Greek athlete)
- A marble head of Apollo, from Cirò
- The group of the Dioscuri falling from their horse in the battle of Sagra, from Epizephyrian Locris
- The bronze tables, from the archive of the temple of Zeus at Epizephyrian Locris
- The vast collection of pinakes, terracotta ex votos/ with the rape of Persephone from Epizephyrian Locris
- A rich collection of jewellery, bronze mirrors, coins and medals.

The city art gallery or Pinacoteca comunale was housed in the Museum until a dedicated structure for it was completed in 2008. It includes the two St. Jerome and Abraham panels by Antonello da Messina.

=== Palazzo Piacentini ===
The building was designed by Marcello Piacentini (from whom it takes its name) and built between 1932 and 1941. Characterised by its massive volume and monumentality, it consists of a ground floor in 'bugnato' black lava stone, linking the different heights of the Corso Garibaldi and the Via Vittorio Veneto. On this rest grand travertine pilasters and large windows for the first floor exhibition galleries. These large windows make the galleries open, airy and light and allow smoother and more continuous routes between them. On the main facade is a series of large illustrations of the ancient currencies of the cities of Magna Graecia. After the opening many rooms on the ground floor were also opened to the public as galleries (though not designed as such) and today the Museum occupies all the available space on all the floors (three floors and a basement).

=== Floors ===
- ground floor:

Prehistory and Protohistory, with objects from Calabria
the first of two sections on the colonies of Magna Grecia, with objects from digs at Epizephyrian Locris;

- first floor:

section part of the section on colonies, with objects from digs at Rhegion, Matauros, Medma, Kaulon, and other digs in progress;
numismatics;
Roman and Byzantine;

- second floor:

the Pinacoteca comunale, awaiting a dedicated building;

- basement:

underwater archaeology section, set up in 1981, including a vast collection of anchors and amphorae as well as the Riace bronzes and the Porticello Bronzes.

== History of the museum ==
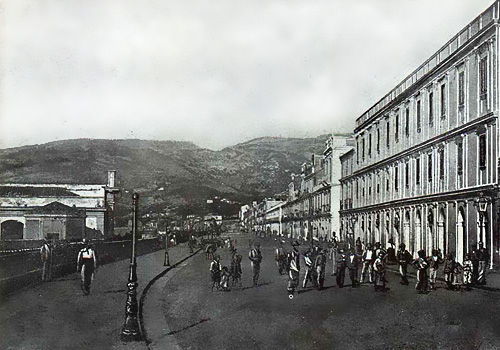
The Real Palazzina, series of buildings that housed the original Museo Civico.

The origins of the Museo Nazionale di Reggio Calabria dates back to 1882 with the foundation of the Museo Civico which, in the new climate of national unity, collected and spread culture to local people by exhibiting paintings, objects of local history and culture, archeological finds, and mementoes of Il Risorgimento. This formed the Museo Civico di Reggio, based in the seafront Palazzo Arcivescovile and formed of ethnology, medieval art, modern art, Risorgimento art and numismatic departments. In 1907 the Soprintendenza Archeologica della Calabria was founded under the leadership of the famous archaeologist Paolo Orsi - it carried out intense excavations at Reggio, Locri, and in the main centres of archeological interest in Calabria. After the earthquake of 1908, which destroyed the city, Paolo Orsi suggested the creation of a National Museum, to exhibit objects from state excavations alongside those from Reggio's city collections.

The Soprintendenza Archeologica was set up in 1925 in Reggio and in 1932 it initiated construction of the building for the Museo Centrale della Magna Grecia or Museo Nazionale della Magna Grecia. It was designed by Marcello Piacentini, one of the most famous Italian architects of the first half of the 20th century, who created Italy's first purpose-built museum building (rather than a museum set up in an existing building). Its first stone was blessed by archbishop Carmelo Pujia, and then laid by the prince of Piedmont, with the following letter walled into it:

"In the august presence of HRH Umberto and Maria Josè of Savoy, with solemn ritual and popular celebration, during the month of May in the tenth year of the Fascist Era, [this museum was] given to the Fatherland by Benito Mussolini. [Umberto] laid the first stone of this Museum, whose treasures survived great destructive adversities and perpetuate the Millennial civilisation of the First Italy."

The new building opened in 1932 but closed on the outbreak of the Second World War, which led to its objects being transferred to safer locations. The new headquarters were inaugurated in 1932 but were then closed up because of the war, which forced the transfer of the materials to safer sites. In 1954, the collections of the Museo Civico were reunited with those of the Museo Nazionale, which was re-opened to the public in 1959. In 1962, the prehistory, protohistory and Locri rooms were opened, whilst the lapidary gallery and art gallery were opened in 1969 and the numismatic gallery in 1973.

After the very important find of the Riace Bronzes (which, along with the Head of a Philosopher, have contributed to the museum's reputation) an underwater archaeology gallery was created in 1981, dedicated to the memory of superintendent Giuseppe Foti, who died just before its opening. In 1982 the galleries on the Greek colonies and Ionic and Tyrrhenian sub-colonies were re-arranged, thus opening the first and second floor to the public and adding 40 more galleries. There are now plans to move the medieval and modern art galleries (currently on the second floor) to another building to make room for thematic archaeological displays which are in preparation. The museum is currently divided into six sections and an art gallery, arranged in chronological and topographic order and spread over 4 floors.

== Collections ==
The entrance is from Piazza De Nava and the visitor is immediately welcomed by the view of a tuff Telamone, coming from a public building from the 2nd century BC and found at Montescaglioso.

=== Prehistory and Protohistory ===
This section, which was recently reorganized with modern didactical criteria and with the construction of various rooms, collects Calabrian materials of sure date and origin, prehistoric findings (which come from stratified excavations) presented in chronological order through the documentation from the different sites, and displayed in the long room dedicated to them.

The most antique objects, coming from the Lower Paleolithic date back to 600,000 years ago, are "choppers" (splintered rocks), found near Casella di Maida in the center of Calabria.

At the entrance of the room are two large dioramas with life scenes from the people of the Middle and Upper Paleolithic. Next, there is the reproduction of the engraving representing the Bos Primigenius a bovid dating back around 11,000 years ago (thus from the final part of the Upper Paleolithic). It was discovered on a boulder in 1961, together with two other smaller figures and many linear signs, at the Riparo del Romito in the municipality of Papasidero, along the river valley Lao, which is at the border with Basilicata. The reproduction of the engraving has a great artistic value (beside its historical value) because the assurance of the line and the tridimensional effect make it the most significant figure, among all those found in the Mediterranean Sea, of the Paleolithic realism.

Next to the engraving, simulating what was found at the Romito, a tomb has been recreated, in which one can see the skeletons of two people who have been buried contemporaneously in an unusual position, laying side by side and partially overlapping. The female skeleton laying underneath slips her left arm, as if in an affectionate gesture, around the neck of the young man partially above her who, as it is visible, is deformed by rickets. Maybe these are the skeletons of the guardians, pro tempore, of this sacred place, which has bovine engravings that are the images used during the rites before the hunt.

Continuing further we find another diorama constructed to show scenes of life of the Neolithic (8,000- 5,000 years ago), followed by some show windows exhibiting terracotta, bronze, and iron objects, such as: vases, pitchers, calices, ax, swords and fibula, which go from the Neolithic to the next ages, coming from Calabrian places such as: Praia a Mare, Torre Galli, Santa Domenica di Ricadi, Roccella Ionica, Amendolara, Cassano allo Ionio.

=== Colonies ===
==== Epizephyrian Locris ====
===== Ionic Temple and Dioscuri group =====
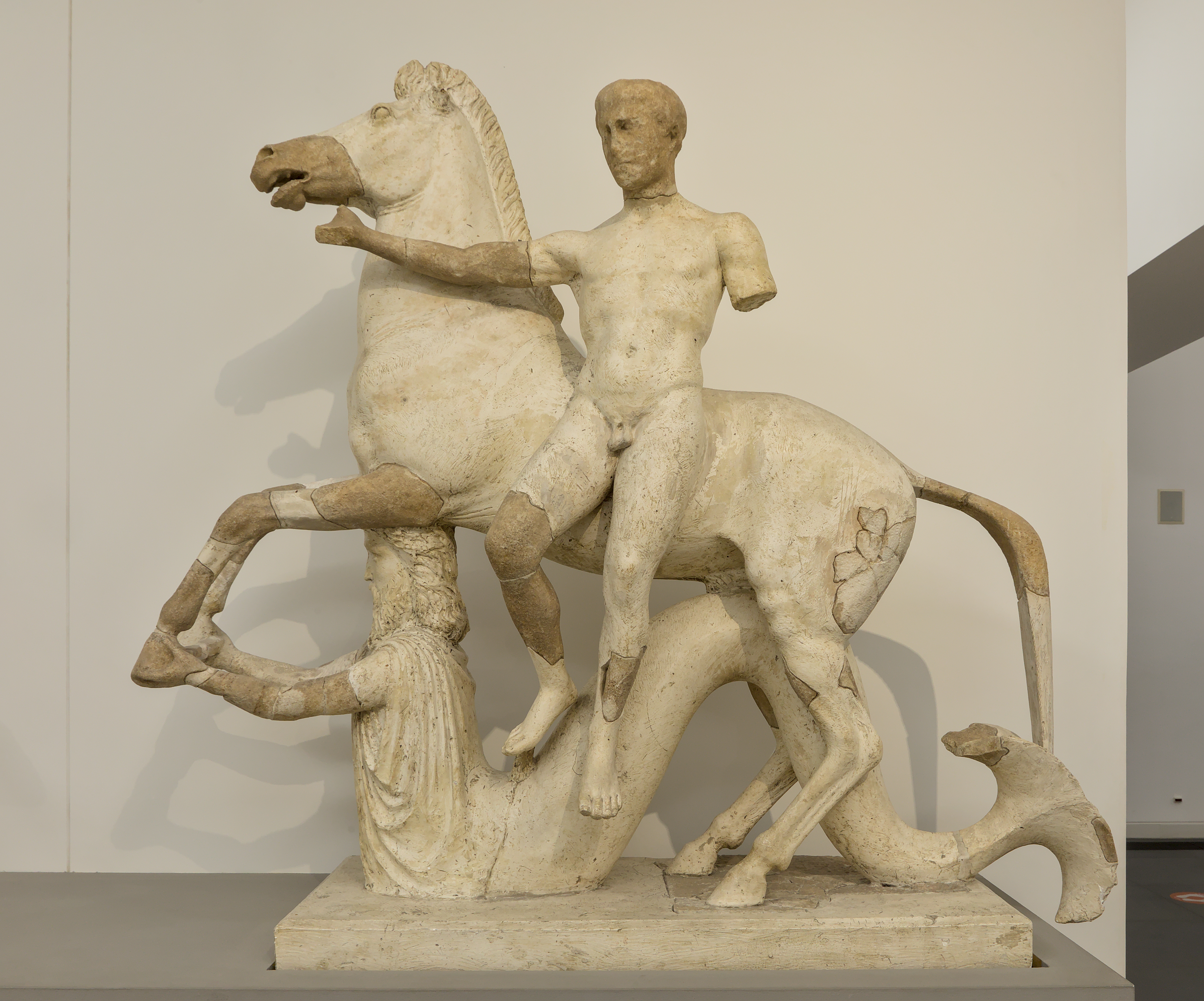
The Dioscuri group, 5th century BC

==== Rhegion (Reggio) ====
===== Reggio Kouros =====
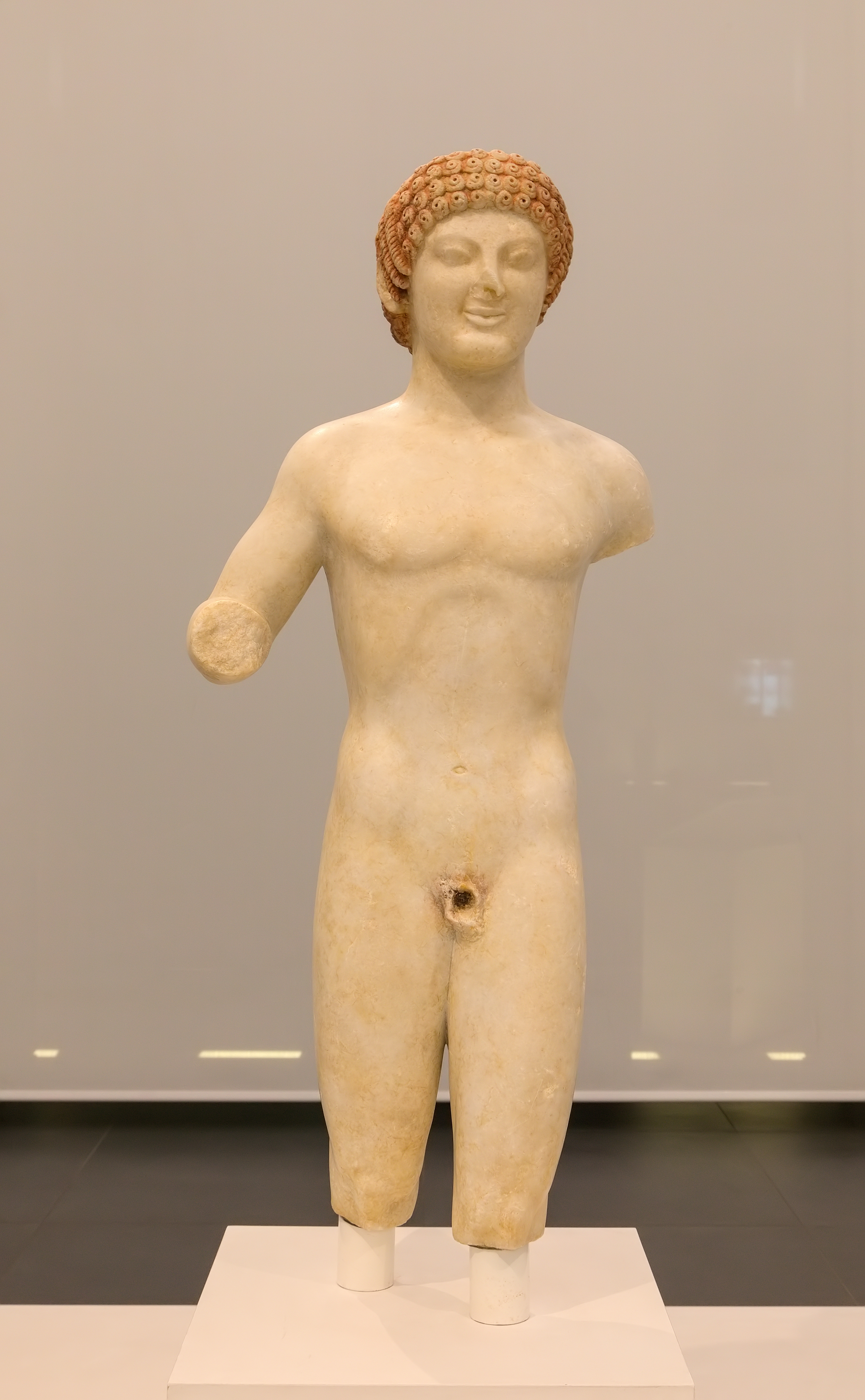
The Reggio Kouros, around 500 BC

=== Art gallery ===
The art collection has been relocated to the Pinacoteca Civica, in the former foyer of the city theatre.

=== Underwater archaeology ===
==== Porticello bronzes ====
===== Head of the Basilea =====
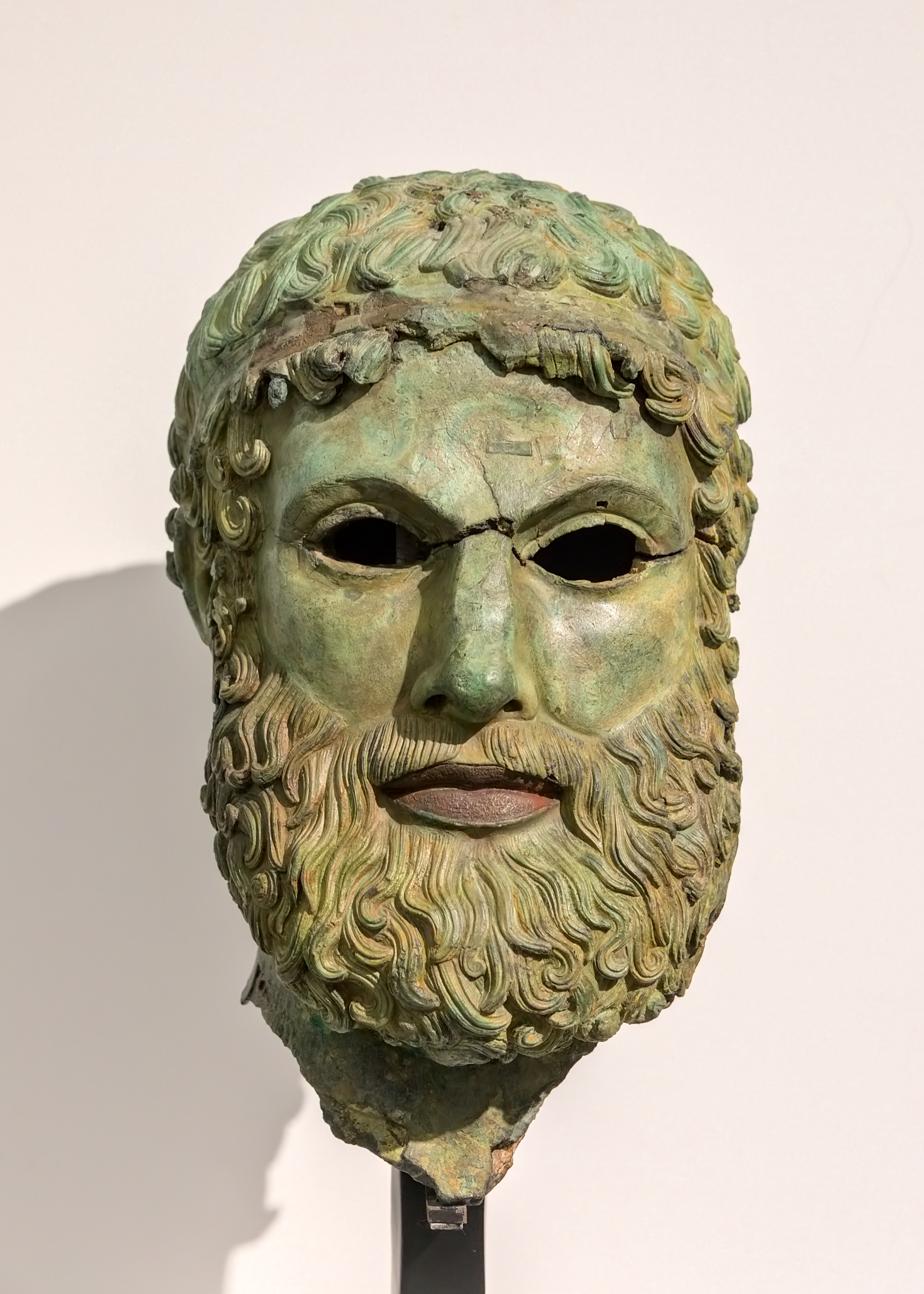
Head of the Basilea, 5th century BC

== Bibliography ==
- AAVV. Il Museo Nazionale di Reggio Calabria. Laruffa, Reggio Calabria, 2004. ISBN 978-8874484751
- Paolo Enrico Arias. Cinquanta anni di ricerche archeologiche sulla Calabria (1937–1987). Rovito, 1988.
- Daniele Castrizio, Maria Rosaria Fascì, Renato G. Laganà. Reggio Città d'Arte.
- Giulio Iacopi. L'organizzazione del Museo Nazionale di Reggio Calabria (Museo Centrale della Magna Grecia). Estratto da: Almanacco del Turista, 1953.
- Giuseppe Foti. I bronzi di Riace. Novara, 1985.
- Giuseppe Foti, Francesco Nicosia. I bronzi di Riace, dal Centro di restauro della Soprintendenza archeologica della Toscana al Museo nazionale di Reggio Calabria. Firenze, Italia grafiche, 1981.
- Giuseppe Foti. Il Museo nazionale di Reggio Calabria. Napoli, Di Mauro, 1972. BNI 733791.
- Domenico Laruffa. Il Museo nazionale della Magna Grecia di Reggio Calabria. Reggio Calabria, Laruffa, 2004. ISBN 88-7221-238-3.
- Elena Lattanzi. Il Museo nazionale di Reggio Calabria. Reggio Calabria, Gangemi, 1987. ISBN 88-7448-184-5.
- Elena Lattanzi. Il Museo Nazionale di Reggio Calabria. Memorie della Magna Grecia. Gangemi, Reggio Calabria. ISBN 88-7448-049-0.
- Maria Gulli. The Riace bronzes and the Museo Nazionale of Reggio Calabria. Catanzaro, 1997.
- Maurizio Harari. A proposito dei Bronzi di Riace. in Athenaeum, 1988.
- Mario Lupano. Marcello Piacentini. Bari, Laterza, 1991, ISBN 88-420-3882-2.
- Paolo Moreno. I bronzi di Riace, il maestro di Olimpia e i sette a Tebe. Milano, Electa, 1998. ISBN 88-435-6307-6.
- Domenico Musti. Magna Grecia. Bari, Editori Laterza, 205. ISBN 88-420-7585-X.
- Augusto Placanica. Storia della Calabria. Reggio Calabria, Gangemi, 2002. ISBN 88-7448-158-6.
- Gisela Marie Augusta Richter. Kouroi, archaic Greek youths, A study of the development of the kouros type in Greek sculpture. London, The Phaidon press, 1960.
- C. Sabbione, R. Spadea. Il Museo di Reggio. 1994.
- M. Taliercio Mensitieri, E. Spagnoli. Ripostigli dalla Piana lametina nel Museo Archeologico Nazionale di Reggio Calabria. Soveria Mannelli, Rubbettino, 2001.
- Alessandra Melucco Vaccaro, Giovanna De Palma. I bronzi di Riace, restauro come conoscenza. Roma, Artemide edizioni, 2003. ISBN 88-86291-73-6.
- Istituto Poligrafico e Zecca dello Stato. Museo nazionale di Reggio Calabria. Reggio Calabria, Parallelo 38, 1975.
- Istituto Poligrafico e Zecca dello Stato. Due bronzi da Riace, rinvenimento, restauro, analisi ed ipotesi di interpretazione. Roma, Istituto Poligrafico e Zecca dello Stato, 1984.
