= Giovanni Balducci (essayist) =

Italian essayist (1988)

- Occupations: essayist, sociologist
- Years active: 2013–present

Giovanni Balducci (1988) is an Italian essayist and sociologist.

== Early life ==
He was born in Apulia and earned a bachelor's degree in law, specializing in Sociology of law, focusing on microsociology and symbolic interactionism for his thesis.

== Career ==
He authored a sociological essay titled La vita quotidiana come gioco di ruolo. Dal concetto di face in Goffman alla labeling theory della scuola di Chicago. This essay is included in the collections of numerous significant libraries in both Italy and abroad, notably at the university libraries of Harvard and Yale, the Bibliothèque nationale de France (BnF), and the Library of Congress in Washington, and has been adopted as a textbook at the Faculty of Political Science of the University of Padua.

His interdisciplinary approach extended to philosophy and literature with a distinct emphasis on political, habitual, and collective imaginary aspects. He composed essays on the philosophy of history, including Sotto la cupola del vero. Breviario della Tradizione, which drew inspiration from the works of René Guénon and the philosophical tradition of perennialism. Additionally, he explored the lives and works of notable figures such as Giuseppe Mazzini, Franz Cumont, Mario Praz, Collin de Plancy, James G. Frazer, and the enigmatic Gilles de Rais. Furthermore, he pursued a career as a translator, rendering works by authors such as Joris Karl Huysmans, Lucian, Henry de Montherlant, Franz Cumont, Collin de Plancy into various languages. These explorations underscore his commitment to examining the sociopolitical and cultural contexts surrounding influential thinkers and events.

In addition to his original works, he has made significant contributions as an editor and translator. He edited the first Italian edition of Napoleon Bonaparte’s early literary writings, shedding light on the formative years of the future emperor. Furthermore, he curated an Italian edition of James G. Frazer’s essay on the ritualistic killing of Khazar kings, bringing this lesser-known anthropological study to an Italian-speaking audience. Another notable editorial achievement includes his curation of Émile Durkheim’s essay La sociologia e il suo dominio scientifico, enriched by a preface from Franco Ferrarotti, the dean of Italian sociology, which contextualizes Durkheim's influence on modern sociological thought.

In the year 2022, he achieved a remarkable scholarly breakthrough in collaboration with his brother Giuseppe, by uncovering and publishing a previously unknown work by Marcel Proust. This work notably references the Impresa di Fiume, an undertaking led by the renowned Italian poet Gabriele D'Annunzio. Their discovery garnered notable attention, with coverage from reputable sources such as Il Sole 24 Ore and TG2.

His contributions to intellectual journals have further solidified his reputation. In 2019, he published an essay titled La dottrina della preesistenza in the historical journal Arthos. His involvement with the international political journal Almanacco Repubblicano includes the essays Nietzsche, Mazzini e l’idea di Europa in 2019 and Un mondo nuovo: sì ma quale? in 2021. These works underscore his ongoing commitment to exploring sociopolitical themes, European intellectual heritage, and contemporary ideological shifts.

== Bibliography ==
(selected works)

=== Essays ===
- La vita quotidiana come gioco di ruolo. Dal concetto di face in Goffman alla labeling theory della scuola di Chicago, Mimesis, 2021, ISBN 9788857580319.
- Sotto la cupola del vero. Breviario della Tradizione, Solfanelli, 2023, ISBN 9788833053455.
- I misteri di Whitechapel. La pista esoterica nei delitti di Jack Lo Squartatore, Augh!, 2025, ISBN 9788893434393.

=== Edited books ===
- D'Annunzio de' Francesi, in Marcel Proust, Soggiorno a Venezia. D'Annunzio nella "Recherche", edited by Giovanni and Giuseppe Balducci, preface by Takashi Inoue, Luni Editrice, 2022, ISBN 9788879848237.
- Henry de Montherlant, Giulio Cesare. Dialogo con un'ombra, edited and translated by Giovanni Balducci, Aragno, 2023, ISBN 9788893802307.
- J.-K Huysmans, Gilles de Rais. La stregoneria nel Poitou, edited and translated by Giovanni Balducci, Aragno, 2023, ISBN 9788893802512.
- Ritratto di Mario Praz, in Mario Praz, Omelette soufflée à l'antiquaire. Elogio degli antiquari, edited by Giovanni and Giuseppe Balducci, Aragno, 2023, ISBN 9788893802314.
- Introduzione, in Franz Cumont, Il Taurobolio, edited and translated by Giovanni Balducci, Aragno, 2023, ISBN 9788893802529.
- Introduzione, in J. Collin de Plancy, Storia dei vampiri e degli spiriti malefici, edited and translated by Giovanni Balducci, Luni Editrice, 2023, ISBN 9788879848534.
- Premessa, in Napoleone Bonaparte, Gli antefatti della gloria. Scritti letterari giovanili, edited and translated by Giovanni Balducci, Luni Editrice, 2023, ISBN 9788879848756.
- Il re sacro e il sacrificio come rinnovamento della natura e della società, in James G. Frazer, Il sacrificio dei re kazari, edited and translated by Giovanni Balducci, Aragno, 2024, ISBN 9788893802826.
- La nascita di una scienza: Durkheim e lo statuto scientifico della sociologia, in Émile Durkheim, La sociologia e il suo dominio scientifico, preface by Franco Ferrarotti, edited and translated by Giovanni Balducci, Mimesis, 2024.
