= Giuseppe Balducci (literary critic) =

Italian literary critic and translator (born 1992)

- Born: 1992 (age 33–34); Apulia, Italy
- Education: University of Bari
- Occupations: Literary critic, translator, editor
- Notable work: Pierre Loti fra esotismo e femminilità
- Website: giuseppebalducci.it

Giuseppe Balducci (born 1992) is an Italian literary critic, translator and editor whose work focuses mainly on comparative literature, modern European literature and the relationship between literature and the visual arts. His scholarship and editorial work have dealt particularly with Mario Praz, Pierre Loti, Frederick Rolfe, Norman Douglas, Henry de Montherlant and Jean Cocteau.

== Biography and research ==
Balducci was born in Apulia in 1992. He studied literature at the University of Bari, where he graduated with a thesis devoted to the emblem-books section of the special Mario Praz collection held by the Fondazione Primoli in Rome. The research was carried out within the university's bibliography and library-science programme.

His early research was consequently centred on Praz's work as a comparatist, bibliographer and scholar of the relations between literature and the visual arts, particularly the tradition of emblem books and imprese. In 2022 Balducci published the essay "La letteratura degli emblemi e delle imprese. Mario Praz e gli 'Studi sul concettismo'", devoted to Praz's Studies in Seventeenth-Century Imagery. He later returned to emblematic literature in articles on the symbolic use of animals and on the relationship between emblems, literature and the visual arts.

Balducci's research subsequently expanded to nineteenth- and twentieth-century French and English-language literature. His work on Pierre Loti has examined exoticism, gender and the representation of cultural otherness. An article on Loti's first novel, Aziyadé, appeared in the academic journal Studi Francesi in 2024; it analysed the novel's representation of Istanbul, its literary sources and the relationship between its principal characters.

In 2025 Rosenberg & Sellier published his monograph Pierre Loti fra esotismo e femminilità, a study of Loti's fiction and of the relationship between exoticism, gender identity and autobiographical representation.

== Editorial and translation work ==
=== Mario Praz ===
A substantial part of Balducci's editorial activity has been devoted to recovering lesser-known writings by Mario Praz.

In 2022 he edited Misteri d'Italia, a collection of writings by Praz published by Nino Aragno Editore. The edition was discussed by critics including Alfonso Berardinelli in Avvenire, Giuseppe Marcenaro in Alias of il manifesto, and Matteo Marchesini in Il Foglio.

He subsequently edited or co-edited Praz's Omelette soufflée à l'antiquaire and Collezionare libri (both 2023). In 2024 he edited Alcibiade. Gli articoli di "Paese Sera" 1960–1972, with a preface by art historian Alvar González-Palacios. The volume collects the articles that Praz published in the literary supplement Libri of the newspaper Paese Sera between November 1960 and February 1972, most of them under the pseudonym "Alcibiade". The collection was later reviewed in Il Messaggero, Alias – il manifesto and the Sunday cultural supplement of Il Sole 24 Ore.

In 2024 Rai Cultura devoted an interview and profile to Balducci's work on Praz and his recovery of the critic's lesser-known writings. In 2025 Balducci published an essay in Treccani's cultural magazine Il Tascabile on Praz's relationship with Rome, examining the contrast between the critic's domestic aesthetic world and his perception of the transformation of the modern city.

In 2026, Balducci edited I clowns del circo Freud. Vasti e strani domìni, a previously published essay by Praz that first appeared in a periodical in 1978. Reviewing the edition in Tuttolibri, the literary supplement of La Stampa, Jacopo Parodi described Balducci as a refined and profound scholar of Praz and, in his assessment, one of Praz's foremost interpreters. Parodi also discussed Balducci's recovery of the essay and his reading of Praz's criticism of modern art.

=== Proust, Loti and other European writers ===
In 2022, together with Giovanni Balducci, he edited Soggiorno a Venezia. D'Annunzio nella "Recherche", a short text by Marcel Proust connected with the Venetian episode of In Search of Lost Time and containing an unusual reference to Gabriele D'Annunzio and the Fiume enterprise. Balducci supplied the notes to the edition, which included a preface by Proust scholar Takashi Inoue. The publication was reported by Italian national media, including Il Sole 24 Ore and TG2.

Balducci's Italian translation of Pierre Loti's Matelot, published as Uomo di mare in 2023, was discussed by Stenio Solinas in il Giornale in March 2024; the review presented the novel as previously unpublished in Italian. Solinas also reviewed Il Bestiario Celeste by Henry de Montherlant, edited by Giovanni and Giuseppe Balducci.

His other editorial projects include works by Henry de Montherlant, Aldo Palazzeschi, Frederick Rolfe, Percy Bysshe Shelley, John Addington Symonds, Aleister Crowley, Norman Douglas and Jean Cocteau.

With Giovanni Balducci he edited and translated a selection of Rolfe's stories originally published in The Yellow Book, issued in 2024 as Di santi, diavoli e… "The Yellow Book" 1895–1896. In Domani, Giovanni Maria Vian praised the Italian translation. The edition was also reviewed in Alias – il manifesto and Il Gazzettino.

In 2025 he edited and translated Norman Douglas's Some Antiquarian Notes, published in Italian as Capri. Annotazioni antiquarie by La nave di Teseo. The book attracted extensive coverage in the Italian press, including reviews and articles in Corriere della Sera, la Repubblica, Il Mattino, Alias – il manifesto and Avvenire. Emanuele Trevi, reviewing the book in La Lettura, described the edition as well edited by Balducci and discussed Douglas's antiquarian approach to Capri. The volume was also discussed by Alessandro Zaccuri in Avvenire and Emanuele Papi in Il Sole 24 Ore.

Balducci also edited and translated John Addington Symonds's essay on the "comrade love" theme in Walt Whitman's Calamus. The Italian edition, Amore cameratesco. L'amicizia virile in "Calamus" di Whitman, was published by Editoriale Scientifica in 2025.

In 2026 he edited and translated Cocteau's novel Thomas l'imposteur as Thomas l'impostore, published by SE with an introductory text by French writer and biographer Claude Arnaud.

== Critical interests and journalism ==
Balducci's scholarly and critical writing is concerned chiefly with comparative literature, modern European literature and the interaction between literary texts, biography and visual culture.

Alongside his academic publications, he contributes essays and criticism to Italian cultural magazines and newspapers. His work has appeared in Studi Francesi, Studium, Divus Thomas, Il Giornale dell'Arte, Il Tascabile, La ricerca, MicroMega, Antinomie, Artribune, Cinematografo, Alias, and Il Foglio.

His articles have addressed subjects including the history of emblem literature, Praz's methods of literary and art-historical research, John Cowper Powys, Hayden White, and Carlo Ginzburg. He has also written an article on the theatre of Rainer Werner Fassbinder and an essay on Fassbinder's cinema.

== Selected bibliography ==
=== Monographs ===
- Pierre Loti fra esotismo e femminilità. Turin: Rosenberg & Sellier, 2025. ISBN 9791259933959.

=== Edited and translated books ===
- Mario Praz, Misteri d'Italia, edited by Giuseppe Balducci. Turin: Aragno, 2022. ISBN 9788893802000.
- Marcel Proust, Soggiorno a Venezia. D'Annunzio nella «Recherche», edited by Giovanni and Giuseppe Balducci; notes by Giuseppe Balducci; preface by Takashi Inoue. Milan: Luni Editrice, 2022. ISBN 9788879848237.
- Pierre Loti, Uomo di mare, edited and translated by Giuseppe Balducci. Turin: Robin Edizioni, 2023. ISBN 9791254672235.
- Henry de Montherlant, Giulio Cesare. Dialogo con un'ombra, edited by Giovanni and Giuseppe Balducci; translated by Giovanni Balducci; afterword by Giuseppe Balducci. Turin: Aragno, 2023. ISBN 9788893802307.
- Aldo Palazzeschi, Usanze d'oggi, edited by Giuseppe Balducci. Turin: Aragno, 2023. ISBN 9788893802642.
- Mario Praz, Omelette soufflée à l'antiquaire. Elogio degli antiquari, edited by Giovanni and Giuseppe Balducci. Turin: Aragno, 2023.
- Mario Praz, Collezionare libri, edited by Giuseppe Balducci. Turin: Aragno, 2023. ISBN 9788893802567.
- Omar Khayyám, Robā’iyyāt. Alla gloria del Vino, edited by Giovanni and Giuseppe Balducci. Milan: Luni Editrice, 2023. ISBN 9788879848633.
- Percy Bysshe Shelley, Alastor. O lo Spirito della Solitudine, edited by Giuseppe Balducci. Turin: Aragno, 2024. ISBN 9788893803182.
- Frederick Rolfe, Di santi, diavoli e… "The Yellow Book" 1895–1896, edited and translated by Giovanni and Giuseppe Balducci. Turin: Aragno, 2024. ISBN 9788893802819.
- Henry de Montherlant, Il Bestiario Celeste, edited by Giovanni and Giuseppe Balducci. Turin: Aragno, 2024.
- Mario Praz, Alcibiade. Gli articoli di "Paese Sera" 1960–1972, edited by Giuseppe Balducci; preface by Alvar González-Palacios. Turin: Aragno, 2024. ISBN 9788893803113.
- Norman Douglas, Capri. Annotazioni antiquarie, edited and translated by Giuseppe Balducci. Milan: La nave di Teseo, 2025. ISBN 9788834621240.
- John Addington Symonds, Amore cameratesco. L'amicizia virile in "Calamus" di Whitman, edited and translated by Giuseppe Balducci. Naples: Editoriale Scientifica, 2025. ISBN 9791223505038.
- Aleister Crowley, Arte in America, edited by Giovanni and Giuseppe Balducci. Turin: Aragno, 2025. ISBN 9788893803540.
- Jean Cocteau, Thomas l'impostore, edited and translated by Giuseppe Balducci; introduction by Claude Arnaud. Milan: SE, 2026. ISBN 9788867239856.
- Mario Praz, I clowns del circo Freud. Vasti e strani domìni, edited by Giuseppe Balducci. Turin: Aragno, 2026. ISBN 9788893804226.

=== Selected scholarly articles ===
- "La letteratura degli emblemi e delle imprese. Mario Praz e gli 'Studi sul concettismo'", La Biblioteca di via Senato, no. 3 (2022), pp. 29–39.
- "Pierre Loti: un romantico «attardé» fra esotismo e femminilità", Illuminazioni, no. 64 (2023), pp. 3–20.
- "Roma di Aldo Palazzeschi: un viaggio nelle contraddizioni della città eterna fra tradizione e modernità", Studium, no. 4 (2023), pp. 681–685.
- "Aziyadé: un romanzo tra sogno e realtà", Studi Francesi, no. 202 (2024), pp. 53–65.
- "Storia di un'amicizia fra 'contrari'. 'La storia di Pomponio e di Cirillo'", La Biblioteca di via Senato, no. 6 (2024), pp. 86–91.
- "La figura del cigno nell'emblematica. 'In hoc cygno vinces'", La Biblioteca di via Senato, no. 1 (2025), pp. 6–15.
- "Il mito di Atteone: simbolismo del cervo tra letteratura, emblemi e iconologia", Divus Thomas, vol. 128, no. 1 (2025), pp. 163–178.
