= Alfredo Balducci =

Italian playwright (1920–2011)

Alfredo Balducci (Livorno 1920 – Milan 2011) was an Italian playwright.

== Life ==
Balducci lived in Milan for most of his adult life. Apart from a few fictional works including novels and short stories, most of Balducci's production has been writing for theatre. He has written numerous ironic-satires and dramas, twenty of which have been presented at the Piccolo Teatro di Milano, Teatro Stabile di Trieste, Teatro Sistina di Roma and many others.

Balducci has received nine awards for his theatrical works; twointernational awards and seven national awards. His international awards consist of the "Pirandello – Brecht project" (New York, April 1997) and the "Onassis – Distinction Prize" (Athens, 2006). His national awards include Riccione, Pirandello (Agrigento), Italian Drama Institute, Anticoli Corrado, Pozzale, and Giuseppe Fava. His most recent award was the Luigi Antonelli Award (Autumn 1998).

Balducci's works have been published in reviews such as "Sipario", "Il Dramma" and "Ridotto" and in the series "Teatro italiano contemporaneo" by the Società Italiana Autori Drammatici.

Many highly acclaimed theatre critics have written about Balducci's works, including Jacobbi, De Monticelli, Possenti, Terron, De Chiara, and Prosperi. A critical monograph was also published by Roberto Rebora which appeared in the "Italian Review of Dramaturgy".

Many of his dramas have been translated into various foreign languages and performed abroad, as well as published by 'Serarcangeli Publisher'.

He has collaborated with Italian State Radio and Television (R.A.I), Yugoslavian Radio, Switzerland Television, Telemontecarlo, and with Greek Radio.
