= Álvar González-Palacios =

Alvar González-Palacios
- Born: 13 May 1936 (age 90); Santiago de Cuba, Cuba
- Occupations: Art historian, essayist
- Known for: Studies of decorative arts, furniture and European court art

Alvar González-Palacios (born 13 May 1936) is a Cuban-born Italian art historian, essayist and specialist in the decorative arts. His scholarship has focused particularly on Italian and European court art from the Renaissance to Neoclassicism, including furniture, goldsmithing, bronzes, mosaics and pietra dura. He has published extensively on the decorative arts of Rome, Naples and Florence, the collections of the Quirinal Palace, and the Roman family of goldsmiths and bronze workers known as the Valadier.

== Early life and education ==
González-Palacios was born in Santiago de Cuba on 13 May 1936. He was educated in Cuba, Canada, France and Italy. He studied at the University of Havana and the Sorbonne, and after settling permanently in Italy in 1957 continued his studies in Florence, where he attended the courses of art historian Roberto Longhi.

González-Palacios later recalled that his encounter with Longhi changed his original intention of pursuing literary studies and led him towards art history. Initially interested in Italian painting of the fourteenth and fifteenth centuries and in painting between the Baroque and Classicism, he gradually turned his attention to the decorative arts and the history of furniture.

During his formative years, he was also associated with projects connected with Longhi's school of art history. Between 1961 and 1963 he collaborated with other scholars on the translation and updating of Joseph Archer Crowe and Giovanni Battista Cavalcaselle's A History of Painting in North Italy, in a project supervised by Enrico Castelnuovo and Mina Gregori.

After Florence, González-Palacios lived for a period in Milan before settling in Rome in 1971. He also spent extended periods in Paris and London. Born a Cuban citizen, he later became a naturalized Italian citizen.

== Art-historical scholarship ==
=== Decorative arts ===
González-Palacios has specialized in the history of European decorative arts, a field that received comparatively less attention than painting and sculpture in twentieth-century Italian art historiography. His research has encompassed furniture, bronzes, gold and silverware, porcelain, mosaics, pietra dura and interior decoration, considered within the broader context of European visual culture and court life.

His early publications on furniture and the decorative arts included Il Luigi XIV (1966). His major synthesis Il tempio del gusto, published in two volumes in 1984 and 1986, examined the development of the decorative arts in Italy between Classicism and the Baroque. It was followed by Il gusto dei principi (1993), devoted to court art of the seventeenth and eighteenth centuries.

Another significant area of his scholarship has been the collections of the Quirinal Palace, the official residence of the President of Italy. González-Palacios catalogued and studied its French furnishings as well as its Italian furniture, the latter project undertaken with Roberto Valeriani.

He also studied the Spanish royal collections of mosaics and hardstone works. His research was published by the Museo del Prado in 2001 as Las colecciones reales españolas de mosaicos y piedras duras and later appeared in Italian as Pittura per l'eternità. Le collezioni reali spagnole di mosaici e pietre dure.

In 2013 the Vatican Museums published his Il serraglio di pietra. La Sala degli Animali in Vaticano, a study of the history and formation of the Animal Room (Sala degli Animali) in the Museo Pio-Clementino. Based on archival research, the work catalogued the sculptures in the room and reconstructed the activity of the artists and restorers involved in its creation, including Francesco Antonio Franzoni.

=== The Valadier ===
A major and longstanding area of González-Palacios's scholarship has been the Valadier family of Roman goldsmiths, silversmiths and bronze workers, and particularly Luigi Valadier, one of the leading decorative artists of eighteenth-century Rome.

His research contributed to several international exhibitions, including exhibitions at the Louvre, the exhibition L'oro di Valadier at the French Academy in Rome, and Luigi Valadier: Splendor in Eighteenth-Century Rome at the Frick Collection in New York in 2018–2019. The Frick Collection has described González-Palacios as a leading specialist on Valadier. Its exhibition brought together more than sixty works and was accompanied by an extensive monograph by González-Palacios.

His research on the family was subsequently brought together in the volume I Valadier. Andrea, Luigi, Giuseppe (2019).

=== Roman furniture ===
In his later scholarship González-Palacios undertook a systematic history of Roman furniture. Il mobile a Roma. Dal Rinascimento al Barocco appeared in 2022, followed in 2025 by Il mobile a Roma. Il Settecento. The latter, based on extensive archival and bibliographical research, traces Roman furniture from the Rococo to the Neoclassical period and contains more than five hundred illustrations.

== Exhibitions and editorial work ==
Alongside his research, González-Palacios has contributed to major exhibitions devoted to Italian art and decorative culture of the seventeenth and eighteenth centuries. These have included Gli ultimi Medici. Il tardo Barocco a Firenze, 1670–1743, held at the Detroit Institute of Arts and Palazzo Pitti in Florence in 1974, and Civiltà del '700 a Napoli, held in Naples and Caserta in 1979–1980.

From 1968 to 1974 he directed the art periodical Arte illustrata. From 1976 to 2009 he directed Antologia di Belle Arti, for several years in association with Italian art historian Federico Zeri.

He also directed an encyclopedia of the decorative arts and compiled a catalogue of mosaics and hardstone works in the Los Angeles County Museum of Art.

In 2017 he was elected an Accademico Cultore of the Accademia Nazionale di San Luca in Rome.

== Essays and memoirs ==
In addition to his specialist scholarship, González-Palacios has written essays, memoirs and literary portraits. In 1999 he published Le tre età, an autobiographical work in which his personal history is interwoven with the artistic and cultural milieu of twentieth-century Europe.

His later autobiographical and essayistic books include Un anno di meno (2007), Persona e maschera (2014), Solo ombre (2017), Semillas secas (2018), and Forse è tutta questione di luce (2022).

Written in Spanish, Semillas secas. Infancia y juventud en Cuba 1936–1957 recounts his childhood and youth in Cuba before his permanent move to Europe.

In Persona e maschera and Forse è tutta questione di luce, González-Palacios collected portraits and recollections of art historians, collectors, antiquarians, writers and other cultural figures he encountered, among them Bernard Berenson, Roberto Longhi, Federico Zeri, J. Paul Getty, Anna Banti, Mario Praz, Peggy Guggenheim, Anthony Blunt, Alberto Arbasino and Jorge Luis Borges.

In 2026 he published Opinioni e indulgenze. Pagine d'arte, di luoghi e di affetti, a collection of writings combining art criticism and art history with recollections of people and places.

González-Palacios has also worked as a cultural journalist and critic, contributing to Italian newspapers including Il Giornale, Il Sole 24 Ore and il manifesto.

== Honours and recognition ==
González-Palacios was awarded the French Legion of Honour. He was also appointed a Commander of Spain's Order of Isabella the Catholic. The Spanish decoration was formally presented to him in Rome by Spanish ambassador Alfonso Dastis in February 2019.

His L'armadio delle meraviglie received the Premio Letterario Elba in 1998.

In 2017 he became an Accademico Cultore of the Accademia Nazionale di San Luca.

== Selected works ==
=== Art history and decorative arts ===
- Il Luigi XIV. Milan: Fabbri Editori, 1966.
- Il tempio del gusto. Le arti decorative in Italia fra classicismi e barocco. 2 vols. Milan: Longanesi, 1984–1986; new edition, Vicenza: Neri Pozza, 2000.
- Il velo delle grazie. Turin: Umberto Allemandi & C., 1992.
- Il gusto dei principi. Arte di corte del XVII e del XVIII secolo. Milan: Longanesi, 1993.
- Gli arredi francesi. Il patrimonio artistico del Quirinale. Milan: BNL-Electa, 1995–1996.
- I mobili italiani. Il patrimonio artistico del Quirinale. Milan: BNL-Electa, 1996.
- Il mobile in Liguria. Genoa: Sagep, 1996.
- Las colecciones reales españolas de mosaicos y piedras duras. Madrid: Museo Nacional del Prado, 2001.
- Pittura per l'eternità. Le collezioni reali spagnole di mosaici e pietre dure. Milan: Longanesi, 2003.
- Arredi e ornamenti alla corte di Roma 1560–1795. Milan: Electa, 2004.
- Nostalgia e invenzione. Arredi e arti decorative a Roma e Napoli nel Settecento. Milan: Skira, 2010.
- Il serraglio di pietra. La Sala degli Animali in Vaticano. Vatican City: Edizioni Musei Vaticani, 2013.
- Luigi Valadier. New York: The Frick Collection, 2018.
- I Valadier. Andrea, Luigi, Giuseppe. Milan: Officina Libraria, 2019.
- Il mobile a Roma. Dal Rinascimento al Barocco. Rome: Ugo Bozzi Editore, 2022.
- Il mobile a Roma. Il Settecento. Rome: Ugo Bozzi Editore, 2025.

=== Essays and memoirs ===
- La cultura dell'ignoranza. Turin: Umberto Allemandi & C., 1983.
- L'armadio delle meraviglie. Personaggi, vicende, oggetti: un invito all'arte, una lezione di stile. Milan: Longanesi, 1997.
- Le tre età. Milan: Longanesi, 1999.
- Un anno di meno. Diario del 2006. Case, musei, incontri, viaggi. Milan: Skira, 2007.
- Persona e maschera. Collezionisti, antiquari, storici dell'arte. Milan: Archinto, 2014.
- Solo ombre. Silhouettes storiche, letterarie e mondane. Milan: Archinto, 2017.
- Semillas secas. Infancia y juventud en Cuba 1936–1957. Madrid: Editorial Verbum, 2018.
- Forse è tutta questione di luce. Ritratti e incontri. Milan: Salani, 2022.
- Opinioni e indulgenze. Pagine d'arte, di luoghi e di affetti. Milan: Salani, 2026.
