= Messina Courthouse =

Building in Messina, Italy

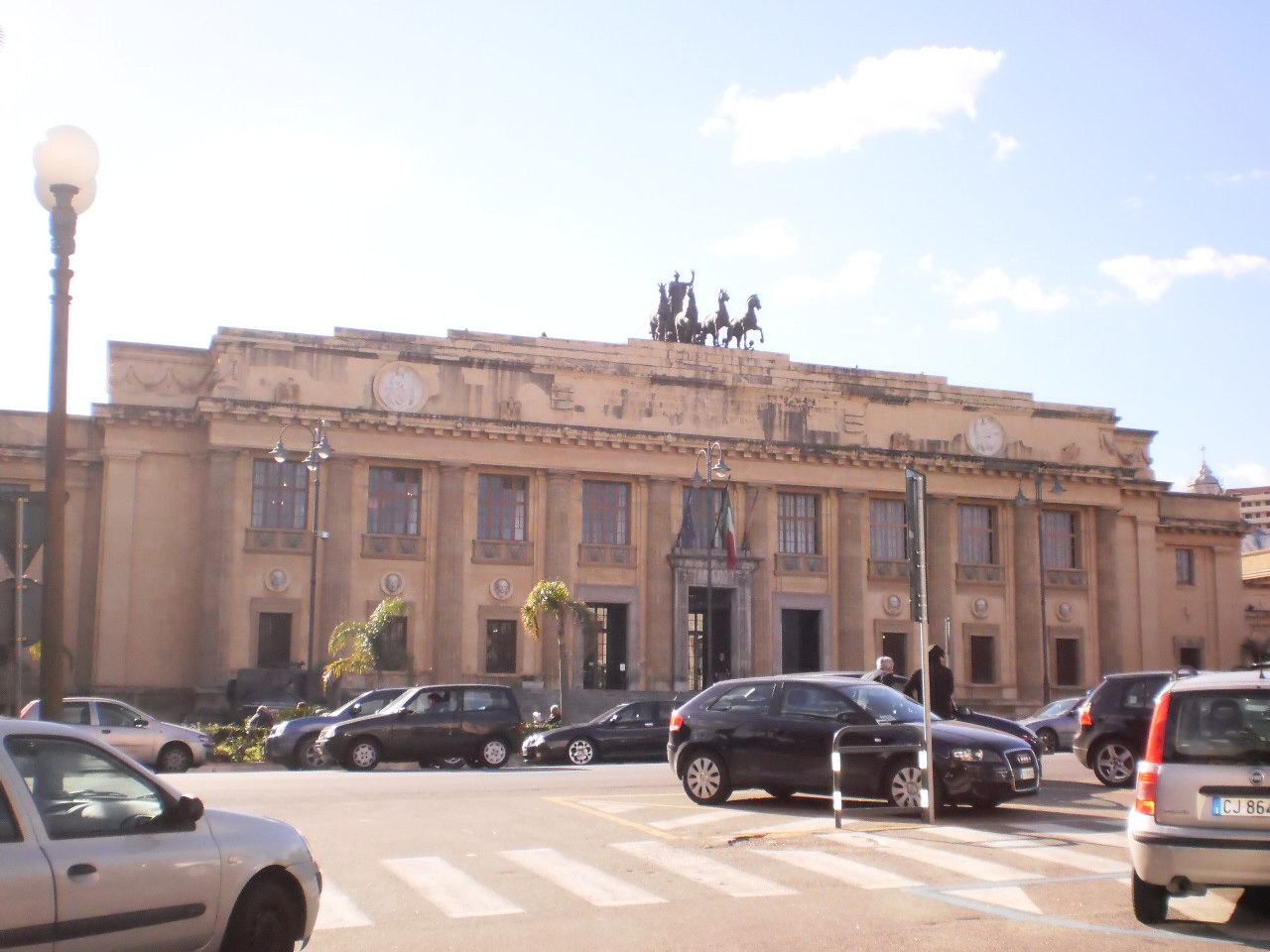
- Interactive map of the Messina Courthouse area

General information
- Location: Messina, Sicily, Italy
- Coordinates: 38°11′18.3″N 15°33′08.5″E
- Construction started: 1913
- Completed: 1927
- Inaugurated: 28 October 1928; 97 years ago

Design and construction
- Architect: Marcello Piacentini

The Messina Courthouse (Palazzo di Giustizia, or Palazzo del Tribunale) is a judicial building located on Via Tommaso Cannizzaro in Messina, Italy.

== History ==
The courthouse in Messina was built on the site of the former hospital, which was destroyed in the 1908 earthquake.

Approved in 1912, the project was designed by Marcello Piacentini. Construction was initially assigned to the Porcheddu company, but was suspended with the outbreak of World War I.

Work resumed in 1923, entrusted to Carmelo Salvato & Figli. Piacentini revised the design: while the structural layout remained the same, the architectural style shifted from Renaissance Revival to a reinterpretation of German Neoclassicism, adopting the Doric order inspired by the Brandenburg Gate and Sicilian Doric temples.

The building was completed in 1927 and officially inaugurated in 1928.

== Description ==
The palace features a Neoclassical style. Atop the building stands a large quadriga driven by the goddess Minerva, sculpted by Ercole Drei in a bronze and aluminum alloy. Inside, a monumental marble staircase leads to the Court of Assizes.

== Sources ==
- Il Palazzo di Giustizia di Messina dell'architetto Marcello Piacentini. Milan–Rome: Bestetti e Tumminelli. 1929.
- Neri, Maria Luisa; Catini, Raffaella; Cervellini, Francesco (2015). L'altra modernità nella cultura architettonica del XX secolo. Rome: Gangemi.
