= Ophelia Project =

Psychiatric hospital in Potenza, Italy

Geography
- Location: Potenza, Basilicata, Italy

Organisation
- Type: Specialist

Services
- Speciality: Psychiatric Hospital

History
- Opened: 1910s

Links
- Lists: Hospitals in Italy

The Ophelia Project by Giuseppe Quaroni and Marcello Piacentini refers to an innovative mental health hospital built in Potenza, Basilicata (Italy), in the 1910s. It was built in an area, Santa Maria, whose development over time has been greatly conditioned by this project. Nowadays this area is mainly made up of three or four-storey buildings with wide streets in between.

== History ==
The decision to build a new provincial institution for mental health in Potenza dates back to the early twentieth century. The Provincial Deputation of Basilicata wanted to reduce the expenses paid by municipalities to send the mentally ill to Aversa Psychiatric Hospital, which was in another region. The Province of Potenza spent between 80,000 and 100,000 lire a year for the treatment of the mentally ill in the Royal psychiatric hospitals. By spending just a little more than that, the Province would have built a mental institution and would have taken care of local patients. Moreover, there was a "humane" reason behind this idea: patients' rehabilitation had proved to be very problematic in large mental health institutions, where the care was usually poor due to the high number of patients. In a local smaller mental hospital, the odds that the ill would get better were higher.

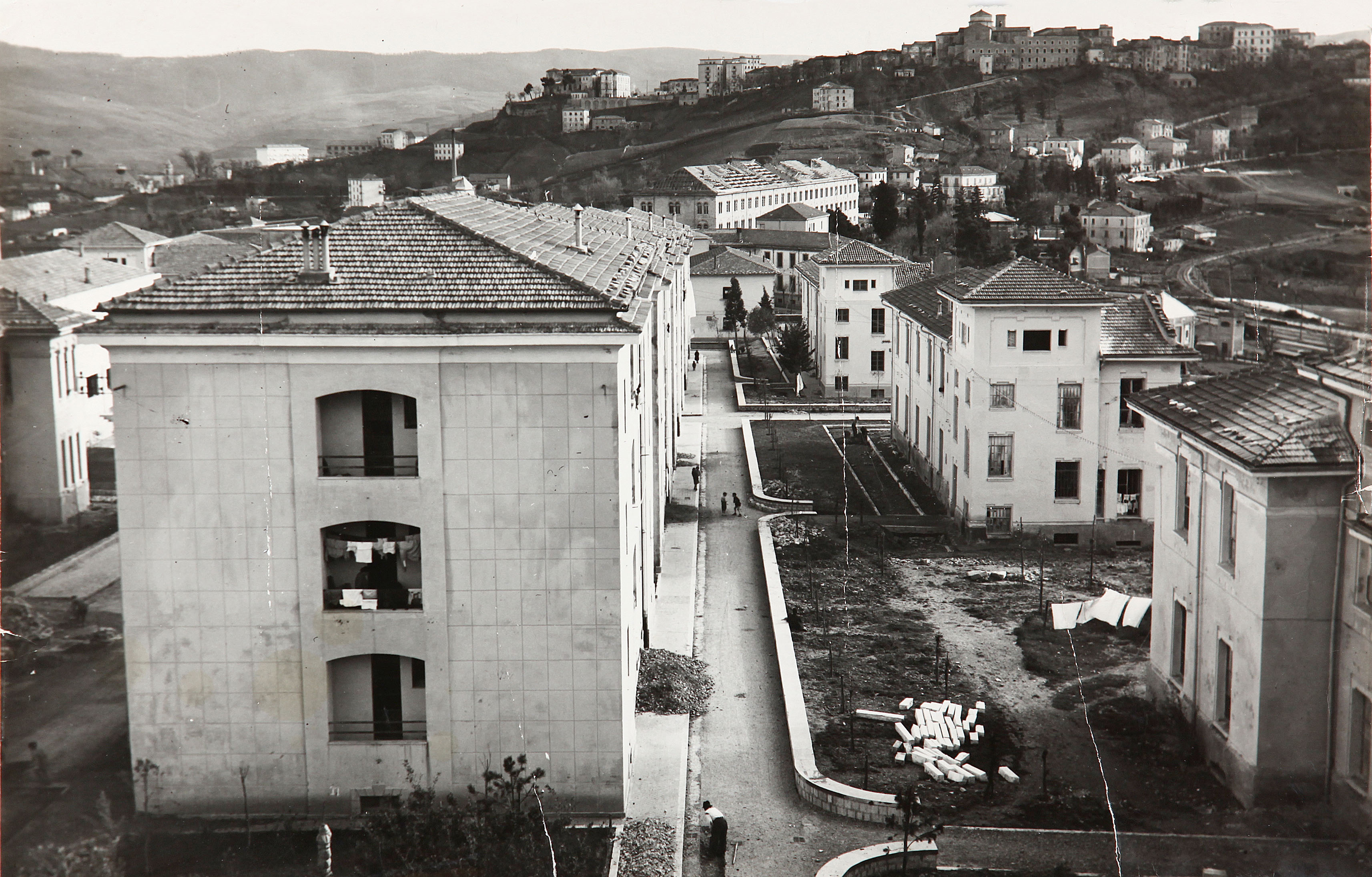
Pavilions of the mental hospital on the right

In 1905 a competition was announced. The prize of 600 lire was given to Giuseppe Quaroni and Marcello Piacentini for the Ophelia project. Quaroni, an engineer, and Piacentini, an architect, were both from Rome and they named their project after the Hamlet character, Ophelia, who goes mad and drowns herself in Shakespeare's tragedy ("O heat, dry up my brains! Tears seven times salt burn out the sense and virtue of mine eye. By heaven, thy madness shall be paid with weight…" in act IV, scene V). The estimated outlay for the project was of 1,100,000 lire that had to be spent to build the main wards within five years. In 1907 the foundation stone was laid, but the works only began in 1910. Unfortunately, due to the high costs, the outbreak of World War I and also the alteration of the initial plan to stand up to the expenses, the Provincial Council decided not to earmark the buildings for the mental institution anymore. Until 1920, they thought of converting the complex into a Military Hospital. Meanwhile, the buildings were used as warehouses for crops or for any other necessity. The final decision was to convert some wards into private residences; others became the premises of a primary school, of a post office and a museum.

== The originality of the Ophelia Project ==
The Ophelia Project by Quaroni and Piacentini was impressively original. Never before had anyone designed a mental hospital like this in Southern Italy.

In the introduction to their project, the two designers explained that a mental hospital had to satisfy two requirements: it should be like an ordinary hospital, since it is a treatment centre where sick people are hospitalized; but, at the same time, it should also be like a prison, since all the patients have to be well guarded in order to prevent escapes and suicides.

Quaroni and Piacentini made another point: what if patients became aware of their "captive state"? In order to avoid that, they looked for a solution that could make their stay a little more pleasant, especially in the moments of higher consciousness; so they opted for the separation of the different types of patients in different pavilions, each of them surrounded by blooming gardens and boulevards that would provide the healing power of nature.

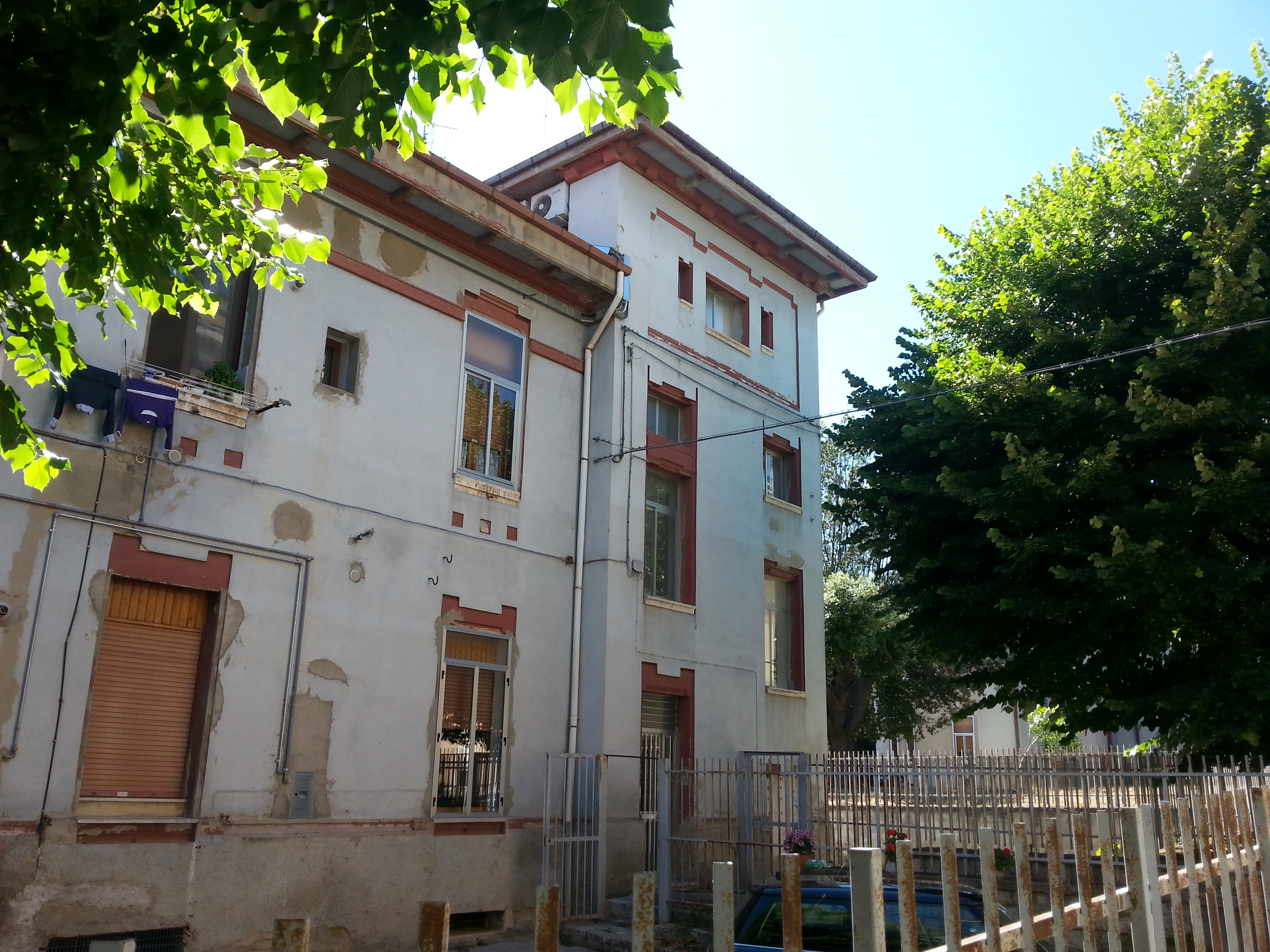
Quiet female patients' pavilion

Following an in-depth study on mental illness, Quaroni and Piacentini designed blocks for the following profiles of mentally ill patients: tranquilli (quiet) – semiagitati (semi-violent) – agitati e furiosi (violent and furious) – sudici ed epilettici (filthy and epilectic)– paralitici ed infermi (paralytic and infirm)– fanciulli e idioti (children and idiots) – contagiosi (infectious) – dementi criminali (insane criminals).

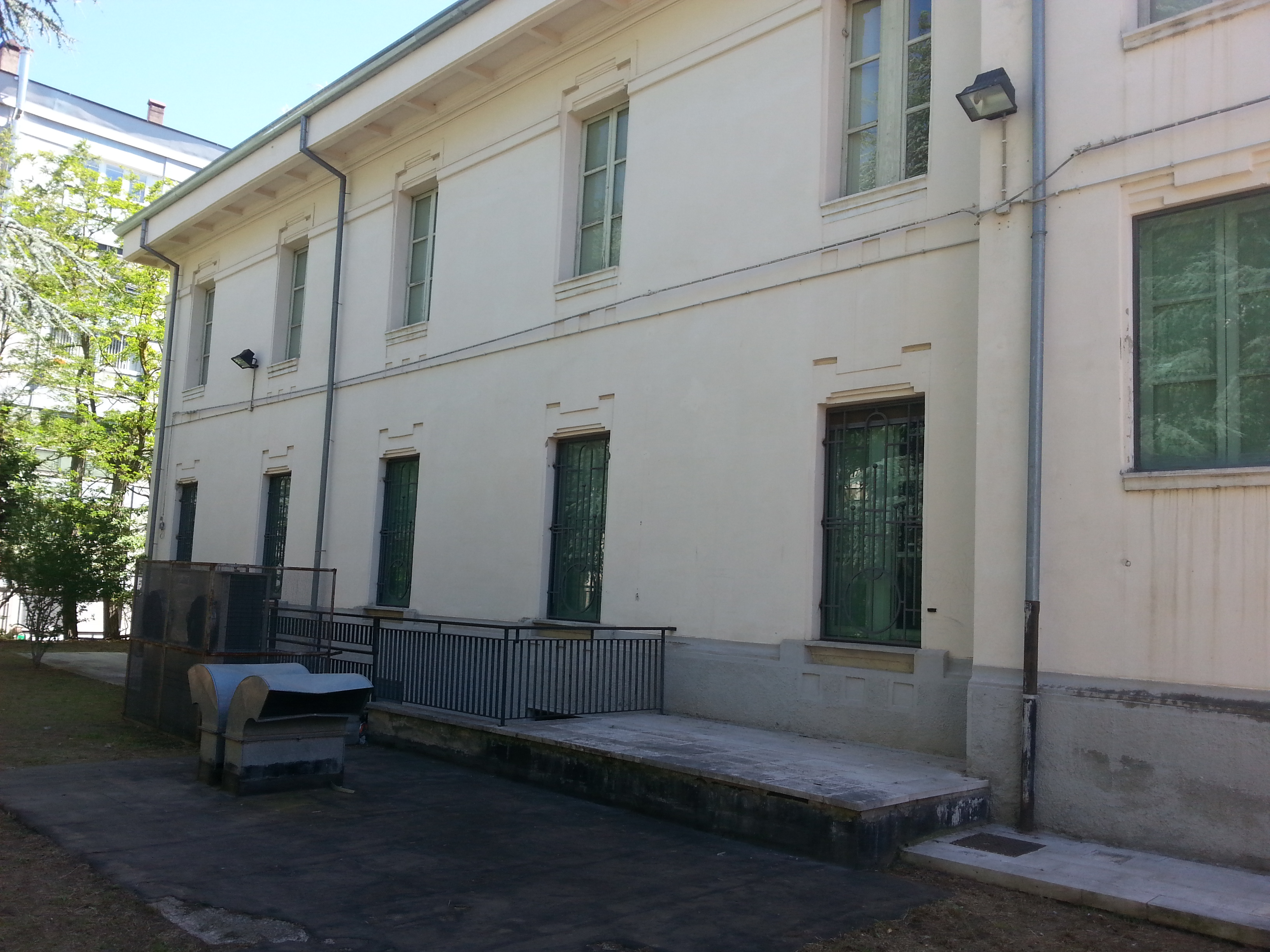
Semi-violent female patients' pavilion

Even the place where these patients had to stay was not the result of a random choice. For example, quiet and semi-violent patients were placed in the buildings closer to the station or to the Colonia agricola (farming colony) where they could work the land or do manual labour, thus promoting their rehabilitation process.

Another important issue was the positioning of the lavatories. In the past the outhouse was one of the "favourite" suicide spots, since it used to be far from all the places regularly frequented by nurses. Quaroni and Piacentini wanted to place them against some buildings so that patients could be well monitored by nurses and other assistants; but, of course, big windows and openings were needed to ensure adequate ventilation. In addition, to improve the ventilation of the whole complex, the two designers decided to raise the ground level to 760 metres in height.

The psychiatric hospital was organized in accordance with two principal axes: the cross one, from east to west, named asse dei vari reparti (the ward axis), and the long one, from north to south, named asse dei servizi (the service axis). The entire complex was symmetrical to the service axis, where there were the common service buildings, while on the transverse axis there were to be the wards. There were two entrances: the main entrance was set at the intersection between the service axis and the Provincial road and the secondary one, also called service entrance, was positioned at the crossing between the facility axis and the street leading to the station. Each part was connected with the others by a tunnel which was used to provide every building by means of a Decauville railway (which started from the kitchen building).

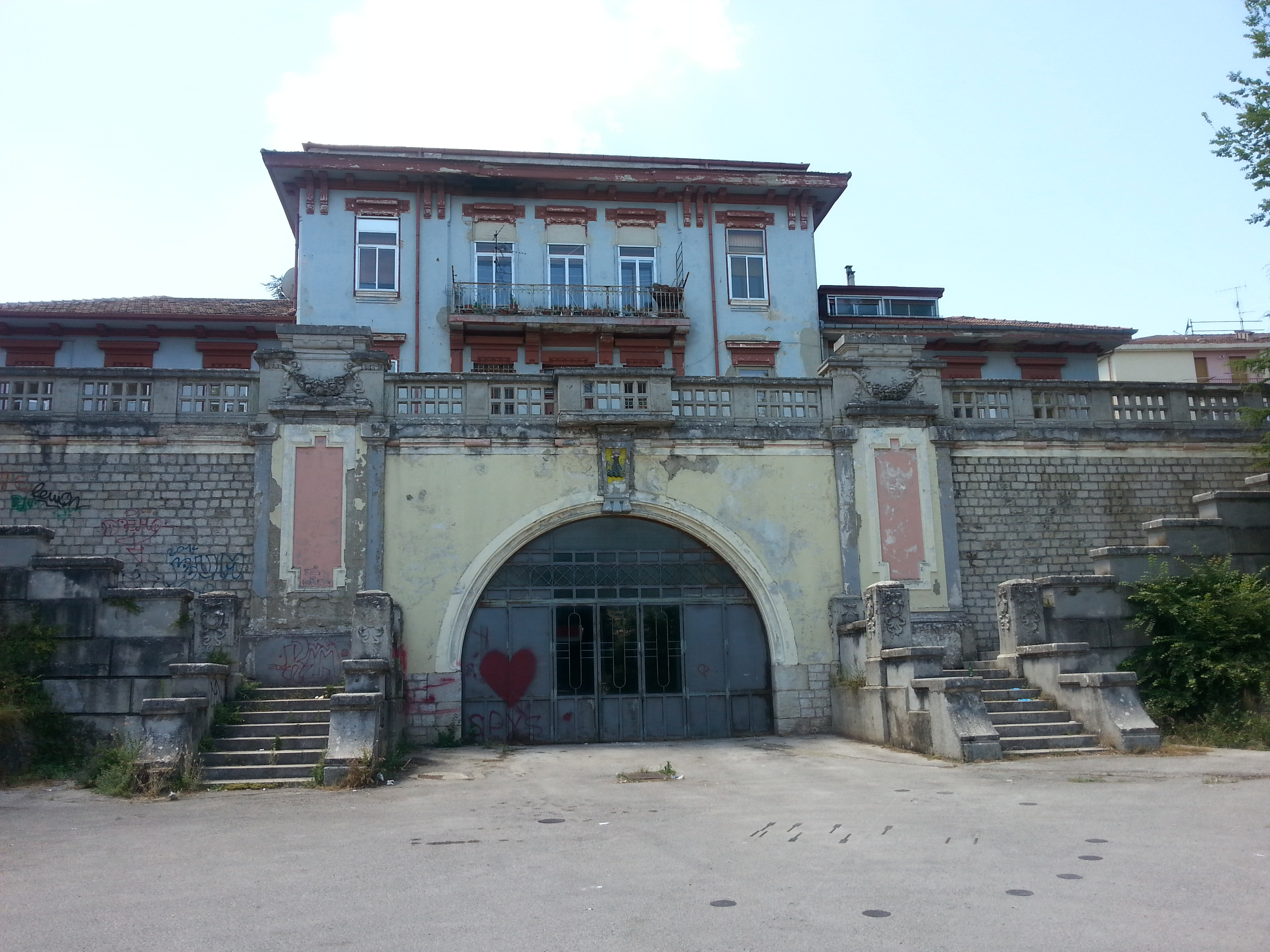
The Administration building and the access to the tunnel

The principal entrance was characterized by a vehicle ramp and two separate flights of steps at the sides of the tunnel, which allowed to get to the upper square. Here there was the Amministrazione (the Administration building), which included the administrative and medical management of the wards, and men's and women's visitors' rooms. Moreover, the square was delimited by the Accettazione Donne (female admission, east) and Accettazione Uomini (male admission, west) pavilions.

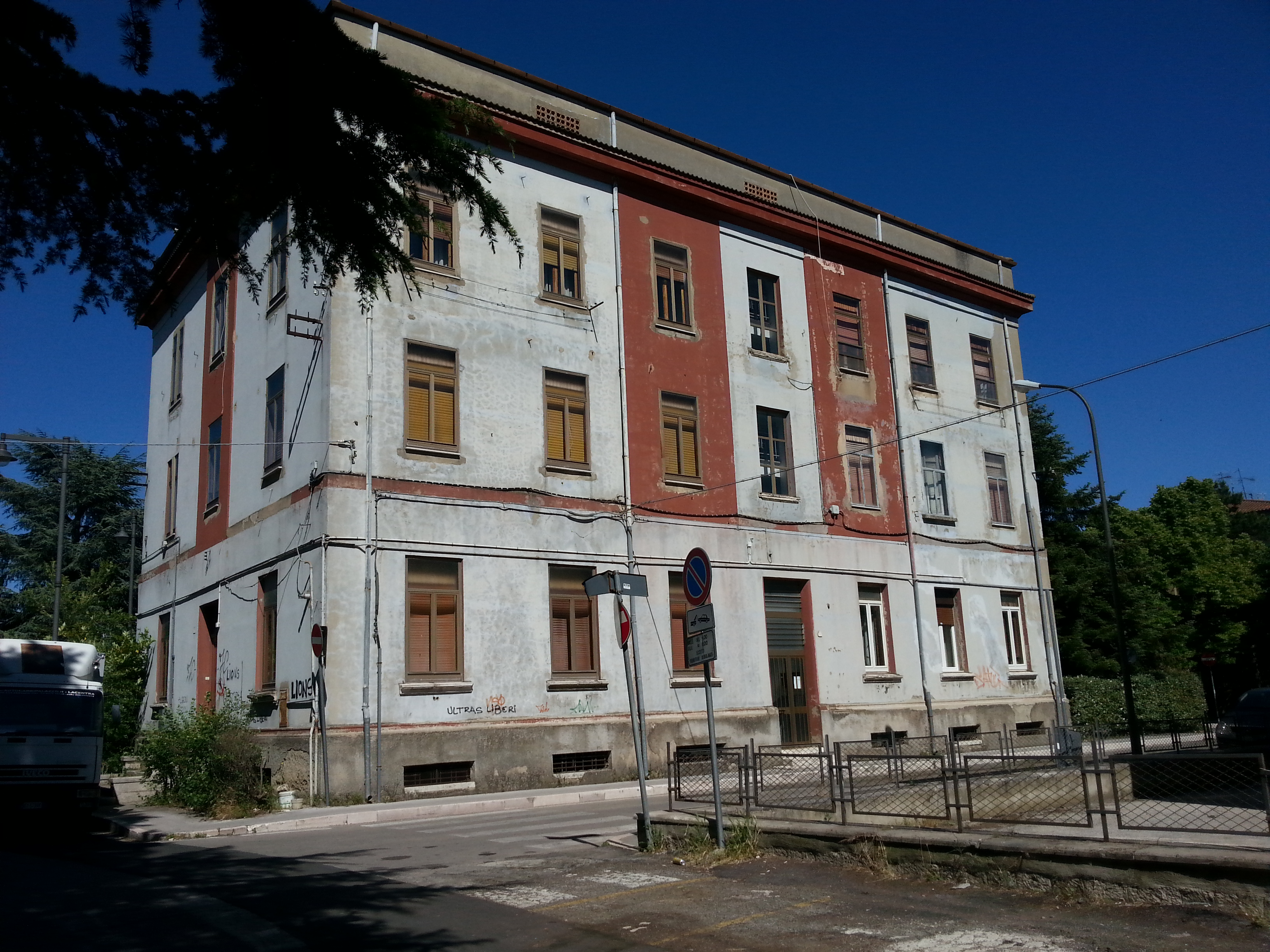
The kitchen building

Behind the Administration building there was the Cucina (the kitchen building) which contained large warehouses directly supplied through the tunnel, and the rooms where the personnel were to have meals. Separated by a large courtyard, there was the Cappella Sacra (the chapel) and on its sides the drugstore and the chaplain's home. They were in front of the Lavanderia (the steam laundry pavilion) and the Guardaroba (the linen storage building).

Every building which was supposed to host patients had two floors: on the ground floor there was the pantry, the kitchen, the dining hall, the doctor's office, a room for male nurses, bathrooms and toilets, while upstairs there were the dormitories, female nurses' rooms and a little room with linen cupboards. Pavilions could have extra space according to the type of mental illness. More distant from the whole complex, there was the Colonia Agricola (farming colony), the Sezione contagiosi (contagious building) with a mortuary, and the Fabbricato della disinfestazione (disinfection building) in two different areas. The farming colony was composed of a cowshed, a barn and a depot and was near the access to the Provincial railway. The farmer's and the undertaker's homes were next to the service entrance.

== Conclusion ==
The Ophelia Project consisted of 18 pavilions and other minor buildings. Today there are only 8 buildings that are still used as private housing: the administration pavilion, the reception for women, the reception for men, the quiet female patients' pavilion, the women's infirmary, the kitchen, the linen storage building and the farming colony. They are all private residences, totalling 37 flats.

== Bibliography ==
- Marcello Piacentini, Manicomio di Potenza, in "Architettura Italiana", a. II, dicembre 1906, n. 3, pp. 9–11, tav. 11.
- Marcello Piacentini, Il progetto premiato pel manicomio di Potenza, in "Bollettino della Società degli Ingegneri e degli Architetti Italiani", a. XIV, nn. 37–38, 23 settembre 1906.
- Marcello Piacentini, Relazione di progetto di Manicomio provinciale a Potenza. Motto "Ophelia", Palombi, Roma 1906.
- Marcello Piacentini - Giuseppe Quaroni, Relazione supplettiva sul progetto di manicomio provinciale in Potenza, distinto col motto Ophelia e prescelto dalla commissione giudicatrice del concorso, riguardante una proposta tecnico-economica per la sua costruzione. Roma, Tip. Fratelli Pallotta, 1906.
- Marcello Piacentini - Giuseppe Quaroni, Ancora sull'architettura manicomiale, in "Bollettino della Società degli ingegneri e degli architetti italiani", XIV, 25 novembre 1906, pp. 700–703.
- Valerio Giambersio, Guida all'architettura del Novecento a Potenza. Melfi, Libria, 1995, pp. 42–45.
- Giuseppe Caporale, G. Quaroni, M. Piacentini: concorso per la costruzione del Manicomio Provinciale di Potenza – Le ragioni del concorso, il Progetto Ophelia, la mancata realizzazione. Potenza, Il Salice, 1997.
- Dal progetto Ophelia alla Pinacoteca Provinciale, ed. by Angela Costabile and Carmela Petrizzi. Potenza, 2000.
- Antonio Bixio, Il progetto Ophelia a Potenza: disegno e rilievo tra ricerca e didattica, in Io non cerco, trovo. Disegno/Progetto nel rapporto tra Ricerca e Didattica, Atti del XXIX Convegno Internazionale UID dei Docenti della Rappresentazione nelle facoltà di Architettura e di Ingegneria (Lerici, 4-6 ottobre 2007), Genova, 2007, pp. 14–19.
- Carla De Fino, Il recupero sostenibile dell’edilizia dei primi decenni del Ventesimo secolo mediante materiali e tecniche innovative, Potenza, Consiglio Regionale della Basilicata, 2008, pp. 251–339.
- Antonio Bixio - Enza Tolla - Giuseppe Damone, Il modello virtuale per il progetto: lo studio del Progetto Ophelia. In: La Experiencia del Reuso, vol. 1. Madrid, 2013, pp. 345–352.
- Concetto Valente's photo archive.
- Il Lucano.
