= SE (publisher) =

Italian publishing house

SE Studio Editoriale SRL
- Status: Active
- Founded: 1985
- Country of origin: Italy
- Headquarters location: Milan
- Distribution: Italy
- Publication types: Books
- Official website: "SE". Facebook.

SE is a publishing house based in Milan, Italy. In addition to publishing new translations (primarily of 20th century classics), it is dedicated to reissuing out-of-print works, providing them with renewed and carefully curated editorial presentations.

== History ==
SE was founded in 1985 by a group of professionals who had long been active in the publishing industry, particularly within the publishing house Guanda. The series Saggi e documenti del Novecento notably adopts the graphic design of Prosa Contemporanea, a series originally published by Guanda. The founding vision of SE was to reintroduce texts deemed highly significant within the international literary and essayistic landscape, yet largely neglected by mainstream publishing. SE focuses on authors of substantial intellectual stature – philosophers, writers, and poets – with a particular emphasis on existential, metaphysical, aesthetic, and political themes.

In 1991, SE gave rise to ES, an independent entity whose catalogue is primarily devoted to erotic literature. In 1999, the publisher Abscondita was established, with the aim of promoting art-related non-fiction. Abscondita's catalogue is organized into several series, including Carte d'artisti, dedicated to writings, memoirs, and letters by artists; Miniature, focused on short texts; and Aesthetica, which features art criticism and theory by authors such as Aby Warburg, Roberto Longhi, Erwin Panofsky, and Bernard Berenson. In 2019, Abscondita was acquired by Electa.

SE is particularly distinguished by its meticulous attention to editorial materials and book production. Its volumes are characterized by a sober, elegant, and immediately recognizable design.

== Works in translation ==
SE's translated publications include works by Guillaume Apollinaire, Georges Bataille, Thomas Bernhard, Gilles Deleuze, Pierre Drieu La Rochelle, Kahlil Gibran, André Gide, Jaroslav Hašek, Christopher Isherwood, Karl Jaspers, Wassily Kandinsky, Yasunari Kawabata, Pierre Klossowski, Gustav Mahler, Stéphane Mallarmé, Yukio Mishima, Rainer Maria Rilke, Alain Robbe-Grillet, Donatien Alphonse François de Sade, Arthur Schnitzler, Rabindranath Tagore, Lev Tolstoj, Paul Valéry, Kurt Vonnegut, Evelyn Waugh, Edmund Wilson, and Louis Wolfson.
