= Marcello Piacentini =

Italian urban theorist (1881–1960)

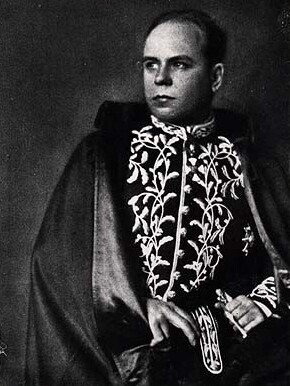
- Marcello Piacentini portrayed with the uniform of a member of the Royal Academy of Italy
- Born: 8 December 1881; Rome, Kingdom of Italy
- Died: 19 May 1960 (aged 78); Rome, Italy
- Occupation: Architect
- Movement: Rationalism
- Spouse: Matilde Festa (m. 1914)
- Parent(s): Pio Piacentini and Teresa Piacentini (née Stefani)
- Buildings: Matarazzo Building; Palácio dos Bandeirantes; Teatro Sistina; Torrione INA; Milan Courthouse; Generali Building; Museo Nazionale della Magna Grecia; Bolzano Victory Monument; PalaLottomatica
- Projects: EUR, Rome; Ophelia Project

Marcello Piacentini (8 December 1881 – 19 May 1960) was an Italian urban theorist and one of the main proponents of Italian Fascist architecture.

== Biography ==
=== Early career ===
Born in Rome, he was the son of architect Pio Piacentini. He studied architecture at the Regio Istituto di Belle Arti, Rome, from 1901 to 1904 and completed his training with his father, with whom he produced a competition entry design (1903) for the National Central Library, Florence. In 1906 he became a teacher of architectural drawing at the Accademia di Belle Arti in Rome, and in 1912 he was a civil architect at the Scuola di Applicazione degli Ingegneri, also in Rome.

Within the prevalent eclecticism of the Roman architectural profession he sought to define his position by designing small-scale, picturesque ensembles that were inspired by Italian vernacular architecture. In this context his competition entries with the engineer Giuseppe Quaroni for the Asylum (1906), Potenza, and a city-centre plan (1906–8) for Bergamo are particularly interesting. The latter plan, which was modified during execution (1911–27), provided the opportunity to experiment with ideas of decentralization and building in relationship to the historic environment, and these experiments subsequently formed the basis of Piacentini's treatise Sulla conservazione della bellezza di Roma e sullo sviluppo della città moderna.

He also worked on a remarkable series of residential buildings in Rome, including small residential blocks conceived as examples of picturesque urban ensembles, such as the Pateras Building (1910–24) in Via Giulia, and some dignified individual houses, for example in Via Germanico (1918–21) and in Via Flaminia (1918–24). These were paralleled in a number of exhibition pavilions, notably that for the Panama–Pacific International Exposition of 1915, in San Francisco, where he designed an ensemble of buildings and public spaces for an imaginary small Italian town, reflecting the aesthetically motivated urban planning of Camillo Sitte.

In 1912 Piacentini was made project manager of all Italian building works in Cyrenaica, in Eastern Libya. The style of his buildings is characteristic of the Neo-Moorish period of Italian colonial architecture in Libya in the 1910s, which can be seen in Benghazi Municipal Hall. He later moved toward a more modern expression of Italian colonial architecture, evident in his Albergo Italia as well as the Berenice Theatre in Benghazi.

Piacentini's work around this time appears to lack a coherent, unified approach. This eclecticism was modified, however, as a result of his travels in the United States (1915) and in Europe (1919), which reinforced his awareness of architectural trends outside Italy and later formed the basis of his article 'Il momento architettonico all'estero'.

His assimilation of non-Italian influences was evident particularly in his design for the Corso Cinema (1915–18), Piazza San Lorenzo in Lucina, Rome. With its reinforced-concrete construction, schematic allusions to the surrounding historic architecture and frank reflection of the secessionist idiom, this building was held to be a deliberately provocative example of Modernism by the conservative-minded architectural establishment of Rome. In the period after World War I Piacentini concentrated on urban planning. His early ideas on the preservation of historic city centres followed those of Sitte and Gustavo Giovannoni in emphasizing conservation and the qualities of neighbourhoods assembled from variegated architecture accumulated over the centuries, and in 1921, with Giovannoni, he founded the journal Architettura e arti decorative.

=== Fascist period ===
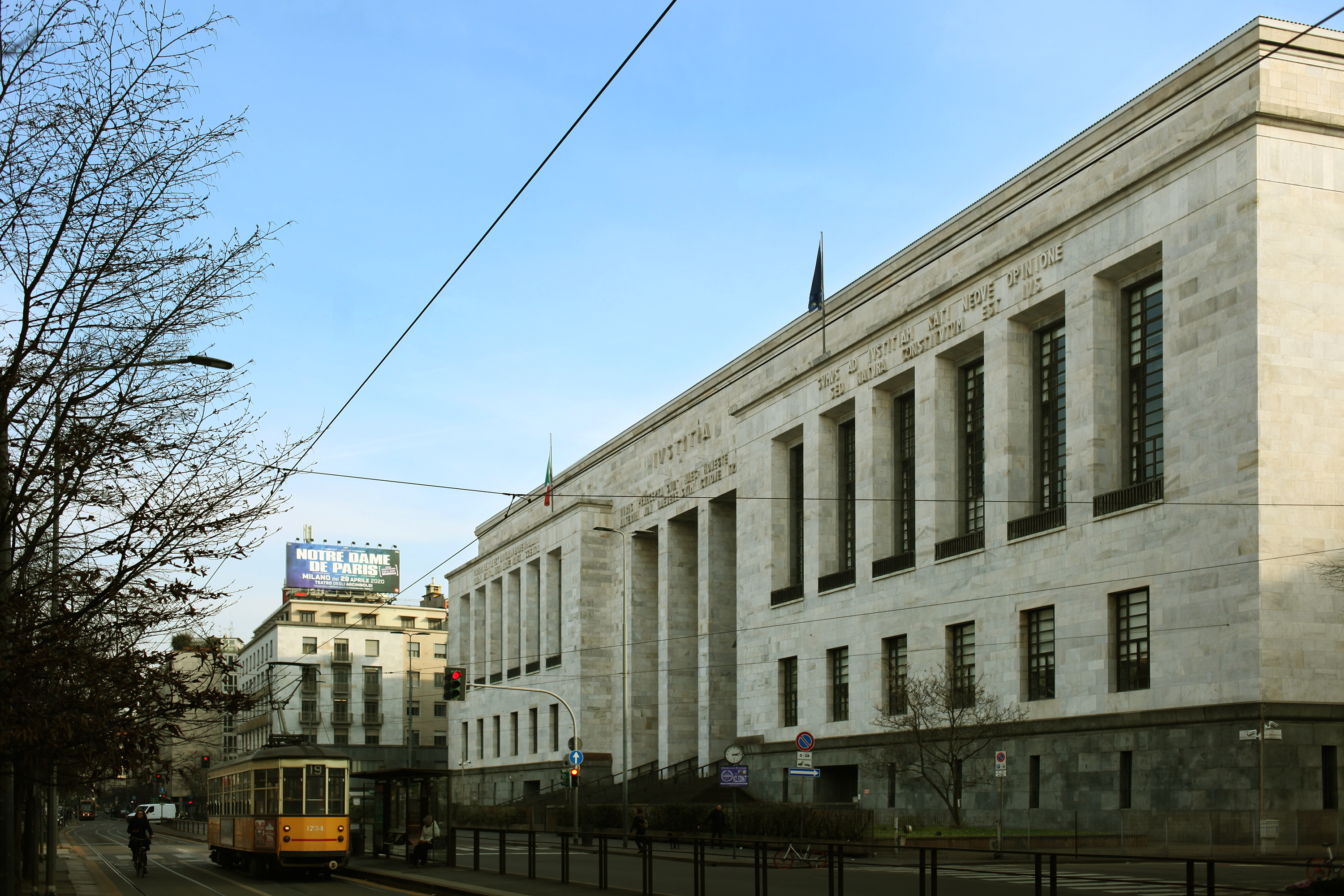
Milan Courthouse (1932–1940)

In 1923, with Giovannoni, he was appointed to review the current urban plan for Rome. Slum clearance, the need to improve traffic flow and Mussolini's desire to restructure Rome led to the radical proposal of La grande Roma (1925), which was quite removed from his earlier ideas. In fact, with its large-scale destruction of historic fabric in the interests of making the monuments of Classical Rome visible from a distance and providing straight processional avenues, it is nearly a volte-face.

Upgrading the city's image from historic confusion to unified classicizing grandeur also informed Piacentini's piano regolatore for Rome of 1931, which resulted in the creation of the Via dell'Impero (1932; now Via dei Fori Imperiali), the clearing of the area around the Mausoleum of Augustus (1934) and the demolition of the Spina del Borgo quarter (1936; with Attilio Spaccarelli) at St. Peter's, for the creation of Via della Conciliazione.

Outside Rome, Piacentini's alignment with Mussolini's view of commemorative architecture was expressed in monuments at Genoa (1923–31) and Bolzano (1926–8), the latter formed of columns carved into fasces. From 1928 to 1932 Piacentini executed the plan for the Piazza della Vittoria, the new centre of Brescia, a 'forum' created by the demolition of an old quarter. The style of the ensemble consists of a stripped classicism, while the various buildings are of an imposing scale, though of varying height, reflecting the architect's early concern for historically sensitive architecture. Similarly sober, monumental and neo-traditionalist is the Casa Madre dei Mutilati (1928), Rome.

Having evolved a style that he considered appropriate to the aspirations of the Italian people, Piacentini was obliged to defend it against explicit attacks by the Italian Rationalist architects representing avant-garde functionalism, who competed for the patronage of the Fascist state and organized themselves as the Gruppo 7 and later MIAR. Piacentini responded with his book Architettura d'oggi. Reproving the 'excesses' of the avant-garde, he asserted that the true objective of modern Italian architecture was to 'include from the artistic movements of Europe what is universal and what corresponds to contemporary society, grafting on to this our own special characteristics and taking into account the particular demands of our climate'.

In these years Piacentini rose to the highest prominence, becoming Italy's leading architect. In addition to being Mussolini's favoured agent for the reconstruction of central Rome, he was director of L'architettura, the journal of the Fascist Architects' Trade Union, a member of the Royal Academy of Italy, and professor of Urban Planning at the Sapienza University of Rome, of which he was also president. He was also a consultant to the planning departments of many of the major Italian cities.

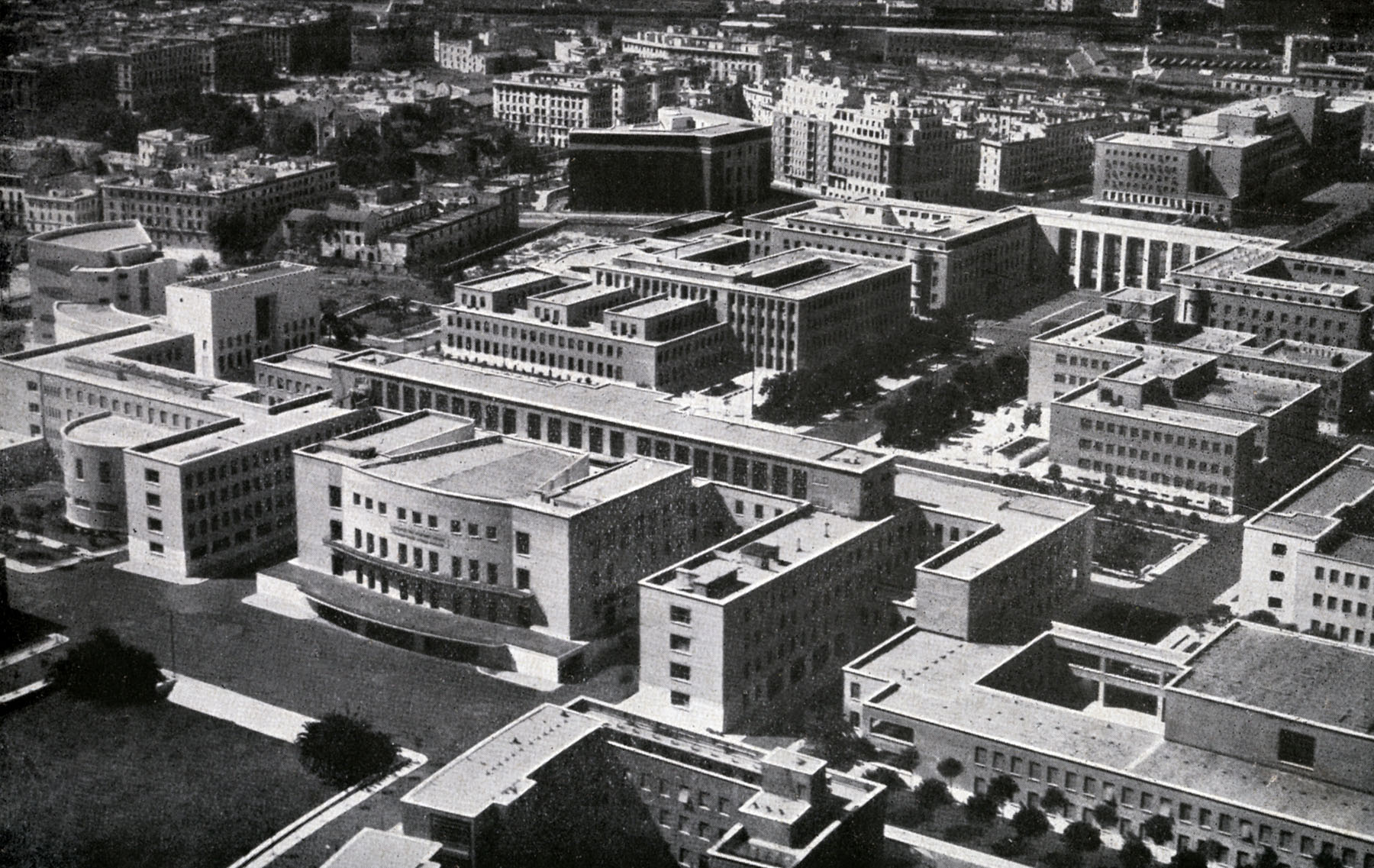
The new campus of Rome University (1935)

In 1932 he was appointed by Mussolini to supervise the plans for the Città Universitaria, Rome. In his role as architectural coordinator Piacentini also assumed responsibility in 1936 for the site of the Esposizione Universale of Rome (EUR), to be inaugurated in 1942. From its origins as a simple exhibition site the EUR was increasingly impelled by Piacentini into becoming a new monumental quarter of Rome. Consequently monumentality and permanence became the criteria for the competition contributions by the various artists and architects, who included Rationalists such as Giuseppe Pagano, Giuseppe Terragni and Adalberto Libera. Indeed they were required to forge a 'Fascist' style that was simultaneously grandiose, classical, modern and functional. Piacentini oversaw the whole programme, intervening in an increasingly dominant manner, and this led to the end of his friendship with Pagano and to his imposition of penalties on the architects responsible for the individual buildings. His pursuit of the ideal of classicism was based on the view that the exhibition site was to be a permanent symbol of the new Italian Empire and therefore to be fittingly equipped with architectural associations of the ancient empire. The site was only partly completed when the exhibition was postponed in 1940 and cancelled in 1943 following the fall of the Fascist regime.

=== Later career ===
After the fall of the Fascist regime he did not work as architect for several years. Among the few prestigious works he achieved was the Palazzo dello Sport (1958–60; with Pier Luigi Nervi) at the EUR site. Piacentini died in Rome in 1960. His architecture was for many decades the target of severe condemnation, but eventually a more sympathetic judgement emerged that asserted the independence of architecture from politics and reassessed his work in this light.

=== Architectural theories ===
Piacentini devised a "simplified neoclassicism" midway between the neo-classicism of the Novecento Italiano group (Gio Ponti and others) and the rationalism of the Gruppo 7 of Giuseppe Terragni, Adalberto Libera and others. His style became a mainstay of Fascist architecture in Rome, including the new university campus (Università di Roma La Sapienza, 1932) and the E.U.R district, of which he was not only designer, but also High Commissar by will of Benito Mussolini. His most notable contributions include the renovation of Brescia and Livorno, the Museo Nazionale della Magna Grecia in Reggio Calabria, the Milan Courthouse, and the restoration of the Rome Opera House (1928–1958).

== Works ==
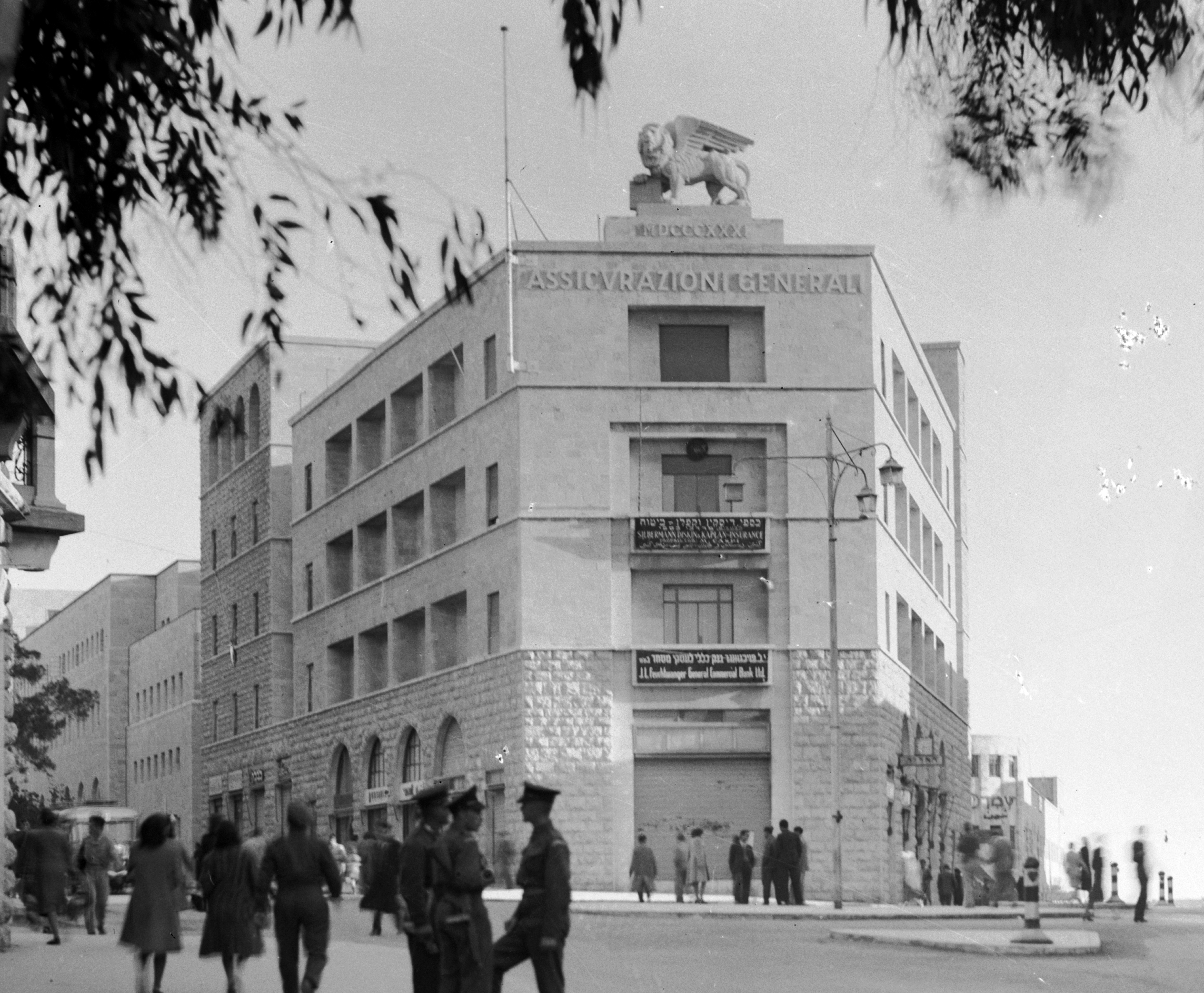
Generali Building

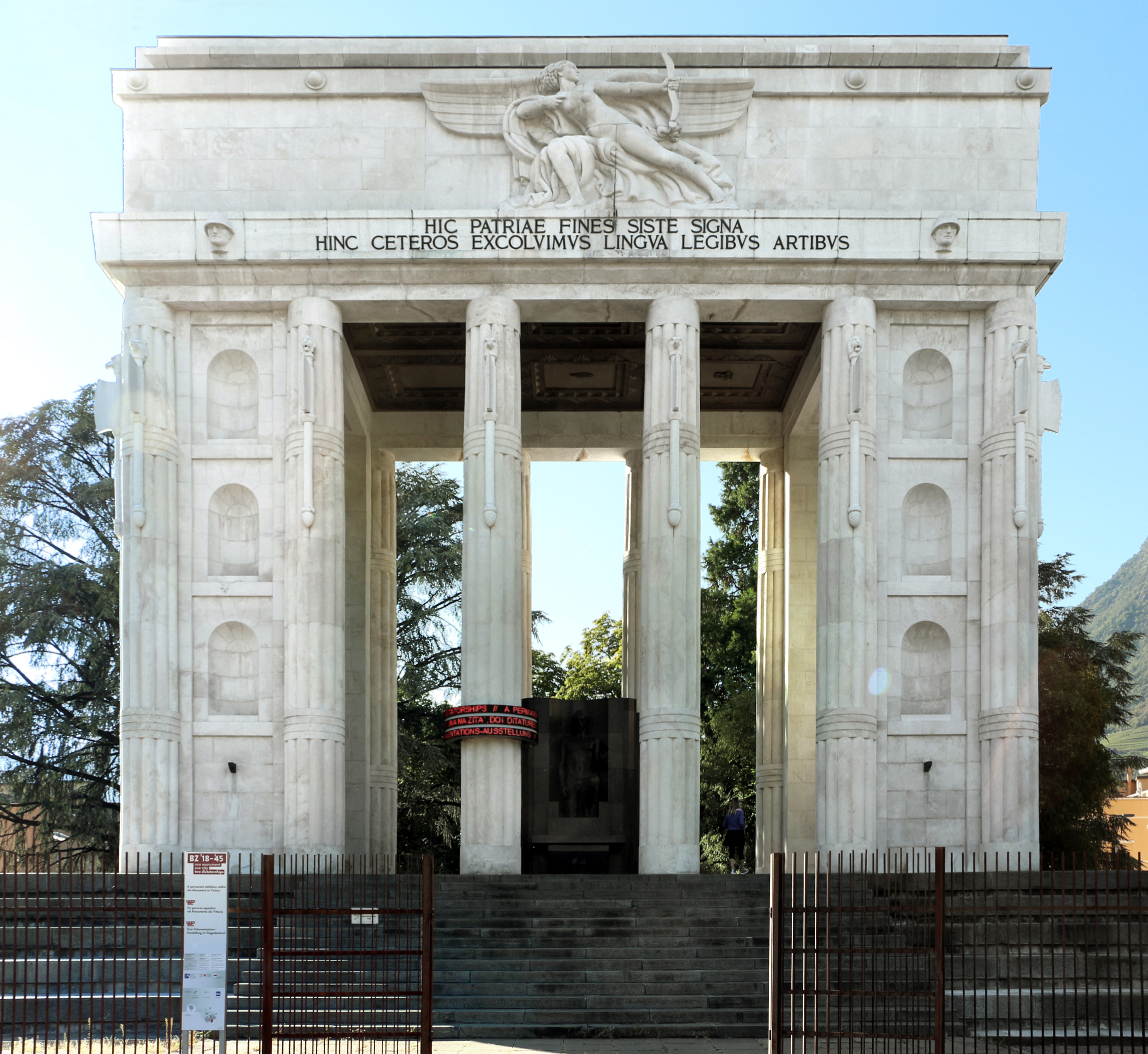
Victory Monument in Bolzano-Bozen

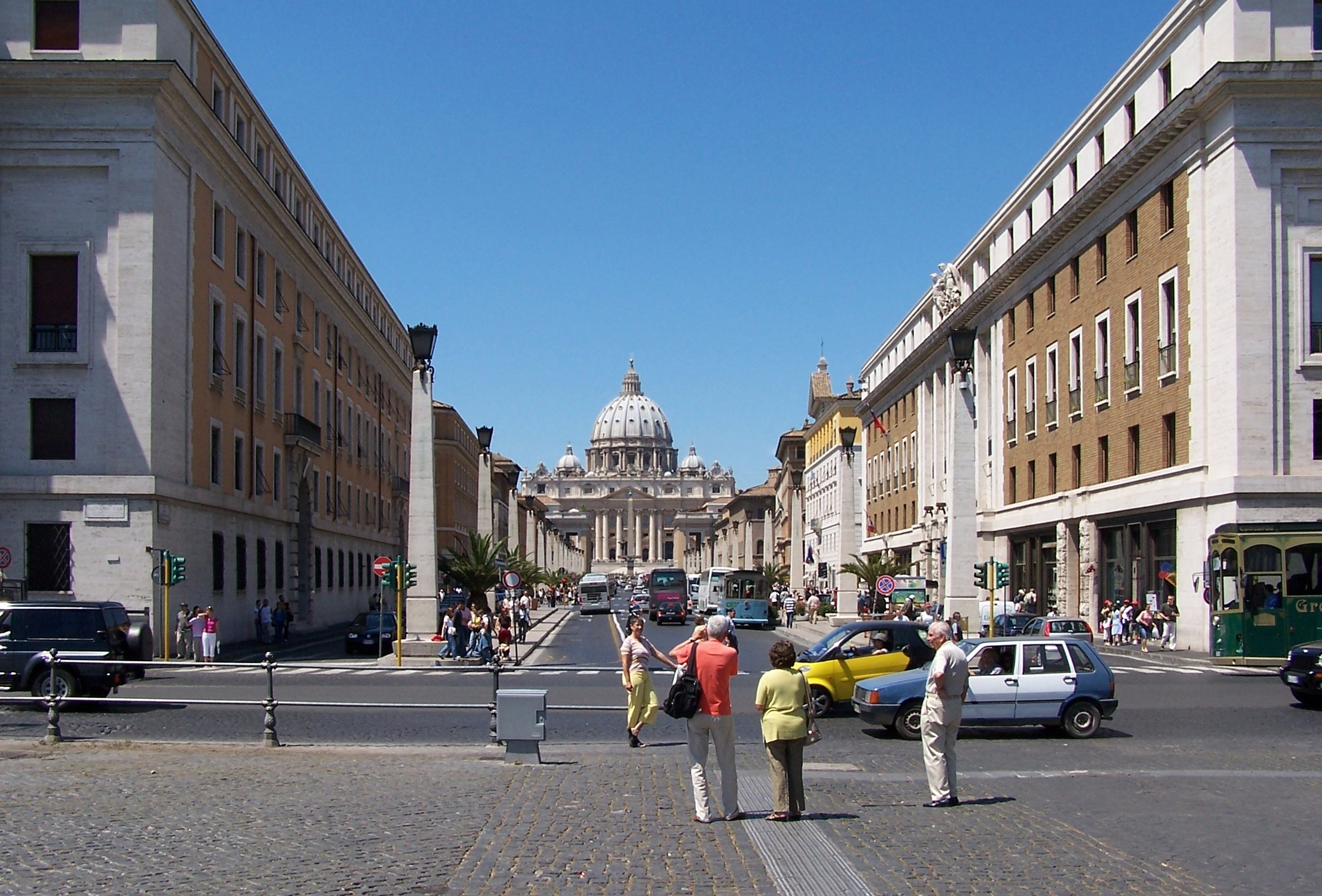
Via della Conciliazione a Roma

- Potenza, Progetto Ophelia (Ophelia Project), 1910
- Benghazi, Albergo Italia (Italia Hotel, known beforehand as Grande Albergo Roma) 1913 (along with architect Luigi Piccinato)
- Messina Courthouse, 1913–1928
- Benghazi, Benghazi Central Railway Station, 1916
- Acqui Terme, Villa Ottolenghi, 1920, with Federico d’Amato, later Pietro Porcinai completed the villa and the park.
- Benghazi, Interior of the City Hall, 1925
- Benghazi, Berenice Theatre, 1928
- Bolzano Victory Monument, 1926–1928
- Brescia, Piazza della Vittoria, 1927–1932
- Brescia, Torrione INA, 1930–1932
- Genoa, Arco della Vittoria, 1931
- Milan Courthouse, 1932–1940
- Bolzano, Army Headquarters, 1933–1935
- Jerusalem, Generali Building, 1934–1935
- Reggio Calabria, Museo Nazionale della Magna Grecia, 1932–1941
- Rome, church of Sacro Cuore di Cristo Re, 1920–1934
- Rome, restore of Teatro dell'Opera di Roma, 1926–1928
- Rome, planning for Sapienza University of Rome campus, 1935
- Rome, Via della Conciliazione, 1936–1950, with Attilio Spaccarelli
- Zagreb, Assicurazioni Generali Building, 1937
- Rome, planning for EUR district, 1938–1942
- Rome, Albergo degli Ambasciatori (Via Veneto), 1925–1932
- São Paulo, Matarazzo Building, 1939
- São Paulo, Palácio dos Bandeirantes, 1938
- Rome, Teatro Sistina (1946–1949)
- Rome, Cappella universitaria Divina Sapienza (1947–1952)
- Ferrara, Nuovo Palazzo della Ragione (1954–1956)
- Rome, Palazzo dello Sport (1960), in collaboration with Pier Luigi Nervi

== Sources ==
- Lupano, Mario (1991). Marcello Piacentini. Rome-Bari: Laterza.
- Pisani, Mario (2004). Architetture di Marcello Piacentini. Le opere maestre. Rome: Clear.
- Scarrochia, Sandro (1999). Albert Speer e Marcello Piacentini: l'architettura del totalitarismo negli anni trenta. Milan: Skira.
- De Rose, Arianna S. (1993). Marcello Piacentini: Opere 1903–1926. Modena: Franco Cosimo Panini.
- Monzo, Luigi (2013). "Trasformismo architettonico – Piacentinis Kirche Sacro Cuore di Cristo Re in Rom im Kontext der kirchenbaulichen Erneuerung im faschistischen Italien". Kunst und Politik. Jahrbuch der Guernica-Gesellschaft (in German). 15: 83–100.
- Beese, Christine (2016). Marcello Piacentini. Moderner Städtebau in Italien (in German). Berlin: Dietrich Reimer Verlag GmbH.
- Monzo, Luigi (October 2016). "Review to Beese, Christine: Marcello Piacentini. Moderner Städtebau in Italien, Berlin 2016". Architectura. Zeitschrift für Geschichte der Baukunst (in German). 45 (1): 88–91.
