= Giovanna Bruna Baldacci =

Italian composer, pianist, and poet

Giovanna Bruna Baldacci (19 November 1886 – ? after 1910) was an Italian composer, pianist and poet. She studied piano and composition at the Istituto Musicale in Florence with Francesco Cilea and Moretti. After completing her studies, Baldacci worked as a concert pianist in Italy and Switzerland. She also taught choral singing and contributed articles to professional journals. In 1910 she won first prize for composition in an Italian Lyceum competition, for her work Madrigale.

== Life ==
Giovanna Bruna Baldacci was born on 19 November 1886 in Pistoia, Italy. She was a composer, pianist and poet. She studied piano and composition at the Istituto Musicale (now called the Florence Conservatory) in Florence with Francesco Cilea and Moretti. At the institute she also studied under Edgardo Del Valle de Paz and Felice Boghen. Baldacci qualified as a piano teacher at the age of fifteen, and her licence to teach singing a year later.

After completing her studies, Baldacci worked as a concert pianist in Italy and Switzerland. She also taught choral singing at schools, and contributed articles to professional journals on music and literature. In 1910 she won first prize for composition in an Italian Lyceum competition, for a work for three voices and piano called Madrigale. Baldacci's compositions include choral works for children, songs and pieces for the piano.

Baldacci's date of death is unknown, but is thought to be after 1910.

== Works ==
Baldacci composed mostly songs and piano pieces. Selected works include:

- I mesi dell’anno, children's chorale
- Madrigale for three voices and piano
