= Corrado Balducci =

Italian Catholic theologian and exorcist

- Born: May 11, 1923; Milan, Italy
- Died: September 20, 2008 (aged 85); Rome, Italy
- Education: Pontificia Accademia Ecclesiastica
- Occupation: Theology

Corrado Balducci (May 11, 1923, in Italy – September 20, 2008 in Italy) was a Catholic theologian of the Vatican Curia, a close friend of the pope, a long-time exorcist for the Archdiocese of Rome, and a Prelate of the Congregation for the Evangelization of Peoples and the Society for the Propagation of the Faith. He has written several books about the subliminal messages in rock and metal music, diabolic possessions, and extraterrestrials.

== Career ==
Balducci graduated in 1954 from Pontificia Accademia Ecclesiastica, the Vatican training institute for priests who will be future papal ambassadors, or nuncios. Balducci worked as an exorcist for the Archdiocese of Rome. He was also a member of the Congregation for Evangelization and the Society for the Propagation of the Faith.

== Views ==
Balducci upheld the views of the Catholic Church, and advocated treating ostensible cases of demonic possession with exorcism.

He also condemned rock music, which he believed "includes satanic subliminal messages, pushing evil and suicide".

Balducci reportedly "defended the existence of extraterrestrial life, and invited the Catholic Church to reconsider its position on this issue". Balducci told a 1998 magazine interviewer that he believed "UFO entities were not demonic" and that they should be investigated by science "and not the world of angels or the Virgin Mary or the demons...not as a divine or demonic incident, but a physical reality". Balducci's remarks were later misrepresented and distributed on the Internet by UFOlogists as "a Vatican announcement of UFO reality".

== Media ==
=== Books ===
- ISBN 978-85-86812-08-8 Diabo: ...Vivo e Atuante no Mundo, O (paperback, 2004)
- ISBN 978-88-04-37999-7 Il diavolo (Grandisaggi) (1994)
- ISBN 978-88-384-1561-6 Adoratori del diavolo e rock satanico (1991)
- ISBN 978-0-8189-0586-5 The Devil "Alive and Active in Our World" (paperback, 1990)
