= Teatro Sistina =

Coordinates: 41.904281°N 12.486961°E

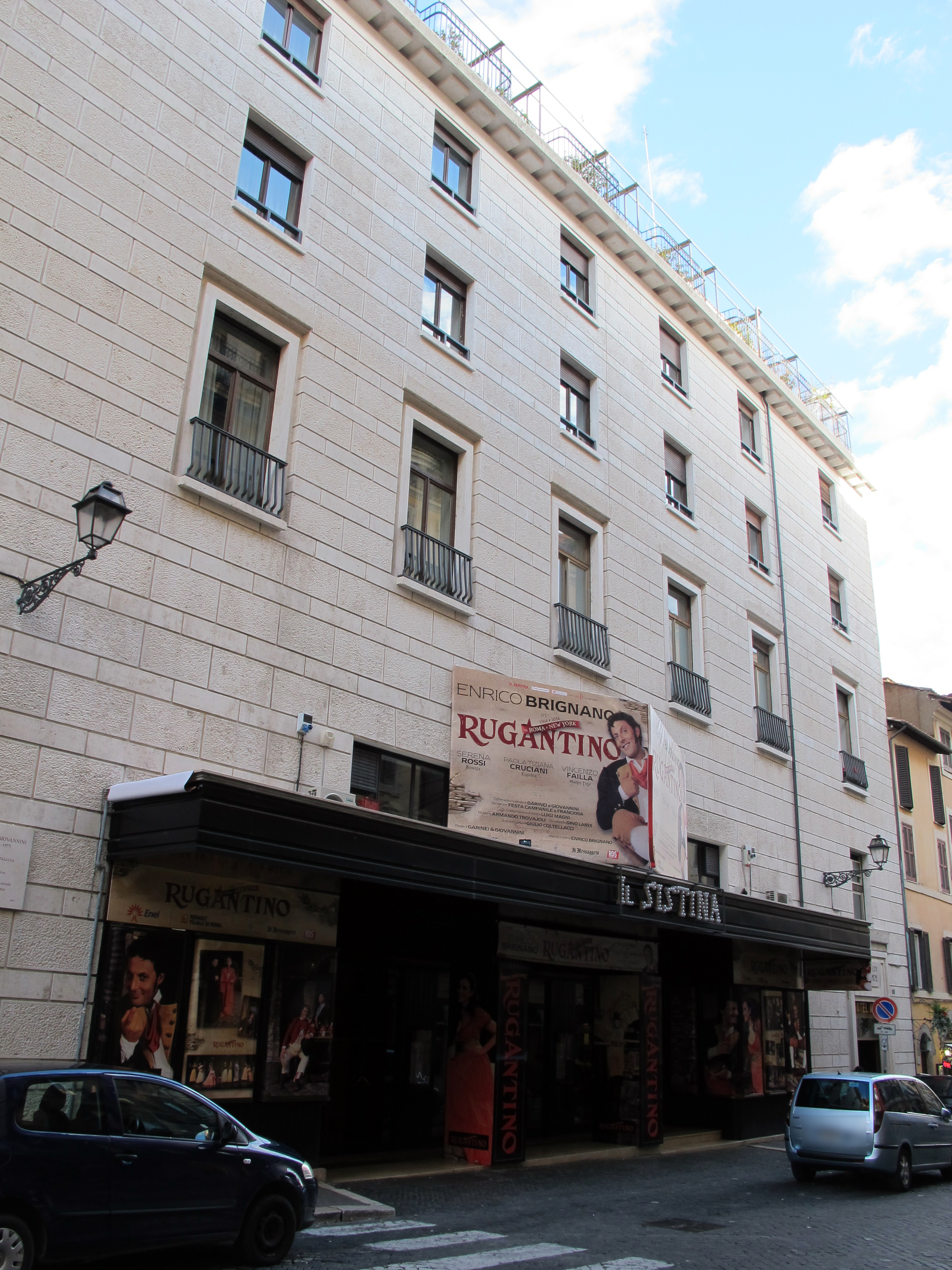
- Front of theatre

- Location within Rome
- Address: Via Sistina 129
- Location: Rome, Italy
- Type: Theatre

Construction
- Built: 1946
- Opened: 1949
- Architect: Marcello Piacentini

Website
- https://www.ilsistina.it/

The Teatro Sistina is a theatre in Rome, Italy.

The building, designed by Marcello Piacentini, was begun in 1946 on the former site of the Pontifical Ecclesiastical Polish Institute. It was inaugurated on 28 December 1949 as a cinema, but later become mostly used for theatrical and cabaret representations. In the 1960s it was directed by Pietro Garinei and Sandro Giovannini, who here premiered some of their main successes, such as Rugantino, Attanasio cavallo vanesio, Aggiungi un posto a tavola and others.
