= Valadier =

Valadier is a surname. Notable people with the surname include:

- Auguste Charles Valadier (1873-1931), pioneering Franco-American dental surgeon
- Giuseppe Valadier (1762-1839), Italian architect and designer, urban planner and archeologist
- Jean Valadier (1878-1959), French lawyer, administrator and politician

== See also ==
- The Valadiers, American vocal group, active intermittently from 1959
