= Giuseppe Baldacci =

Italian architect

Giuseppe Baldacci (3 April 1856 – ?) was an Italian architect.

He was born in Florence and studied at the Florentine Istituto Tecnico and the Accademia di Belle Arti. He then joined the architects Castellazzi and Cesare Spighi in designing the reliefs for the church of Santa Trinita. Baldacci designed a small villa on Via Mascagni in Florence for Odoardo Salvestri and restored the stables for Doctor Folli in Borgo San Jacopo. In 1887, he won a prize of one thousand lire for designing sheds and stables in a Renaissance style for a park.
