= Riace bronzes =

Pair of ancient Greek bronze statues

The Riace Bronzes
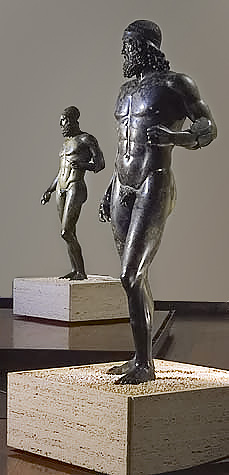
- Statue A (the "Young") in the foreground and Statue B (the "Old") at the Museo Nazionale della Magna Grecia in 2007.
- Year: c. 460 BC (Statue A); c. 430 BC (Statue B)
- Type: Bronze sculptures
- Location: Museo Nazionale della Magna Grecia, Reggio Calabria, Italy

The Riace bronzes (Italian: Bronzi di Riace, [ˈbrondzi di riˈaːtʃe]), also called the Riace Warriors, are two full-size Greek bronze statues conventionally designated Statue A (the "Young") and Statue B (the "Old"). They depict two nude, bearded men standing slightly over life size; they originally carried weapons and wore headgear that is now lost. They were cast by the lost-wax process and include materials other than bronze in the eyes, lips and other details. The Riace bronzes are among the few surviving originals of large-scale Greek bronze statuary from the 5th century BC. Statue A is generally dated to around 460 BC and Statue B to around 430 BC.

The two statues were found in the sea on 16 August 1972 off Riace Marina, in the Metropolitan City of Reggio Calabria. They are kept in the Museo Nazionale della Magna Grecia in Reggio Calabria.

Their ancient setting and the monument for which they were made are unknown; there is no agreement on the identity of the figures, their provenance or their makers. Although they were found together, most scholars consider them to have been made by different artists at least two decades apart, and it has not been established whether they originally belonged to the same statuary group.

== History ==
=== Bronze statuary in the 5th century BC ===
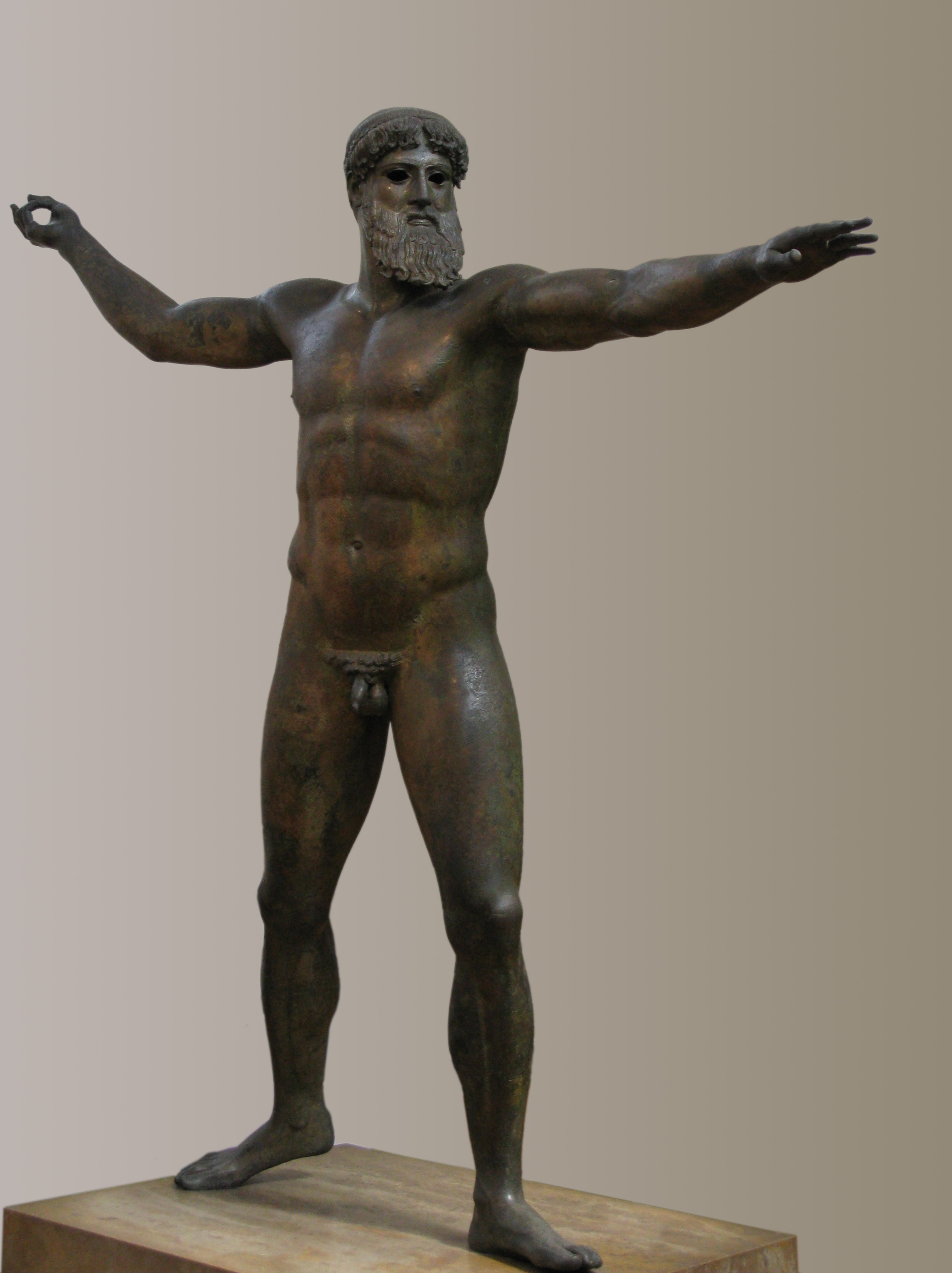
The so-called Artemision Bronze, c. 460 BC, one of the few surviving large Greek bronzes of the 5th century BC. National Archaeological Museum, Athens.

The Riace bronzes are generally regarded as Greek originals of large-scale 5th-century BC bronze statuary rather than Roman-period copies. By the 5th century BC bronze had become the preferred material for full-length Greek statuary. Between the end of the Archaic period and the Classical period, hollow lost-wax casting gradually replaced the construction of large figures from assembled sheets of hammered metal and made it possible to cast life-size statues in separate parts that were subsequently joined. Very little of this production survives: with few exceptions, ancient bronze statues were lost or melted down for their metal, and the appearance of many famous Greek originals is known mainly through Roman marble copies.

A tradition of bronze sculpture also existed in Southern Italy and Sicily, from which few originals survive; schools of bronze workers were active at Rhegion and Crotone from the late 6th century BC and especially during the first half of the 5th century BC. Klearchos and Pythagoras of Rhegion, to whom the tradition assigns a role in the formal development of the Severe style, worked at Rhegion, while the sculptor Patrokles and the bronze worker Dameas worked at Croton; Dameas was active in the second half of the 6th century BC and made the statue of the athlete Milo of Croton described by Pausanias at Olympia. No surviving original can be securely attributed to Pythagoras. The presence of these bronze-working schools is not sufficient to establish where the Riace statues were made, and their provenance remains uncertain. The two statues also differ stylistically: A has features of the Severe style, while B shows elements associated with the tradition of Polykleitos. A 5th-century BC date is also compatible with radiocarbon dating of the organic components of the casting cores, although the tests do not allow a narrower chronology. Radiocarbon analyses published in 2012 yielded calibrated ranges of 512–398 BC for Statue A and 511–400 BC for Statue B, at 95.4% probability. As these ranges almost entirely overlap, they cannot establish the approximately thirty-year difference suggested by stylistic dating.

=== Discovery ===
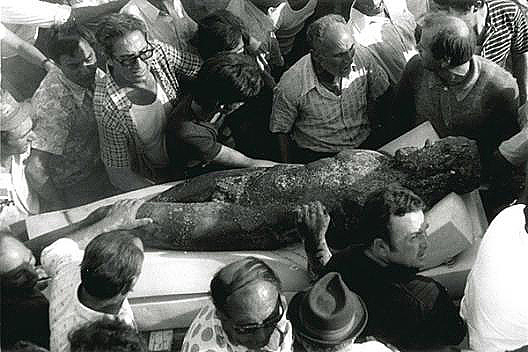
One of the statues on the beach after recovery

On 16 August 1972 Stefano Mariottini, while freediving in the waters off Riace Marina, saw part of a dark-coloured shoulder projecting from the sand; after touching it he recognized the material as bronze and began clearing the sand from a human figure lying on its right side. During his dives he noticed, about one metre from the first statue, a big toe and a knee barely emerging from the sand, and thus located a second statue lying on its back beneath a thin layer of sediment. The two statues lay a short distance apart near the submerged reef of Porto Forticchio, in the Agranci district, about 220 metres from the shoreline. In his account published in 2009, Mariottini recalled a seabed about 6 metres deep, whereas the report filed on 17 August 1972 recorded a depth of about 10 metres. The distances and topographical references in the report of the underwater unit of the Messina Carabinieri Legion are, however, approximate. The Carabinieri divers' report from 1972 described Statue B as lying on its back and almost completely exposed, and Statue A as face down, entirely buried and about 1.5 metres away. This differs in part from Mariottini's later recollection of Statue A lying on its right side about one metre from the first statue. No photographs or films are known of the statues in their position on the seabed before recovery.

Mariottini left the line of a marker buoy tied to the arm of the first statue and, with the help of relatives and friends, managed to locate superintendent Giuseppe Foti at his home in Reggio Calabria. Returning by boat to Riace on the afternoon of 16 August, he took bearings on land and completely covered the two statues with sand to protect them. On 17 August he went to the museum in Reggio Calabria, where he delivered a written report to Foti; Foti arranged the recovery and notified the Carabinieri divers group in Messina. The group was then in Syracuse assisting an attempt by Enzo Maiorca to set a freediving record and could not intervene at Riace until 21 August. Foti also instructed Enrico Natoli to carry out an underwater survey of the site and entrusted a letter to be delivered to the Guardia di Finanza so that the area could be watched. Recovery operations began on 21 August. Statue B was recovered on 21 August and Statue A on 22 August. During the recovery, Statue A fell back to the seabed before being brought ashore. Photographs and film footage of the operations document the use of underwater lifting bags to raise the statues. On the beach the statues were laid on improvised wooden and foam-rubber beds and then transported on a Carabinieri van.

A film reconstruction of the recovery was made at Briatico using two fiberglass copies. It was produced for the RAI series Nel mare degli antichi in 1986 and directed by Pippo Cappellano.

The official report filed on 17 August 1972 as protocol no. 2232 with the Superintendency of Antiquities of Calabria in Reggio states:

...declares that on the 16th of this month, while diving for the purpose of fishing, at Riace, approximately Km 130[...] on the SS nazionale Ionica, at a distance of about 300 metres from the shore and at a depth of about 10 metres, he found a group of statues, presumably bronze. The two emerging ones represent nude male figures, one lying on its back, its face covered by a flowing, curly beard, with arms open and one leg advanced relative to the other. The other lies on one side with one leg bent and bears a shield on its left arm. The statues are dark brown except for some lighter areas, are perfectly preserved, with clean modelling and no evident encrustations. The dimensions are approximately 1.80 cm [sic].

On the left side of the typewritten report is a handwritten note in red signed by Giuseppe Foti:

This report follows the telephone communication of 16 August 1972, received at 21:00, which reported the discovery.

==== Subsequent underwater searches ====
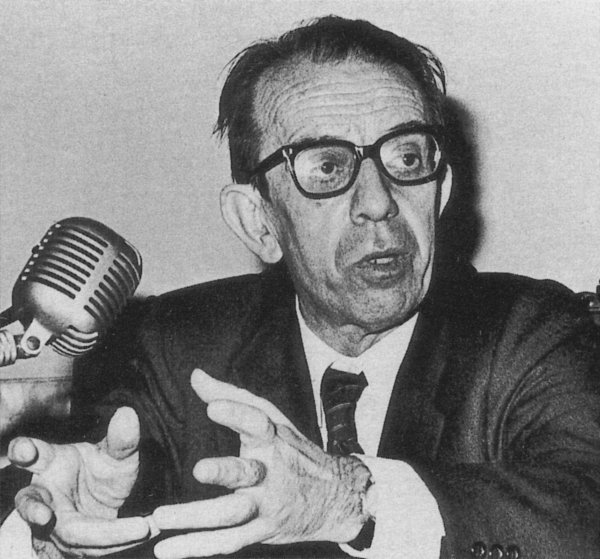
Nino Lamboglia, who directed the 1973 search campaign in the area where the statues were found.

Searches by Carabinieri divers continued until 23 August 1972 to establish whether other material was present. No further finds were reported. On 18 November 1972 the Centro Sperimentale di Archeologia Sottomarina of the Istituto di Studi Liguri attempted a survey of the seabed, but weather conditions forced the operation to be abandoned; during the visit the find area was nevertheless located and marked with Mariottini's assistance. From 28 August to 4 September 1973 Nino Lamboglia directed an eight-day campaign from the vessel Cycnulus, searching for remains of a possible shipwreck and other finds connected with the statues. The excavation covered an area of 26 by 6.50 metres. It reached a depth of about one metre; above the natural clay, Lamboglia distinguished a layer of fine sand, a gravel layer about 10–20 cm thick and an upper layer of coarse sand. In the gravel layer that had covered the face of Statue A, 28 lead rings about 6–7 cm in diameter and a fragment of a shield grip were found. Some amphora fragments found beneath the armpit of Statue A were regarded by Lamboglia as material carried by sea currents and unrelated to the statues. The 1973 campaign found no remains of a vessel that could be connected with the transport of the bronzes. Lamboglia proposed that any wreck might have been carried elsewhere by currents while the statues remained in the find area.

In 1981 Alice Freschi directed a second campaign in the same area, entrusted to the Aquarius cooperative. Pottery fragments, chiefly amphora fragments, were recovered together with a piece of keel fitted with two bronze through-pins and dated to the Roman period. Between April and May 2024 a research campaign at Porto Forticchio lasted 32 days. On 6 November 2024 the Italian Ministry of Culture announced the resumption of underwater archaeological excavation, coordinated by a Ministry archaeologist with support from the Messina Carabinieri underwater unit; instrumental surveys carried out in October 2022 and spring 2024 were followed by removal of sediment with a water dredge. In a 2026 study Rosolino Cirrincione and co-authors reviewed the results of the 1973, 1981 and 2024 campaigns, noting that no traces of a shipwreck had been found in the Riace area, and interpreted the 28 lead rings, initially associated with ship equipment, as elements of fishing nets that had become caught among the rocks.

==== Alternative hypotheses about the discovery ====
Priority in reporting the 1972 discovery became the subject of legal proceedings. Giuseppe Braghò reported that four young men from Riace, Cosimo and Antonio Alì, Domenico Campagna and Giuseppe Sgrò, claimed from the outset to have discovered the statues before Mariottini. Sky TG24 reported that on 17 August the four filed a report before Mariottini's written declaration and that in 1977 the Court of Rome awarded Mariottini a finder's reward of 125 million lire, also taking account of Giuseppe Foti's note about the telephone call received at 21:00 on 16 August. Rebaudo instead identifies the Court of Reggio Calabria as the deciding court, without giving the date of the decision or the amount of the award in that passage. In 2024 Mariottini stated that no appeal was filed after the first-instance decision. In 2005, after consulting reports held by the Superintendency and other historical documentation on the discovery in the historical archive of the archaeological museum in Reggio Calabria, Braghò proposed that the 1972 records indicated a third statue and attributes such as shields, helmets and spears that were not recovered with the two bronzes. He drew particular attention to the phrase "a group of statues" in Mariottini's report and to the description of a figure with open arms and one leg advanced. Mariottini rejected the hypothesis of a third statue in 2024, stating that he had reported only the two bronzes he saw on 16 August 1972.

In 2000 R. Ross Holloway repeated a story according to which divers had found the statues off Sicily and intended to sell them abroad; after the transfer was interrupted, they were supposedly hidden by the submerged reef at Riace for later recovery. Holloway placed both the alleged first discovery in Sicily and the transfer of the statues to Calabria in the 20th century.

On 6 May 2025 the public prosecutor's office in Syracuse opened a case file, with no suspects under investigation, to reconstruct events alleged to have taken place in 1971 off Brucoli, where, according to the hypothesis being examined, the bronzes had been found before the discovery reported at Riace. According to ANSA, Mimmo Bertoni said that in 1971, when he was ten years old, he saw four covered statues being transferred from a small boat to a larger one and recognized a spear, helmet and shield on one of them. In an interview published the same year in Archeologia Viva, Bertoni instead spoke of five statues loaded by divers; he also said that he had been ten years old at the time and that among the shapes he had seen a helmeted head, a shield and several spears. In May 2025 several newsrooms anonymously received a photograph said to show a bronze statue about two metres high, similar to Statue A, supported by two divers with Brucoli in the background. In 2026 Cirrincione and co-authors, in a study aimed at testing the Syracusan hypothesis, interpreted the succession of patinas and encrustations as compatible with a long stay of the statues on seabeds 70–100 metres deep, followed by a much shorter period on shallow sandy seabeds; among the environments compatible with the first phase, they also identified the seabed off Brucoli, 70–90 metres deep and characterized by muddy sediments and coralligenous formations.

== Description ==
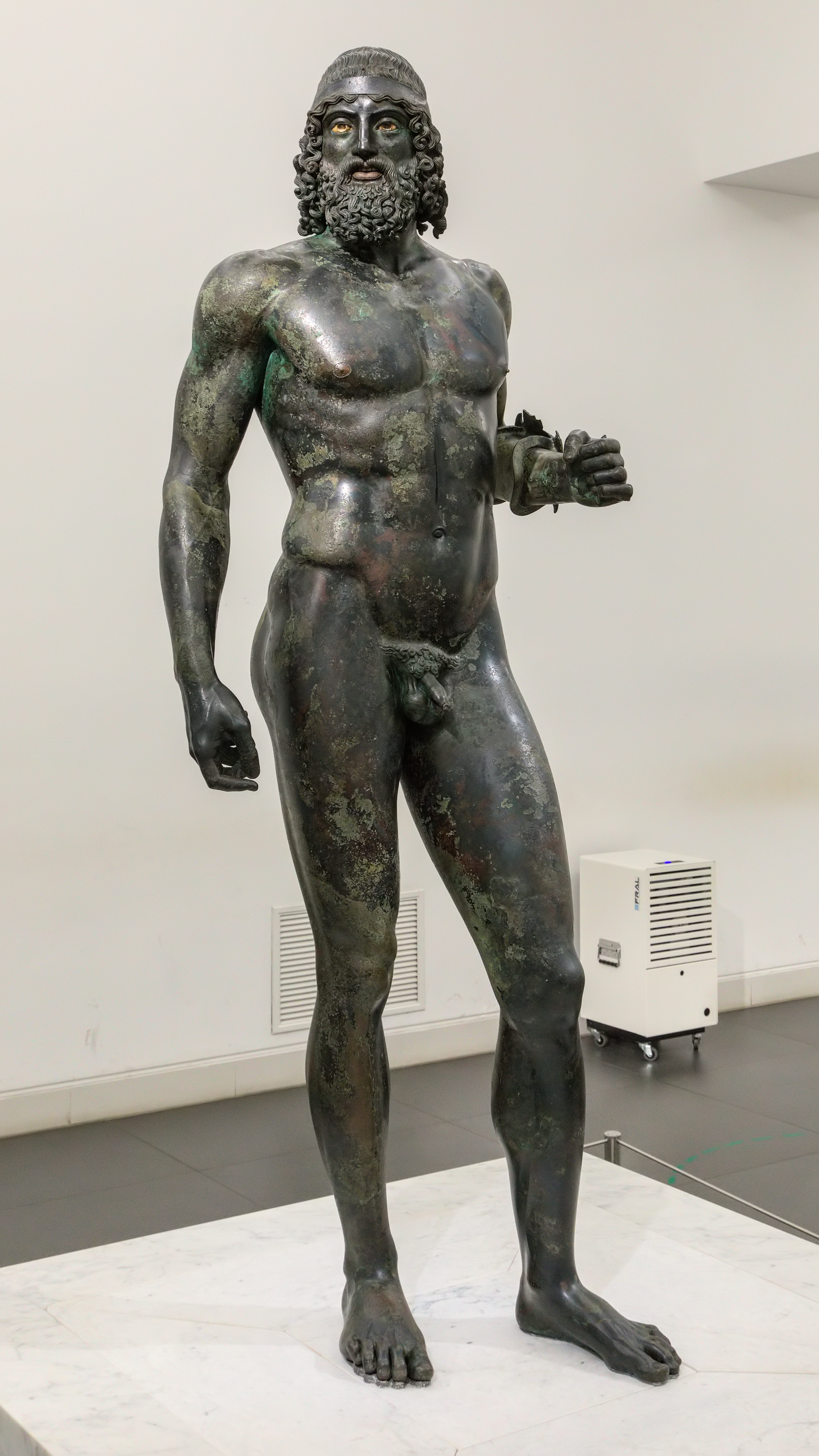
Statue A

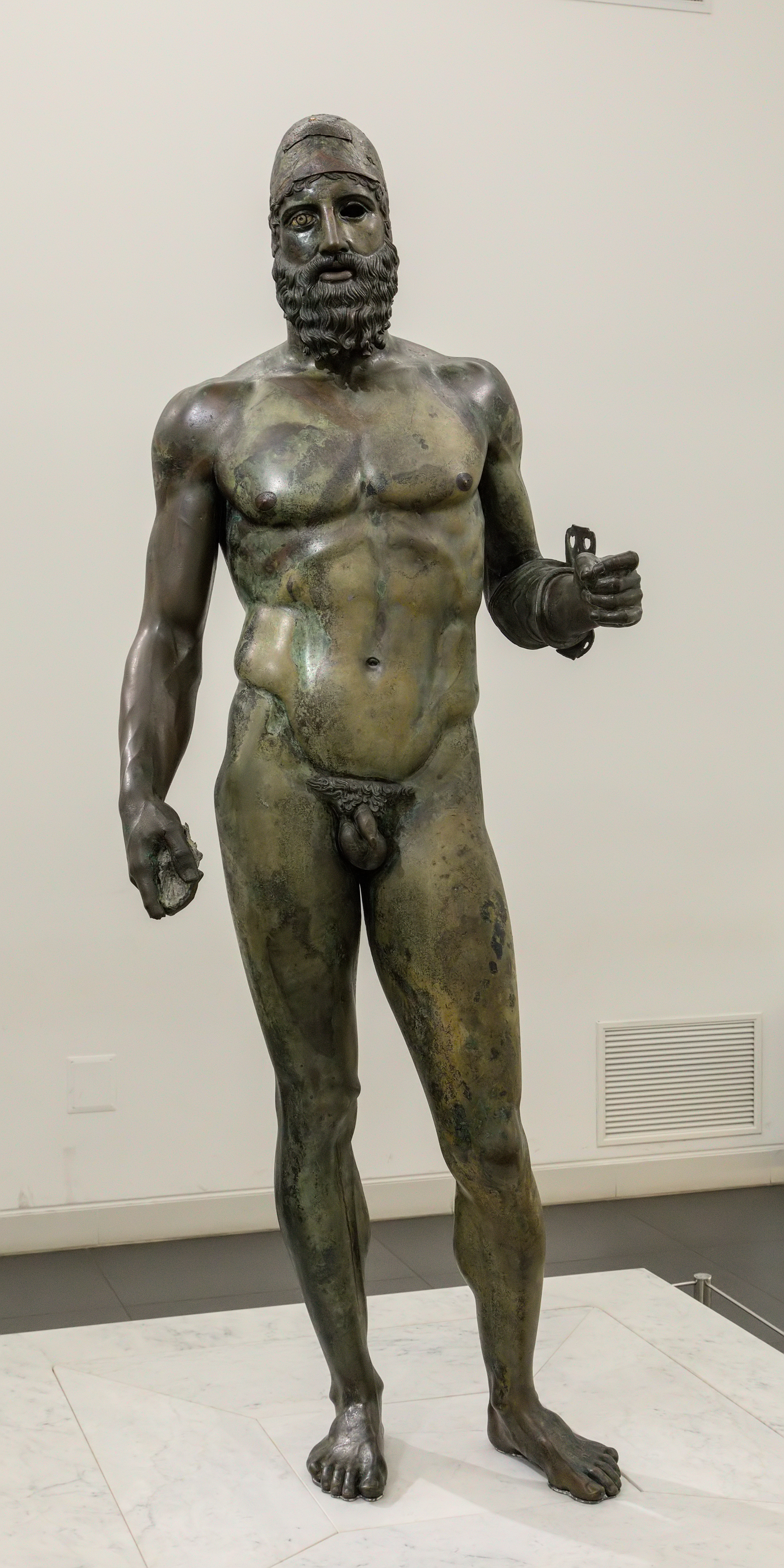
Statue B

The statues depict two nude, bearded men standing slightly over life size. Excluding the tenons—the projections beneath the feet used to secure them to their bases—Statue A is about 1.98 m high and Statue B about 1.97 m. Photogrammetric surveys show nearly identical poses: in Statue B the shoulders and torso tilt slightly to the right, while Statue A has a more pronounced turn of the head and wider separation of the feet. In both statues both feet touch the ground: the right foot, corresponding to the weight-bearing leg, is slightly set back, while the left leg is slightly bent at the knee. A appears tenser and more dynamic, whereas B has a more relaxed pose and a stronger bend at the right hip. The musculature of Statue A is more strongly marked; in B it is less pronounced and the torso forms a more evident S-curve.

=== Statue A ===
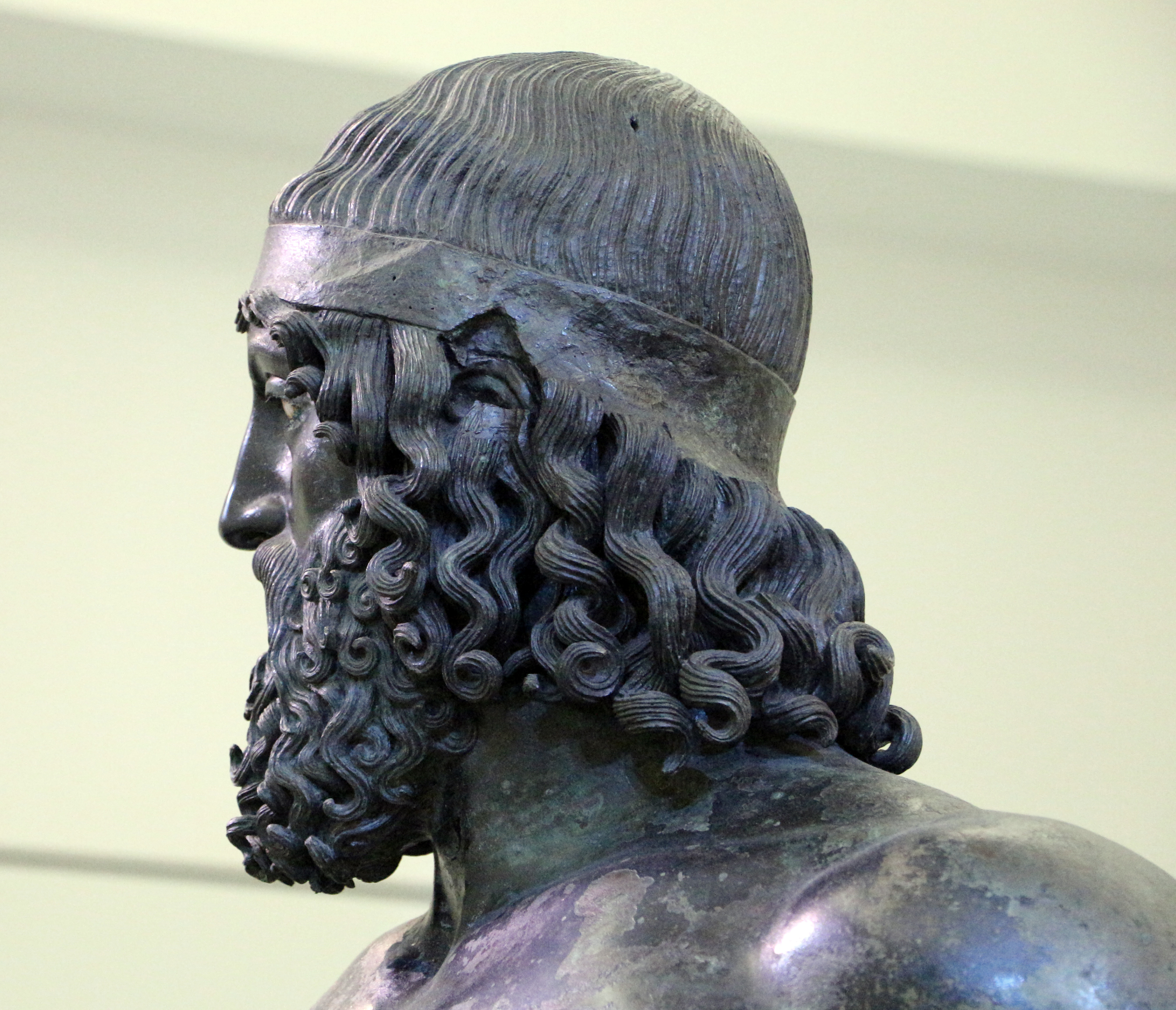
Detail of the hair of Statue A.

Statue A, inventory no. 12801, has a head cast in a single piece, with the hair modelled even on the top of the head, where the traditional reconstruction places a helmet. The mouth is half open; in addition to the copper lips found on both statues, Statue A retains teeth made from silver sheet worked in relief without heating, by cold repoussé, and attached to a structure inserted into the clay core. The outer locks of the hair and beard are three-dimensional, cast separately and attached with dovetail joints.

=== Statue B ===
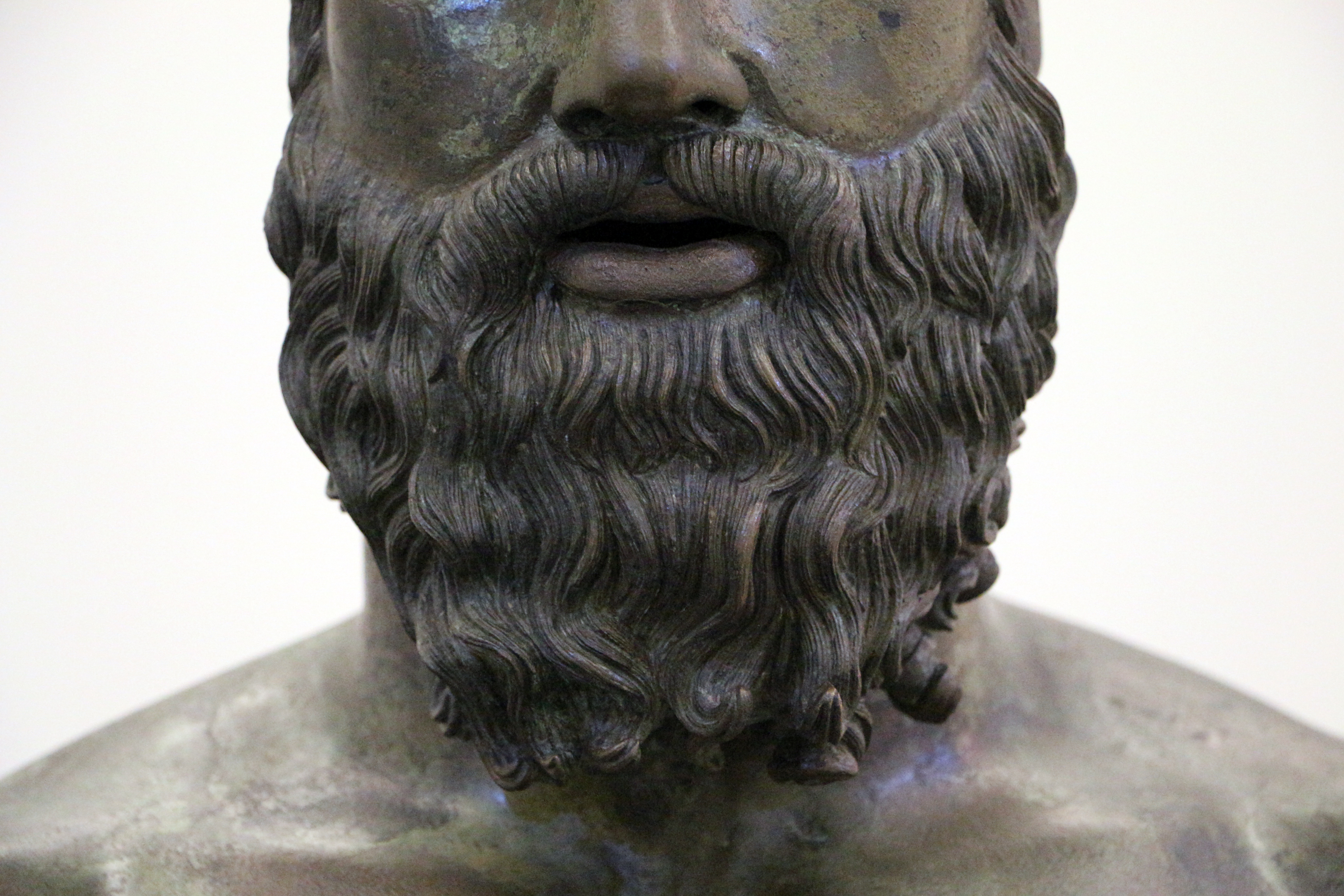
Detail of the beard of Statue B.

Statue B, inventory no. 12802, has a head cast in two parts: the cranial cap was cast separately and joined by poured metal; it has no hair and an irregular surface, with gaps that in places pass through the bronze. The beard and hair were modelled directly in the wax layer used for casting, with hair limited to the frontal locks and a few tufts on the neck; the mouth is closed and no teeth are visible.

=== Casting technique and materials ===
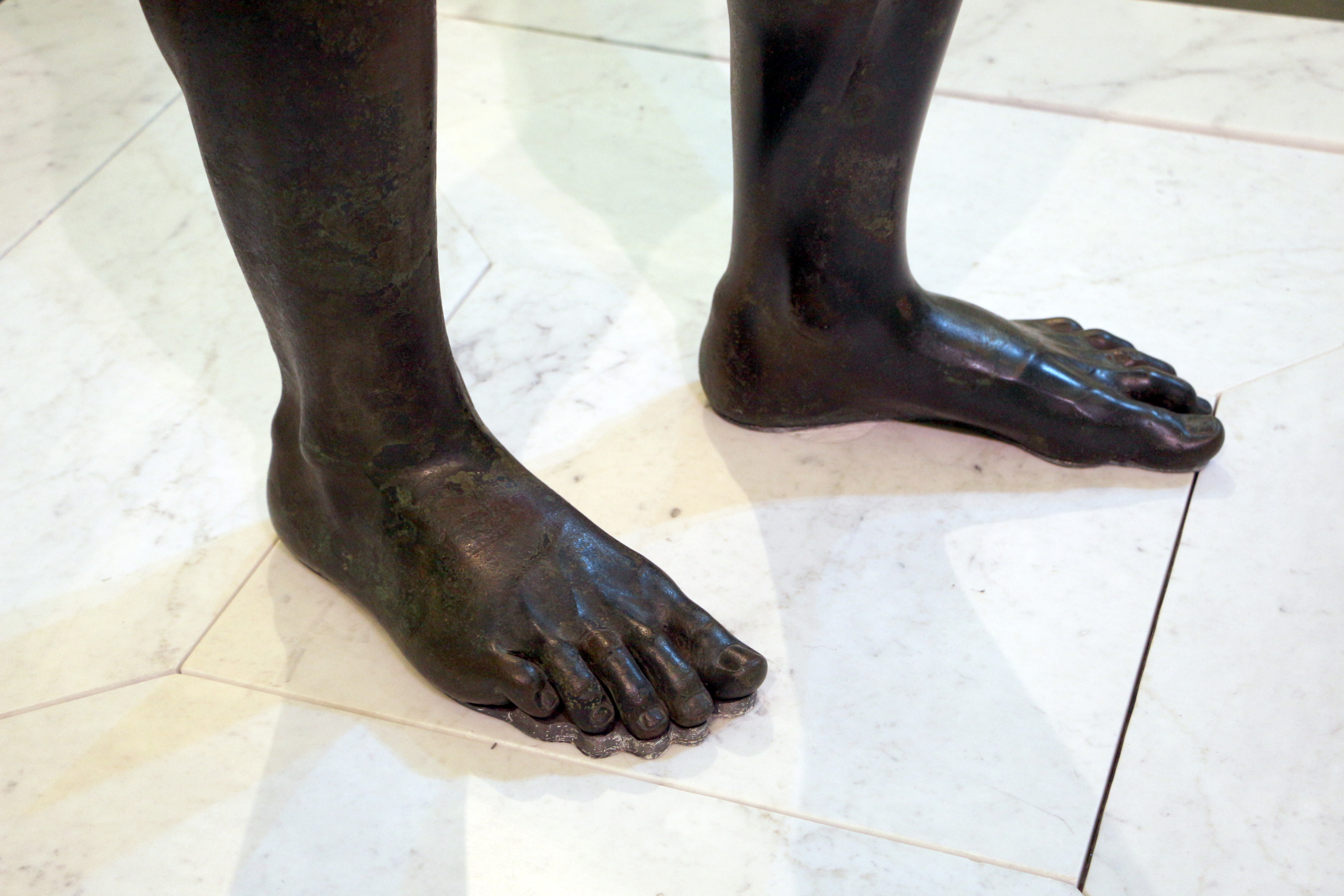
The feet of Statue A; the front part was made by the indirect lost-wax process.

The right arm and the left forearm of Statue B, as far as the porpax—the loop that supported the shield on the forearm—are ancient replacements rather than original parts. Chemical analysis found a lead content of 9–14 per cent in these parts, compared with about 1 per cent in the rest of Statue B and in Statue A; the structure of their casting cores also differs from that of the rest of Statue B. The replacement arms were made later and in a different place from the rest of the statue, but it cannot be established whether the substitution repaired damaged parts or deliberately altered the figure's appearance. The date of the replacement remains debated: a 2016 study described a late Hellenistic or Roman date as the prevailing interpretation, whereas a 2026 study proposed the fourth century BC. The casting core of the replacement right arm of Statue B could not be radiocarbon-dated because the samples did not contain sufficient organic material.

Between 1993 and 1996 the Istituto Centrale per il Restauro (ICR) directly examined the interiors of the statues and reconstructed several stages of their manufacture. On the basis of micro-excavation of the casting cores, the statues have been reconstructed as having been made predominantly by the direct lost-wax method, in which wax is modelled over the inner core; the front portions of both feet and the replacement arms of Statue B were instead made by the indirect method, in which the wax layer is produced from a mould taken from a model. This interpretation is not universally accepted: other studies assign a greater role to the indirect method in the manufacture of the statues. In both statues the torso and legs, rear parts of the feet, head, arms, hands, testicles, penis, forefeet and third toe of each foot were cast separately; the cranial cap of Statue B was also separately cast.

The separately cast parts were then joined by cast-on welding: the edges were brought together with a gap between them, closed below and at the sides with refractory clay capable of withstanding high temperatures, into which liquid bronze was poured; the excess metal was then removed and the exterior surface smoothed. By the 5th century BC the technique could produce strong joins even at highly stressed points such as the middle of the foot; to increase the contact surface, a series of oval cavities could be prepared and filled one by one in successive pours. In large bronze nudes, joints followed recurring patterns at the neck, the attachment of the arms to the torso, the genital region, the middle of the foot and the attachment of the central toes.

The casting cores of both statues, except for the replacement arms of Statue B, consist of concentric or parallel layers of clay arranged around iron supports. In Statue A the clay was made less fluid by adding animal hair, chiefly sheep's wool; in Statue B vegetable material was used instead, mainly leaves, straw and small flakes of wood. The cores were modelled differently: in Statue A the core does not reproduce the anatomical volumes, which were shaped primarily in wax; in Statue B, especially on the front of the legs, the outer layers of the core were trimmed into a rough but recognizable anatomical form. The same difference appears in the torso: in Statue A the inner core is relatively flat and little articulated, and the muscles and rib cage were formed mainly in the wax layer, whereas in Statue B the core more clearly reproduces the groin, abdomen and ribs. Measurements published in 1999 give an average bronze wall thickness of about 12 mm for Statue A and about 9 mm for Statue B; the difference is linked to the different methods of modelling the core and wax.

Materials other than bronze were used to give greater realism to the face and parts of the body: the eyelashes, lips and nipples are copper. The eyes contain inlays of different materials and colours, including white calcite for the sclera and glass paste for the iris. The surviving eye of Statue B is made from five stone elements of different colours: a black cylindrical capsule, a light-coloured iris, a black pupil inserted into a white stone and a reddish stone for the caruncle at the inner corner of the eye.

=== Original attributes ===
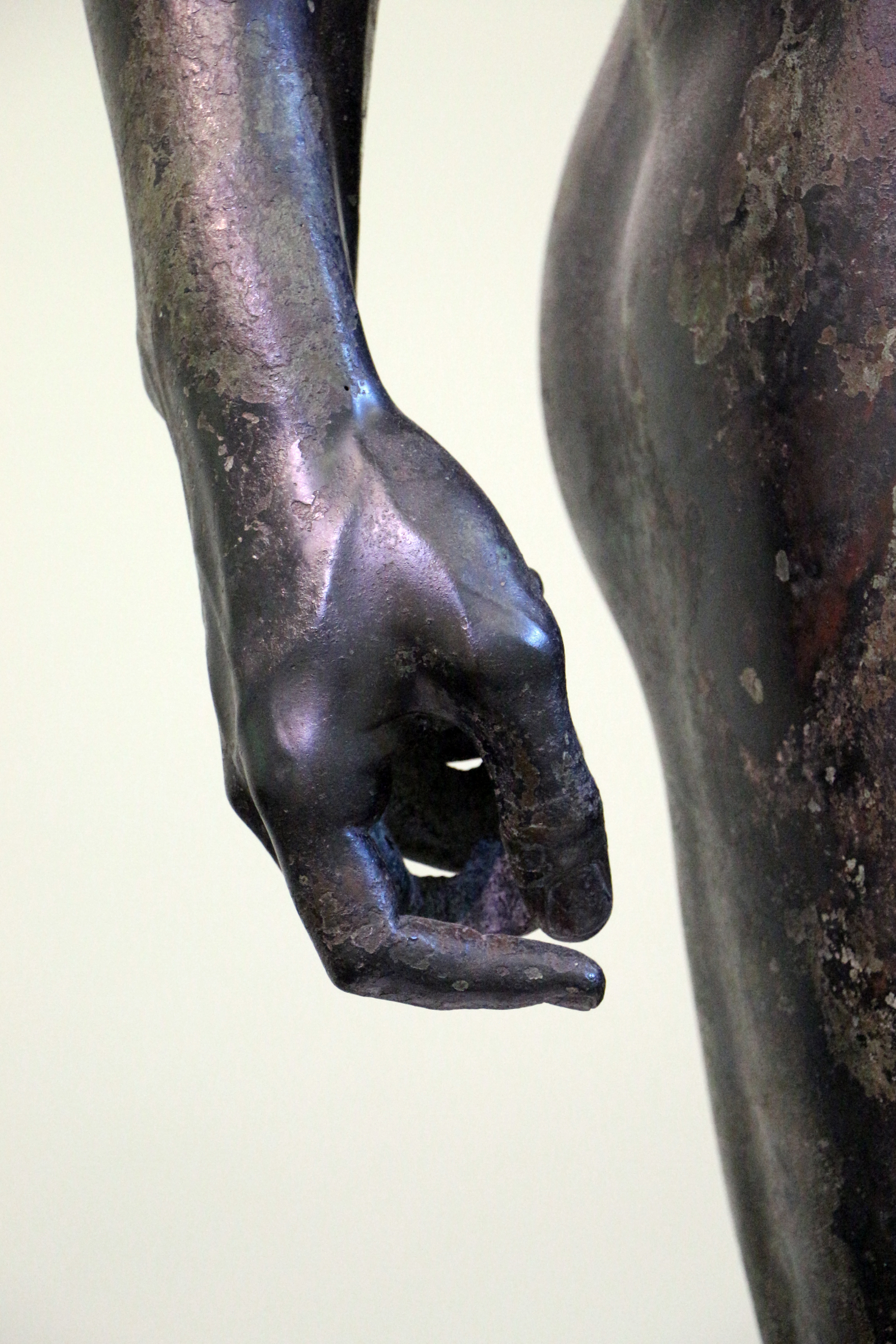
The right hand of Statue A, studied in 2012 to reconstruct the form of the object it held.

According to the traditional reconstruction, surviving traces suggest that both figures carried a long shaft in the right hand and a shield on the left arm, and wore helmets or other headgear whose form remains debated. Other reconstructions, particularly for Statue B, propose different weapons and headgear. The hair of Statue A is modelled even on the top of the head; together with the surviving attachment devices, this has been interpreted as evidence of a helmet, although its original presence remains debated. Rebaudo considers the deformation of the occipital area of Statue B compatible either with the profile of a raised helmet or with bulky headgear; on the forehead are two copper plates with a hammered finish, which Claudio Sabbione proposed in 1984 to interpret as a leather or textile cap worn beneath the helmet.

In 2012 the right hand of Statue A was recorded with a structured-light 3D scanner to reconstruct in three dimensions the cavity left by the object originally held in the hand. The three-dimensional model allowed the cavity to be measured in fourteen cross-sections; a cylinder about 30 mm in diameter can pass through all of them without leaving the cavity. The cavity might also have contained a curved or non-cylindrical object; the reconstruction judged most likely is nevertheless a spear, with a shaft about 30 mm in diameter and about 2.20 m long, while the hypothesis of a horse rein is less compatible with the shape of the hand.

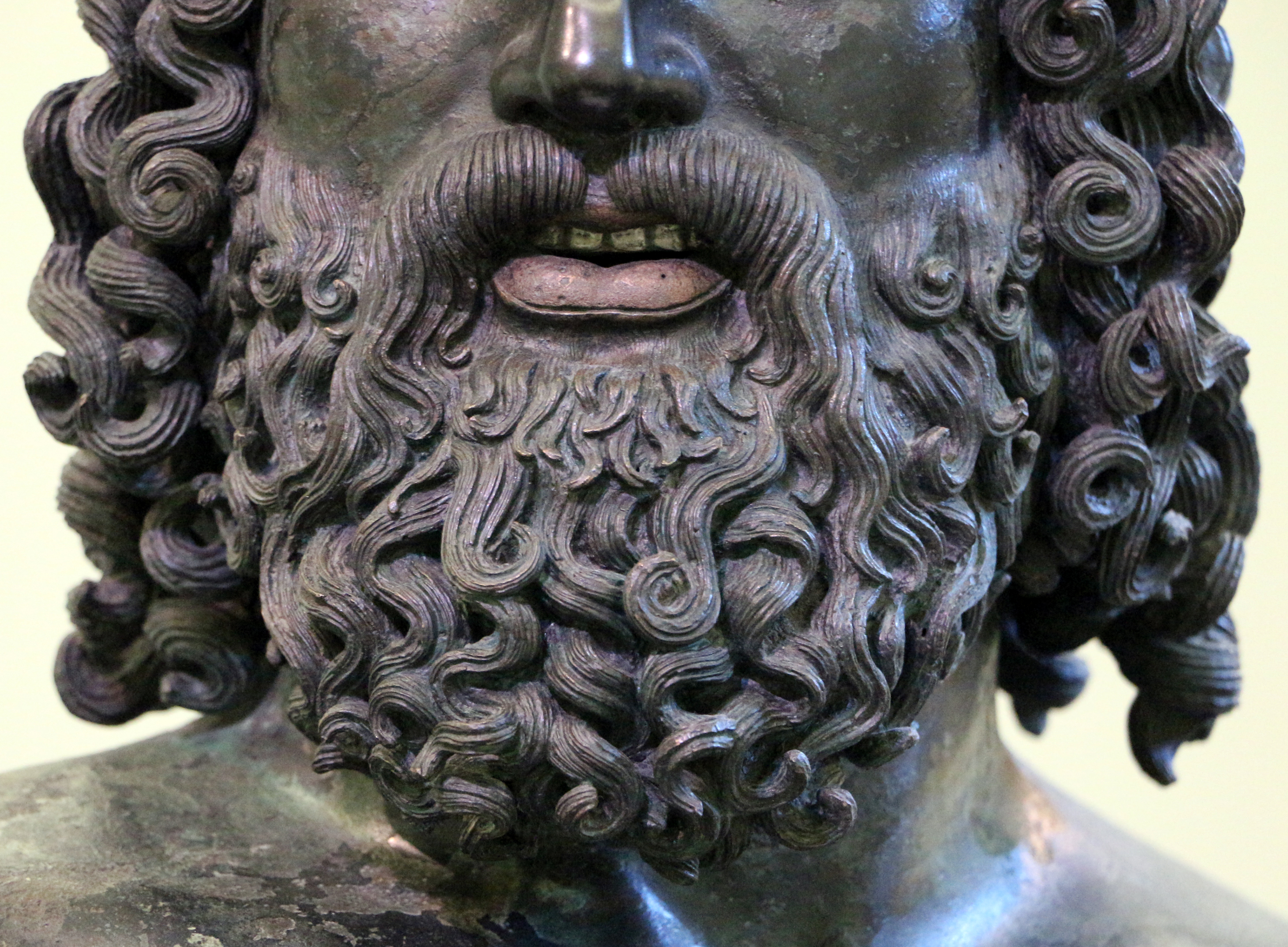
Detail of the beard of Statue A.

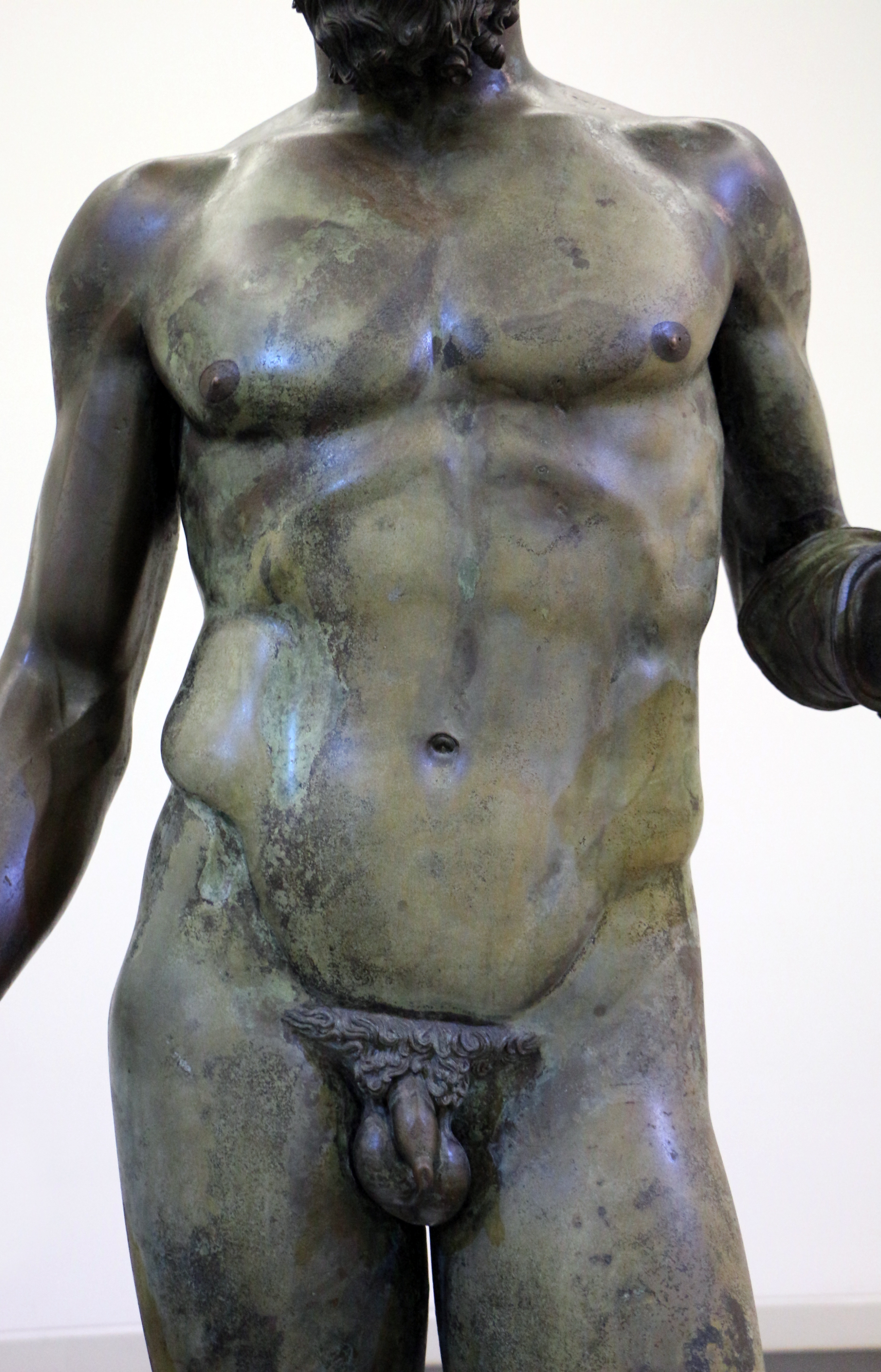
The torso of Statue B, in which the bend of the right hip is more pronounced.

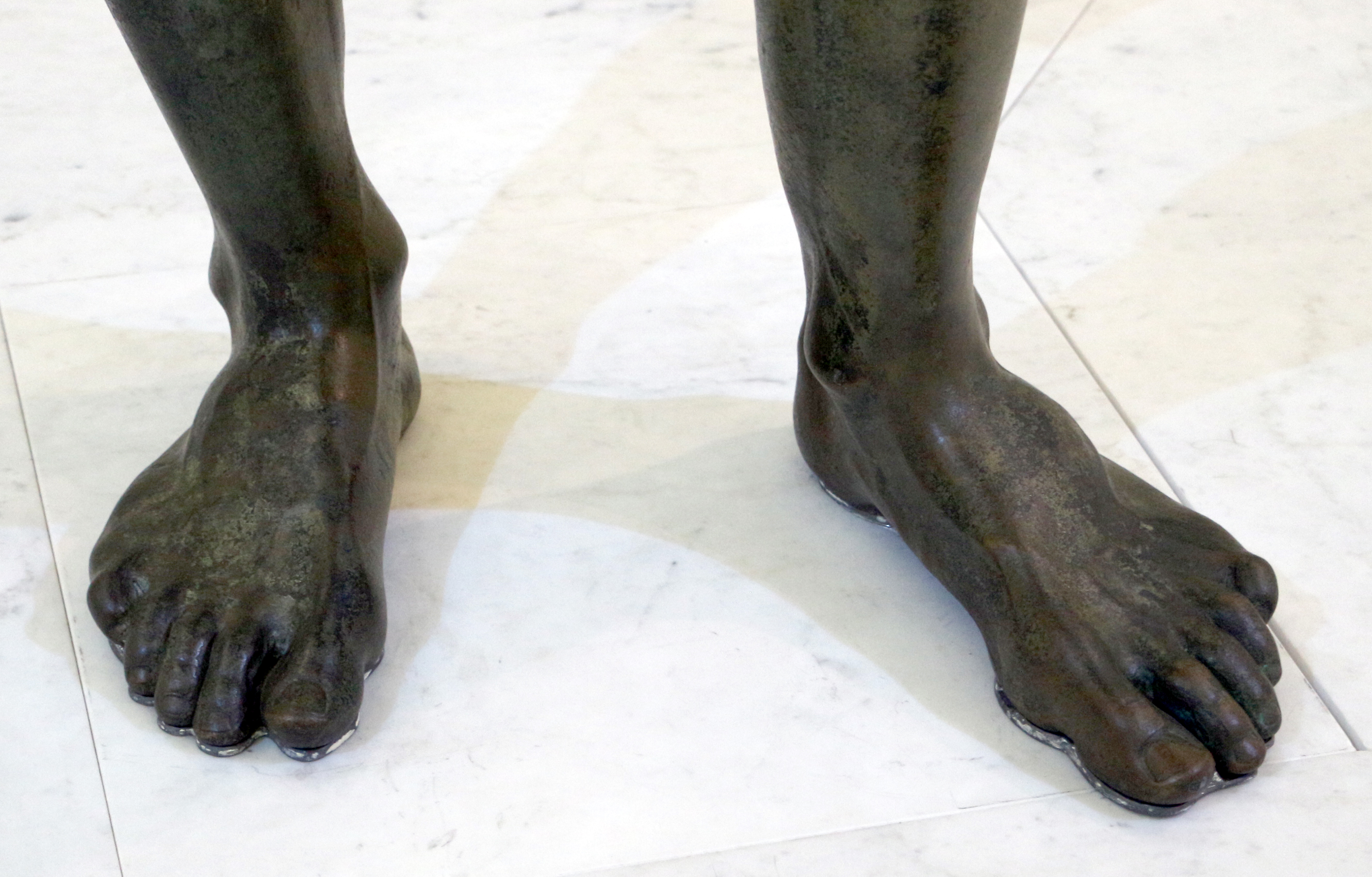
Detail of the feet of Statue B.

== Restoration and conservation ==
=== 1972–1980 restoration ===
After recovery, the statues underwent an initial restoration at the Museo Nazionale della Magna Grecia in Reggio Calabria, which continued until 1975. In January 1975 they were transferred to the restoration centre of the Archaeological Superintendency of Tuscany in Florence and entrusted to the restorers Renzo Giachetti and Edilberto Formigli.

During the Florence restoration, residual ancient casting core material was only partly removed by mechanical and chemical methods. The interiors were emptied through openings in the heads and soles of the feet, using steel rods and tubes, hydrogen peroxide baths and jets of compressed water; sections of the internal iron rods and much of the core material in the torsos were removed, but residues remained in the legs and partly in the torsos.

=== 1992–1995 restoration ===
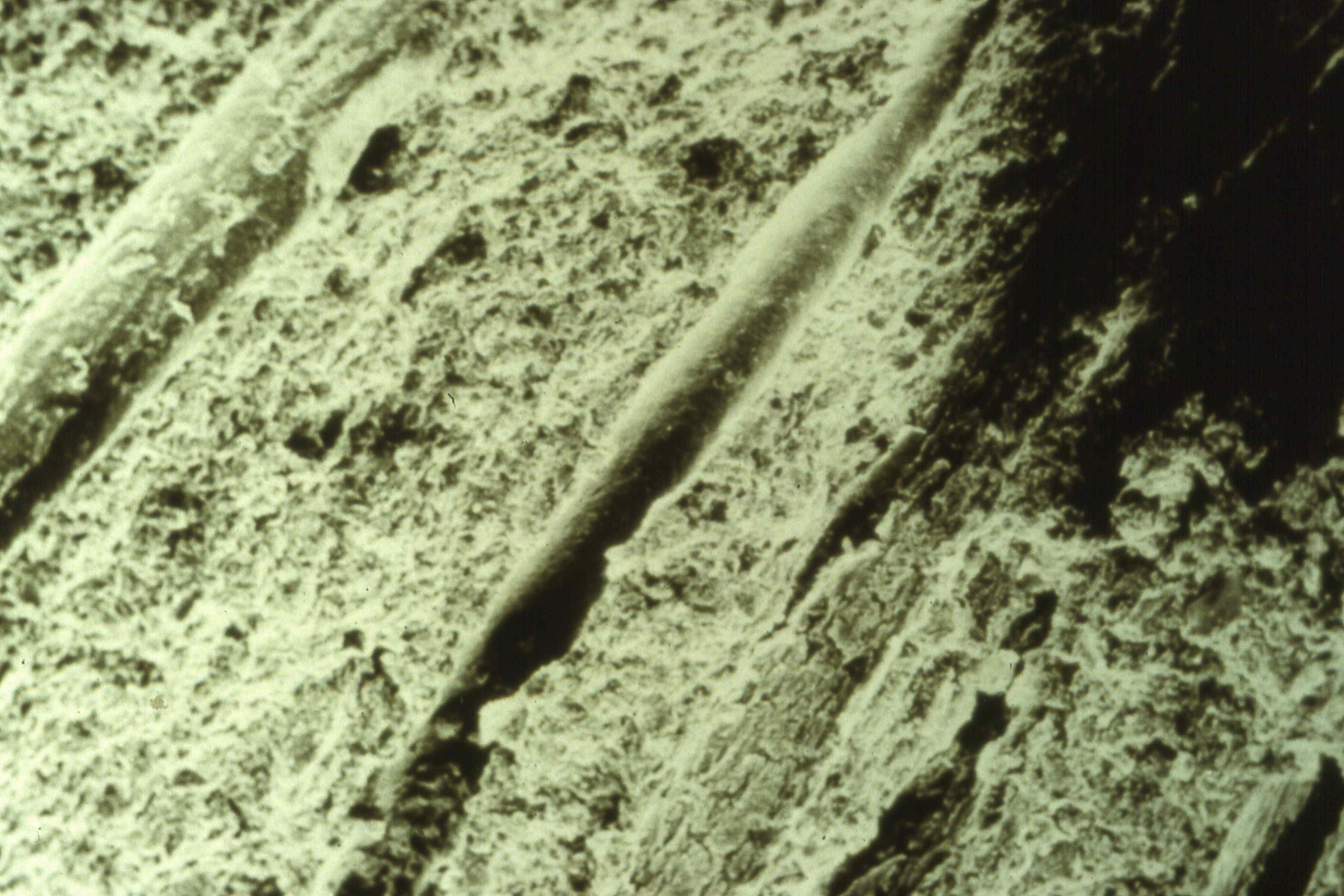
Traces of hair in the casting core material of Statue A.

In 1984 the ICR began chemical and physical analyses, together with monitoring of the environmental conditions around the statues to assess their state of preservation. Radiography and an endoscopic examination in 1985 showed severe corrosion where the remaining casting core material was in contact with the bronze walls. On 6 February 1986 a complete examination of the interior with a video endoscope established that casting core material was still present in the legs and, in part, in the torsos. During the 1992–1995 restoration, 56 kg of casting core material was removed from Statue B and 72 kg from Statue A.

During the 1992–1995 restoration, material remaining inside the statues was removed layer by layer with articulated instruments and microcameras; this "micro-excavation" revealed the construction of the inner cores and allowed much of their form and working sequence to be reconstructed in three dimensions. From the 1970s through the 1990s several studies held that the indirect method, in which wax is obtained from a mould made from a model, was already widely used in the 5th century BC, but physical evidence from workshops producing large statues was lacking. During the first emptying operation, the belief that the casting core material had been poured in liquid or semi-liquid form led to its layered arrangement not being recorded.

The later micro-excavation revealed cores built up in concentric or parallel layers; Micheli and Vidale proposed that both statues had been modelled by the direct method, with the core freely built around iron pins, rather than by filling a hollow wax mould as in the indirect method. In 1999 Micheli and Vidale stressed that the direct-method interpretation remained a hypothesis to be tested on other statues of the same period. The operations, carried out with Giuseppe Sgrò and Irene Spuri, lasted about two years and produced about 80 cross-sections at average intervals of 5 cm and about 80 hours of video recording. To counter corrosion, the internal surfaces were treated with slender tools inserted into the cavities and controlled by microcameras. The second restoration ended in July 1995. At its conclusion, the previous system attaching the statues to their bases was replaced by a new support and anti-seismic base system that had undergone simulation tests.

=== 2009–2013 intervention ===
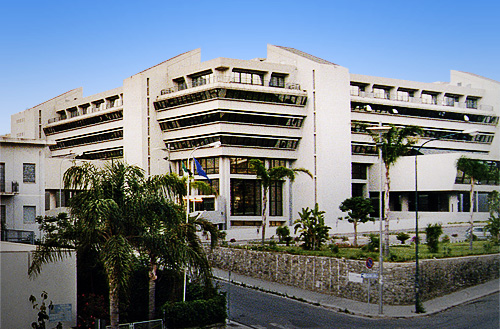
Palazzo Campanella, where the laboratory for the 2009–2013 intervention was installed.

The 2009–2013 conservation intervention was carried out at Palazzo Campanella, seat of the Regional Council of Calabria, with the participation of restorers from the ICR and the Archaeological Superintendency of Calabria. In August 2010 the laboratory installed in the Salone Monteleone of Palazzo Campanella was directed by Pasquale Dapoto of the Superintendency and placed under the responsibility of Roberto Ciabattoni and Paola Donati of the Istituto Superiore per la Conservazione e il Restauro. The schedule announced in August 2010 envisaged the statues' return to the museum by March 2011. Work instead continued until 2013; the statues returned to the museum on the night of 21 December. During the intervention, the removal of casting core material remaining inside the statues after earlier restorations was completed.

The analyses included chemical examinations and measurements of surface colour; gamma radiographs, images of the interior obtained with gamma rays, were also made and later repeated in selected areas. In 2010 an electronic system was installed to monitor remotely temperature, humidity and light inside and outside the statues and to trigger an automatic alarm if anomalous values were detected. Shaped supports, or counterforms, made of carbon fiber and Kevlar were produced for supporting and moving the statues; their shapes were derived from full-size resin prototypes produced by three-dimensional laser scanning.

In the 2013 reinstallation the statues were placed on new anti-seismic bases of Carrara marble designed by ENEA. Anti-seismic bases of this type were used for the first time with the Riace bronzes. The base was designed to permit large horizontal displacements with little energy dissipation and to reduce the effects of both horizontal and vertical seismic motion. The design called for materials compatible with the display and simple maintenance. The device consists of two superimposed load-bearing blocks: balls between the blocks allow the base to slide horizontally; in the upper block pairs of cylinders and pistons reduce vertical oscillations, while damping systems dissipate oscillation energy. Before installation, ENEA tested the bases on shaking tables, using full-size copies of the statues.

=== Conservation and documentation ===
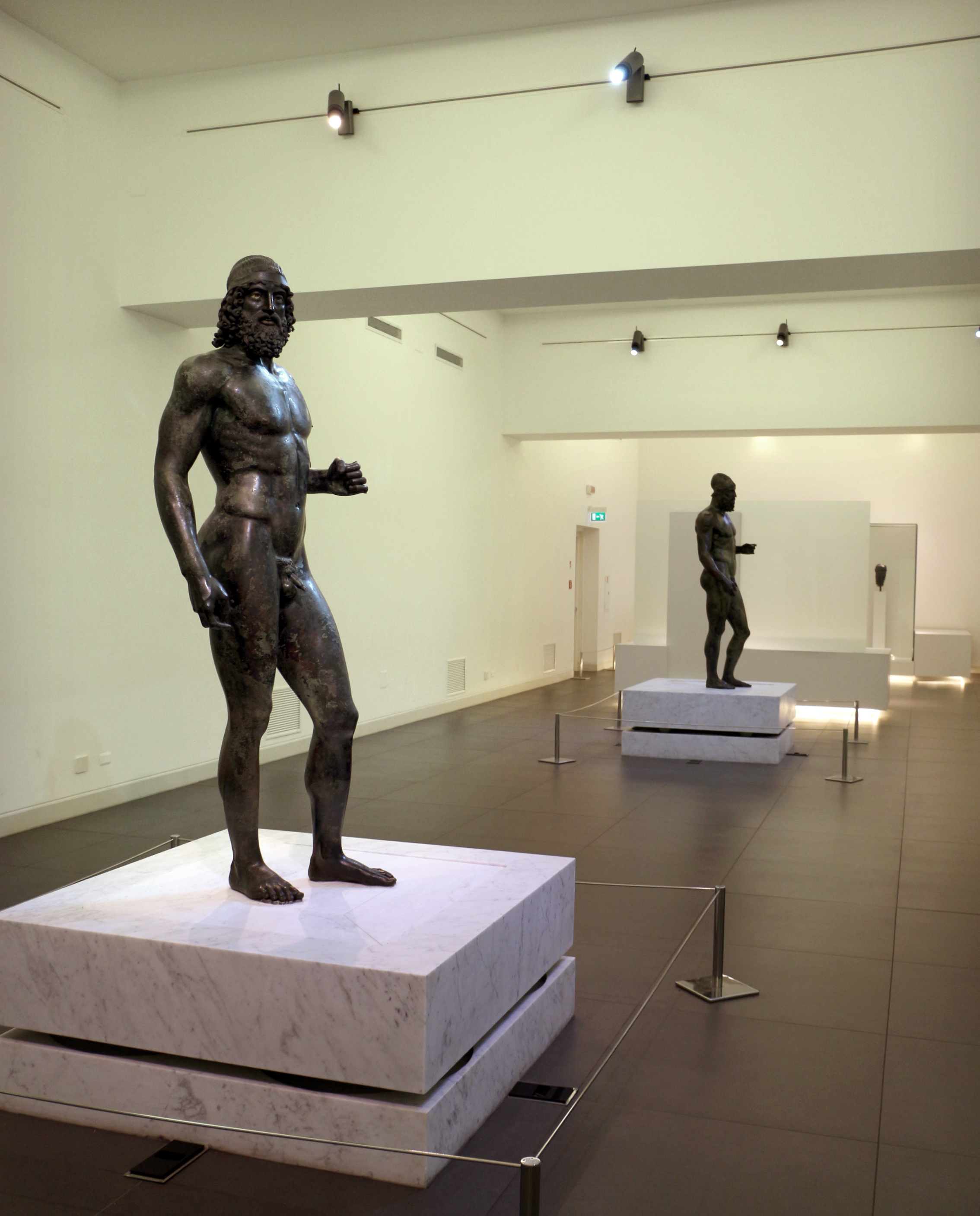
The Riace bronzes in their room at the Museo Nazionale della Magna Grecia.

The room housing the Riace bronzes was equipped with an air-control and filtration system to protect the statues from environmental fluctuations. When the room reopened in December 2013, access was organized in groups of twenty people, with about twenty minutes in the pre-filter room, about three minutes in the filter room and about twenty minutes to view the statues. In March 2023 the museum and the ICR agreed on a periodic monitoring programme for the Riace bronzes and the Porticello bronzes, begun in September 2023. In 2024 checks took place on 15–16 April, 27–30 May, 17–18 June, 1–2 July and 16–18 September; they included direct examination of the statues, instrumental tests, and graphic, photographic and very-high-resolution three-dimensional recording. On 7 January 2026 the National Archaeological Museum, Florence and the Museo Nazionale della Magna Grecia signed an agreement to catalogue and digitize the documentation held in Florence on the restoration and exhibition of the Riace bronzes and to make it available to both museums.

== Exhibitions and public initiatives ==
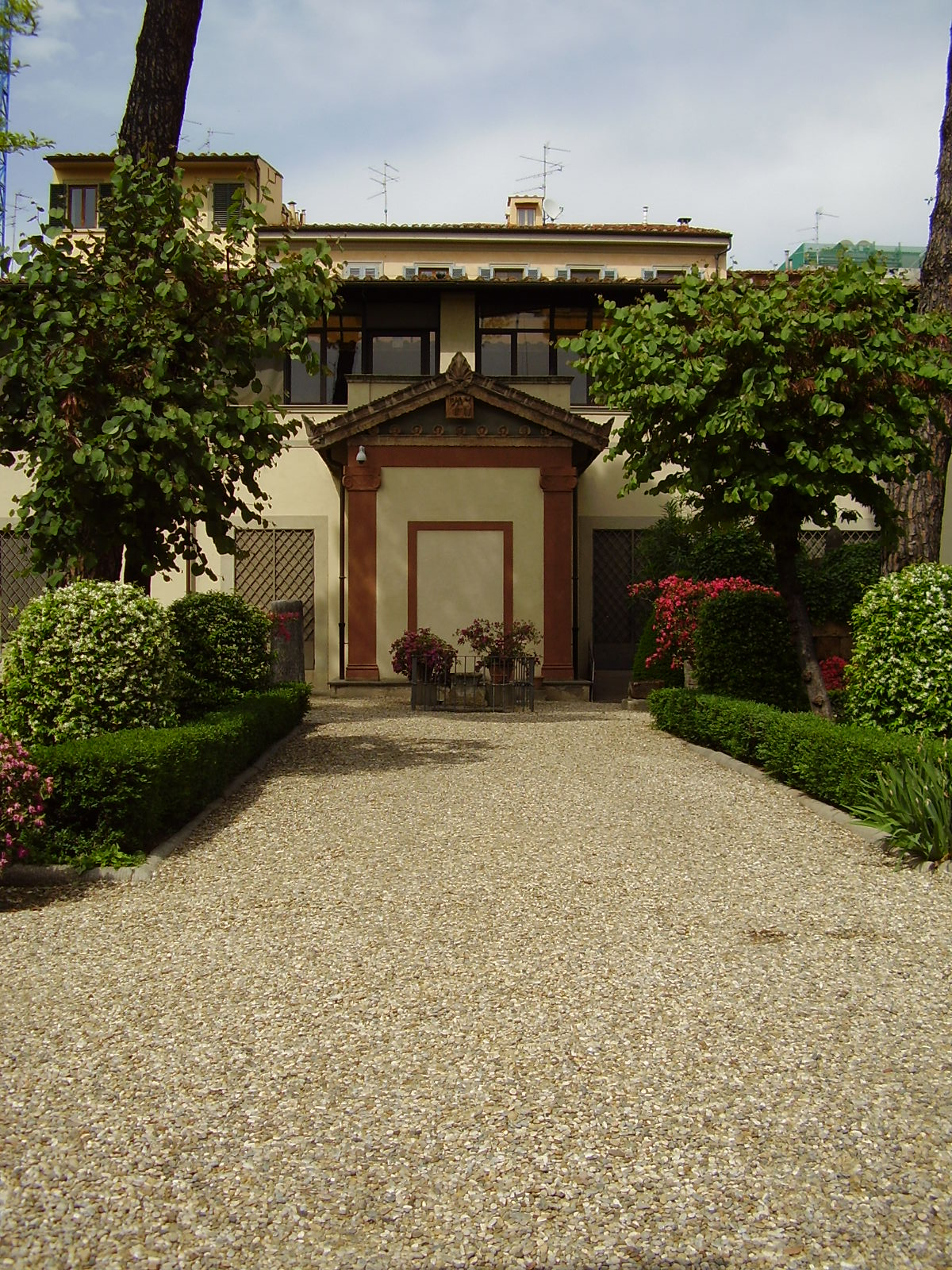
The National Archaeological Museum, Florence, venue of the first public display of the Riace bronzes after restoration.

On 15 December 1980, after the Florence restoration, the two statues were exhibited to the public for the first time at the National Archaeological Museum, Florence. The display, initially planned as temporary, was extended until 24 June 1981; it was followed by an exhibition at the Quirinal Palace, held from 29 June to 12 July 1981. The Florence exhibition received 250,000 visitors in its first month, while the Quirinal exhibition attracted 300,000 visitors in twelve days. During the intervention at Palazzo Campanella, the restoration laboratory was open to the public and received almost 80,000 visitors between 1 January and 31 July 2010. From 4 May to 4 September 2016 the Liebieghaus Skulpturensammlung in Frankfurt hosted the exhibition Athens: The Triumph of Imagery, in which the reconstruction of Statue A made in 2015 was presented for the first time together with a reconstructive cast of Statue B.

From 19 June 2019 to 27 September 2020 the Altes Museum in Berlin hosted the exhibition Starke Typen. Griechische Porträts der Antike; the reconstructive casts of Statues A and B from the Liebieghaus were placed in the museum's rotunda and remained on display until 12 January 2020. From 5 July 2022 to 26 March 2023 the Metropolitan Museum of Art in New York hosted Chroma: Ancient Sculpture in Color, organized in collaboration with the Liebieghaus Skulpturensammlung; both reconstructions of the Riace bronzes, made by Vinzenz Brinkmann and Ulrike Koch-Brinkmann in 2015–2016, were exhibited.

On 12 July 2022, for the fiftieth anniversary of the discovery, the Directorate-General of Museums, the Colosseum Archaeological Park and the Museo Nazionale della Magna Grecia organized a meeting in the Curia Julia in collaboration with the Metropolitan Museum of Art. A bronze reproduction of the head of Statue A, made by Vinzenz Brinkmann to illustrate a reconstruction of its original colour appearance, was shown during the meeting; a video produced by the Metropolitan Museum for an exhibition on the polychromy of ancient sculpture that had opened in New York on 5 July 2022 was shown with it. The reconstructed head and video remained on display in the Curia Julia until 18 July 2022. From 10 to 12 November 2022 the Museo Nazionale della Magna Grecia hosted an international conference for the fiftieth anniversary, with more than thirty scholars and researchers. The programme had four sections devoted to underwater archaeology, ancient art history, restoration, and presentation of the bronzes to the public; the first section also presented results from campaigns conducted in the discovery area through 29 October 2022.

On 12 December 2023 the Italian Ministry of Enterprises and Made in Italy issued an ordinary postage stamp in the series Il Patrimonio artistico e culturale italiano dedicated to the Riace bronzes. Its design reproduces the two statues and bears the inscription "Bronzi di Riace 50° anniversario scoperta"; 250,020 copies were printed in sheets of 45 stamps. The design was prepared by the production philatelic centre of the Istituto Poligrafico e Zecca dello Stato and printed by five-colour rotogravure. In 2026 the bronzes are displayed on level D of the Museo Nazionale della Magna Grecia, together with sections devoted to Reggio and underwater finds; the same floor also contains finds from the Porticello wreck, including the Basel Head and the Head of a Philosopher.

== Identification, dating and attribution ==
=== Hypotheses on dating, provenance and authorship ===
Since the late 1970s, different proposals have been advanced concerning the dating and provenance of the bronzes, their sculptors, the identity of the figures, the original monument, and their history before the discovery. A 5th-century BC date is predominant, but there is no agreement on the identity of the figures, their sculptors, or the monument for which they were made. Style is one of the criteria used for dating them: Statue A has the characteristics of the Severe style, while Statue B shows elements connected with the tradition of Polykleitos; A is generally placed around 460 BC and B around 430 BC. The resemblance of Statue B to works in the Polykleitan tradition does not imply an attribution to Polykleitos: Phidias, Myron, Alcamenes, Onatas, and Pythagoras of Rhegion, among others, have been proposed for one or both statues; the attributions include sculptors and schools from Attica, Aegina, the Peloponnese, and Magna Graecia.

Because most of the original attributes are lost, few elements remain for identifying the figures: the helmet and shield characterize at least Statue A as a warrior, but proposed identifications include mythological heroes, Athenian eponymous heroes, generals, victors in athletic contests, athletes, and deities. Delphi, Olympia, Athens, centres of Magna Graecia, and, in some hypotheses, Sicily have been proposed as their original location. The form and number of the surviving tenons beneath the feet, two on Statue A and four on Statue B, have been used to propose different dates and restorations, but the interpretations do not agree. Werner Fuchs, Antonio Giuliano and Maurizio Harari connected the bronzes with the Athenian dedication, the votive monument erected along the Sacred Way at Delphi after the victory at Marathon and attributed by the ancient sources to Phidias; Claude Rolley, however, observed that the statues reconstructed from bases associated with that dedication would have been smaller than the Riace bronzes. Analyses of the casting earth and other materials left inside the statues have been used to investigate their provenance, but by themselves cannot identify the sculptors or the original monument. An archaeometric study published in 2016 compared additional casting-core samples with geological material from Greece. It excluded the areas around Athens and Corinth among the sources examined, while leaving the Argolid as a possible source and identifying the Megarid as deserving further investigation; the precise origin of the clay remains uncertain. Underwater investigations in the discovery area have produced few finds and have not securely identified a ship's cargo; explanations proposed for the statues' presence on the seabed include loss in a shipwreck and jettisoning to lighten a vessel during a storm, while the route, date of the event, and the bronzes' earlier history remain unknown.

=== Hypotheses from 1979 to 1992 ===
In 1979, and again in 1981 and 1982, Werner Fuchs connected the two statues with the dedication erected by the Athenians at Delphi after the victory at the Battle of Marathon and attributed them to Phidias. Alberto Busignani adopted the same interpretation; Antonio Giuliano developed the attribution to Phidias and his workshop, while Maurizio Harari revived the connection with the Delphic dedication in 1988. In 1982 Carlo Odo Pavese proposed that the attribute held in the right hand should be a laurel or olive branch. Antonino Di Vita developed this suggestion together with evidence concerning the helmets and comparisons with Attic pottery, interpreting both statues in 1984 as victors in the armed race at Panhellenic or Panathenaic contests and at the same time as politically prominent Athenians. In 1983 Hans Peter Isler and in 1984 Paolo Enrico Arias identified the figures as Athenian heroes, connected Statue A with Phidias or his circle and Statue B with the Phidian school, and dated the works respectively to about 460–450 BC and roughly thirty years later. Arias also regarded both statues as works of an Attic milieu.

==== Rolley's hypothesis ====
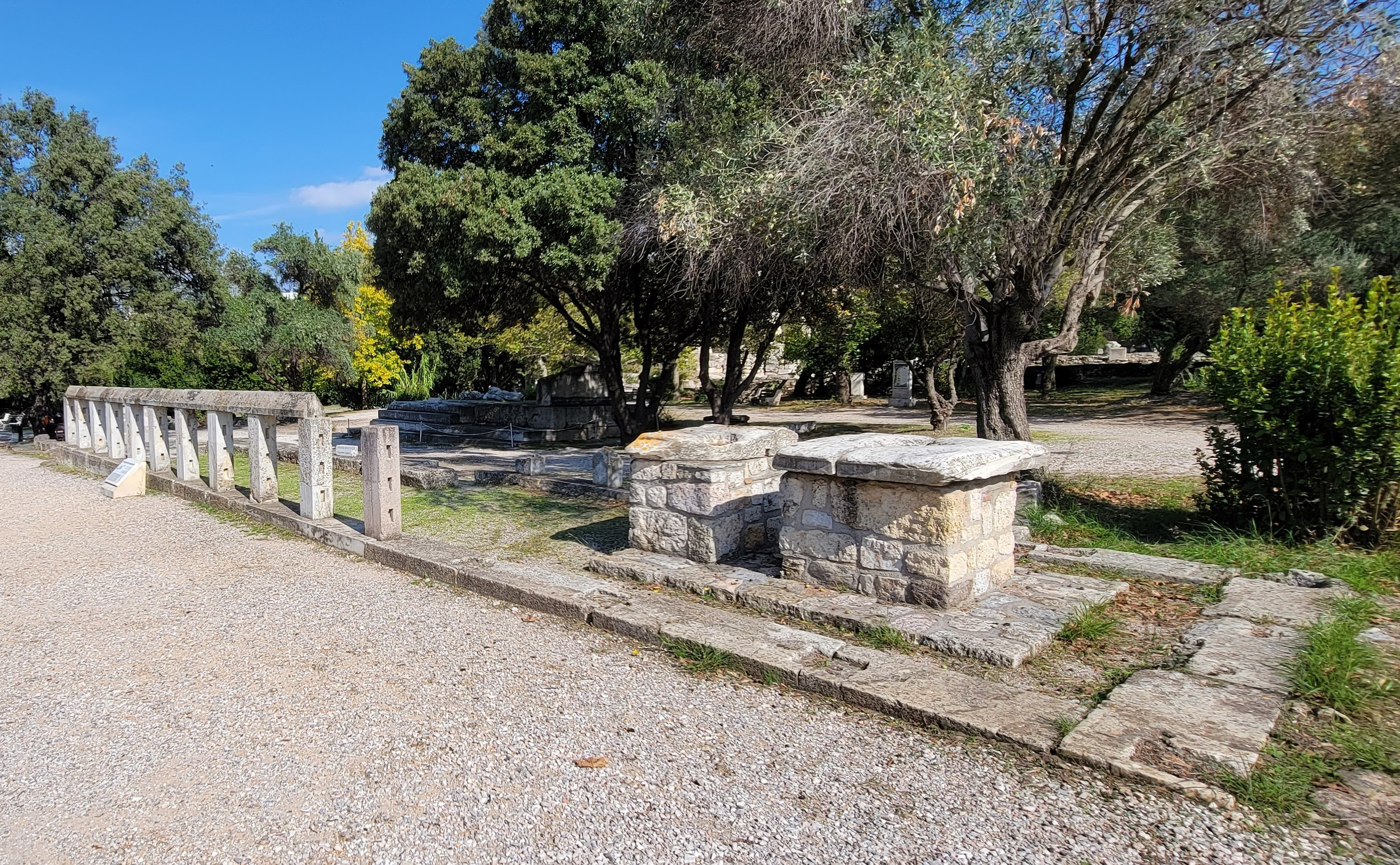
The remains of the Monument of the Eponymous Heroes, 350–300 BC, in the Athenian Agora.

In 1983 Claude Rolley proposed identifying Statue A as an Attic eponymous hero, one of the heroes who gave their names to the Athenian tribes, sculpted by an Athenian artist around 460 BC; Statue B would be a second Attic eponymous hero, attributable to the circle of Phidias and datable to about 430 BC. He repeated the proposal in 1984. Rolley reconstructed A's head without a helmet: the cut-down and peened pin might have supported protection against bird droppings, while the band at temple level would have been a diadem, understood as a sign of the hero's royalty. Castrizio disputes both interpretations: he considers it more likely that the pin intended to support a Corinthian helmet broke and was replaced by the stronger one preserved at the centre of the head; regarding the band, he notes that surface marks indicate almost complete coverage by the helmet and that the two hanging ends typical of diadems are absent, and therefore interprets it as padding placed between the head and the helmet.

==== Paribeni's hypothesis ====
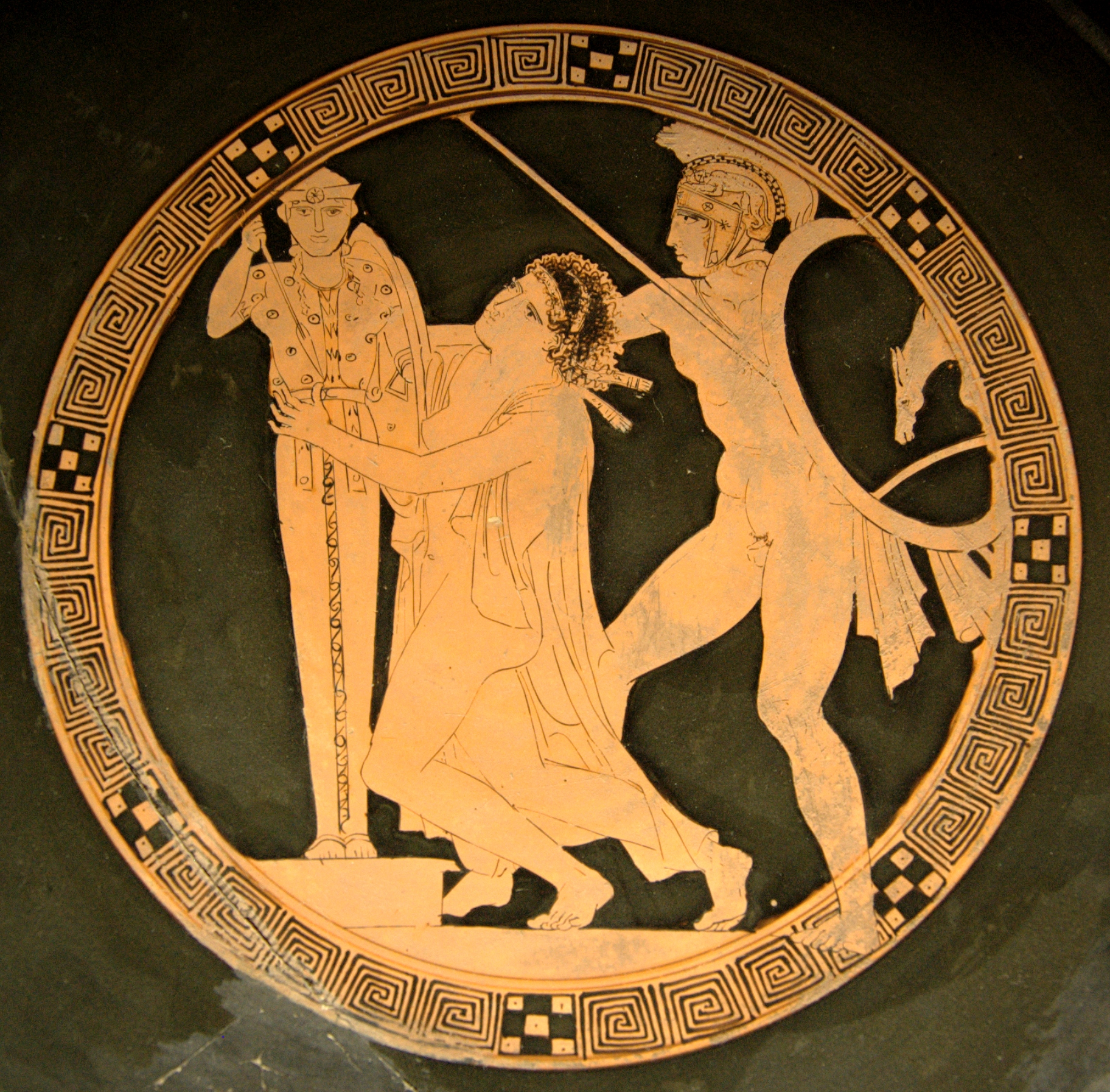
Ajax the Lesser and Cassandra on an Attic red-figure cup, c. 440 BC. Louvre, Paris.

Enrico Paribeni excluded an Attic origin for Statue A and turned his attention to the sculpture of Magna Graecia. He gave particular weight to the discovery site, in the Locrian area of southern Calabria, and rejected the hypothesis that the statues had been abandoned by a passing ship. He identified A as a hero, perhaps Ajax the Lesser, made by a Peloponnesian artist between 460 and 450 BC, and B as a strategos, made by an artist influenced by Attic sculpture between 410 and 400 BC. For Paribeni, A still belonged to the Severe style, whereas B belonged to mature Classicism. Castrizio objects that the identification of A with Ajax the Lesser rested mainly on the hero's role among the Ozolian Locrians of Greece, whom he described as the founders of Italian Locri; he also disputes the large chronological gap between the statues, arguing that it depended on comparison with the development of Athenian sculpture and was less suitable for explaining Peloponnesian, South Italian Greek and Siceliot works. Paribeni was more cautious about Statue B and proposed no precise identification, although the comparisons he selected could suggest a sword in the right hand; Castrizio, by contrast, regards the presence of lead in the cavity of the hand as evidence that the object held was a spear.

==== Di Vita's hypothesis ====
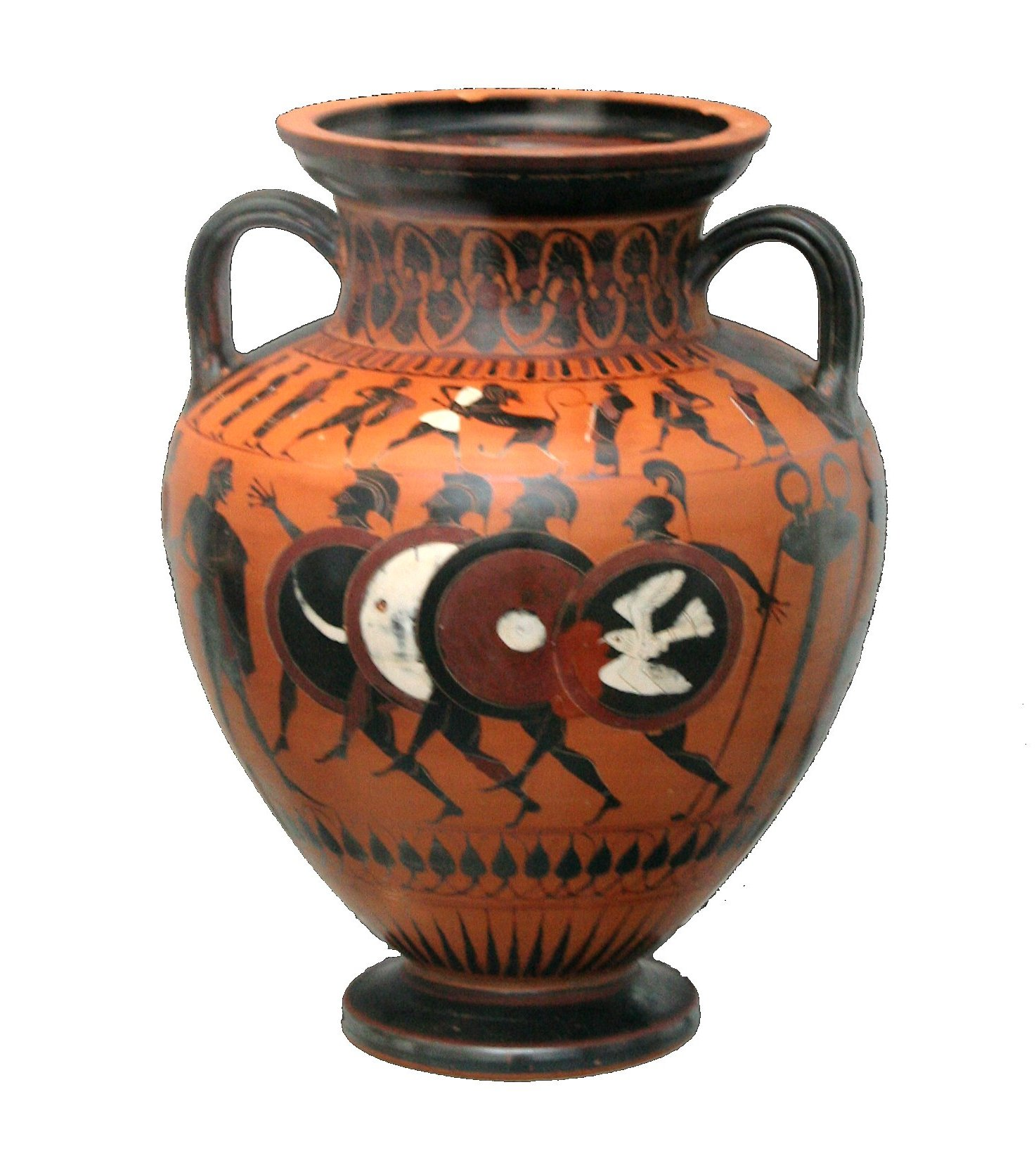
Attic black-figure neck-amphora showing a hoplitodromos, 550–540 BC. Staatliche Antikensammlungen, Munich.

The Italian archaeologist Antonino Di Vita proposed identifying the two bronzes as athletes victorious in the hoplitodromos, the armed race, and also interpreted them as politically prominent Athenians. He dated Statue A to about 460 BC and Statue B to about 430 BC, while leaving open the possibility that A was by Myron. Di Vita also reconstructed the lost attributes, placing olive or laurel branches in their right hands and a Chalcidian helmet on the head of Statue A. Castrizio objects that the statues' hands were designed to hold spears rather than branches, thereby removing one of the main arguments for identifying them as athletes; he also considers the reconstruction of a Chalcidian helmet, based on comparison with a hoplite statue from the Temple of Aphaia on Aegina now in Munich, incompatible with the traces on A's head, which he regards as corresponding to a Corinthian helmet.

==== Dontas's hypothesis ====
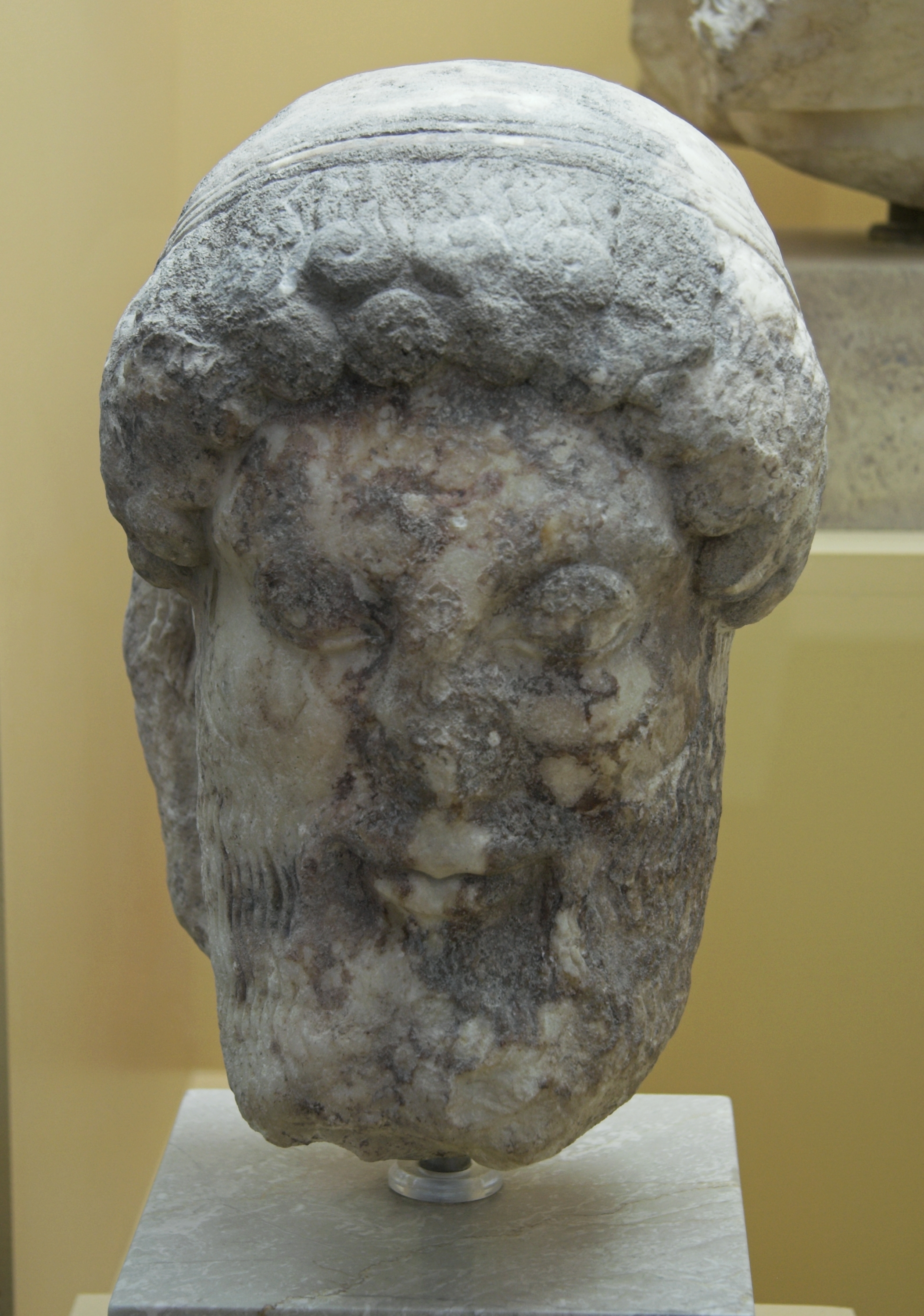
Marble herm head of the Alcamenoid type (S 2499), 2nd century AD. Museum of the Ancient Agora, Athens.

In 1984 the Greek archaeologist Georgios Dontas identified Statue A as an Athenian eponymous hero sculpted by Myron and placed in the Athenian Agora, while attributing Statue B, which would have represented another eponymous hero of the city, to the Attic sculptor Alcamenes; he dated both works to about 450 BC and returned to the proposal in 1988. Castrizio criticized Dontas's preference for an Attic, and specifically Athenian, origin as tied to the legacy of Neoclassicism and too inclined to exclude production in the Greek West. He considered the comparisons with Roman copies of Greek works remote from the bronzes, including a head of Zeus referred to a Myronian original and the head of the Hermes Propylaios derived from a work by Alcamenes; he regarded the arguments for an Athenian setting as insufficient and recalled that other identifications with major complexes in mainland Greece were also abandoned, such as the Achaean dedication at Olympia and the Athenian dedication at Delphi, for which an attribution to Phidias had even been proposed in the late 1980s.

==== Harrison, Bol and Deubner's hypothesis ====
Plan of the sanctuary at Olympia. The Achaean dedication is marked no. 17 in the centre.

In 1985 Evelyn B. Harrison, in 1986 Peter Cornelis Bol, and in 1988 Otfried Deubner connected the bronzes with the dedication of the Achaeans at Olympia, attributed by Pausanias to Onatas of Aegina; they regarded both statues as works by Onatas datable to 470–460 BC. The group described by Pausanias represented Nestor surrounded by nine Greek heroes as he drew lots to determine who would face Hector. Deubner identified Statue A as Agamemnon and Statue B as Ajax.

==== Stucchi's hypothesis ====
Sandro Stucchi identified both statues as Euthymos of Locri Epizefiri, represented in Statue A while still alive and in Statue B after death. Statue A would represent Euthymos as victor at Temesa and would be a work by Pythagoras of Rhegion, made shortly after 470 BC; Statue B would show the same Euthymos heroized after death and would be the work of an artist from Magna Graecia, made shortly before 425 BC. In 2017 Scalco and Salvadori instead reported dates of 460 BC for A and 430 BC for B, assigning both statues to the Calabrian area and identifying B as the deified Euthymos. In the tradition concerning Euthymos, the boxer was said to have defeated the supernatural being that terrorized the inhabitants of Temesa and to have won Olympic victories in boxing. Stucchi was the first to interpret the two statues as representations of the same figure; he associated Statue B with a cap visible under the Corinthian helmet and interpreted it as a boxer's attribute. The cap shown in boxer iconography, however, has two long side flaps and lacks the neck protection recognizable on Statue B; this difference has been used to challenge the identification of the headgear as boxing protection. Stucchi connected the bronzes' presence in the sea at Riace with the history of Pyrrhus, proposing that the statues had been looted at Locri Epizefiri in 275 BC and lost shortly after embarkation during the voyage towards Epirus.

==== Holloway's hypothesis ====
In 1988 the American archaeologist R. Ross Holloway proposed identifying the bronzes as a pair of oikists, founders of a Greek city in Sicily; in 2000 he dated both statues to shortly before 450 BC, regarding them as contemporaneous works made for the same monument. In support of the same date he cited similarities in the treatment of the hair, moustaches and various anatomical details; differences visible from the front would instead be intentional variations rather than signs of different dates or makers. As for identity, he associated the figures with pairs of founders of Akragas, Aristonous and Pystilus; of Gela, Antiphemus and Entimus; and, for Kamarina, Dascon and Menecolus, while excluding Syracuse. To explain the statues' presence at sea, he imagined that the Carthaginians had taken them as booty after the sack of Akragas, Gela or Kamarina during the campaign of 406–405 BC; loaded onto a Carthaginian ship, they would then have been lost when the vessel was wrecked off Sicily.

==== Ridgway's hypothesis ====
Brunilde Sismondo Ridgway proposed a Roman date for the bronzes in 1981 and reiterated it in 1984, interpreting both statues as mythical heroes and regarding them as Roman-period works inspired by Classical Greek sculpture, datable between the 1st century BC and the Hadrianic period. The two figures would be warriors belonging to an epic poem, and Statue B would have been made about twenty years after Statue A. The proposal of a Roman date remained isolated compared with the predominant placement of the bronzes in the 5th century BC. Castrizio criticized the Roman dating, arguing that it arose primarily from the difficulty of recognizing Attic characteristics in the two statues and observing that the very thin bronze walls would be incompatible with Roman manufacture; he also noted that the proposal was not adopted by other scholars.

=== Hypotheses since 1998 ===
==== Moreno's hypothesis ====
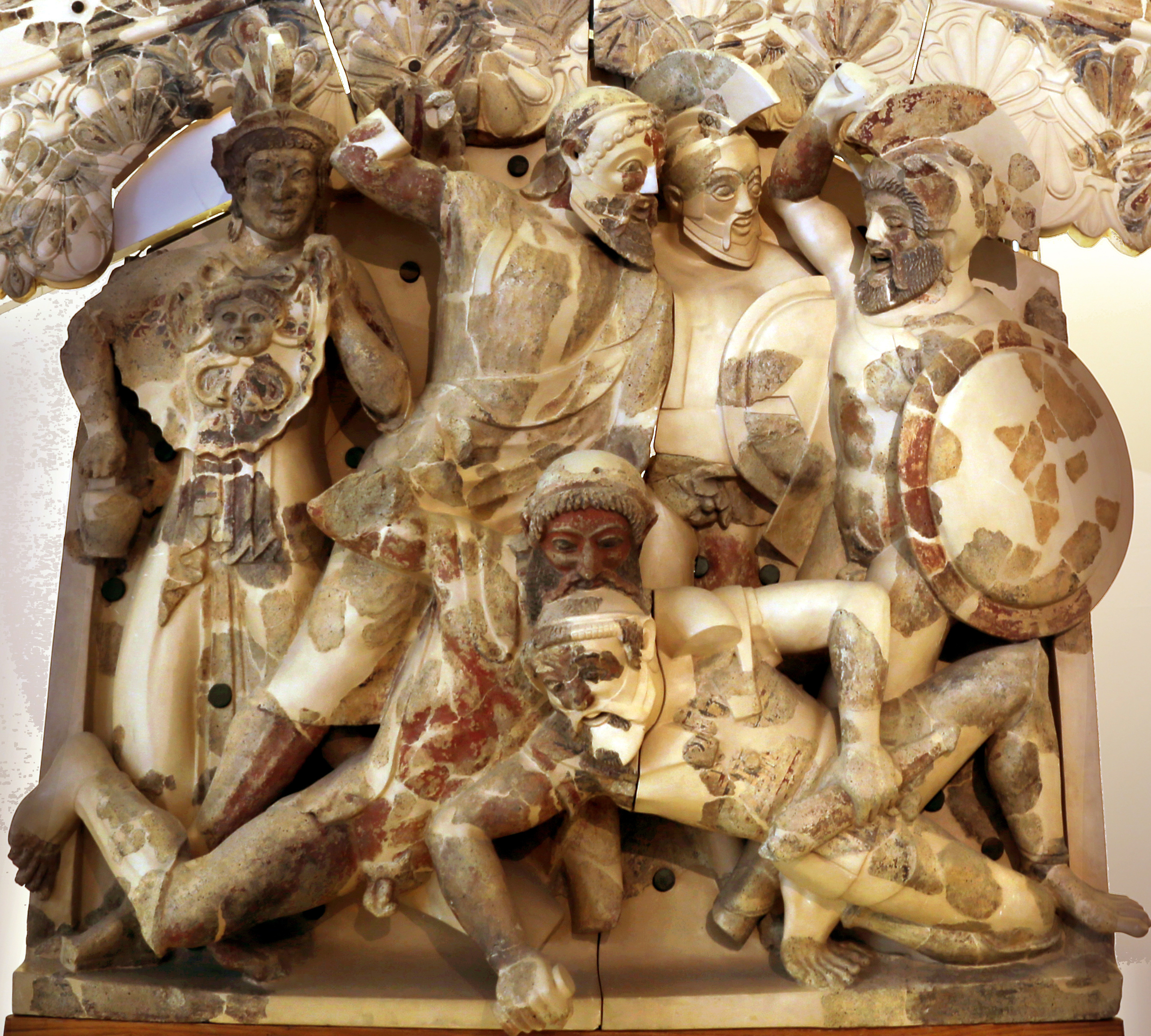
Tydeus and Melanippus (below) in the high relief from Temple A at Pyrgi, 470–460 BC, cited by Moreno in comparison with the bronzes. National Etruscan Museum of Villa Giulia, Rome.

In 1998 Paolo Moreno proposed identifying Statue A as Tydeus and Statue B as Amphiaraus, two protagonists of the Seven against Thebes, and connected both to a statuary group from Argos; in a later study he reaffirmed the identifications, attributing Tydeus to Ageladas II and Amphiaraus to Alcamenes I. Moreno excluded an athlete identification for Statue A because of the figure's hostile attitude; in Statue B he considered the facial expression too intense for a historical portrait, interpreting both as mythological figures belonging to the same statuary group. Moreno used technical data from the restoration to argue that the two statues belonged to the same group; from the casting earth he derived a hypothesis of production at Argos for A and, more cautiously, at Argos or in Attica for B.

- Statue A would represent Tydeus, a hero of the Theban Cycle, associated with Calydon, father of Diomedes and protected by Athena. An iconographic comparison used for this identification is the high relief from Temple A at Pyrgi, dated to 470–460 BC, in which Tydeus bites Melanippus's skull with his teeth clearly visible, as in Statue A.
- Statue B would represent Amphiaraus, king of Argos and a seer, who foresaw the disastrous outcome of the expedition of the Seven against Thebes and knew that he would die there.

Tydeus and Amphiaraus took part in the expedition of the Seven against Thebes, which ended in defeat for the Argive army. In Moreno's proposal the two statues are dated respectively to about 450 BC and 440 BC.

Identification of the artists

Moreno attributed Statue A to Ageladas the Younger, an Argive sculptor, and Statue B to Alcamenes the Elder, originally from Lemnos but professionally trained in Athens. The attribution of Statue B to Alcamenes revived a name already proposed by Georgios Dontas in 1988. Since some ancient sources call Alcamenes Athenian and others Lemnian, it has also been conjectured that he was born on Lemnos and later received Athenian citizenship as a reward for his artistic merit.

Ageladas is remembered as an Argive sculptor and as the maker, at Delphi, of a group of Messapian women and horses dedicated by the Tarentines; because the works attributed to him by the sources span the period from 520 to 450 BC, some scholars have hypothesized two sculptors of the same name. Moreno connected the two sculptors with the Temple of Zeus at Olympia, attributing to them the entire sculptural programme of the two pediments and the metopes, completed in 457 BC. In 2014 the casting earths had been interpreted as certainly Argive for Statue A and very probably Athenian for Statue B.

Literary sources

Pausanias published the ten books of his description of Greece between AD 160 and 177. In the passage devoted to Argos he describes statues of Polynices and the leaders who died fighting before the walls of Thebes, and beside them statues of the men who later captured the city. Moreno identified this complex with the monument of the Seven and the Epigoni mentioned in the agora of Argos and dated it to the years immediately after 456 BC. The complex would have consisted of about fifteen statues. Pausanias does not connect the statues he describes at Argos with the Riace bronzes: the identification of Tydeus and Amphiaraus with the two statues found at Riace belongs to Moreno's proposal of 1998. In 2014 Guerrini observed that identifying them with the group seen by Pausanias would imply transport of the statues to Italy after the Hadrianic period, when the movement of ancient works of art from Greece to Italy had already greatly declined.

==== Castrizio's hypothesis ====
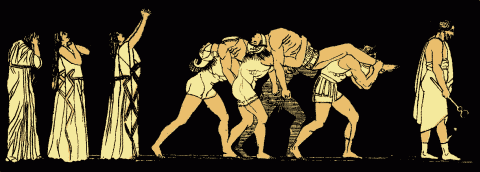
Eteocles and Polynices

In 2000 Daniele Castrizio connected the bronzes with a statuary group from Argos and identified them as Eteocles and Polynices, assigning Statue A to Eteocles and Statue B to Polynices. In 2019 he reversed the identification, recognizing Polynices in Statue A and Eteocles in B, and attributed the group to Pythagoras of Rhegion; he maintained these proposals in his 2025 study.

Attributes and group membership

For Castrizio, both statues represent heroized warriors, nude according to the convention of heroic nudity and armed with Corinthian helmets, hoplite shields and spears. He also interprets similarities in proportions and pose as evidence that they belonged to the same complex; in 2025 he proposed that they were produced in the same workshop, while allowing for the intervention of two sculptors and separate groups of assistants.

Heads, shields and weapons

Castrizio interprets the band around Statue A's head as textile padding worn beneath a Corinthian helmet. He connects the pin at the crown of the head and other marks on the head with fastening the helmet. On Statue B, he interprets the shape of the skullcap, the copper inserts, the holes near the ears and the recess in the beard as traces of a leather cap worn beneath the helmet, identified as a korinthie kynê. He also assigns this headgear a role as a distinctive sign of military and political command.

Castrizio interprets the traces on the arms and hands as evidence of large hoplite shields and spears. In Statue A the shaft would have been held between the thumb, index and middle fingers, whereas B would have held it in the palm.

Literary sources and identification

For the identification with Eteocles and Polynices, Castrizio invokes a tradition of the Theban myth preserved in the so-called Lille Papyrus, a fragment of a poem attributed to Stesichorus and conventionally called the Thebaid, in which the brothers' mother tries to avert their conflict by proposing a division of the inheritance. He also compares the bronzes with Roman representations of the brothers' conflict, especially the Attic sarcophagus at Villa Doria Pamphili, in which he recognizes a composition derived from the same subject. In support of the attribution to Pythagoras he also cites a passage of Tatian that mentions Polynices and Eteocles together with the sculptor; Claudia Guerrini has, however, observed that no other ancient source mentions this work and that Tatian does not give its location.

Provenance and transfers

Castrizio interprets the analyses of the casting earth as indicating a common provenance from Argos; Guerrini had instead regarded the earth from Statue A as certainly Argive and that from B as very probably Athenian. In 2025 he also reported that Konstantinos Tziampasis had identified in the agora of Argos a base with impressions compatible with the feet of Statue A and the support for its spear, and associated with the same group a bronze statue found at Argos in 1992 that might represent Tiresias.

Castrizio also identifies as an ancient copy of Statue A a small bronze statue found in the Tiber in 1906 and held by the Wadsworth Atheneum Museum of Art, interpreting it as evidence that the original was in Rome in the imperial period. He has proposed that a fragment of an Agora M 273 amphora, lodged between the right wrist and flank of Statue A and dated to the first half of the 4th century AD, may be connected with a later sea transport of the bronzes from Rome to Constantinople and that the ship was wrecked near Riace during the voyage.

==== Brinkmann and Koch-Brinkmann's hypothesis ====
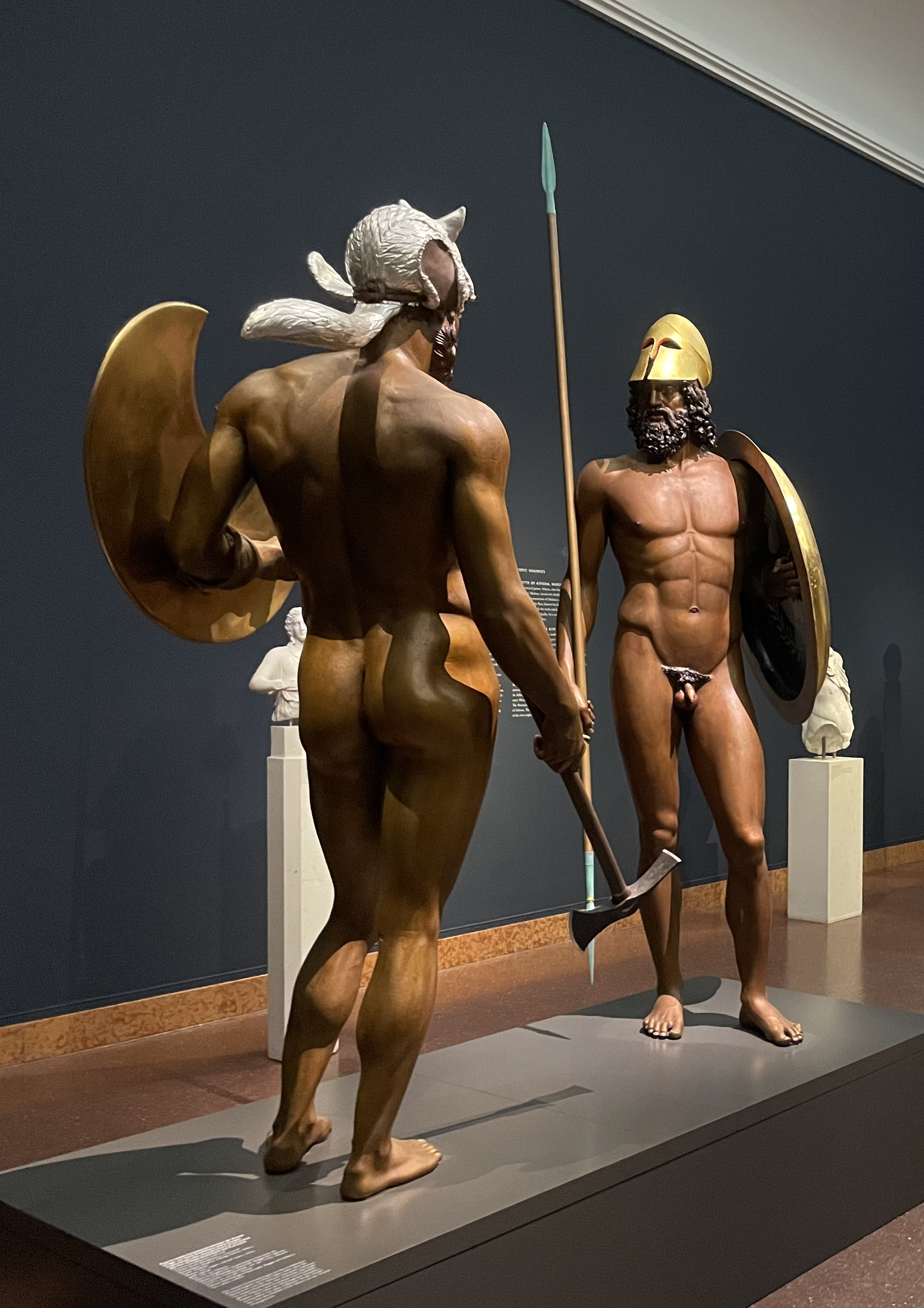
Experimental reconstruction of the bronzes as Erechtheus and Eumolpos by the Liebieghaus Polychromy Research Project.

In 2016 Vinzenz Brinkmann and Ulrike Koch-Brinkmann identified Statue A as Erechtheus and Statue B as Eumolpus, opponents in the war between Athens and Eleusis, and proposed a provenance from the Acropolis of Athens. To test their reconstruction, Brinkmann and Koch-Brinkmann made two experimental replicas: they worked on A from 2012 to 2015 and on B from 2014 to 2016, beginning with high-precision three-dimensional surveys obtained with structured light. From the surveys, Voxeljet produced forms in polymethyl methacrylate impregnated with paraffin wax, from which the Strassacker foundry made the bronze casts, which were then chased and artificially patinated. After casting, goldsmith's work, stone cutting, colouring with asphalt varnish and pigments, gilding, and silvering were carried out. The two reconstructions, completed in 2015 and 2016 respectively and about 209 cm high, were made with bronze, silver, copper, gold, coloured stones, asphalt varnish, and pigments.

For Statue A, the form of the hair and the band on the head was interpreted as evidence for a Corinthian helmet resting on the head without being fully worn, while the position of the left arm and right hand led to a reconstruction with a round shield and spear. For Statue B, Brinkmann and Koch-Brinkmann instead reconstructed an alopekis, a fox-skin cap associated in Greek iconography with the Thracians, on the basis of the bronze sheet welded to the nape, the conical and unfinished shape of the upper skull, and the punched copper sheets preserved on the forehead and behind the right ear, interpreted as parts of the fastening and finishing system. For the same statue they reconstructed a light pelta shield and a short-handled weapon interpreted as a battle axe. In 2018 Brinkmann and Koch-Brinkmann further proposed that the left hand did not grip the shield's antilabe but held a bow and arrow, the latter retained in front of the fist by the slightly projecting and bent index finger. In 2022 reconstructions of the fox-skin cap, light shield, bow and arrow were added to the replica of Statue B, originally completed in 2016.

Brinkmann and Koch-Brinkmann interpret Statue B as a Thracian hero because in their reconstruction it wears an alopekis and weapons that they associate with the Thracians; comparison with a Greek opponent armed with a Corinthian helmet led them to identify B as Eumolpus, son of Poseidon and adversary of the Athenian king Erechtheus. Pausanias, at 1.27.4, describes near the temple of Athena on the Acropolis large bronze figures of men facing one another in combat, called Erechtheus and Eumolpus, while specifying that the opponent killed by Erechtheus was Immaradus, son of Eumolpus. Brinkmann and Koch-Brinkmann proposed that the Riace bronzes were the originals of the group seen by Pausanias.

In the experimental reconstruction, Statue B was reconstructed with light skin, reddish hair and blue-green eyes on the basis of literary descriptions of Thracians. Since none of these three colours survives on the statue, the choice derives from written sources; the patina and colouring of the replicas are also hypothetical. To obtain the skin colour of B experimentally, the Strassacker founders first treated fresh bronze with liver of sulfur (potassium sulfide) and copper nitrate to produce a light-brown base tone, then applied several layers of a diluted solution of asphalt varnish, linseed oil and indigo. The hair and beard instead received a reddish patina using potassium permanganate and were subsequently coated several times with a diluted solution of asphalt varnish, linseed oil and madder. In the experiment, the mixture of asphalt varnish, linseed oil and pigment was also used as a colourant, with its dilution varied to control transparency and luminosity.

=== Summary tables ===
Proposals from 1979 to 1988

Scholar and year	Proposed provenance or location	Figure A	Figure B	Attribution A	Attribution B	Dating
Werner Fuchs (1979; 1981–1982)	Delphi, Athenian dedication	hero	hero	Phidias	Phidias	c. 450 BC
Brunilde Sismondo Ridgway (1981; 1984)	Roman period	mythological hero; warrior in an epic poem	mythological hero; warrior in an epic poem	Roman production inspired by Classical Greek sculpture	Roman production inspired by Classical Greek sculpture	1st century BC to Hadrianic period; B about twenty years later than A
Antonino Di Vita (1984)	Attica	hoplitodromos athlete	hoplitodromos athlete	Attic artist, perhaps Myron	Attic artist, with post-Polykleitan elements	A: 460 BC; B: 430 BC
Claude Rolley (1983; 1984)	Attica	Attic eponymous hero	Attic eponymous hero	Attic artist before Phidias	artist in the tradition after Phidias	A: 460 BC; B: 430 BC
Enrico Paribeni (1984)	Magna Graecia	hero, perhaps Ajax the Lesser	strategos	Peloponnesian artist	Attic artist or one influenced by Attic sculpture	A: 460–450 BC; B: 410–400 BC
Evelyn B. Harrison (1985); Peter Cornelis Bol (1986)	Olympia, Achaean dedication	figure from the Achaean dedication	figure from the Achaean dedication	Onatas of Aegina	Onatas of Aegina	470–460 BC
Sandro Stucchi (1986; 1988)	Calabrian area	Euthymos of Locri	deified Euthymos of Locri	Pythagoras of Rhegion?	artist from Magna Graecia	A: shortly after 470 BC; B: shortly before 425 BC
Georgios Dontas (1984; 1988)	Athenian Agora	Athenian eponymous hero	Athenian eponymous hero	Myron	Alcamenes	c. 450 BC for both
Otfried Deubner (1988)	Olympia	Agamemnon	Ajax	Onatas of Aegina	Onatas of Aegina	470–460 BC
R. Ross Holloway (1988; revisited in 2000)	Sicily or Magna Graecia	oikist	oikist	Siceliot bronze worker	Siceliot bronze worker	shortly before 450 BC

Proposals from 1998 to 2025

Scholar and year	Proposed provenance or location	Figure A	Figure B	Attribution A	Attribution B	Dating
Paolo Moreno (1998)	Argos	Tydeus	Amphiaraus	Ageladas	Alcamenes	A: 450 BC; B: 440 BC
Daniele Castrizio (2000)	Argos	Eteocles	Polynices	not specified in the 2017 review	not specified in the 2017 review	mid-5th century BC
Nik Spatari	Calabria; A: Veii; B: Kaulon	warrior commemorating a victory of Locri	warrior commemorating a victory of Locri	Veii foundry; possible comparison with Vulca	Kaulon foundry, with local workers and Persian craftsmen	one statue at the time of the Battle of the Sagra, which Spatari dates to around 540 BC, the other about a century later; the source does not specify the association with A and B
Vinzenz Brinkmann and Ulrike Koch-Brinkmann (2016)	Acropolis of Athens	Erechtheus	Eumolpus	not specified	not specified	460–440 BC for both
Daniele Castrizio (2019; 2025)	Argos	Polynices	Eteocles	Pythagoras of Rhegion	Pythagoras of Rhegion	second half of the 5th century BC

== See also ==
- Amphiaraus
- Ancient Greek sculpture
- Artemision Bronze
- Charioteer of Delphi
- Eteocles
- Harmodius and Aristogeiton (sculpture)
- Head of a Philosopher
- Lost-wax casting
- Museo Nazionale della Magna Grecia
- Myron
- Phidias
- Polynices
- Pythagoras (sculptor)
- Seven against Thebes
- Tydeus
