= Eucheirus =

Eucheirus (Greek: Εὐχείρου/Εὔχειρον/Εὔχειρος) was a brass-caster statuary. Teacher of Clearchus of Rhegium teacher to statuary Pythagorus. He was said to be a native of Corinth and studied there at the schools of the Spartans Syadras and Chartas.
