= Paolo Moreno =

Italian archeologist and art historian (1934–2021)

- Born: 30 October 1934; Udine, Kingdom of Italy
- Died: 5 March 2021 (aged 86); Rome, Italy
- Occupations: Archeologist; Art Historian

Paolo Moreno (30 October 1934 – 5 March 2021) was an Italian archeologist, art historian, and university professor.

== Biography ==
Born in Udine in 1934, Moreno graduated from the University of Bari. He then attended the Italian School of Archaeology at Athens and the Scuola Nazionale di Archeologia. During his academic career, he directed the Institute of Archeology at the University of Bari and became a lecturer on ancient art at Roma Tre University. He was an editor at Enciclopedia dell'arte antica classica e orientale, published by the Institute of the Italian Encyclopaedia. He wrote several hundred studies on ancient art.

Paolo Moreno undertook his classical studies at the Liceo Ginnasio Jacopo Stellini high school in his hometown, continuing them at the University of Bari where he received his Bachelor of Arts degree in 1958.

Subsequent training saw him in 1961 in Athens, a student of Doro Levi at the Italian School of Archaeology at Athens, and in Rome at the National School of Archaeology, where he obtained his postgraduate degree in 1964, a student of Giovanni Becatti and Ranuccio Bianchi Bandinelli.

He taught at the University of Bari, where he was director of the Institute of Archaeology, and at Sapienza University in Rome. From 1992 he held the chair of Ancient Greek art and Roma Tre University of Humanities at Roma Tre University, until his retirement in 2008.

He was editor of the Encyclopedia of Ancient Classical and Oriental Art, Rome (Treccani), and participated in similar international initiatives:Lexicon Iconographicum Mythologiae Classicae,Zurich,Düsseldorf (Artemis Verlag); The Dictionary of Art, London, New York (Macmillan); Künstlerlexikon der Antike,Munich(Klaus Gerhard Saur). He disseminated his findings on famous monuments of ancient art through articles in professional journals, reports at conferences, public lectures, meetings in schools, interviews for the media, and writings in popular periodicals.

Frequent cultural contacts with Greece: Moreno presented the new reconstruction of the Colossus of Rhodes in Rhodes, gave lectures in Thessaloniki and Athens, promoted the placement on the Cadmean acropolis of modern copies of the Riace Bronzes he recognized as two of the Seven Heroes of the expedition against Thebes; received recognition from Sicione for studies on Lysippos, a native of the city.

He became known for the results of his assiduous efforts in interpreting the originals of Greek art, such as the great bronzes that came from the sea and the paintings discovered in Macedonia, in relation to the copies of the Roman age, to assign them to the masters we know from inscriptions and literary tradition.

Its identifications and attributions aroused interest beyond the circle of specialists:Phidias and Praxiteles the Elder as the authors of the colossal bronze group of which the Dioscuri of the Quirinal are copies; Tyldus and Amphiaraus from the waters of Riace, forged by Agelada of Argos and Alcamenes of Lemno, authors also of the sculptures in the Temple of Zeus, Olympia; the identification of the Motya Charioteer with the Punic god Melqart because of traces of the bronze covering; the Dancing Satyr of Mazara del Vallo of Mazara del Vallo assigned to Praxiteles; the Getty Museum's Athlete as a bronze by Lysippus, along with the Herakles from Sulmona and the Boxer at Rest; the Battle of Gaugamela restored to Apelles through the Pompeian mosaic; the Aphrodite sung by Apollonius of Rhodes revealed in the Winged Victory of Brescia; the original head of the Eros of Alcamene at Thespie mounted in late antiquity on the Hellenistic body of the Spinarius; Lucius Aemilius Paulus in one of the underwater finds from Brindisi; the designation of Cleopatra Capitolina for the alleged Esquiline Venus;Caesarion, son of Cleopatra and Julius Caesar, traced to Crete in the bronze original, thanks to replicas found in Rome; the ivory head from Anguillara as a portrait in apotheosis of Antonia Minor; the second, colossal Farnese Hercules rediscovered in the Royal Palace of Caserta.

Paolo Moreno died in Rome on 5 March 2021 at the age of 86.

== Publications ==
- Vita e arte di Lisippo (1987)
- Pittura greca, Da Polignoto ad Apelle (1987)
- Lisippo. L'arte e la fortuna (1995)
- Apelle. La battaglia di Alessandro (2000)
- I Bronzi di Riace. Il Maestro di Olimpia e i Sette a Tebe (2002)
- Il genio differente, Alla scoperta della maniera antica (2002)
- I marmi antichi della Galleria Borghese, La collezione archeologica di Camillo e Francesco Borghese (2003)
- Alessandro Magno (2004)
- La bellezza classica, Guida al piacere dell'antico (2008)
