= Head of a Philosopher =

Greek sculpture fragment

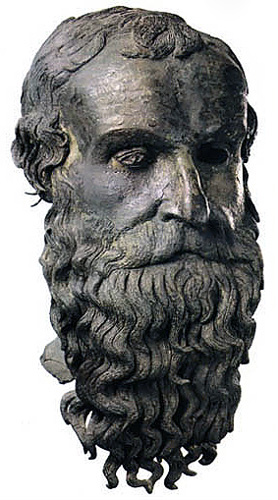
The Head of a Philosopher

The Head of a Philosopher is a fragment of a bronze sculpture of Magna Graecia, discovered in 1969 on a shipwreck in the Straits of Messina. It is now in the Museo Nazionale della Magna Grecia in Reggio Calabria, Italy.

The wreck dates to the end of the fifth century. The date of the Porticello bronze head is uncertain: Alain Pasquier dates it to c.460–440 BC, but Enrico Paribeni suggests the late fourth or early third century. In order to reconcile this later date with the late-fifth century context of the shipwreck, it has been suggested that there were in fact two wrecks, one earlier and one later. Brunilde Ridgway rejects this suggestion, noting that other bronze fragments found in the wreck, which apparently derive from the same original sculpture, are stylistically closer to the mid-fifth century BC.

The head, which has been recently restored, is believed to portray a philosopher, possibly the Epicurean philosopher Charondas, or a poet like Hesiod. It is partly damaged, lacking its laurel wreath, left eye and the hair on the back of its head. The mangled fragments of a hand and a cloak were found with it, which has led to the head's identification as a philosopher.

== Works cited ==
- Lawall, Mark L. (1998). "Bolsals, Mendean Amphoras, and the Date of the Porticello Shipwreck". International Journal of Nautical Archaeology. 27 (1): 16–23. Bibcode:1998IJNAr..27...16L. doi:10.1111/j.1095-9270.1998.tb00787.x.
- Ridgway, Brunhilde S. (2010). "The Porticello Bronzes Once Again". American Journal of Archaeology. 114 (2): 331–342. doi:10.3764/aja.114.2.331. Archived from the original on 2020-11-27.
