= Clearchus of Rhegium =

Clearchus or Clearch (Greek: Κλέαρχος Klearkhos) was a sculptor in bronze at Rhegium (modern Reggio Calabria) in Magna Graecia. He is notable as the teacher of the celebrated Pythagoras, who flourished at the time of Myron and Polykleitos. Clearchus was the pupil of the Corinthian Eucheirus (although was often said to have been apprenticed to the mythical Daedalus), and belongs probably to the 72nd and following Olympiads. His only recorded work is a bronze of Zeus that stood at Sparta, that was not cast, but made from plates of metal hammered into the desired form and then riveted together. The whole pedigree of the school to which he is to be ascribed is given by Pausanias.
