= Palazzo Campanella =

Coordinates: 38.1167°N 15.6592°E

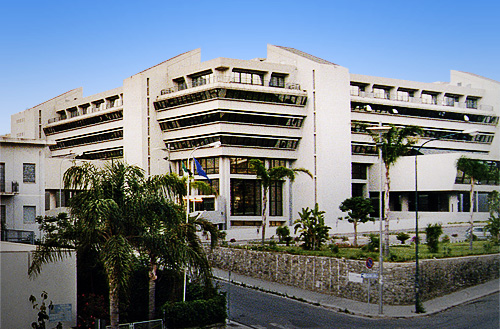
Palazzo Campanella

Palazzo Tommaso Campanella, mostly called Palazzo Campanella, is a major building in Reggio Calabria, Italy, as it is the seat of the Regional Council of Calabria (Consiglio Regionale della Calabria).

== Overview ==
Dedicated to the Calabrian philosopher Tommaso Campanella, this building is located in the street called Cardinale Portanova.
