= Pythagoras (sculptor) =

Ancient Greek sculptor of Samos/Rhegion

Pythagoras of Samos or Pythagoras of Rhegion (Ancient Greek: Πυθαγόρας, fl. 5th century BC) was an Ancient Greek sculptor from Samos. Pliny the Elder describes two different sculptors who bore a remarkable personal likeness to each other. In the nineteenth century Dictionary of Greek and Roman Biography and Mythology, Philip Smith accepted the opinion of Karl Julius Sillig (1801–1855) that Pliny's date of Olympiad 87 (c. 428 BC) ought to be referred to a Pythagoras of Samos but not a Pythagoras of Rhegium; other writers considered it possible Pythagoras of Samos lived closer to the beginning of the 5th century BC. Modern writers consider it certain these two were the same artist, and that this Pythagoras was one of the Samian exiles who moved to Zankle at the beginning of the 5th century BC and came under the power of the tyrant Anaxilas in Rhegium. While a Samian by birth, he was a pupil of Clearchus of Rhegium.

Pythagoras was at first a painter, but eventually turned to sculpture, apparently focusing on portraits of athletic champions from Hellenic cities of Magna Graecia in the Italian Peninsula and Sicily. Despite his contemporary eminence in his field, it is difficult to estimate his skill and attainments, as no certain copy of his works is known to exist, although the Charioteer of Delphi has sometimes been attributed to him. Pliny reports that Pythagoras' skill exceeded even that of Myron, credits him with the innovation of sculpting athletes with visible veins, and calls him the first artist to aim for "rhythm and symmetry". In his Natural History he goes on to list several of Pythagoras' works, including a renowned pankratiast at Delphi. He was celebrated as the maker of seven nude statues (which some suggest may have represented the Seven against Thebes), and one of an old man, which, in Pliny's time, stood near the temple of Fortuna Huiusce Diei ("The Fortune of This Day"), which Quintus Lutatius Catulus had built in fulfillment of a vow made at the Battle of Vercellae. Pausanias mentions a statue of this name, and lists several of his works, including a sculpture of the boxer Euthymos, without mentioning this artist's home town. The base of the statue has been found at Olympia however, on which Pythagoras signs himself as "the Samian".

== See also ==
- Pythagoras, the mathematician who was also from Samos
