= Politics of Calabria =

The politics of Calabria, a region of Italy, takes place in the framework of an "anomalous presidential" representative democracy or prime-ministerial system with an executive presidency, whereby the President of Regional Government is the head of government, and of a pluriform multi-party system. Executive power is exercised by the Regional Government. Legislative power is vested in both the government and the Regional Council.

== Executive branch ==
The Regional Government (Giunta Regionale) is presided by the President of the Region (Presidente della Regione), who is elected for a five-year term, and is composed by the President and the Ministers (Assessori), of which there are currently eleven, including a Vice President (Vice Presidente).

=== List of presidents ===
Presidents elected by the Regional Council (1970–2000)

#	Name	Term of office		Political party	Legislature
1	Antonio Guarasci (1918–1974)	9 June 1970	2 October 1974	DC	I (1970)
2	Aldo Ferrara (1921–1997)	2 October 1974	17 June 1975	DC	I (1970)
3	Pasquale Perugini (1926–1996)	17 June 1975	1 January 1976	DC	II (1975)
(2)	Aldo Ferrara (1921–1997)	1 January 1976	10 June 1980	DC	II (1975)
4	Bruno Dominijanni (1922–2004)	10 June 1980	14 May 1985	PSI	III (1980)
5	Francesco Principe (1918–2008)	14 May 1985	30 December 1987	PSI	IV (1985)
6	Rosario Olivo (born 1940)	30 December 1987	7 May 1990	PSI	IV (1985)
6	Rosario Olivo (born 1940)	7 May 1990	1 February 1992	PSI	V (1990)
7	Guido Rhodio (1935–2023)	1 February 1992	10 August 1994	DC	V (1990)
8	Donato Veraldi (born 1941)	10 August 1994	14 June 1995	PPI	V (1990)
9	Giuseppe Nisticò (born 1941)	14 June 1995	9 May 1998	FI	VI (1995)
10	Giovanbattista Caligiuri (born 1944)	11 August 1998	22 January 1999	FI	VI (1995)
11	Luigi Meduri (born 1942)	22 January 1999	18 May 2000	PPI	VI (1995)

Directly-elected presidents (since 2000)

N.	Portrait	President	Term of office		Tenure (Years and days)	Party	Composition	Legislature
12		Giuseppe Chiaravalloti (1934–2025)	18 May 2000	2 May 2005	4 years, 349 days	FI	FI–AN–CDC–CDU–PS	VII (2000)
13		Agazio Loiero (born 1940)	2 May 2005	12 April 2010	4 years, 345 days	DL; PD	DS–DL–UDEUR–SDI–PRC–PdCI	VIII (2005)
14		Giuseppe Scopelliti (born 1966)	12 April 2010	29 May 2014 (Note: Resigned after a corruption scandal. His deputy Antonella Stasi (PdL) held the office till a new regional election was called.)	4 years, 47 days	PdL	PdL–UDC–NPSI–UDEUR	IX (2010)
15		Mario Oliverio (born 1953)	9 December 2014	15 February 2020	5 years, 77 days	PD	PD–ApI–SEL	X (2014)
16		Jole Santelli (1968–2020)	15 February 2020	15 October 2020 (Note: Died in office. Her deputy Antonino Spirlì (League) held the office till a new regional election was called.)	241 days	FI	FI–Lega–FdI–UDC	XI (2020)
17		Roberto Occhiuto (born 1969)	29 October 2021	4 August 2025	3 years, 279 days	FI	FI–FdI–Lega–CI–UDC	XII (2021)
17		Roberto Occhiuto (born 1969)	7 October 2025	Incumbent	284 days	FI	Centre-right coalition	XIII (2025)

== Legislative branch ==
The Regional Council of Calabria (Consiglio Regionale della Calabria) is composed of 50 members. 40 councillors are elected in provincial constituencies by proportional representation using the largest remainder method with a Droop quota and open lists, while 10 councillors (elected in bloc) come from a "regional list", including the President-elect. One seat is reserved for the candidate who comes second. If a coalition wins more than 50% of the total seats in the council with PR, only 5 candidates from the regional list will be chosen and the number of those elected in provincial constituencies will be 45. If the winning coalition receives less than 40% of votes, special seats are added to the council to ensure a large majority for the President's coalition. Parties obtaining less than 4% receive no seats, no matter if they are in coalition with larger parties or not.

The council is elected for a five-year term, but, if the President suffers a vote of no confidence, resigns or dies, under the simul stabunt, simul cadent clause introduced in 1999 (literally 'they will stand together or they will fall together'), also the council is dissolved and a snap election is called.

=== Current composition ===
The Regional Council of Calabria is composed of the following political groups:

Party	Seats	Status
Forza Italia (FI)	8 / 31	In government
Democratic Party (PD)	4 / 31	In opposition
Occhiuto for President	4 / 31	In government
Brothers of Italy (FdI)	4 / 31	In government
Lega	3 / 31	In government
Tridico for President	2 / 31	In opposition
Five Star Movement (M5S)	2 / 31	In opposition
Us Moderates (NM)	2 / 31	In government
Progressive Democrats (DP)	1 / 31	In opposition
Italia Viva (IV)	1 / 31	In opposition

By coalition:

Coalition	Seats	Status
Centre-right coalition	21 / 31	Government
Centre-left coalition	10 / 31	Opposition

== Local government ==
=== Provinces ===
There are five provinces in Calabria: Cosenza, Catanzaro, Crotone, Reggio Calabria, and Vibo Valentia. Catanzaro is the capital of the region.

Province	Inhabitants	President	Party	Election
Metropolitan City of Reggio Calabria	510,590	Francesco Cannizzaro (metropolitan mayor)	Forza Italia	2026
Catanzaro	361,783	Amedeo Mormile	Lega	2022
Cosenza	667,134	Biagio Faragalli	Forza Italia	2026
Crotone	174,890	Antonio Ammirati	Ind. (centre-right)	2026
Vibo Valentia	150,197	Corrado L'Andolina	Ind. (centre-right)	2023

=== Municipalities ===
Calabria is also divided in 404 comuni (municipalities), which have even more history, having been established in the Middle Ages when they were the main places of government.

Provincial capitals

Municipality	Inhabitants	Mayor	Party	Election
Catanzaro	89,364	Nicola Fiorita	Ind. (centre-left)	2022
Cosenza	69,484	Franz Caruso	Italian Socialist Party	2021
Crotone	58,881	Vincenzo Voce	Civic List	2020
Reggio Calabria	180,817	Francesco Cannizzaro	Forza Italia	2026
Vibo Valentia	33,357	Enzo Romeo	Ind. (centre-left)	2024

Other municipalities

Cities with more than 20,000 inhabitants.

Municipality	Inhabitants	Mayor	Party	Election
Corigliano-Rossano	74,848	Flavio Stasi	Independent (centre-left)	2019
Lamezia Terme	70,336	Paolo Mascaro	Independent (centre-right)	2015
Rende	33,555	Marcello Manna	Civic List	2019
Castrovillari	22,515	Domenico Lo Polito	Independent (centre-left)	2015
Acri	21,458	Pino Capalbo	Democratic Party	2017
Gioia Tauro	20,089	Aldo Alessio	Independent (centre-left)	2019

== Parties and elections ==
=== Latest regional election ===
In the latest regional election, which took place on 5–6 October 2025, incumbent president Roberto Occhiuto of Forza Italia was re-elected president by a wide margin, over Pasquale Tridico of the Five Star Movement. Forza Italia, which fielded three lists (other than the official one, "Occhiuto for President" and Forza Azzurri) was the largest party.

5–6 October 2025 Calabrian regional election results
Candidates	Votes	%	Seats	Parties	Votes	%	Seats
Roberto Occhiuto	453,926	57.26	1	Forza Italia	136,501	17.98	7
Roberto Occhiuto	453,926	57.26	1	Occhiuto for President	94,030	12.39	4
Roberto Occhiuto	453,926	57.26	1	Brothers of Italy	88,335	11.64	4
Roberto Occhiuto	453,926	57.26	1	League	71,381	9.40	3
Roberto Occhiuto	453,926	57.26	1	Us Moderates	30,613	4.03	2
Roberto Occhiuto	453,926	57.26	1	Christian Democracy – Union of the Centre	9,750	1.28	0
Roberto Occhiuto	453,926	57.26	1	Forza Azzurri	7,915	1.04	0
Roberto Occhiuto	453,926	57.26	1	South calls North – Animalist Party	1,527	0.20	0
Roberto Occhiuto	453,926	57.26	1	Total	440,052	57.98	20
Pasquale Tridico	330,813	41.73	1	Democratic Party	103,119	13.59	4
Pasquale Tridico	330,813	41.73	1	Tridico for President	57,813	7.62	2
Pasquale Tridico	330,813	41.73	1	Five Star Movement	48,775	6.43	1
Pasquale Tridico	330,813	41.73	1	Progressive Democrats	39,727	5.23	1
Pasquale Tridico	330,813	41.73	1	Reformist House	33,529	4.42	1
Pasquale Tridico	330,813	41.73	1	Greens and Left Alliance	29,251	3.85	0
Pasquale Tridico	330,813	41.73	1	Total	312,214	41.13	9
Francesco Toscano	7,992	1.01	0	Sovereign Popular Democracy	6.738	0.89	0
Total candidates	792,731	100.0	2	Total parties	759,004	100.0	29
Blank and invalid votes	22,126						
Registered voters/turnout	1,888,368	43.15					
Source: Calabria Region – Results
