= Regional Council of Calabria =

Legislative organ of Calabria, Italy

Regional Council of Calabria Consiglio Regionale della Calabria
- 13th Legislature

Type
- Type: Regional council Unicameral
- Established: 30 July 1970

Leadership
- President: Salvatore Cirillo, FI since 11 November 2025

Structure
- Seats: 31
- Political groups: Government (21): FI (8); Occhiuto List (4); FdI (4); Lega (3); NM (2); Opposition (10): PD (4); Tridico List (2); M5S (2); DP (1); IV (1)
- Length of term: 5 years

Elections
- Voting system: Party-list semi-proportional representation with majority bonus D'Hondt method
- Last election: 5 October 2025

Meeting place
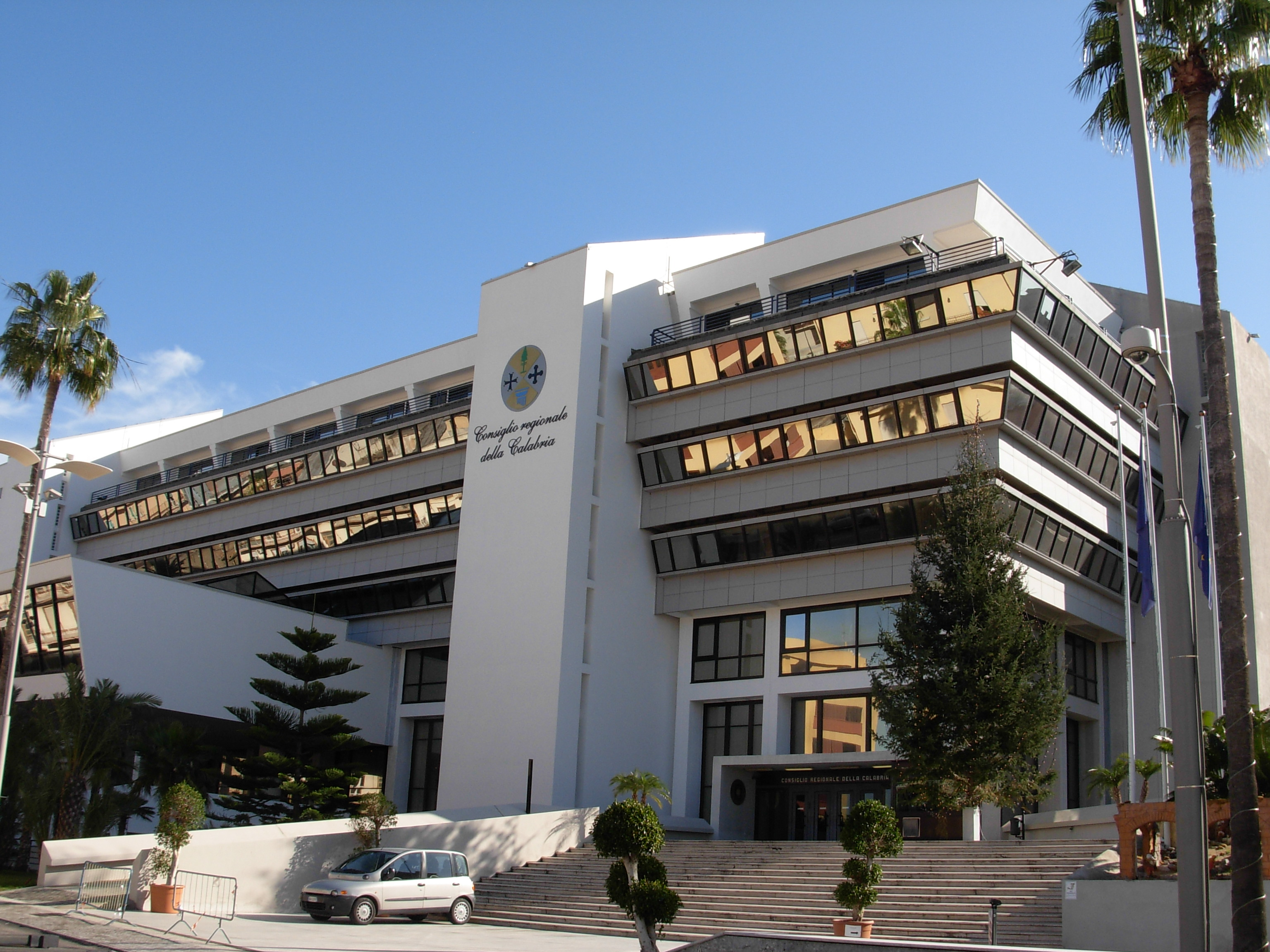
- Palazzo Campanella, Reggio Calabria

Website
- www.consiglioregionale.calabria.it

The Regional Council of Calabria (Italian: Consiglio Regionale della Calabria) is the regional council, hence the regional legislative authority, of Calabria.

It was first elected in 1970, when the ordinary Regions were instituted, on the basis of the Constitution of Italy of 1948. However, when Catanzaro, with a population of ~86,000 was chosen to become the regional capital of Calabria instead of Reggio Calabria with almost twice the population, it triggered a massive uprising in the latter city. Therefore, as a compromise solution, Reggio Calabria was chosen to be the seat of the Council.

The Council is currently suspended after the President of Calabria Roberto Occhiuto resigned on 4 August 2025 and called a snap regional election.

== Composition ==
The Regional Council of Calabria is composed of 31 members, of which 29 are elected in provincial constituencies with proportional representation, one is for the candidate for President who comes second, who usually becomes the leader of the opposition in the council, and one is for the elected president.

The Council is elected for a five-year term, but, if the president suffers a vote of no confidence, resigns or dies, under the simul stabunt vel simul cadent clause (introduced in 1999), also the Council will be dissolved and there will be a snap election.

The Council was originally composed of 40 members. The number of regional councillors increased to 42 in the 1995 regional election, to 43 in the 2000 regional election and finally to 50 in the 2005 regional election. Following the Law no. 138 of 13 August 2011, the number of regional councillors was finally reduced to 31.

=== Political groups (2025–2030) ===
The Regional Council of Calabria is composed of the following political groups:

Party	Seats	Status
Forza Italia (FI)	8 / 31	In government
Democratic Party (PD)	4 / 31	In opposition
Occhiuto for President	4 / 31	In government
Brothers of Italy (FdI)	4 / 31	In government
Lega	3 / 31	In government
Tridico for President	2 / 31	In opposition
Five Star Movement (M5S)	2 / 31	In opposition
Us Moderates (NM)	2 / 31	In government
Progressive Democrats (DP)	1 / 31	In opposition
Italia Viva (IV)	1 / 31	In opposition

By coalition:

Coalition	Seats	Status
Centre-right coalition	21 / 31	Government
Centre-left coalition	10 / 31	Opposition

=== Historical composition ===
Election	DC	PCI	PSI	PLI	PRI	PSDI	MSI	Others	Total
7 June 1970	17	10	6	1	1	2	2	1	40
15 June 1975	17	10	6	-	1	2	3	1	40
8 June 1980	18	10	7	-	1	2	2	-	40
12 May 1985	16	10	8	-	1	2	2	1	40
6 May 1990	16	8	9	1	1	2	2	1	40

Election	Majority	Opposition	Council	President of the Region
23 April 1995	Centre-right (Pole for Freedoms) 25 / 42	Centre-left (The Olive Tree) 13 / 42 PRC 3 / 42 PRI 1 / 42		Giuseppe Nisticò (1995–1998); Battista Caliguri (1998–1999); Luigi Meduri (1999–2000)
16 April 2000	Centre-right (House of Freedoms) 26 / 43	Centre-left (The Olive Tree) 17 / 43		Giuseppe Chiaravalloti (2000–2005)
3 April 2005	Centre-left (The Union) 30 / 50	Centre-right (House of Freedoms) 20 / 50		Agazio Loiero (2005–2010)
28 March 2010	Centre-right 30 / 50	Centre-left 17 / 50 IdV 3 / 50		Giuseppe Scopelliti (2010–2014)
23 November 2014 (snap election)	Centre-left 20 / 31	Centre-right 8 / 31 NCD 3 / 31		Mario Oliverio (2014–2020)
26 January 2020	Centre-right 20 / 31	Centre-left 11 / 31		Jole Santelli (2020†)
3 October 2021 (snap election)	Centre-right 21 / 31	Centre-left 8 / 31 De Magistris List 2 / 31		Roberto Occhiuto (since 2021)
5 October 2025 (snap election)	Centre-right 21 / 31	Centre-left 10 / 31		Roberto Occhiuto (since 2021)

== Presidents ==
This is a list of the Presidents of the Regional Council (Italian: Presidenti del Consiglio regionale):

Name	Period		Regional Legislature
Mario Casalinuovo (PSI)	30 July 1970	8 May 1973	I (1970)
Scipione Valentini (PSI)	8 May 1973	21 July 1975	I (1970)
Consalvo Aragona (PSI)	21 July 1975	4 August 1980	II (1975)
Rosario Chiriano (DC)	4 August 1980	24 May 1983	III (1980)
Anton Giulio Galati (DC)	24 May 1983	17 June 1985	III (1980)
Anton Giulio Galati (DC)	17 June 1985	11 June 1990	IV (1985)
Anton Giulio Galati (DC)	11 June 1990	4 May 1993	V (1990)
Domenico Romano Carratelli (DC)	4 May 1993	10 August 1994	V (1990)
Anton Giulio Galati (PPI)	10 August 1994	5 June 1995	V (1990)
Giuseppe Scopelliti (AN)	5 June 1995	22 May 2000	VI (1995)
Giovambattista Caliguri (FI)	22 May 2000	20 July 2001	VII (2000)
Luigi Fedele (FI)	20 July 2001	6 May 2005	VII (2000)
Giuseppe Bova (PD)	6 May 2005	4 May 2010	VIII (2005)
Francesco Talarico (UDC)	4 May 2010	29 May 2014	IX (2010)
Regional Council suspended
Antonio Scalzo (PD)	9 December 2014	28 July 2015	X (2014)
Nicola Irto (PD)	28 July 2015	26 March 2020	X (2014)
Domenico Tallini (FI)	26 March 2020	20 November 2020	XI (2020)
Giovanni Arruzzolo (FI)	20 November 2020	15 November 2021	XI (2020)
Filippo Mancuso (Lega)	15 November 2021	8 August 2025	XII (2021)
Regional Council suspended
Salvatore Cirillo (FI)	11 November 2025	Incumbent	XIII (2025)

== See also ==
- Regional council
- List of presidents of Calabria
- Regional politics of Italy
