= Elections in Calabria =

Italian regional elections

This page gathers the results of elections in Calabria.

== Regional elections ==
=== Latest regional election ===
In the latest regional election, which took place on 5–6 October 2025, incumbent president Roberto Occhiuto of Forza Italia was re-elected president by a wide margin, over Pasquale Tridico of the Five Star Movement. Forza Italia, which fielded three lists (other than the official one, "Occhiuto for President" and Forza Azzurri) was the largest party.

5–6 October 2025 Calabrian regional election results
Candidates	Votes	%	Seats	Parties	Votes	%	Seats
Roberto Occhiuto	453,926	57.26	1	Forza Italia	136,501	17.98	7
Roberto Occhiuto	453,926	57.26	1	Occhiuto for President	94,030	12.39	4
Roberto Occhiuto	453,926	57.26	1	Brothers of Italy	88,335	11.64	4
Roberto Occhiuto	453,926	57.26	1	League	71,381	9.40	3
Roberto Occhiuto	453,926	57.26	1	Us Moderates	30,613	4.03	2
Roberto Occhiuto	453,926	57.26	1	Christian Democracy – Union of the Centre	9,750	1.28	0
Roberto Occhiuto	453,926	57.26	1	Forza Azzurri	7,915	1.04	0
Roberto Occhiuto	453,926	57.26	1	South calls North – Animalist Party	1,527	0.20	0
Roberto Occhiuto	453,926	57.26	1	Total	440,052	57.98	20
Pasquale Tridico	330,813	41.73	1	Democratic Party	103,119	13.59	4
Pasquale Tridico	330,813	41.73	1	Tridico for President	57,813	7.62	2
Pasquale Tridico	330,813	41.73	1	Five Star Movement	48,775	6.43	1
Pasquale Tridico	330,813	41.73	1	Progressive Democrats	39,727	5.23	1
Pasquale Tridico	330,813	41.73	1	Reformist House	33,529	4.42	1
Pasquale Tridico	330,813	41.73	1	Greens and Left Alliance	29,251	3.85	0
Pasquale Tridico	330,813	41.73	1	Total	312,214	41.13	9
Francesco Toscano	7,992	1.01	0	Sovereign Popular Democracy	6.738	0.89	0
Total candidates	792,731	100.0	2	Total parties	759,004	100.0	29
Blank and invalid votes	22,126						
Registered voters/turnout	1,888,368	43.15					
Source: Calabria Region – Results

=== List of previous regional elections ===
- 1970 Calabrian regional election
- 1975 Calabrian regional election
- 1980 Calabrian regional election
- 1985 Calabrian regional election
- 1990 Calabrian regional election
- 1995 Calabrian regional election
- 2000 Calabrian regional election
- 2010 Calabrian regional election
- 2014 Calabrian regional election
- 2020 Calabrian regional election
- 2021 Calabrian regional election
