= List of presidents of Calabria =

President of Calabria
- Seal of Calabria

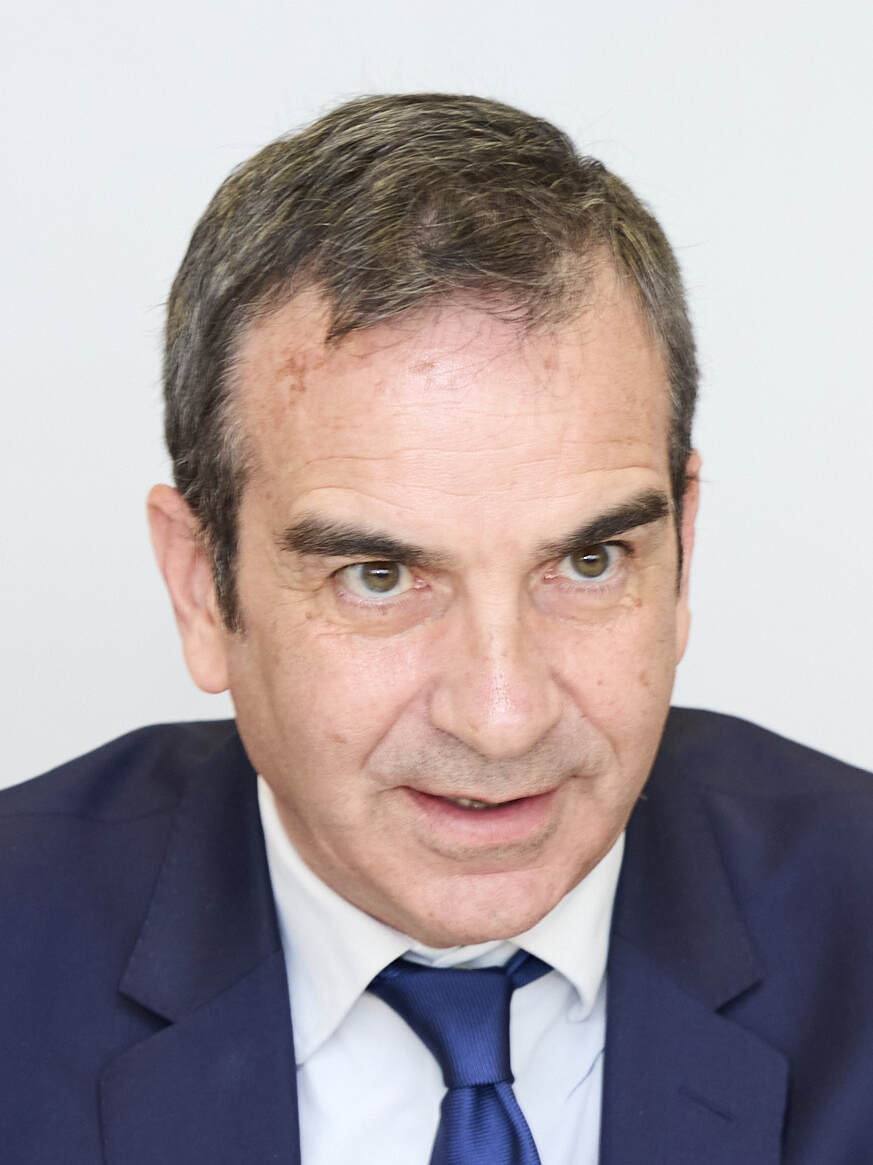
- Incumbent; Roberto Occhiuto since 7 October 2025
- Term length: Five years, no term limits
- Inaugural holder: Antonio Guarasci
- Formation: Italian Constitution

This is a list of the presidents of Calabria since 1970.

Until the entry into force of Constitutional Law 1/1999, the president of Calabria was elected, like the other members of the executive body of the region, by the Regional Council, among its members. Since the 2000 regional election, the president of Calabria is elected by universal and direct suffrage, appointing and dismissing the other members of the executive.

== List ==
Presidents elected by the Regional Council (1970–2000)

#	Name	Term of office		Political party	Legislature
1	Antonio Guarasci (1918–1974)	9 June 1970	2 October 1974	DC	I (1970)
2	Aldo Ferrara (1921–1997)	2 October 1974	17 June 1975	DC	I (1970)
3	Pasquale Perugini (1926–1996)	17 June 1975	1 January 1976	DC	II (1975)
(2)	Aldo Ferrara (1921–1997)	1 January 1976	10 June 1980	DC	II (1975)
4	Bruno Dominijanni (1922–2004)	10 June 1980	14 May 1985	PSI	III (1980)
5	Francesco Principe (1918–2008)	14 May 1985	30 December 1987	PSI	IV (1985)
6	Rosario Olivo (born 1940)	30 December 1987	7 May 1990	PSI	IV (1985)
6	Rosario Olivo (born 1940)	7 May 1990	1 February 1992	PSI	V (1990)
7	Guido Rhodio (1935–2023)	1 February 1992	10 August 1994	DC	V (1990)
8	Donato Veraldi (born 1941)	10 August 1994	14 June 1995	PPI	V (1990)
9	Giuseppe Nisticò (born 1941)	14 June 1995	9 May 1998	FI	VI (1995)
10	Giovanbattista Caligiuri (born 1944)	11 August 1998	22 January 1999	FI	VI (1995)
11	Luigi Meduri (born 1942)	22 January 1999	18 May 2000	PPI	VI (1995)

Directly-elected presidents (since 2000)

N.	Portrait	President	Term of office		Tenure (Years and days)	Party	Composition	Legislature
12		Giuseppe Chiaravalloti (1934–2025)	18 May 2000	2 May 2005	4 years, 349 days	FI	FI–AN–CDC–CDU–PS	VII (2000)
13		Agazio Loiero (born 1940)	2 May 2005	12 April 2010	4 years, 345 days	DL; PD	DS–DL–UDEUR–SDI–PRC–PdCI	VIII (2005)
14		Giuseppe Scopelliti (born 1966)	12 April 2010	29 May 2014 (Note: Resigned after a corruption scandal. His deputy Antonella Stasi (PdL) held the office till a new regional election was called.)	4 years, 47 days	PdL	PdL–UDC–NPSI–UDEUR	IX (2010)
15		Mario Oliverio (born 1953)	9 December 2014	15 February 2020	5 years, 77 days	PD	PD–ApI–SEL	X (2014)
16		Jole Santelli (1968–2020)	15 February 2020	15 October 2020 (Note: Died in office. Her deputy Antonino Spirlì (League) held the office till a new regional election was called.)	241 days	FI	FI–Lega–FdI–UDC	XI (2020)
17		Roberto Occhiuto (born 1969)	29 October 2021	4 August 2025	3 years, 279 days	FI	FI–FdI–Lega–CI–UDC	XII (2021)
17		Roberto Occhiuto (born 1969)	7 October 2025	Incumbent	1 year, 7 days	FI	Centre-right coalition	XIII (2025)

== See also ==
- Politics of Calabria
- Presidents of Italian regions
