= 2025 Calabrian regional election =

Italian regional election

- 5 and 6 October 2025

All 31 seats to the Regional Council of Calabria
- Opinion polls
- Registered: 1,888,368
- Turnout: 43.15% (▼1.21%)
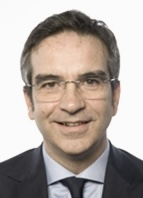

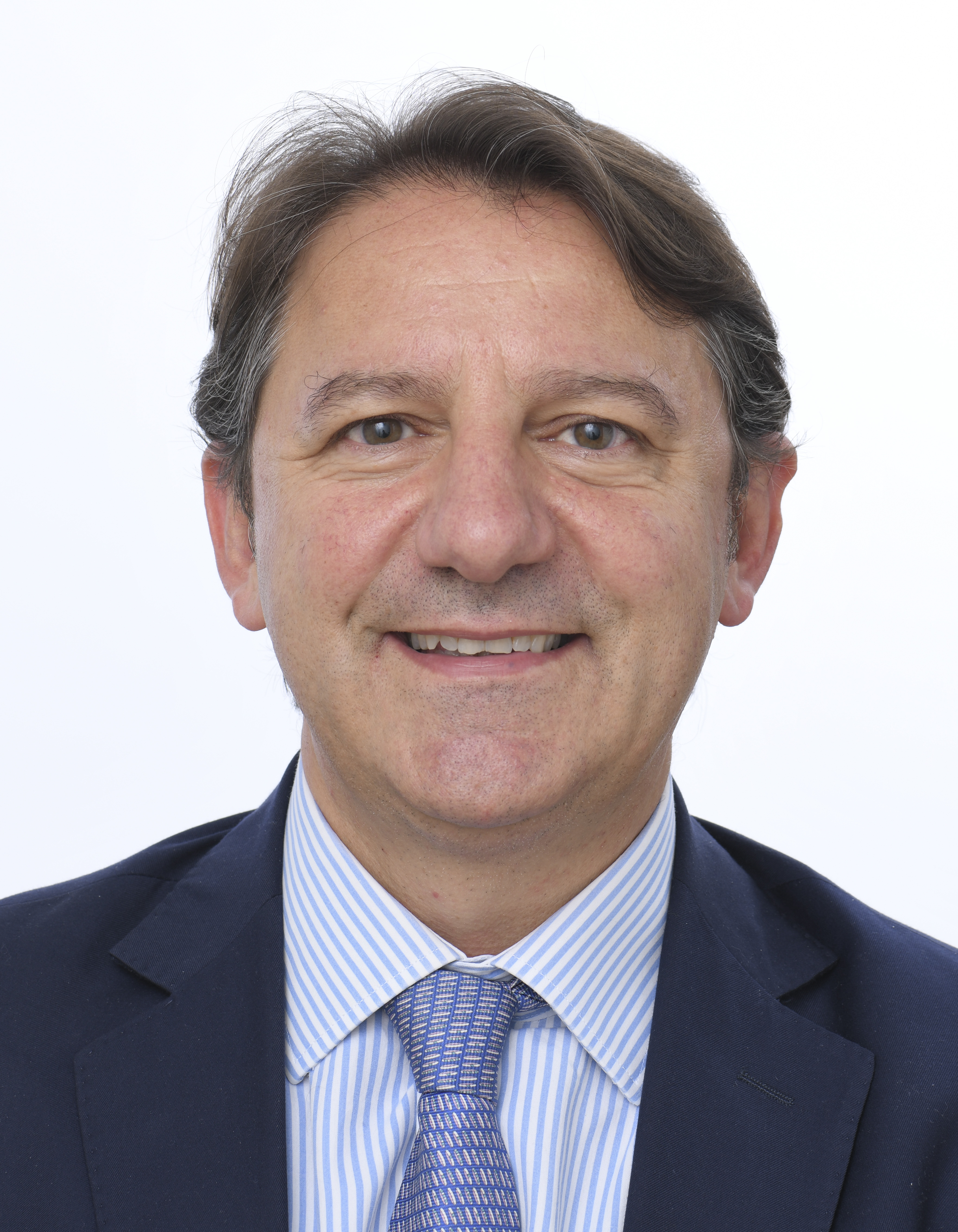
	Majority party	Minority party
Candidate	Roberto Occhiuto	Pasquale Tridico
Party	FI	M5S
Alliance	Centre-right	Centre-left
Seats won	21	10
Seat change	Steady	▲2
Popular vote	453,926	330,813
Percentage	57.3%	41.7%
Swing	▲2.8%	▲14.0%
- Map of the election results
President before election
Roberto Occhiuto
FI
Elected President
Roberto Occhiuto
FI

The 2025 Calabrian regional election took place in Calabria, Italy, on 5 and 6 October 2025, following the dissolution of the Regional Council after the resignation of the President Roberto Occhiuto on 4 August 2025 (which constituted a de facto calling of an early election).

== Electoral system ==
Even if a district list is linked to a regional list that exceeds 8% of the vote, the district list must obtain at least 4% of the vote in the whole region in order to elect their own representatives. To ensure governance, the candidate who receives the most votes wins a majority bonus of 55% of the seats.

Seat distribution of the XII legislature
District	Provinces	Seats
North	Cosenza	14
Center	Catanzaro	8
Center	Crotone	8
Center	Vibo Valentia	8
South	Reggio Calabria	7
President		1
Second-place President		1
Total		31

== Parties and candidates ==
=== Presidential candidate ===
Candidate	Experience	Alliance
Roberto Occhiuto	President of Calabria (2021–present); Member of the Chamber of Deputies for Calabria (2008–2013; 2014–2021)	Centre-right coalition
Pasquale Tridico	MEP for Southern Italy (2024–present); President of National Institute for Social Security (2019–2023)	Centre-left coalition

=== Parties and coalitions ===
This is a list of the parties, and their respective leaders, which will participate in the election.

Political party or alliance	Constituent lists	Previous result		Candidate
Political party or alliance	Constituent lists	Votes (%)	Seats	Candidate
Centre-right coalition	Forza Italia	17.3	7	Roberto Occhiuto
Centre-right coalition	League	8.3	4	Roberto Occhiuto
Centre-right coalition	Brothers of Italy	8.7	4	Roberto Occhiuto
Centre-right coalition	Forza Azzurri	8.1	2	Roberto Occhiuto
Centre-right coalition	Christian Democracy – Union of the Centre	4.6	1	Roberto Occhiuto
Centre-right coalition	Us Moderates	3.0	0	Roberto Occhiuto
Centre-right coalition	South calls North – Animalist Party	—N/a	—N/a	Roberto Occhiuto
Centre-right coalition	Occhiuto for President	—N/a	—N/a	Roberto Occhiuto
Centre-left coalition	Democratic Party	13.2	5	Pasquale Tridico
Centre-left coalition	Five Star Movement	6.5	2	Pasquale Tridico
Centre-left coalition	Greens and Left Alliance	0.5	0	Pasquale Tridico
Centre-left coalition	Reformist House (incl. IV, +E, PRI and dissidents from Az)	—N/a	—N/a	Pasquale Tridico
Centre-left coalition	Progressive Democrats (incl. PSI)	—N/a	—N/a	Pasquale Tridico
Centre-left coalition	Tridico for President (incl. DemoS and PRC)	—N/a	—N/a	Pasquale Tridico
Sovereign Popular Democracy		—N/a	—N/a	Francesco Toscano

== Opinion polls ==
=== Pollings ===
Date	Polling firm/ Client	Sample size	Occhiuto	Tridico	Toscano	Lead	Abstention / Turnout	Margin of error	Total contacts	Refusals	Method
12–14 September 2025	BiDiMedia (BiDiMedia srl)	1,000	53.0	46.0	1.0	7.0	42–47%	±3.1	1,735	735	CAWI (panel)
18 September 2025	IPSOS – Corriere della Sera	–	53.6	45.3	1.1	8.3	–	–	–	–	–
11–19 September 2025	Lab21 – La Gazzetta del Mezzogiorno	1,118	52.6–56.6	42.3–46.3	0.7–1.7	~6.3	–	–	3,823	2,705	CATI + CAWI
10 September 2025	Istituto Noto – Porta a Porta	–	~54.0	~45.0	–	~9.0	–	–	–	–	–

== Outcome ==
=== Result ===
5–6 October 2025 Calabrian regional election results
Candidates	Votes	%	Seats	Parties	Votes	%	Seats
Roberto Occhiuto	453,926	57.26	1	Forza Italia	136,501	17.98	7
Roberto Occhiuto	453,926	57.26	1	Occhiuto for President	94,030	12.39	4
Roberto Occhiuto	453,926	57.26	1	Brothers of Italy	88,335	11.64	4
Roberto Occhiuto	453,926	57.26	1	League	71,381	9.40	3
Roberto Occhiuto	453,926	57.26	1	Us Moderates	30,613	4.03	2
Roberto Occhiuto	453,926	57.26	1	Christian Democracy – Union of the Centre	9,750	1.28	0
Roberto Occhiuto	453,926	57.26	1	Forza Azzurri	7,915	1.04	0
Roberto Occhiuto	453,926	57.26	1	South calls North – Animalist Party	1,527	0.20	0
Roberto Occhiuto	453,926	57.26	1	Total	440,052	57.98	20
Pasquale Tridico	330,813	41.73	1	Democratic Party	103,119	13.59	4
Pasquale Tridico	330,813	41.73	1	Tridico for President	57,813	7.62	2
Pasquale Tridico	330,813	41.73	1	Five Star Movement	48,775	6.43	1
Pasquale Tridico	330,813	41.73	1	Progressive Democrats	39,727	5.23	1
Pasquale Tridico	330,813	41.73	1	Reformist House	33,529	4.42	1
Pasquale Tridico	330,813	41.73	1	Greens and Left Alliance	29,251	3.85	0
Pasquale Tridico	330,813	41.73	1	Total	312,214	41.13	9
Francesco Toscano	7,992	1.01	0	Sovereign Popular Democracy	6.738	0.89	0
Total candidates	792,731	100.0	2	Total parties	759,004	100.0	29
Blank and invalid votes	22,126						
Registered voters/turnout	1,888,368	43.15					
Source: Calabria Region – Results

Popular vote by party
FI	17.98%
PD	13.59%
Occhiuto	12.39%
FdI	11.64%
Lega	9.40%
Tridico	7.62%
M5S	6.43%
DP	5.23%
CR	4.42%
NM	4.03%
AVS	3.85%
DC–UdC	1.28%
FA	1.04%
DSP	0.89%
ScN–PAI	0.20%

Popular vote by president
Occhiuto	57.26%
Tridico	41.73%
Toscano	1.01%

Seat summary
Centre-right	67.74%
Centre-left	32.26%

=== Turnout ===
Voter turnout
Constituency
Constituency	Sunday			Monday	Previous Election	
Constituency	12:00	19:00	23:00	15:00	Previous Election	
Cosenza	7.64%	21.37%	26.21%	42.22%	44.87%	▼2.65%
Catanzaro	8.80%	26.00%	31.92%	45.58%	46.96%	▼1.38%
Crotone	7.53%	23.34%	28.80%	41.09%	39.61%	▲1.47%
Vibo Valentina	6.07%	20.64%	26.67%	38.91%	40.42%	▼1.51%
Reggio Calabria	7.64%	24.75%	32.24%	44.94%	44.64%	▲0.30%
(Calabria) Total	7.70%	23.19%	29.08%	43.15%	44.36%	▼1.21%
Ministry of Interior

=== Analysis ===
Occhiuto defeated Tridico by 15.5 points, receiving the strongest support in southern Calabria, where he obtained nearly two-thirds of the vote. He also performed well in the central part of the region, particularly in the province of Crotone. In northern Calabria, his margin was narrower, winning over Tridico by 4.5 points. Of the region’s ten largest cities with populations over 20,000, Occhiuto received more votes than Tridico in eight, while Tridico received more votes in Cosenza and the neighboring municipality of Rende.

Tridico’s support was strongest in and around Cosenza, the central part of Cosenza province around Acri, and along the Ionian coast east of Corigliano-Rossano, including his hometown of Scala Coeli, where he led by 70 points. The nearby municipality of Cariati was the only locality where both candidates received an equal number of votes, with 1,727 each (49.86%). Tridico also received a majority in several municipalities around the Isthmus of Catanzaro.

Tridico V Occhiuto by province
Province	Pasquale Tridico	Roberto Occhiuto	Francesco Toscano
Cosenza	140,657 47.20%	154,075 51.70%	3,262 1.09%
Crotone	20,993 34.09%	40,167 65.23%	419 0.68%
Catanzaro	65,438 43.61%	82,926 55.27%	1,674 1.12%
Vibo Valentia	30,275 47.07%	33,386 51.91%	655 1.02%
Reggio Calabria	73,450 33.57%	143,372 65.53%	1,982 0.91%

Tridico V Occhiuto by major cities
City	Pasquale Tridico	Roberto Occhiuto	Francesco Toscano
Reggio Calabria	27,294 37.42%	44,852 61.49%	791 1.08%
Catanzaro	16,498 44.84%	19,770 53.74%	522 1.42%
Corigliano-Rossano	12,078 45.18%	14,391 53.83%	265 0.99%
Lamezia Terme	9,277 35.17%	16,830 63.81%	269 1.02%
Cosenza	16,749 56.70%	12,387 41.93%	404 1.37%
Crotone	7,171 34.40%	13,446 64.50%	230 1.10%
Rende	9,488 57.39%	6,744 40.79%	300 1.81%
Vibo Valentia	6,284 47.52%	6,766 51.17%	173 1.31%
Castrovillari	4,403 47.47%	4,759 51.30%	114 1.23%
Montalto Uffugo	3,822 39.94%	5,669 59.24%	78 0.82%

=== Elected councilors ===
Party / List	Councilor elected	Preference votes	Constituency
Forza Italia	Roberto Occhiuto	President-Elect	
Forza Italia	Gianluca Gallo	30,165	North
Forza Italia	Pasqualina Straface	13,363	North
Forza Italia	Elisabetta Santoianni	10,661	North
Forza Italia	Sergio Ferrari	12,134	Centre
Forza Italia	Marco Polimeni	8,831	Centre
Forza Italia	Salvatore Cirillo	19,225	South
Forza Italia	Domenico Giannetta	10,452	South
Occhiuto for President	Pierluigi Caputo	14,791	North
Occhiuto for President	Rosaria Succurro	12,201	North
Occhiuto for President	Emanuele Ionà	6.833	Centre
Occhiuto for President	Giacomo Pietro Crinò	9.036	South
Brothers of Italy	Angelo Brutto	6,542	North
Brothers of Italy	Luciana De Francesco	6,542	North
Brothers of Italy	Antonio Montuoro	11,920	Centre
Brothers of Italy	Giovanni Calabrese	11,351	South
Lega	Orlandino Greco	5,154	North
Lega	Filippo Mancuso	12,130	Centre
Lega	Giuseppe Mattiani	12,619	South
Us Moderates	Riccardo Rosa	1,195	North
Us Moderates	Vito Pitaro	11,995	Centre
Five Star Movement	Pasquale Tridico	Elected as the second-place presidential candidate	
Five Star Movement	Elisa Scutellà	7,164	North
Democratic Party	Rosellina Madeo	6,719	North
Democratic Party	Ernesto Francesco Alecci	12,591	Centre
Democratic Party	Giuseppe Ranuccio	10,638	South
Democratic Party	Giuseppe Falcomatà	10,341	South
Tridico for President	Ferdinando Laghi	5,194	North
Tridico for President	Vincenzo Bruno	2,728	Centre
Progressive Democrats	Francesco De Cicco	6,076	North
Reformist House	Filomena Greco	6,670	North

== Background ==
On July 31, 2025, after being placed under investigation for corruption by the prosecutor's office of Catanzaro, Occhiuto announced on social media that he was resigning as president of the Calabria region while simultaneously declaring his intention to run for re-election. He stated that "it will be Calabrians who decide the future of Calabria, not others," and, referring to the investigation in which he was involved, that "no one is taking responsibility for signing anything." Occhiuto said he would formalize his resignation the following week, after which the regional Council would take note of it and a date for new elections would be set.

== See also ==
- 2025 Italian local elections
