= Members of the Regional Council of Calabria, 2005–2010 =

The Regional Council of Calabria, the legislative assembly of Calabria, VIII Legislature started in April 2005, following the 2005 regional election, and concluded in April 2010.

Party	Elect.	2005	2006	2007	2008
Democratic Party	-	-	-	18	19
Union of Christian and Centre Democrats	6	6	6	6	5
Forza Italia	5	5	5	5	5
Socialist Party	-	-	-	4	4
National Alliance	5	4	4	4	3
UDEUR	5	6	5	4	2
Communist Refoundation Party	2	2	2	2	2
New Italian Socialist Party	3	2	2	1	1
Party of Italian Communists	1	1	1	1	1
Italy of Values	1	1	1	1	1
Democrats of the Left	8	8	8	-	-
Democracy is Freedom – The Daisy	8	7	3	-	-
Italian Democratic Socialists	4	4	4	-	-
Southern Democratic Party	-	-	4	-	-
Christian Democracy for the Autonomies	-	1	1	1	-
Others	2	3	4	3	7
Total	50	50	50	50	50
