= Amalia Bruni =

Italian politician

Member of the Regional Council of Calabria
- Incumbent
- Assumed office 29 October 2021

Personal details
- Born: Amalia Cecilia Bruni; 3 April 1955 (age 71) Girifalco, Province of Catanzaro, Italy
- Education: University of Naples Federico II
- Profession: Neurologist

Amalia Cecilia Bruni (born 3 April 1955) is an Italian neurologist and politician. She was the centre-left candidate for President of Calabria in the 2021 Calabrian regional election. She has served as member of the Regional Council of Calabria since 29 October 2021.

Bruni holds a degree from the University of Naples.
