= Enzo Siviero =

Italian engineer, academic, writer

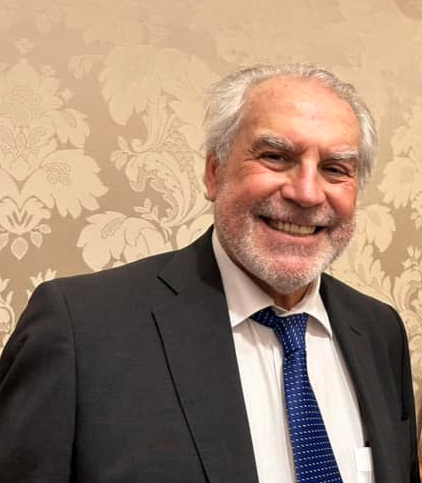
- Siviero in 2023
- Born: 19 January 1945 (age 81); Vigodarzere, Italy
- Education: Università Iuav di Venezia

Enzo Siviero (born 19 January 1945) is an Italian engineer, academic, and writer. and also an architect, as he received an honoris causa academic degree in architecture from the Polytechnic of Bari in 2009 at the age of 64.

== Biography ==
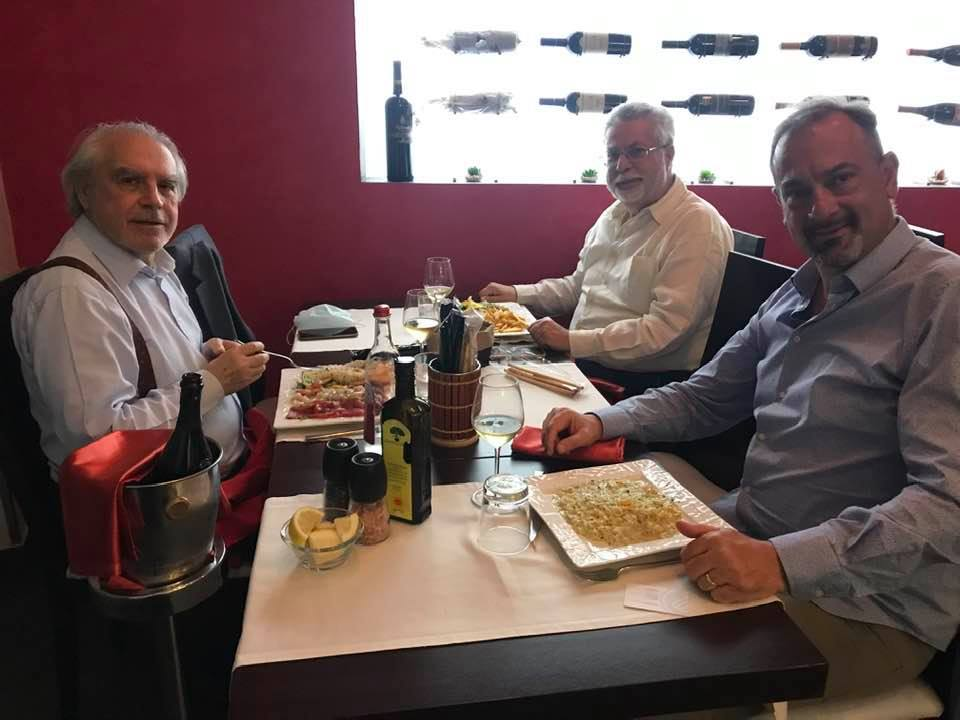
Enzo Siviero (left) in June 2021 in Messina on the occasion of the Conference on Infrastructures and Strait of Messina Bridge, the complaint: "South discriminated", in the company of the engineers Giovanni Mollica and Giuseppe Palamara.

In December 2016, at TUNeIT in Tunis he presented a 140 km bridge that would connect the Tunisian peninsula of Cape Bon (Africa) to Mazara del Vallo in Sicily (Europe). He is the rector of the Università degli Studi eCampus in Padua.

== Strait of Messina Bridge ==
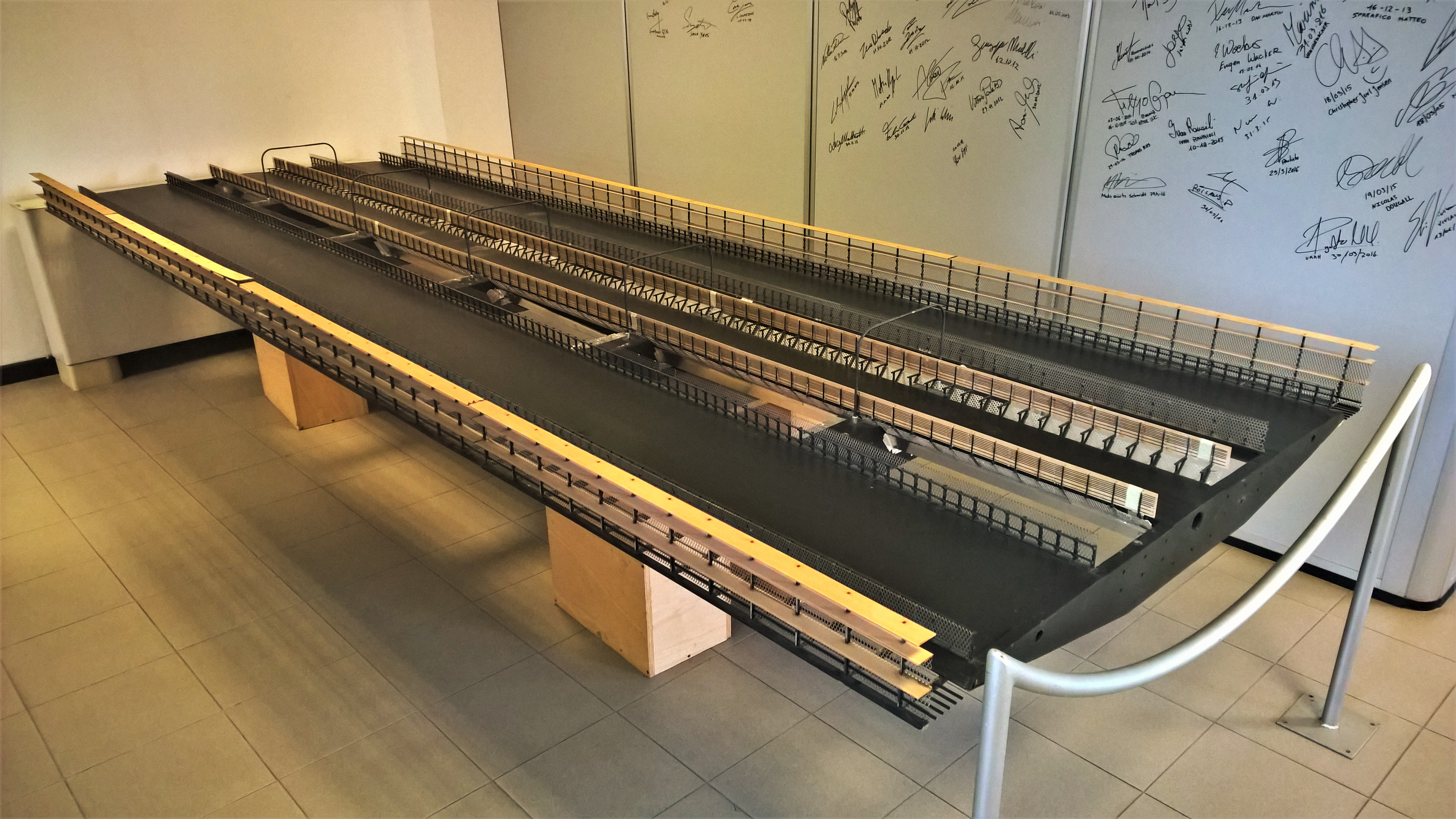
A section of the deck of the Messina Bridge.

A supporter of the usefulness of the construction of the Strait of Messina Bridge, he has held several conferences and lectures to convince skeptics of the importance of this work.

On 22 April 2021 participated with the CEO of Webuild, Pietro Salini, in Catania in a joint press conference with the President of the Sicilian Region Nello Musumeci and Calabria Region Antonino Spirlì, announced that he was ready to build the Strait of Messina Bridge, starting immediately with the works and on the basis of the executive project and construction site approved definitively in 2013. He declared that he already had the 4 billion euro coverage necessary for the construction of the Work and that he could obtain the other two necessary for the infrastructures connected to it from private financing. |

== Books ==
Professor Enzo Siviero has written more than a dozen books, the most important hereinafter, most often dealing with the theme of bridges.

- Siviero, Enzo; Claudio Modena (1992). La manutenzione programmata di ponti e viadotti. Padua: Cortina.
- Siviero, Enzo; Angelo Villa; Vittorio Dal Piaz (2007). Carlo Pradella ingegnere. Marsilio. ISBN 978-8831791182.
- Siviero, Enzo (2009). Ponteggiando - Bridging. Padua: Il Prato. ISBN 978-8863360813.
- Siviero, Enzo (2011). Bridgescape. Opere e progetti 1999-2010. Naples: La Scuola di Pitagora. ISBN 978-8865420270.
- Siviero, Enzo (2014). Il ponte umano. Venice: Libreria Cluva Editrice. ISBN 978-8897418115.

== See also ==
- Università degli Studi eCampus
