= Autonomy and Rights =

Italian political party

Autonomy and Rights (Autonomia e Diritti, AeD) is an Italian political party, based in Calabria.

The party is active mainly in regional elections. In 2010, when it was the closely linked to the incumbent President Agazio Loiero, the party gained 7.0% of the vote and four seats, while in 2014 it won 3.7% of the vote and no seats.
