= Guido Rhodio =

Italian politician (1935–2023)

President of Calabria
- In office 1 February 1992 – 10 August 1994
- Preceded by: Rosario Olivo
- Succeeded by: Donato Tommaso Veraldi

President of the Conference of Regions and Autonomous Provinces
- In office 1 January 1994 – 1 July 1994
- Preceded by: Vincenzo Del Colle
- Succeeded by: Antonio Boccia

Personal details
- Born: 17 September 1935 Squillace, Italy
- Died: 7 September 2023 (aged 87)
- Party: DC
- Occupation: Journalist

Guido Rhodio (17 September 1935 – 7 September 2023) was an Italian journalist and politician. A member of Christian Democracy, he served as President of Calabria from 1992 to 1994.

Rhodio died on 7 September 2023, at the age of 87.
