= 2021 Calabrian regional election =

Italian regional election

- 3 and 4 October 2021

All 31 seats to the Regional Council of Calabria
- Turnout: 44.36% (▲0.03%)
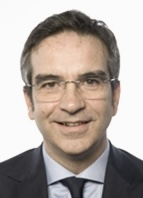

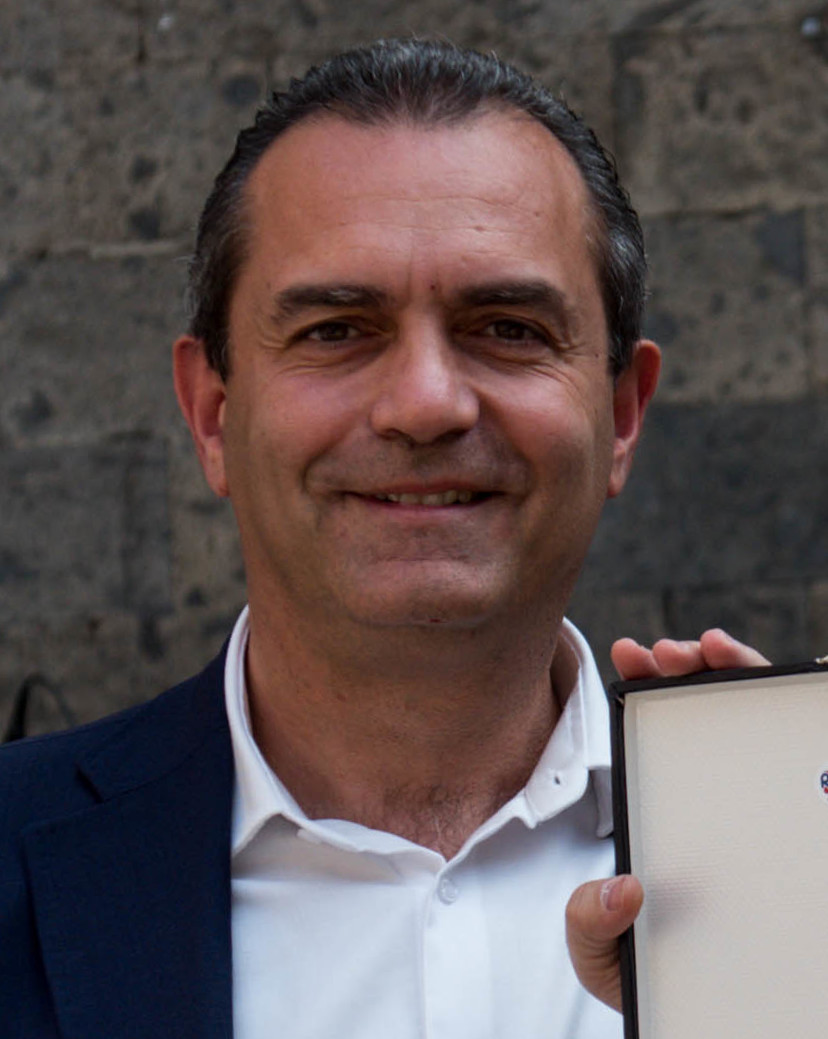
	Majority party	Minority party	Third party
Candidate	Roberto Occhiuto	Amalia Bruni	Luigi de Magistris
Party	Forza Italia	Independent	DemA
Alliance	Centre-right	Centre-left–M5S	Left-wing
Seats won	21	8	2
Seat change	▲1	▼3	▲2
Popular vote	431,675	219,389	128,204
Percentage	54.5%	27.7%	16.2%
- Seats won by each party in each electoral constituency and winner by province.
President before election
Antonino Spirlì (acting)
Lega Nord
Elected President
Roberto Occhiuto
Forza Italia

The 2021 Calabrian regional election took place in Calabria, Italy, on 3 and 4 October 2021, following the dissolution of the regional parliament after the death of regional president Jole Santelli. It was originally scheduled to take place on 14 February 2021, then on 11 April 2021, and was delayed due to the COVID-19 pandemic in Italy.

== Electoral system ==
Even if a district list is linked to a regional list that exceeds 8% of the vote, the district list must obtain at least 4% of the vote in the whole region in order to elect their own representatives. To ensure governance, the candidate who receives the most votes wins a majority bonus of 55% of the seats.

== Parties and candidates ==
This is a list of the parties, and their respective leaders, which will participate in the election.

Political party or alliance	Constituent lists	Previous result		Candidate
Political party or alliance	Constituent lists	Votes (%)	Seats	Candidate
Centre-right	Forza Italia	12.3	5	Roberto Occhiuto
Centre-right	League	12.3	4	Roberto Occhiuto
Centre-right	Brothers of Italy	10.9	4	Roberto Occhiuto
Centre-right	Union of the Centre	6.8	2	Roberto Occhiuto
Centre-right	Us with Italy (incl. PdF)	—N/a	—N/a	Roberto Occhiuto
Centre-right	Coraggio Italia	—N/a	—N/a	Roberto Occhiuto
Centre-right	Forza Azzurri – Occhiuto for President	—N/a	—N/a	Roberto Occhiuto
Centre-left	Democratic Party	15.2	5	Amalia Bruni
Centre-left	Five Star Movement	6.3	–	Amalia Bruni
Centre-left	Amalia Bruni for President – Safe Calabria	—N/a	—N/a	Amalia Bruni
Centre-left	Treasure Calabria	5.2	–	Amalia Bruni
Centre-left	Italian Socialist Party	—N/a	—N/a	Amalia Bruni
Centre-left	Green Europe	—N/a	—N/a	Amalia Bruni
Centre-left	Animalist Party – Progressive Democrats (incl. Art. 1)	—N/a	—N/a	Amalia Bruni
de Magistris coalition	Democracy and Autonomy	—N/a	—N/a	Luigi de Magistris
de Magistris coalition	de Magistris for President	—N/a	—N/a	Luigi de Magistris
de Magistris coalition	United with de Magistris	—N/a	—N/a	Luigi de Magistris
de Magistris coalition	For Calabria with de Magistris	—N/a	—N/a	Luigi de Magistris
de Magistris coalition	Another Calabria is Possible (incl. SI)	—N/a	—N/a	Luigi de Magistris
de Magistris coalition	Resistant and Solidary Calabria (incl. PaP, PCI)	—N/a	—N/a	Luigi de Magistris
Oliviero coalition	Oliverio for President – Calabrian Identity	—N/a	—N/a	Mario Oliverio

=== Potential candidates ===
- Centre-left coalition: Jasmine Cristallo, Anna Falcone Pietro Grasso, Marco Minniti, Franco Mirabelli, Antonio Viscomi.
- Centre-right coalition: Sergio Abramo, Fulvia Caligiuri, Gianluca Gallo, Maria Limardo, Mario Occhiuto.
- Five Star Movement: Nicola Morra.

=== Withdrawn candidates ===
- Centre-left coalition: Nicola Irto, Maria Antonietta Ventura.

== Opinion polls ==
=== Candidates ===
Date	Polling firm/Client	Sample size	Occhiuto	Bruni	De Magistris	Oliverio	Undecided	Lead
12–15 Sep 2021	Noto	1,000	46.0	30.0	19.0	5.0	34.0	16.0
12–14 Sep 2021	Winpoll	1,000	39.4	39.2	18.9	2.5	—N/a	0.2
8–10 Sep 2021	EMG	1,000	48.0	30.0	19.0	3.0	—N/a	18.0

=== Parties ===
Date	Polling firm	Sample size	Centre-right							Centre-left				De Magistris	Oliverio	Lead
Date	Polling firm	Sample size	FdI	FI	Lega	FA	UDC	NcI	CI	PD	M5S	PSI	Other	De Magistris	Oliverio	Lead
8–10 Sep 2021	EMG	—N/a	12.0	10.0	8.0	5.0	5.0	5.0	4.0	15.0	7.0	3.0	6.0	17.0	3.0	3.0
26 Jan 2020	Election result	-	10.9	12.3	12.3	DNP	6.8	DNP	DNP	15.2	6.3	DNP	DNP	DNP	DNP	2.9

== Results ==
3 and 4 October 2021 Calabrian regional election results
Candidates	Votes	%	Seats	Parties	Votes	%	Seats
Roberto Occhiuto	431,675	54.46	1	Forza Italia	131,882	17.31	7
Roberto Occhiuto	431,675	54.46	1	Brothers of Italy	66,277	8.70	4
Roberto Occhiuto	431,675	54.46	1	League	63,459	8.33	4
Roberto Occhiuto	431,675	54.46	1	Forza Azzurri – Occhiuto for President	61,828	8.11	2
Roberto Occhiuto	431,675	54.46	1	Coraggio Italia	43,159	5.66	2
Roberto Occhiuto	431,675	54.46	1	Union of the Centre	34,923	4.58	1
Roberto Occhiuto	431,675	54.46	1	Us with Italy	23,138	3.04	–
Roberto Occhiuto	431,675	54.46	1	Total	424,666	55.72	20
Amalia Bruni	219,389	27.68	1	Democratic Party	100,437	13.18	5
Amalia Bruni	219,389	27.68	1	Five Star Movement	49,414	6.48	2
Amalia Bruni	219,389	27.68	1	Amalia Bruni for President – Safe Calabria	28,733	3.77	–
Amalia Bruni	219,389	27.68	1	Treasure Calabria	17,358	2.38	–
Amalia Bruni	219,389	27.68	1	Italian Socialist Party	7,024	0.92	–
Amalia Bruni	219,389	27.68	1	Green Europe	3,755	0.49	–
Amalia Bruni	219,389	27.68	1	Animalist Party – Progressive Democrats	2,259	0.30	–
Amalia Bruni	219,389	27.68	1	Total	208,980	27.42	7
Luigi de Magistris	128,204	16.17	–	de Magistris for President	39,338	5.16	2
Luigi de Magistris	128,204	16.17	–	Democracy and Autonomy	25,929	3.40	–
Luigi de Magistris	128,204	16.17	–	Another Calabria is possible	18,235	2.39	–
Luigi de Magistris	128,204	16.17	–	United with de Magistris	12,390	1.63	–
Luigi de Magistris	128,204	16.17	–	For Calabria with de Magistris	10,547	1.38	–
Luigi de Magistris	128,204	16.17	–	Resistant and Solidary Calabria	9,175	1.20	–
Luigi de Magistris	128,204	16.17	–	Total	115,614	15.17	2
Mario Oliverio	13,440	1.70	–	Oliverio for President – Calabrian Identity	12,838	1.68	–
Blank and invalid votes	45,983	5.48					
Total candidates	792,708	100.00	2	Total parties	762,098	100.00	29
Registered voters/turnout	1,890,732	44.36					
Source: Ministry of the Interior – Election in Calabria
