= Nicola Irto =

Italian politician (born 1982)

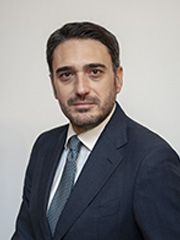
- Irto in 2022

Member of the Senate
- Incumbent
- Assumed office 13 October 2022
- Constituency: Calabria – 01

Personal details
- Born: 5 January 1982 (age 44)
- Party: Democratic Party (since 2007)

Nicola Irto (born 5 January 1982) is an Italian politician serving as a member of the Senate since 2022. From 2015 to 2020, he served as president of the Regional Council of Calabria.
