= National Institute for Social Security (Italy) =

Main entity of the Italian public retirement system

Istituto nazionale della previdenza sociale

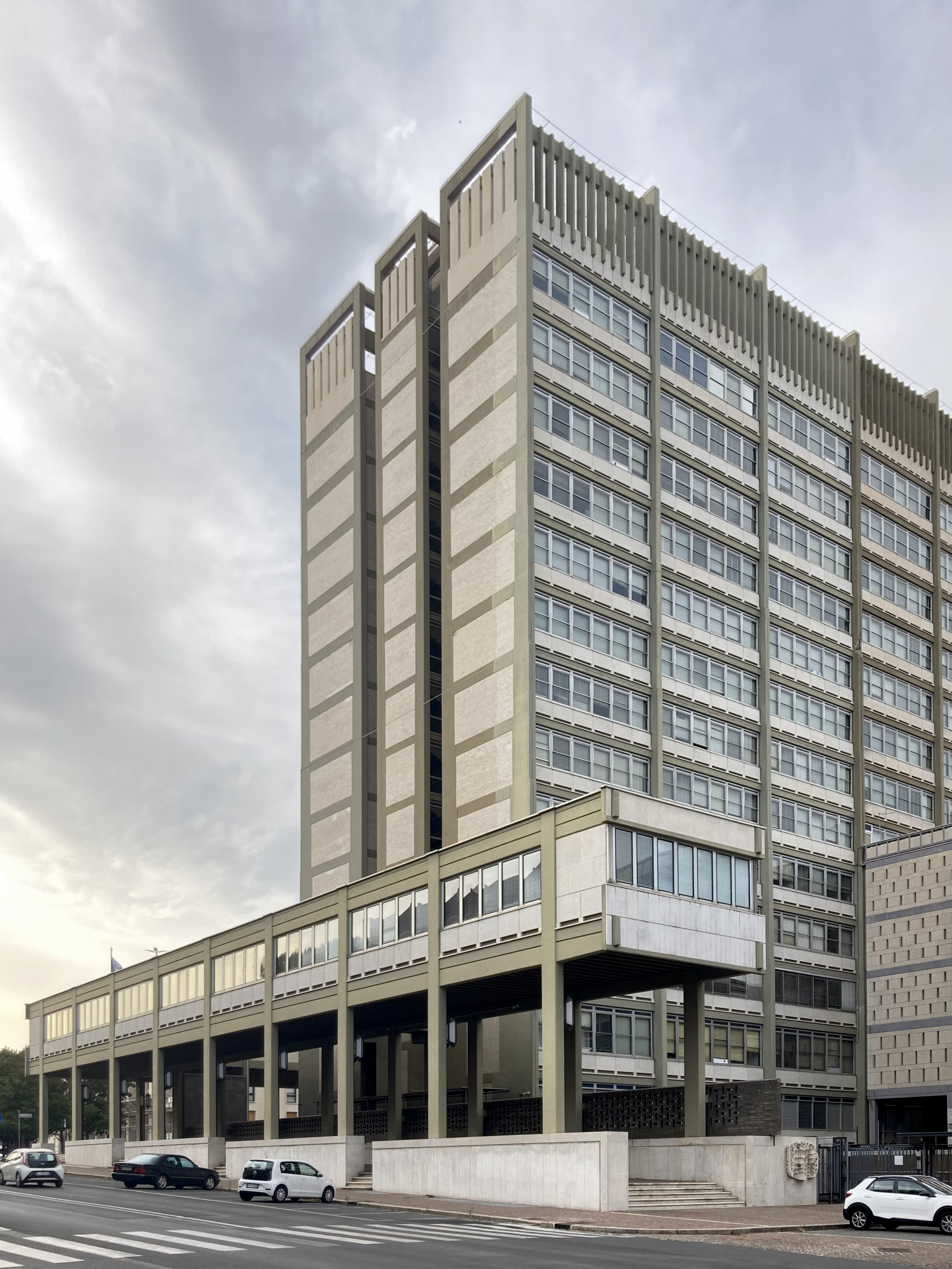
- Headquarters in Rome

Public entity overview
- Formed: 1898
- Jurisdiction: Government of Italy
- Headquarters: Via Ciro il Grande, 21, Rome, Italy
- Employees: 25,821 (2023)
- Annual budget: ▲€824.49 billion (2023) Revenues: €410.81 billion Expenses: €413.68 billion (Income Statement 2023)
- Public entity executives: Gabriele Fava, President; Valeria Vittimberga, General Manager
- Website: www.inps.it

The National Institute for Social Security (Italian: Istituto nazionale della previdenza sociale, INPS) is the main public entity and authority of the Italian public retirement system. All waged labourers and most of self-employed, without a proper autonomous social security fund, must be subscribed to INPS. The entity is under the supervision of the Ministry of Labour and Social Policies.

Its main activity is to guarantee public services related to social security benefits according to the art. 38 of the Italian Constitution and the special laws about the mandatory social insurances.

== History ==
In 1898, the Cassa nazionale di previdenza per l'invalidità e la vecchiaia degli operai ('National Fund of Social Security for Disability and Old Age of the Workers') was founded as a voluntary association integrated with a contribute by State and entrepreneurs. In 1919 it became mandatory according to the law-decree n. 603 of 21 April 1919, n. 603. The decree remained awaiting the conversion in law by the Chamber. On 5 February 1920 the decree was represented by the minister Carlo Ferraris and on the next 25 June it was represented again by the minister Arturo Labriola of Giolitti V Cabinet. It was converted only in 1923 through a decree giving law force to the provision. The entity was renamed as Cassa nazionale per le assicurazioni sociali ('National Fund for Social Insurances).

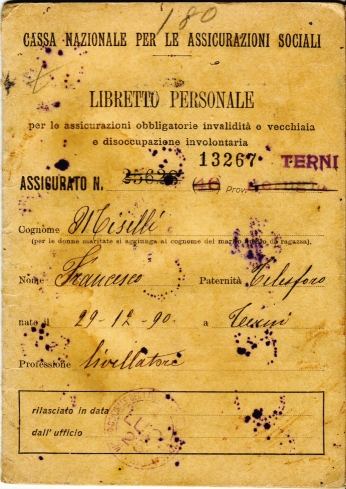
A "Personal Booklet" issued by the CNAS office of Terni on 1º July 1925

The Mussolini Cabinet changed the National Fund into the Istituto nazionale fascista della previdenza sociale ('National Fascist Institute of Social Security') or INFPS. Its first president was Giuseppe Bottai, succeeded in 1935 by Bruno Biagi.

Subsequent interventions made by Italian lawmakers expanded significantly the purposes of the institute to which were assigned the management of first interventions in benefit of the income already in 1939. In 1944 the institute became the Istituto nazionale della previdenza sociale, a public entity with legal personality and autonomous management.

During the period 1968–1972, the Italian State introduced retirement pensions and social pensions for every citizen over 65 years and under a certain income threshold. The extraordinary wage supplementation fund and early retirement were introduced along with tax relieves for the production.

In 1978 the National Healthcare Service (Servizio Sanitario Nazionale) was established and INPS had been charged of collecting illness contributions and pay the related benefits.

The law n. 88 of 9 March 1989 had reformed INPS and financially divided the general assistance from the social security.

Since the Nineties, especially since the Law n. 335 of 1995, better known in Italy as Dini Reform, various social security institutes of categories, managers and some professional orders, most notably INPDAI (industrial companies managers social security institute), IPOST (Post Service workers social security institute), SCAU (rural workers social security institute), ENPAS (subsidiary of INPDAP for state level public workers), INADEL (local government level public workers social security institute, subsidiary of INPDAP), ENPDEP (public law entities workers social security institute), ENAM (special social security institute for teachers of the defunct Magistral schools, former high school of human sciences) among others have been merged into INPS, with the assumption by the latter of the related debts and savings on administrative costs, deriving from pension management by a single body.

Since 1992, reforms had been oriented to contain the social security bubble caused by the generous reforms of the seventies such as baby pensions, retirement pensions and inflated pensions.

In 1995 the previously mentioned Law n. 335 of 1995 introduced the Separated Management, the social security management for autonomous (managers and self-employed) and para-subordinated (consultant, agency and brokerage) workers.

The law decree n. 201 of 6 December 2011, known as "Salva Italia" (Saving Italy), ordered the incorporation of INPDAP (former public workers social security institute) and ENPALS (sport-entertainment workers social security institute) into the INPS, transferring to it all the related functions and liabilities.

With this new law, the number of subscribers to INPS funds increased to 95% of all Italian workers, thus confirming the transition from the corporative social security model to the universal one started with the aforementioned Dini Reform (Law n. 335 of 1995).

This transition from an archaic corporative model to a more contemporary universal social security system is still ongoing, with the latest transfer and merging of INPGI (publishers and journalists social security institute) into INPS happened on July 1st 2022, as established by the Law n. 234 of 2021 (Legge di Bilancio 2022).

== Description ==
=== Funding system ===
INPS gives pensions and other social security services with taxes derived for about the 70% from mandatory contributions for obligatory insurances and for the remaining 30% through direct transfers by the State.

=== Administration ===
Vittorio Conti had been president of INPS since 1º February 2014 as commissioner after the resignation of Antonio Mastrapasqua. On 1º October 2014, Tiziano Treu became president as extraordinary commissioner. On 24 December 2014, former Prime Minister Matteo Renzi announced the nominee of the economist Tito Boeri as new president of INPS.

During the Council of Ministers of 21 May 2019, Pasquale Tridico was chosen as the president of INPS.

=== Name in minority languages of Italy ===
In the Italian regions where there is bilingualism, the name and abbreviation of INPS are translated:

- In Aosta Valley, bilingual Italian/French, Institut national de la prévoyance sociale (INPS)
- In South Tyrol, Trentino and other bilingual Italian/German areas, Nationalinstitut für Soziale Fürsorge (NISF)

== Activities ==
=== Social security administration and management ===
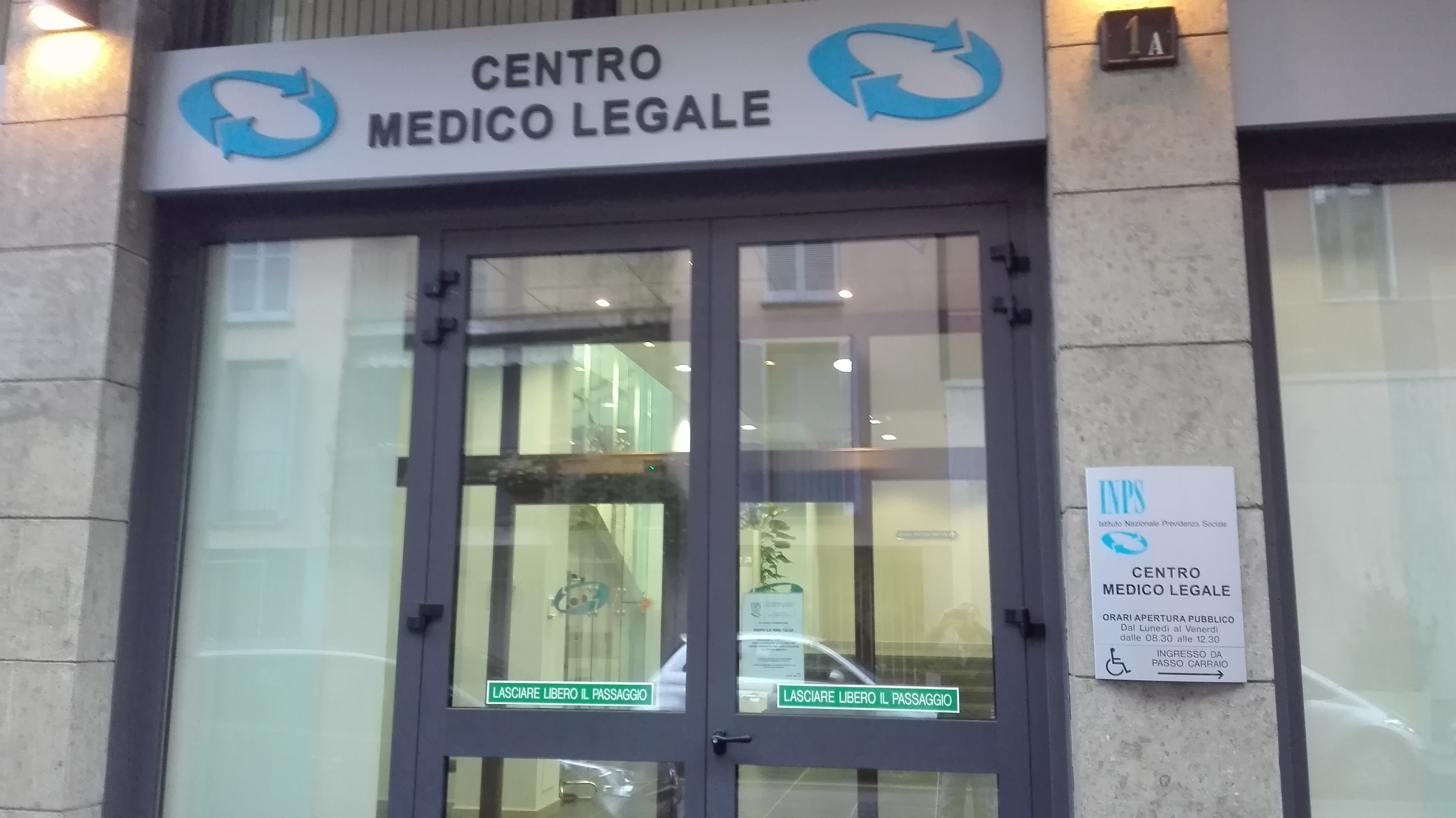
INPS Legal medical centre in Milan

The main activity of INPS consists on providing pensions and other services of social security to who has the right. It also does contributory activity collecting the contributions.

The services are based on a mandatory insurance relationship and are funded with the contributions of employed workers, elaborated as a percentage of the wage.

=== Management of services supporting income ===
Along with pensions, the institute pays all the services supporting the income such as:

- Unemployment benefits
- Benefits for sick leave
- Benefits for maternity leave
- Allowances to the family unit
- Interventions of ordinary and extraordinary wage supplementation fund
- Interventions of the guarantee fund for severance packages
- Interventions against tuberculosis
- Interventions for spa healthcare
- Mobility allowances
- Interventions for rural unemployment
- Interventions according to law n. 104 of 2 May 1990 (Disability leave)
- Payment for assistance services provided by the comune (check after the third son)
- ISEE declarations
- Management of medical control visits for private and public workers
- Management of authorizations for the right to the allowances to the family unit

=== Welfare ===
"Welfare" pensions (civil disability, integration of pension at minimal treatment, social check) are considered as welfare state interventions and they are managed by INPS outside an insurance relationship. These pensions are mostly funded by public financings for INPS.

=== Inspection ===
The vigilance activity of INPS is aimed to control the precise payment of contributions according to the law as well as the compliance with the mandatory rules in benefit of the employee.

Already required by law n. 483 of 14 November 1992, this kind of activity has been regulated by INPS itself. The main purposes are the contrast to the contributive evasion, unreported employment and undue receipt of social security benefits.

INPS issues an annual operative plan tending to the fight against unreported employment and to the systematic control of regularity in payments and the contributive fairness (using the benefits) of the various subjects required to pay contributions. This plan premises an accurate analysis of the territory aimed to target the intervention areas and the kind of companies at high risk of evasion, as well as to define the commodity sectors to be considered for an inspection. New elements regarding the planning process have been introduced, increasing the effectiveness of the inspective action done by the institute.

The new planning process of the supervision plan foresees a strong interaction with the regional headquarters which can suggest specific hypothesis of inspective action within their competence.

INPS performs often its inspective action jointly with labour inspectors, the Command of the Carabinieri for job tutelage, as well as INAIL, the Service for prevention and security in workplaces of public local healthcare companies and the Guardia di Finanza.

=== Other activities ===
INPS performs other activities related to its competences, including:

- Medical visits for ascertaining disability and inability, as well as for the access to spa treatments through agreements with local companies
- Management of databases related to the calculation of the indicator of the equivalent economic situation which allows the use of some benefits in social services
- Required activities for the withdrawal of contributions, including the subscription of companies, the opening of an insurance account for employed and autonomous workers, the denounce of the report regarding housework and the release of the insurance account and certification statement
- Granting a certified email address to all the users subscribed on the official website of INPS.

== Publishing ==
INPS issues the quarterly journal Informazione previdenziale, edited by the advocacy of the institute and dedicated to the issues about work rights and social security.

== Legal aspects ==
INPS, as a public entity, does not declare profits and it is based on a solidarity agreement between generations. The solidarity aim and the absence of profit do not configure INPS as a company.

The social security is managed by a public entity according to the Italian Constitution. However, the "private-sector assistance may be freely provided" but the article means that the social security tutelage for workers represents a fundamental purpose of the Italian State according to its Constitution.

This kind of social security organization based on public entities complies with the principles of European community rights. The Court of Justice of the European Union has stated that a legal monopoly of social security entrusted to public entities does not represent an abuse of dominant position at all and therefore it is not disputable before the antitrust authorities according to the article 86 of the EU Treaty.

Reports of the European Union declare the right to assistance and social security in the event of old age, without any specification if this right has to be secured by the State or private entities. The right to social security in the event of old age has not a specific or dedicated regulation but it is combined with the protection in cases like maternity, illness or accidents at work.

== See also ==
- Ministry of Labour and Social Policies (Italy)
- INAIL
- INPDAP
