= Roberto Occhiuto =

Italian politician (born 1969)

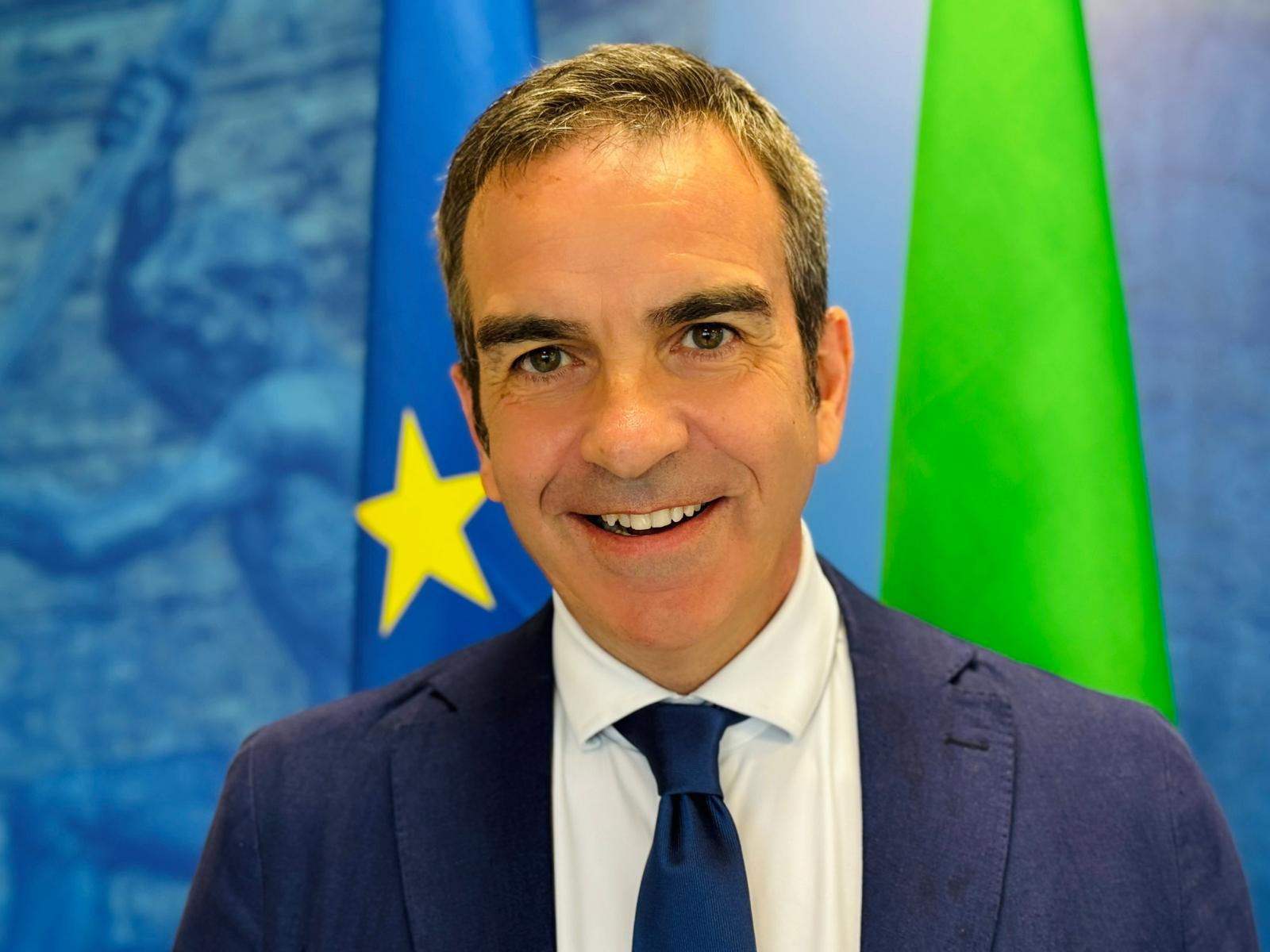
- Occhiuto in 2025

President of Calabria
- Incumbent
- Assumed office 29 October 2021
- Preceded by: Antonino Spirlì (acting)

Member of the Chamber of Deputies
- In office 25 June 2014 – 4 November 2021
- In office 29 April 2008 – 14 March 2013
- Constituency: Calabria

Personal details
- Born: 13 May 1969 (age 57) Cosenza, Italy
- Party: DC (till 1994); PPI (1994–1995); CDU (1995–2000); FI (2000–2002); UDC (2002–2013); FI (since 2013)
- Relatives: Mario Occhiuto (brother)
- Education: University of Calabria
- Occupation: Politician

Roberto Occhiuto (born 13 May 1969), is an Italian politician. He has served as the President of Calabria since 29 October 2021.

== Biography ==
=== Comunal and regional councilor ===
Brother of Mario Occhiuto, mayor of Cosenza from 2011 to 2021, Occhiuto was elected for the first time as communal councilor in his hometown Cosenza in 1993, holding his seat until 2000. Occhiuto was later elected as regional councilor of Calabria in the 2000 and the 2005 regional elections.

=== Member of the Chamber of Deputies ===
Occhiuto was elected to the Chamber of Deputies with the Union of the Centre at the 2008 Italian general election. Failing re-election in 2013, he took over Lorenzo Cesa's seat the following year, after the latter was elected to the European Parliament.

After he joined Silvio Berlusconi's Forza Italia, Occhiuto was re-elected deputy at the 2018 election and became Forza Italia group leader at the Chamber of Deputies after Mariastella Gelmini appointment as Minister of Regional Affairs in the Draghi Cabinet.

=== 2009 provincial election ===
Occhiuto ran in 2009 as the Union of the Centre candidate for the office of President of the Province of Cosenza but failed the election by ranking third.

=== 2021 regional election ===
After the sudden death of Jole Santelli and the calling for new regional elections, Occhiuto was appointed as the centre-right candidate for the office of President of Calabria.

=== 2025 regional election ===
On 4 August 2025 he resigned after being investigated for corruption and called a snap election on 5–6 October 2025.

== Personal life ==
On 22 September 2022, he became father of Tommaso, his third son, born from politician Matilde Siracusano. Occhiuto already had two children from a previous marriage.
