= 2014 Calabrian regional election =

Italian regional election

- 23 November 2014
- Turnout: 44%
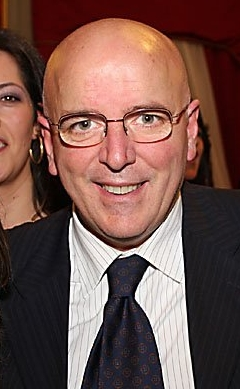

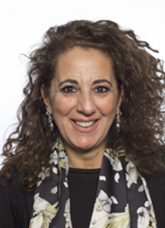
	Majority party	Minority party
Leader	Mario Oliverio	Wanda Ferro
Party	Democratic Party	Forza Italia
Alliance	Centre-left	Centre-right
Seats won	19	8
Seat change	▼1	▼22
Popular vote	490,229	188,288
Percentage	61.4%	23.6%
Swing	▲19.2%	▼34.2%
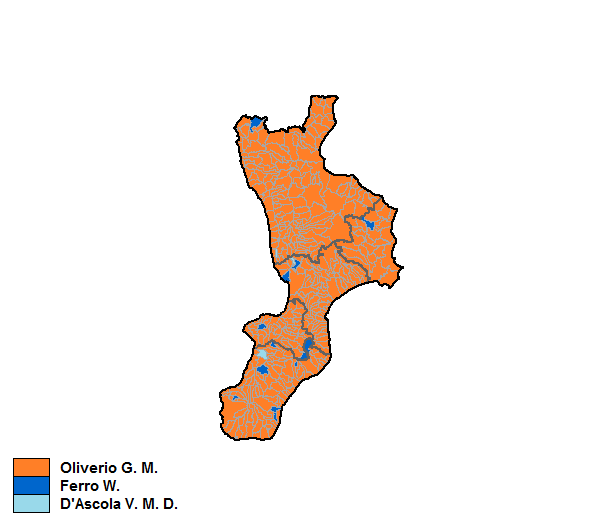
President before election
Giuseppe Scopelliti
New Centre-Right
Subsequent President
Mario Oliverio
Democratic Party

The 2014 Calabrian regional election took place on 23 November 2014. The election took place after the incumbent president, Giuseppe Scopelliti of The People of Freedom (PdL), had been forced to resign because of a conviction for abuse of power. Mario Oliverio of the Democratic Party was elected as his successor.

== Results ==
23 November 2014 Calabria regional election results
Candidates	Votes	%	Seats	Parties	Votes	%	Seats
Mario Oliverio	490,229	61.41	1	Democratic Party (incl. PSI)	185,209	23.67	9
Mario Oliverio	490,229	61.41	1	Oliverio for President	97,618	12.48	5
Mario Oliverio	490,229	61.41	1	Progressive Democrats	56,928	7.28	3
Mario Oliverio	490,229	61.41	1	Calabria in Network (incl. ApI, AS, DKR, Mod., PRI)	40,763	5.21	1
Mario Oliverio	490,229	61.41	1	The Left (incl. SEL, IdV, PCdI)	34,120	4.36	1
Mario Oliverio	490,229	61.41	1	Autonomy and Rights	29,312	3.75	–
Mario Oliverio	490,229	61.41	1	Democratic Centre	26,831	3.43	–
Mario Oliverio	490,229	61.41	1	New CDU	12,007	1.53	–
Mario Oliverio	490,229	61.41	1	Total	482,788	61.71	19
Wanda Ferro	188,288	23.59	–	Forza Italia	96,066	12.28	5
Wanda Ferro	188,288	23.59	–	House of Freedoms	67,189	8.59	3
Wanda Ferro	188,288	23.59	–	Brothers of Italy	19,353	2.47	–
Wanda Ferro	188,288	23.59	–	Total	182,608	23.34	8
Vincenzo D'Ascola	69,521	8.71	–	New Centre-Right	47,574	6.08	3
Vincenzo D'Ascola	69,521	8.71	–	Union of the Centre	21,020	2.69	–
Vincenzo D'Ascola	69,521	8.71	–	Total	68,594	8.77	3
Cono Cantelmi	39,658	4.97	–	Five Star Movement	38,345	4.90	–
Domenico Gattuso	10,567	1.32	–	The Other Calabria (incl. PRC)	10,062	1.29	–
Total candidates	798,263	100.00	1	Total parties	782,397	100.00	30
Source: Ministry of the Interior – Historical Archive of Elections

Popular vote
PD	23.67%
Oliverio	12.48%
FI	12.28%
CdL	8.59%
DP	7.28%
NCD	6.08%
CiR	5.21%
M5S	4.90%
SEL	4.36%
Others	15.15%

President
Oliverio	61.41%
Ferro	23.59%
D'Ascola	8.71%
Cantelmi	4.90%
Gattuso	1.32%
