= Antonino Spirlì =

Italian politician

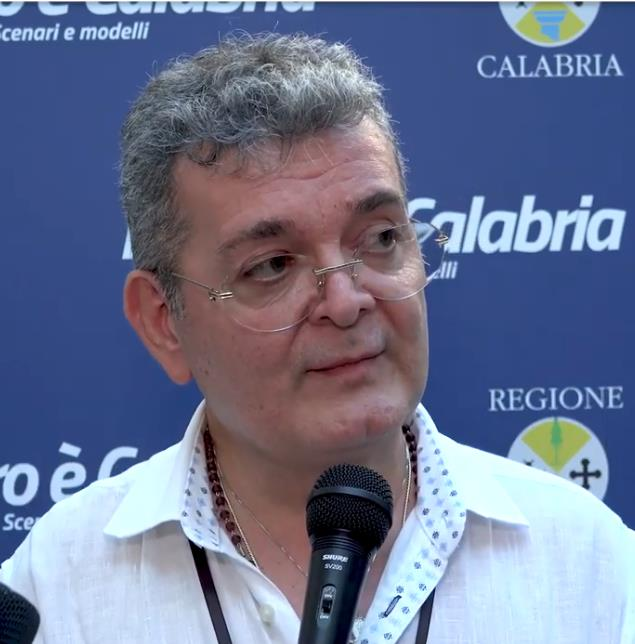

Acting President of Calabria
- In office 15 October 2020 – 29 October 2021
- Preceded by: Jole Santelli
- Succeeded by: Roberto Occhiuto

Vice President of Calabria
- In office 15 February 2020 – 15 October 2020
- President: Jole Santelli

Personal details
- Born: 13 July 1961 (age 64) Taurianova, Italy
- Party: MSI (until 1994); FI (1994–2009); PdL (2009–2013); FdI (2014–2017); League (since 2017)
- Occupation: Journalist, author, actor

Antonino “Nino” Spirlì (born 13 July 1961) is an Italian politician, author, actor and journalist. He became the acting president of Calabria region following the death of Jole Santelli on 15 October 2020. By law, a snap election must be held within 60 days, it did not happen because of the Covid pandemic.

== Biography ==
A former cavalry lieutenant, he also was an actor and a theatre director, before becoming a TV author. For Mediaset and RAI, he created formats like the La fattoria, the fiction Né con te né senza di te and the show Forum with Rita dalla Chiesa. Also a writer, Sprilì is one of the founders of Cultura Identità – a sovereignist think tank that supports the notion of national identities. He also contributed to il Giornale, il Giornale.it (where he had a regular column, "I pensieri di una vecchia checca"), il GiornaleOff, Il Garantista ("I corsivi della vecchia checca") and Corriere della Calabria ("Lo schiaffo") between October 2016 and April 2018. He also directed the Italian local television station Sud. In 2011 he published his first novel, Diario di una vecchia checca (Diary of an old Queer).

== Strait of Messina Bridge ==
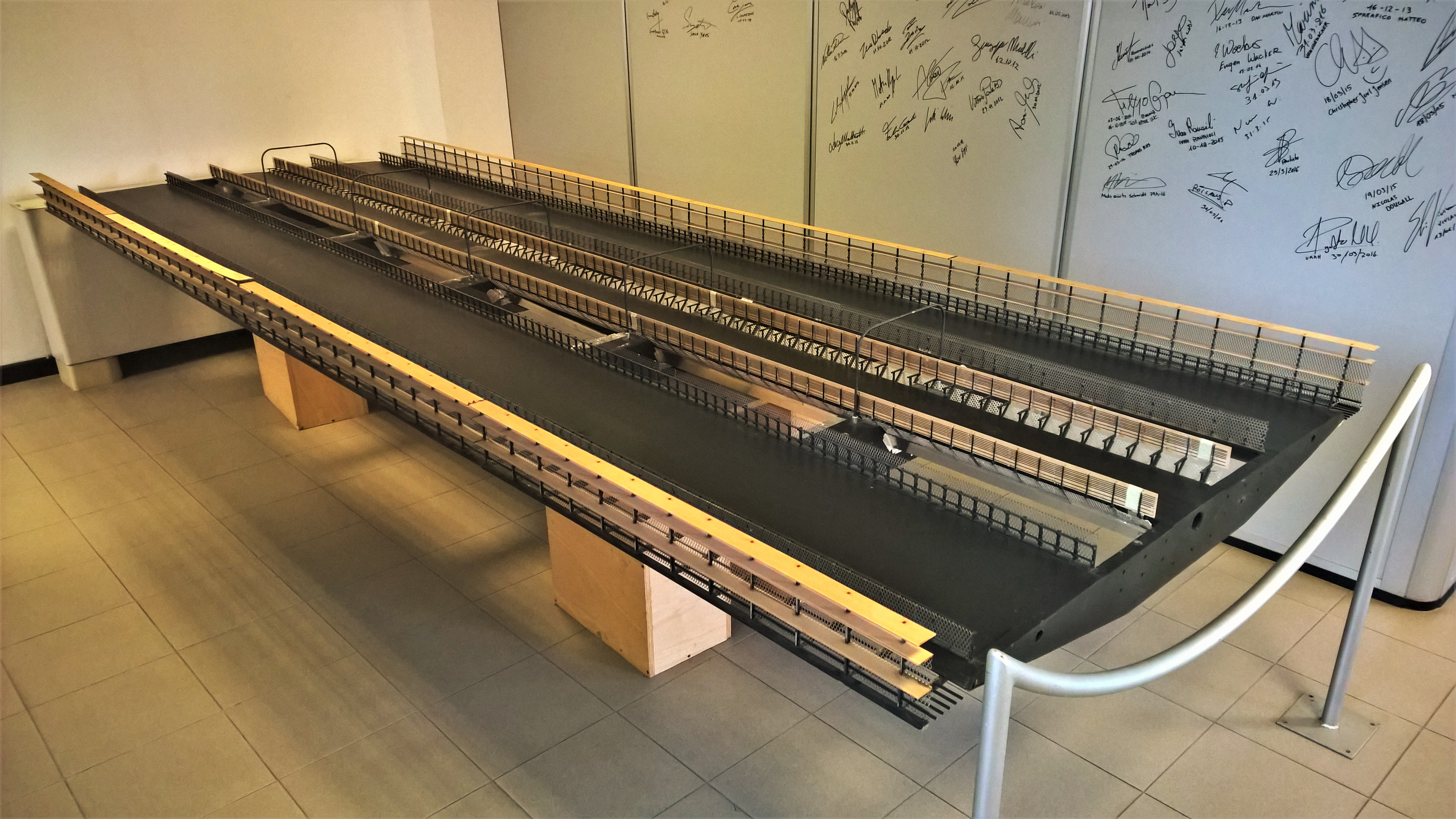
A section of the deck of the Messina Bridge.

On 22 April 2021 Spirlì participated with the CEO of Webuild, Pietro Salini, in Catania in a joint press conference with the President of the Sicilian Region Nello Musumeci and the expert of bridges the academic and engineer Enzo Siviero, announced that he was ready to build the Strait of Messina Bridge, starting immediately with the works and on the basis of the executive project and construction site approved definitively in 2013. He declared that he already had the 4 billion euro coverage necessary for the construction of the Work and that he could obtain the other two necessary for the infrastructures connected to it from private financing.
