= 1995 Calabrian regional election =

Italian regional election

- 23 April 1995
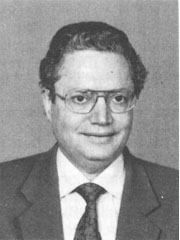

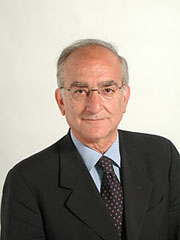
	Majority party	Minority party
Leader	Giuseppe Nisticò	Donato Tommaso Veraldi
Party	Forza Italia	Populars
Alliance	Centre-right	Centre-left
Seats won	25	13
Popular vote	456,545	392,227
Percentage	44.1%	37.9%
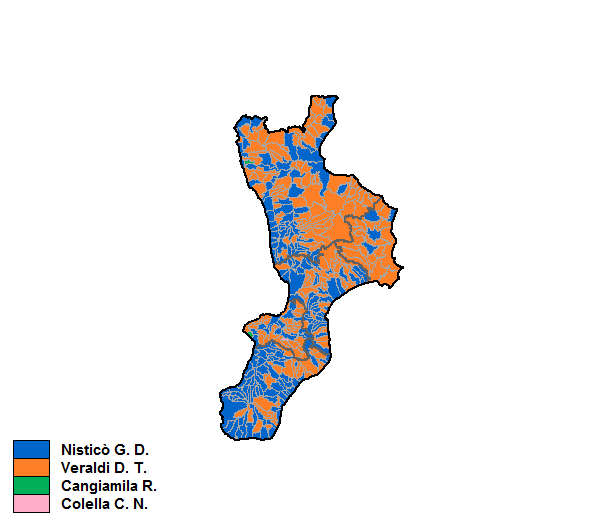
President before election
Donato Tommaso Veraldi
Italian People's Party
Subsequent President
Giuseppe Nisticò
Forza Italia

The 1995 Calabrian regional election took place on 23 April 1995.

Giuseppe Nisticò (Forza Italia) was elected President of the Region, defeating Donato Tommaso Veraldi (People's Party).

For the first time the President of the Region was directly elected by the people, although the election was not yet binding and the President-elect could have been replaced during the term. This is precisely what happened in 1998, when the centre-right decided to replace Nisticò with Battista Caligiuri, and again in 1999, when a centre-left majority supported by dissidents of the centre-right, who had formed the Democratic Union for the Republic, ousted Caligiuri and replaced him with Luigi Meduri of the Italian People's Party.

== Results ==
Candidates	votes	votes (%)	seats reg. list	seats prov. lists
Giuseppe Nisticò	456,545	44.06	8	17
Forza Italia – The People's Pole	182,127	19.67	→	8
National Alliance	151,234	16.33	→	6
Christian Democratic Centre	83,707	9.04	→	3
Donato Tommaso Veraldi	392,227	37.85	-	13
Progressives (PDS–FDV–FL)	205,734	22.22	→	8
Populars	92,728	10.01	→	3
Pact of Democrats	46,916	5.07	→	2
Federalist Italy League	4,173	0.45	→	-
Pasquino Crupi	98,742	9.53	-	3
Communist Refoundation Party	80,851	8.73	→	3
Roberto Cangiamila	35,610	3.44	-	1
Italian Republican Party	34,865	3.77	→	1
Carlo Colella	31,072	3.00	-	-
Italian Democratic Socialist Party	20,892	2.26	→	-
Reformist Socialist Party	9,081	0.98	→	-
Salvatore Paolillo	14,002	1.35	-	-
Tricolour Flame	8,609	0.93	→	-
Anna Maria Merlini	8,049	0.78	-	-
Pannella List	5,048	0.55	→	-
Total	1,036,247	100.00	8	34

Source: Ministry of the Interior
