= Rosario Olivo =

Italian politician (born 1940)

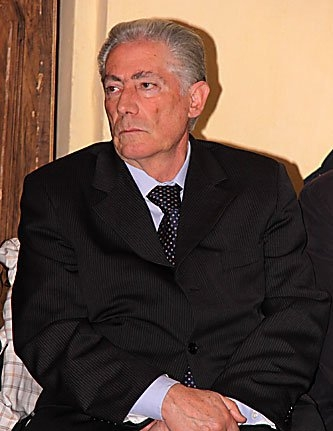

Mayor of Catanzaro
- In office 12 June 2006 – 16 May 2011
- Preceded by: Sergio Abramo
- Succeeded by: Michele Traversa

President of Calabria
- In office 30 December 1987 – 1 February 1992
- Preceded by: Francesco Principe
- Succeeded by: Guido Rhodio

Personal details
- Born: 18 April 1940 (age 85) Catanzaro, Italy
- Party: Democratic Party; Italian Socialist Party (previously)
- Occupation: Politician

Rosario Olivo (born 18 April 1940) is an Italian politician.

A long-time member of the Italian Socialist Party (PSI), he joined the Labour Federation (FL) in 1994 and the Democrats of the Left (DS) in 1998.

He was deputy from 1992 to 2001 and served as the President of Calabria from 1987 to 1992. In 2006, he was elected mayor of Catanzaro.

He is a Waldensian.
