= 2010 Calabrian regional election =

Italian regional election

- 28–29 March 2010
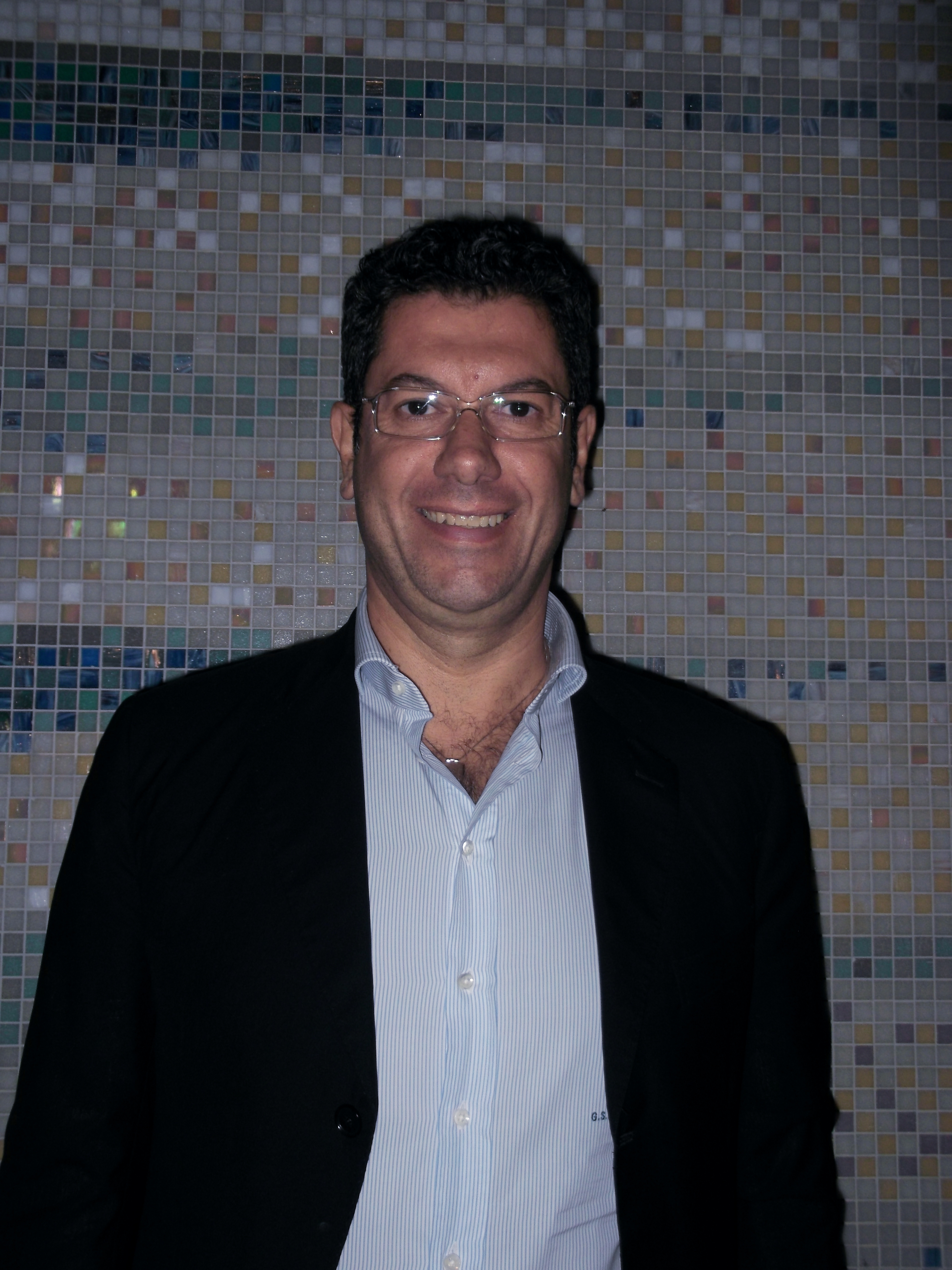

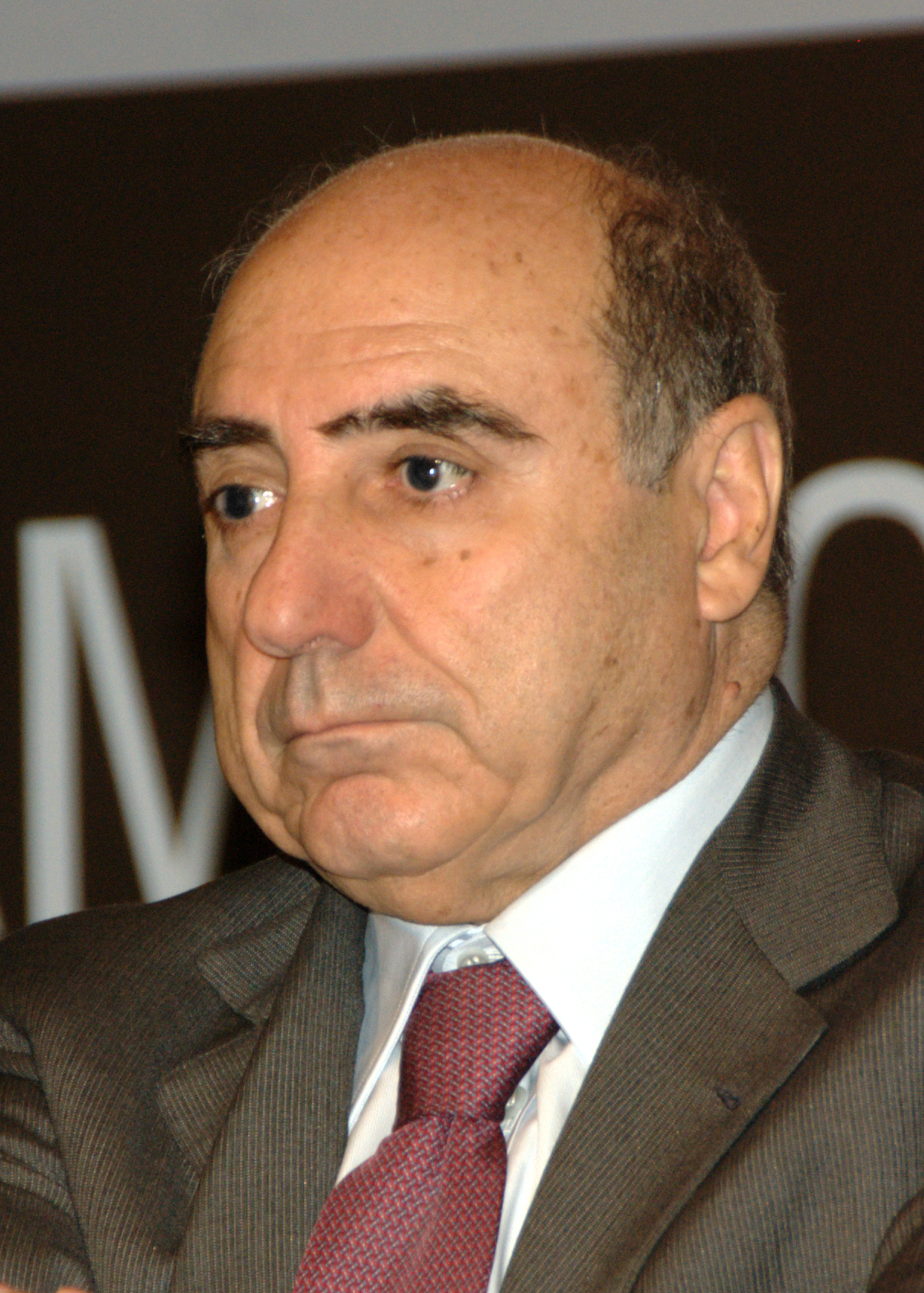

	Majority party	Minority party	Third party
Leader	Giuseppe Scopelliti	Agazio Loiero	Filippo Callipo
Party	People of Freedom	Democratic Party	Independent
Alliance	Centre-right	Centre-left	IdV–Others
Seats won	30	17	3
Seat change	▲10	▼13	new
Popular vote	614,584	342,773	106,646
Percentage	57.8%	32.2%	10.0%
Swing	▲18.1%	▼27.7%	new
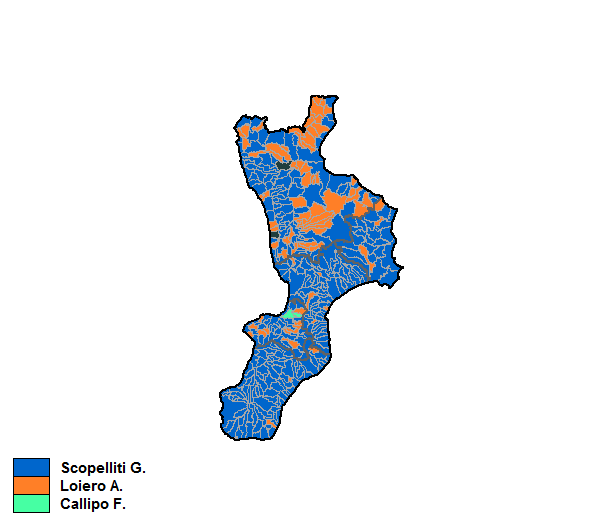
President before election
Agazio Loiero
The Daisy
Subsequent President
Giuseppe Scopelliti
The People of Freedom

The 2010 Calabrian regional election took place on 28–29 March 2010.

Giuseppe Scopelliti of The People of Freedom ousted by a landslide the incumbent President Agazio Loiero of the Democratic Party.

== Results ==
28–29 March 2010 Calabria regional election results
Candidates	Votes	%	Seats	Parties	Votes	%	Seats
Giuseppe Scopelliti	614,584	57.76	1	The People of Freedom	271,581	26.39	15
Giuseppe Scopelliti	614,584	57.76	1	Scopelliti for President	102,090	9.92	6
Giuseppe Scopelliti	614,584	57.76	1	Union of the Centre	97,213	9.44	6
Giuseppe Scopelliti	614,584	57.76	1	Together for Calabria (NPSI–UDEUR–PRI)	53,158	5.16	2
Giuseppe Scopelliti	614,584	57.76	1	United Socialists	33,000	3.21	–
Giuseppe Scopelliti	614,584	57.76	1	We the South	31,345	3.05	–
Giuseppe Scopelliti	614,584	57.76	1	Tricolour Flame	4,136	0.40	–
Giuseppe Scopelliti	614,584	57.76	1	Total	592,523	57.57	29
Agazio Loiero	342,773	32.22	1	Democratic Party	162,081	15.75	10
Agazio Loiero	342,773	32.22	1	Autonomy and Rights	71,945	6.99	4
Agazio Loiero	342,773	32.22	1	Federation of the Left	41,520	4.03	2
Agazio Loiero	342,773	32.22	1	PSI–Left with Vendola	38,581	3.75	–
Agazio Loiero	342,773	32.22	1	Alliance for Calabria	23,106	2.24	–
Agazio Loiero	342,773	32.22	1	Untie Calabria	21,145	2.05	–
Agazio Loiero	342,773	32.22	1	Total	358,378	34.82	16
Filippo Callipo	106,646	10.02	–	Italy of Values	55,370	5.38	3
Filippo Callipo	106,646	10.02	–	Io Resto in Calabria	20,443	1.99	–
Filippo Callipo	106,646	10.02	–	Bonino-Pannella List	2,551	0.25	–
Filippo Callipo	106,646	10.02	–	Total	78,364	7.61	3
Total candidates	1,064,003	100.00	2	Total parties	1,029,265	100.00	48
Source: Ministry of the Interior – Historical Archive of Elections

Popular vote
PdL	26.39%
PD	15.75%
Scopelliti	9.92%
UdC	9.44%
AeD	6.99%
IdV	5.38%
Together	5.16%
FdS	4.03%
PSI–SEL	3.75%
Others	13.19%

President
Scopelliti	57.76%
Loiero	32.22%
Callipo	10.02%
