= Giuseppe Scopelliti =

Italian politician (born 1966)

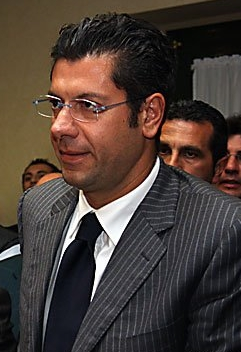

President of Calabria
- In office 12 April 2010 – 29 May 2014
- Preceded by: Agazio Loiero
- Succeeded by: Mario Oliverio

Mayor of Reggio Calabria
- In office 28 May 2002 – 14 May 2010
- Preceded by: Italo Falcomatà
- Succeeded by: Demetrio Arena

Personal details
- Born: 21 November 1966 (age 59) Reggio Calabria, Italy
- Party: MSI (1988-1995); AN (1995-2009); PdL (2009-2013); NCD (2013-2014); AzN (2015-2017); MNS (2017-2019)
- Education: University of Messina

Giuseppe Scopelliti (born 21 November 1966 in Reggio Calabria, Italy) is an Italian politician.

== Mayor of Reggio Calabria ==
He was elected Mayor of Reggio Calabria in 2002. According to investigations of anti-mafia investigators in 2016, Scopelliti was elected thanks to votes from the 'Ndrangheta, a Mafia-type criminal organisation in Calabria.

On 9 October 2012, the Italian government decided to dissolve the city council of Reggio Calabria for infiltration by the 'Ndrangheta. The move came after some councillors were suspected of having ties to the powerful crime syndicate, under the 10-year centre-right rule of Giuseppe Scopelliti, mayor from 2002 to 2010. The investigation was launched in June 2011, following the suicide of Orsola Fallara, Reggio Calabria's council financial controller, who had resigned after government inspectors discovered a €170 million deficit in the Reggio's coffers.

== President of Calabria ==
Scopelliti was elected President of Calabria in the 2010 Calabrian regional election, ousting his predecessor, incumbent President Agazio Loiero of the Democratic Party, in a landslide. He took 57.8% of the vote, while Loiero lost re-election with 32.2%. Scopelliti took office as President on 30 March 2010.

== Prison sentence ==
He was sentenced to six years in prison, a 120,000-euro fine, and permanently banned from public office on 28 March 2014. Scopelliti was found guilty of abuse of office and misinformation while serving as mayor of Reggio Calabria (2002–2010). He resigned as President of Calabria on 29 April 2014.
