= 1990 Calabrian regional election =

Election in Italy

The 1990 Calabrian regional election took place on 6 and 7 May 1990.

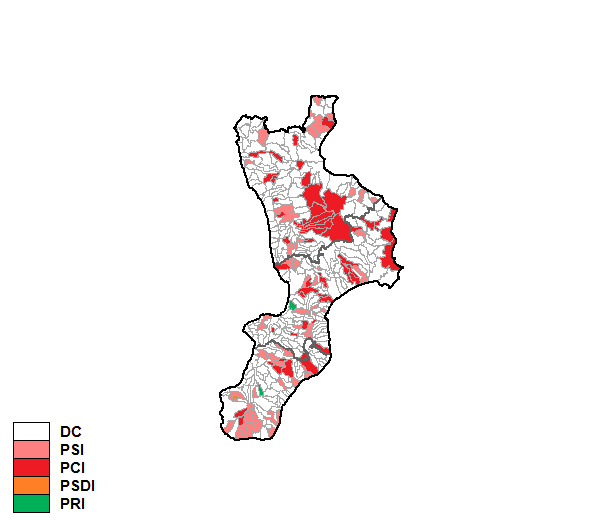
Largest party by municipality

== Events ==
Christian Democracy, which had been the leading political force in the region for twenty years, was the largest party, while the Italian Socialist Party, which controlled the post of President of the Region since 1980, made strong gains and came second at the expenses of the Italian Communist Party.

After the election, a new government composed of the Christian Democrats, the Socialists, the Italian Democratic Socialist Party and the Italian Republican Party was formed under the leadership of Rosario Olivo, the incumbent Socialist President (Organic Centre-left). A Christian Democrat, Rhodio, took the leadership in 1992.

== Results ==
Parties	votes	votes (%)	seats
Christian Democracy	451,337	38.2	16
Italian Socialist Party	263,807	22.3	9
Italian Communist Party	230,012	19.5	8
Italian Democratic Socialist Party	69,045	5.8	2
Italian Social Movement	50,605	4.3	2
Italian Republican Party	34,160	2.9	1
Italian Liberal Party	24,101	2.0	1
Proletarian Democracy	14,003	1.2	1
Hunting Fishing Environment	13,599	1.2	-
Green List	13,030	1.1	-
Rainbow Greens	13,030	0.9	-
Antiprohibitionists on Drugs	5,142	0.4	-
Southern League Calabria	2,928	0.3	-
Total	1,182,797	100.0	40

Source: Ministry of the Interior
