= Pasquale Tridico =

Italian politician

Pasquale Tridico MEP
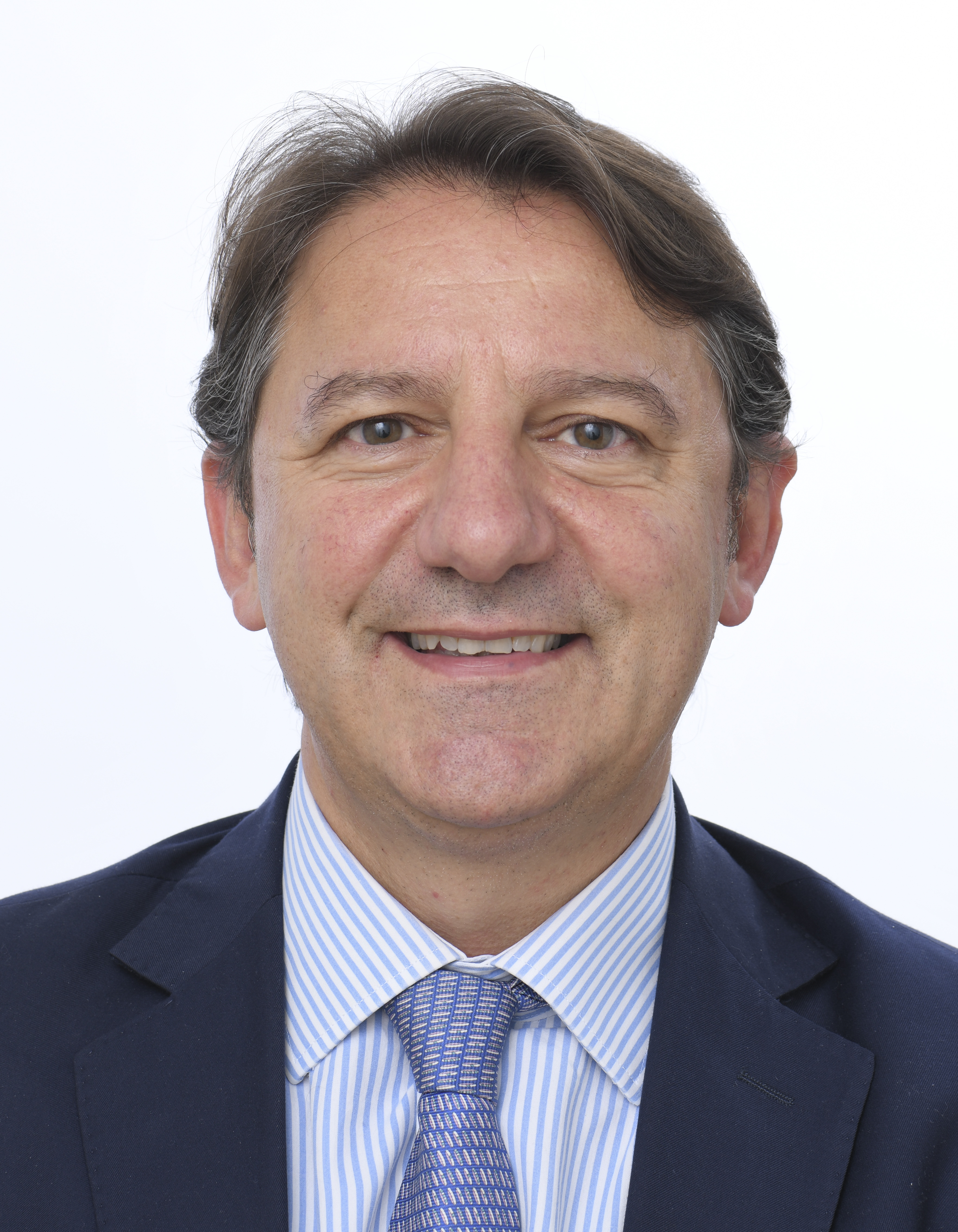
- Official portrait, 2024

Member of the European Parliament for Southern Italy
- Incumbent
- Assumed office 16 July 2024

President of the National Institute for Social Security
- In office 14 March 2019 – 23 May 2023
- Preceded by: Tito Boeri
- Succeeded by: Micaela Gelera

Personal details
- Born: 21 September 1975 (age 51) Scala Coeli, Italy
- Party: Five Star Movement
- Other political affiliations: The Left in the European Parliament – GUE/NGL
- Education: Sapienza University of Rome

Pasquale Tridico (born 21 September 1975) is an Italian economist and politician of the Five Star Movement (M5S). He was elected member of the European Parliament in 2024. He served as president of the National Institute for Social Security from 2019 to 2023.

== Career ==
Born in Scala Coeli, Calabria, he moved to Rome to pursue his graduate studies. He graduated in Economics at Università di Roma La Sapienza in 2000 and obtained his PhD at Roma Tre University in 2004. Tridico is a professor at the Roma Tre University department of economics, and has served as secretary-general of the European Association for Evolutionary Political Economy since 2012. Ahead of the 2018 general election, he was M5S leader Luigi Di Maio's candidate for minister of labour. He was instead appointed president of the National Institute for Social Security, serving from 2019 to 2023. For the 2024 European Parliament election, Tridico was selected as the lead candidate of M5S in Southern Italy.
