= 1985 Calabrian regional election =

Italian regional election

The 1985 Calabrian regional election took place on 12 May 1985.

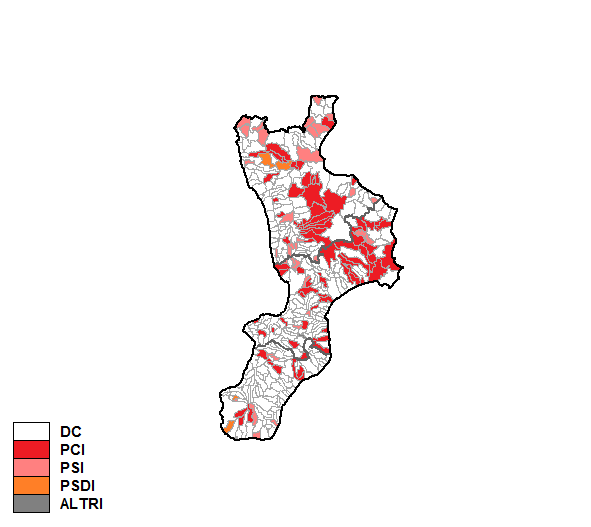
Largest party by municipality

== Events ==
Christian Democracy was by far the largest party, despite a moderate decline in term of votes, while the Italian Socialist Party made further gains. After the election Francesco Principe, a Socialist, was re-elected President of the Region at the head of a coalition comprising also the Italian Socialist Party, the Italian Democratic Socialist Party and the Italian Republican Party (Organic Centre-left). In 1987 Principe was replaced by Rosario Olivo.

== Results ==
| Parties | votes | votes (%) | seats |
|---|---|---|---|
| Christian Democracy | 462,298 | 39.0 | 16 |
| Italian Communist Party | 287,436 | 24.3 | 10 |
| Italian Socialist Party | 211,891 | 17.9 | 8 |
| Italian Social Movement | 75,624 | 6.4 | 2 |
| Italian Democratic Socialist Party | 67,228 | 5.7 | 2 |
| Italian Republican Party | 39,285 | 2.3 | 1 |
| Proletarian Democracy | 17,127 | 1.4 | 1 |
| Southern Movement | 11.930 | 1.0 | - |
| Italian Liberal Party | 8,225 | 0.7 | - |
| Pensioners' National Party | 2,886 | 0.2 | - |
| Pensioners Italian Alliance – Venetian League | 1,489 | 0.1 | - |
| Total | 1,185,419 | 100.0 | 40 |

Source: Ministry of the Interior
