= 1970 Calabrian regional election =

Election in Italy

The 1970 Calabrian regional election took place on 7–8 June 1970 in Calabria, Italy.

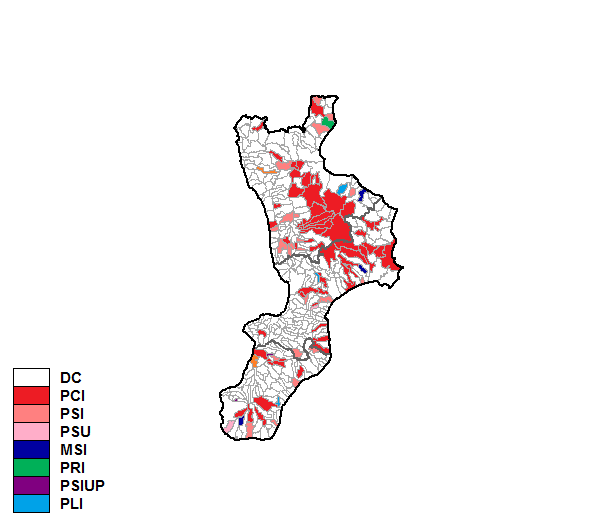
Largest party by municipality

== Events ==
Christian Democracy was by far the largest party and Christian Democrat Antonio Guarasci formed a government with the support of the Italian Socialist Party and the other minor centre-left parties (organic Centre-left). Guarasci was replaced by Aldo Ferrara in 1974.

== Results ==
Parties	votes	votes (%)	seats
Christian Democracy	374,215	39.7	17
Italian Communist Party	218,845	23.2	10
Italian Socialist Party	132,898	14.1	6
Italian Social Movement	59,607	6.3	2
Unitary Socialist Party	48,153	5.1	2
Italian Republican Party	38,812	4.1	1
Italian Socialist Party of Proletarian Unity	37,381	4.0	1
Italian Liberal Party	25,197	2.7	1
Italian Democratic Party of Monarchist Unity	4,067	0.4	-
Communist Party of Italy (Marxist–Leninist)	2,696	0.3	-
Total	941,871	100.0	40

Source: Ministry of the Interior
