= 1980 Calabrian regional election =

Italian regional election

The 1980 Calabrian regional election took place on 8 June 1980.

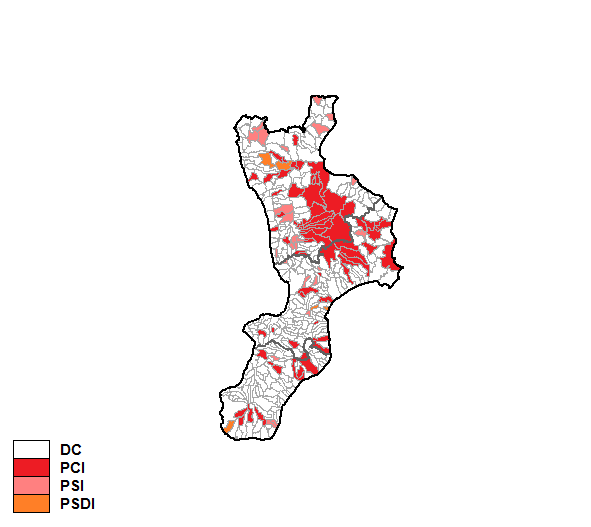
Largest party by municipality

== Events ==
Christian Democracy was by far the largest party, while the Italian Socialist Party made important gains. After the election Bruno Dominijanni, a Socialist, formed a centre-left government comprising Christian Democracy, the Italian Democratic Socialist Party and the Italian Republican Party (Organic Centre-left).

== Results ==
Parties	votes	votes (%)	seats
Christian Democracy	450,836	41.2	18
Italian Communist Party	263,869	24.2	10
Italian Socialist Party	181,114	16.6	7
Italian Social Movement	77,542	7.1	2
Italian Democratic Socialist Party	63,312	5.8	2
Italian Republican Party	22,977	2.1	1
Proletarian Unity Party	13,006	1.2	-
Proletarian Democracy	12,254	1.1	-
Italian Liberal Party	8,346	0.8	-
Total	1,093,256	100.0	40

Source: Ministry of the Interior
