= 2005 Calabrian regional election =

Italian regional election

- 3–4 April 2005
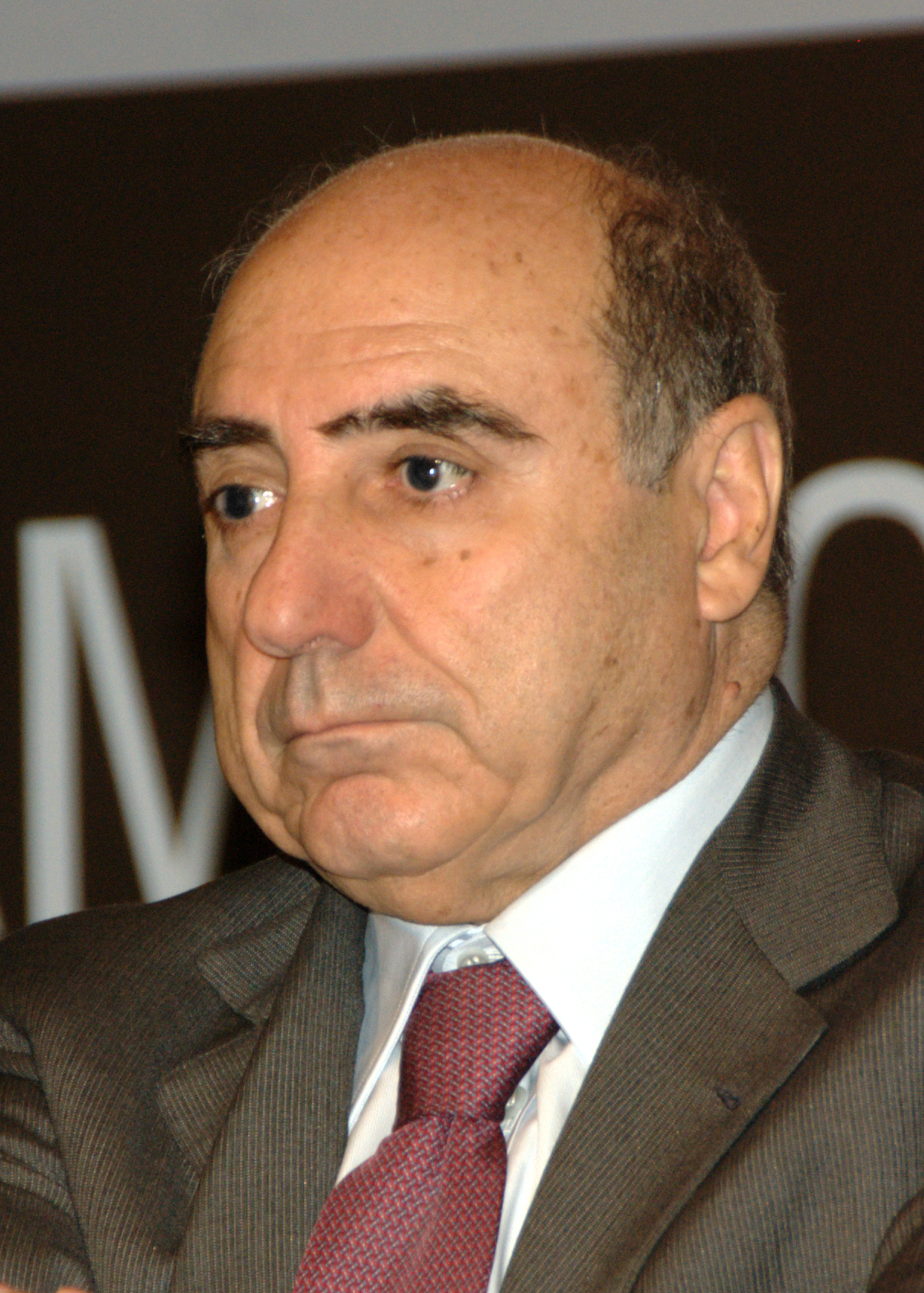

| | Majority party | Minority party |
|---|---|---|
| Leader | Agazio Loiero | Sergio Abramo |
| Party | The Daisy | Forza Italia |
| Alliance | The Union | House of Freedoms |
| Seats won | 30 | 20 |
| Seat change | ▲13 | ▼6 |
| Popular vote | 663,986 | 447,243 |
| Percentage | 59.9% | 39.7% |
| Swing | ▲11.2% | ▼10.2% |
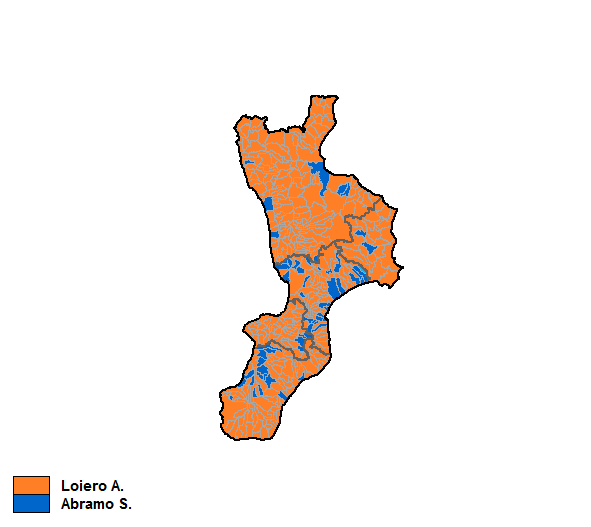
President before election
Giuseppe Chiaravalloti
Forza Italia
Subsequent President
Agazio Loiero
The Daisy

The 2005 Calabrian regional election took place on 3–4 April 2005.

Agazio Loiero (DL, The Union) was elected President of the Region by a landslide.

== Results ==
| Candidates and parties | votes | votes (%) | seats reg. list | seats prov. lists |
|---|---|---|---|---|
| Agazio Loiero | 663,986 | 58.95 | 5 | 25 |
| Democrats of the Left | 168,661 | 15.50 | → | 7 |
| Democracy is Freedom – The Daisy | 157,932 | 14.52 | → | 7 |
| UDEUR | 94,678 | 8.70 | → | 4 |
| Italian Democratic Socialists | 74,214 | 6.82 | → | 3 |
| Communist Refoundation Party | 56,099 | 5.16 | → | 2 |
| Party of Italian Communists–Italy of Values | 45,865 | 4.22 | → | 2 |
| Greens – PSDI – PLD | 34,208 | 3.14 | → | 0 |
| European Republicans Movement – others | 26,780 | 2.46 | → | 0 |
| Consumers' List | 1,738 | 0.16 | → | 0 |
| Sergio Abramo | 447,243 | 39.71 | 1 | 19 |
| Union of Christian and Centre Democrats | 113,052 | 10.39 | → | 6 |
| Forza Italia | 108,619 | 9.98 | → | 5 |
| National Alliance | 107,981 | 9.93 | → | 5 |
| Socialist Party – New PSI | 58,252 | 5.35 | → | 3 |
| PRI – PLI – others | 27,268 | 2.51 | → | 0 |
| Social Idea Movement | 4,285 | 0.39 | → | 0 |
| Fortunato Aloi | 12,538 | 1.11 | – | – |
| Social Alternative | 7,269 | 0.67 | → | 0 |
| Giuseppe Bilello | 2,583 | 0.23 | – | – |
| Christian Democracy | 924 | 0.08 | → | 0 |
| Total | 1,126,350 | 100.00 | 6 | 44 |

Source: Ministry of the Interior
