= Donato Tommaso Veraldi =

Italian politician (born 1941)

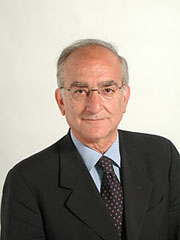
Donato Veraldi

Donato Tommaso Veraldi (born 12 January 1941, Soveria Simeri) is an Italian politician. He was a member of the European Parliament from 8 May 2006, when he took up a seat vacated after the 2006 Italian general election, until the 2009 European elections. He represented The Daisy within the ALDE parliamentary group.
