= Mario Oliverio =

Italian politician (born 1953)

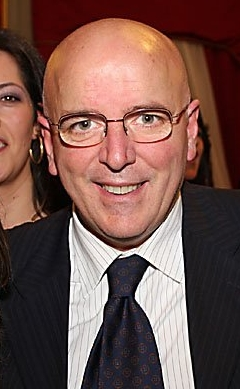

President of Calabria
- In office 9 December 2014 – 17 February 2020
- Preceded by: Giuseppe Scopelliti
- Succeeded by: Jole Santelli

President of the Province of Cosenza
- In office 13 June 2004 – 12 October 2014
- Preceded by: Antonio Acri
- Succeeded by: Mario Occhiuto

Member of the Chamber of Deputies
- In office 23 April 1992 – 27 April 2006

Personal details
- Born: 4 January 1953 (age 73) San Giovanni in Fiore, Italy
- Party: PCI (1980–1991); PDS (1991–1998); DS (1998–2007); PD (2007–2021)
- Profession: Politician

Mario Oliverio (born 4 January 1953 in San Giovanni in Fiore) is an Italian politician. From 2004 to 2012, he was president of the Province of Cosenza. He served as President of the Calabria region from 2014 to 2020. He is a member of the Democratic Party.

== Biography ==
In 1980, at the age of 27, Oliverio was elected regional councilor of Calabria on the PCI list. In 1985 he was re-elected member of the Regional Council and a year later he was appointed agriculture assessor of the first left-wing government in the Calabria region chaired by Francesco Principe. From 1990 to 1991 he served as mayor of San Giovanni in Fiore.

Oliverio was also elected MP in the 1992, 1994, 1996 and 2001 general elections. From 2004 to 2014 he has served as President of the Province of Cosenza. In 2014 he has been elected President of the Calabria region, with the 61.4% of the preferences.
