= 1975 Calabrian regional election =

Italian regional election

The 1975 Calabrian regional election took place on 15 June 1975.

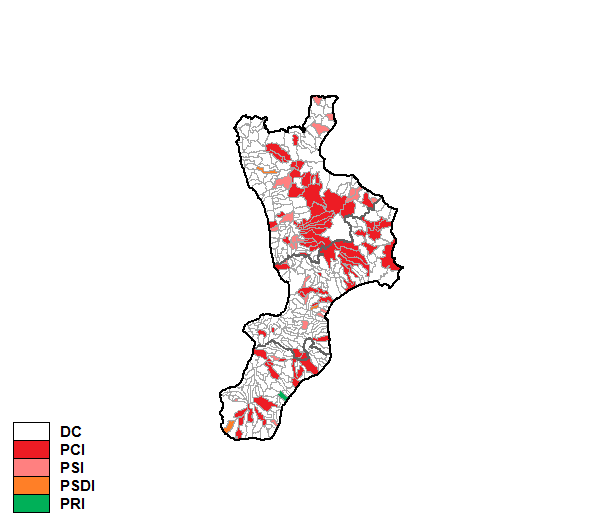
Largest party by municipality

== Events ==
Christian Democracy was by far the largest party and Christian Democrat Pasquale Perugini formed a government with the support of the Italian Socialist Party and the other minor centre-left parties (Organic Centre-left). Perugini was replaced by Aldo Ferrara in 1976.

== Results ==
Parties	votes	votes (%)	seats
Christian Democracy	424,076	39.5	17
Italian Communist Party	270,412	25.2	10
Italian Socialist Party	158,406	14.7	6
Italian Social Movement	89,286	8.3	3
Italian Democratic Socialist Party	56,364	5.3	2
Italian Republican Party	32,305	3.0	1
Proletarian Unity Party	29,423	2.7	1
Italian Liberal Party	14,081	1.3	-
Total	1,074,353	100.0	40

Source: Ministry of the Interior
