= Jole Santelli =

Italian politician (1968–2020)

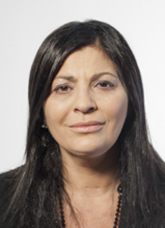

President of Calabria
- In office 15 February 2020 – 15 October 2020
- Preceded by: Mario Oliverio
- Succeeded by: Antonino Spirlì (acting)

Member of the Chamber of Deputies
- In office 30 May 2001 – 31 March 2020
- Constituency: Calabria

Personal details
- Born: 28 December 1968 Cosenza, Calabria, Italy
- Died: 15 October 2020 (aged 51) Cosenza, Calabria, Italy
- Party: Forza Italia (2013–2020)
- Other political affiliations: PSI (until 1994); FI (1994–2009); PdL (2009–2013)
- Education: Sapienza University of Rome
- Occupation: Lawyer

Jole Santelli (28 December 1968 – 15 October 2020) was an Italian politician. A member of Forza Italia, she was the President of Calabria from 15 February 2020 until her death eight months later.

== Biography ==
After graduating in Law at the Sapienza University of Rome, Santelli became a lawyer. She later joined Silvio Berlusconi's centre-right party, Forza Italia, and was elected to the Chamber of Deputies for the first time at the 2001 Italian general election.

From 2001 to 2006 Santelli was undersecretary at the Ministry of Justice in the Berlusconi II and the Berlusconi III cabinets. She was elected to the Chamber of Deputies again in the 2006, the 2008 and the 2013 general elections. From May to December 2013 Santelli was undersecretary at the Ministry of Labour in the Letta Cabinet, until Forza Italia withdrew its support from the government.

Since 2013 Santelli has been the regional coordinator of Forza Italia in Calabria and has been deputy mayor of Cosenza from 2016 to 2019. In the 2018 general elections Santelli was elected one more time to the Chamber of Deputies. In December 2019 she became the centre-right candidate for President of Calabria at the 2020 Calabrian regional election, which she won with around 55% of votes.

=== Death ===
On 15 October 2020, Santelli was found dead at her home, aged 51, after suffering a heart attack and internal bleeding. She had also suffered from cancer.
