= 2000 Calabrian regional election =

Italian regional election

- 16 April 2000
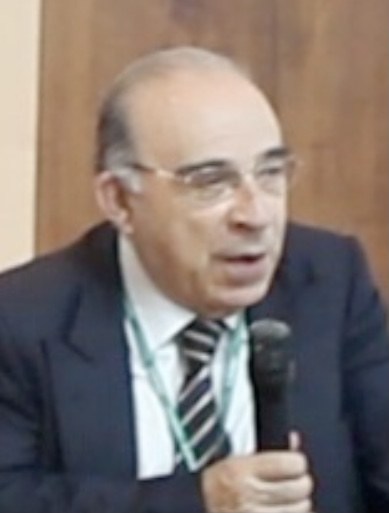

	Majority party	Minority party
Leader	Giuseppe Chiaravalloti	Antonino Fava
Party	Forza Italia	PPI
Alliance	Pole for Freedoms	The Olive Tree
Seats won	26	17
Seat change	Steady	▲1
Popular vote	545,186	532,222
Percentage	49.9%	48.7%
Swing	▲1.0%	▲1.3%
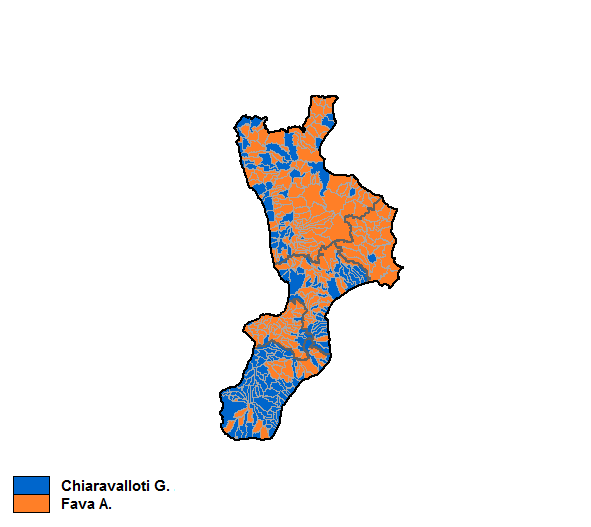
President before election
Luigi Meduri
Italian People's Party
Subsequent President
Giuseppe Chiaravalloti
Forza Italia

The 2000 Calabrian regional election took place in the Calabria region of Italy on 16 April 2000.

Giuseppe Chiaravalloti (Forza Italia) was narrowly elected President of the Region.

== Results ==
Coalitions and parties	votes	votes (%)	seats reg. list	seats prov. lists
Giuseppe Chiaravalloti	545,186	49.85	8	18
Forza Italia	194,295	18.25	→	7
National Alliance	110,478	10.38	→	4
Christian Democratic Centre	71,957	6.76	→	3
United Christian Democrats	68,955	6.48	→	2
Socialist Party	29,206	2.74	→	1
The Liberals Sgarbi	15,689	1.47	→	1
Tricolour Flame	15,166	1.42	→	-
Segni Pact	14,489	1.36	→	-
Italian Republican Party – Popular Centre	12,840	1.21	→	-
Nuccio Fava	532,222	48.66	1	16
Democrats of the Left	152,085	14.28	→	5
Italian People's Party	83,277	7.82	→	3
Union of Democrats for Europe	66,152	6.21	→	2
Italian Democratic Socialists	64,385	6.05	→	2
The Democrats	44,562	4.19	→	1
Party of Italian Communists	32,700	3.07	→	1
Communist Refoundation Party	31,515	2.96	→	1
Federation of the Greens	16,732	1.57	→	1
Mancini List – Southern Movement	15,801	1.48	→	-
Italian Renewal	14,713	1.38	→	-
Francesco Saverio Corbelli	9,840	0.90	-	-
Civil Rights	4,941	0.46	→	-
Antonio Marzano	6,413	0.59	-	-
Bonino List	4,808	0.45	→	-
Total	1,093,661	100.00	9	34

Source: Ministry of the Interior
