= Betty Davies (radio) =

British radio drama producer and director (1917–2018)

- Born: Elizabeth Gwladys Davies; 24 February 1917; Aberystwyth, Wales, United Kingdom of Great Britain and Ireland
- Died: 27 January 2018 (aged 100); Staunton, near Coleford, Gloucestershire, England, United Kingdom
- Education: University College London
- Occupations: Dramatist, director and radio producer

Elizabeth Gwladys Davies (24 February 1917 – 27 January 2018) was a British radio drama producer and director, and a prolific dramatist who contributed scripts to radio, primarily at the BBC, for more than fifty years. Her work appeared on the BBC Home Service and radio For the Forces during the Second World War and continued to appear on BBC Radio 4 well into the 1990s. As a director of drama, she produced the long-running radio soap opera Mrs Dale's Diary and worked closely with writers ranging from the Trinidadian author Samuel Selvon to the historian Lady Antonia Fraser, while directing hundreds of plays and serials for the radio. Davies died at the age of 100.

== Life and works ==
Betty Davies was born in Aberystwyth, Wales, on 24 February 1917, towards the end of the First World War, to Esther née Warrington, who was Welsh, and Percy Davies, an English civil servant. Davies was an only child, although her mother was one of six daughters and a single son which provided Davies with a large family network of cousins which sustained her until her death. Davies and her parents moved to London after the war.

Davies prepared to fulfil her ambition of a BBC career by learning shorthand and typing, and by reading for an honours degree in English with subsidiary Latin at University College London. She joined the BBC in June 1939, as a secretary, and moved through the Corporation ranks, serving as secretary to the Presentation Manager for Outside Broadcasts and Presentations before becoming Research Assistant in the Analysis Section of the Listener Research Department by November 1946.

She had already established herself as a contributing writer to BBC programmes from 1943, in diverse offerings that demonstrated a light touch and included collaborations with musicians. With the band leader Miff Ferrie, later better known as the long-time producer and agent for the British comedian Tommy Cooper, she wrote the musical entertainment Blow Your Own Trumpet! which was first broadcast on the Home Service in 1944 and later shown on BBC Television in 1947.

Her early contributions to radio sometimes seemed to develop a theme: For the magazine programme Divertissement transmitted on For the Forces in 1943, she wrote The Telephone, a 'story with a surprise by Betty Davies'. In 1959, when she was preoccupied as "main producer" of Mrs Dale's Diary, she wrote and produced The Telephone Call for the Home Service. Her 1945 play Best Seller, originally produced for the Home Service by the actor and director Hugh Stewart, was remade for the Home Service in 1961 by David Geary.

Davies also wrote for Children's Hour, with plays such as The Conjuror's Rabbit, broadcast twice in 1946, and again in 1949 – a recording is preserved in the British Library Sound Archive – and The Silver Flame, with music by Alan Paul, broadcast in 1951.

In the course of her career, Davies was involved in well over 1,300 BBC productions as identifiable in the BBC's searchable database, BBC Genome. While the site lists more than 2,000 productions, some include contributors with similar names, including the actor Betty Ann Davies, and many of Davies's productions did not list the producer in the Radio Times, the main source for BBC Genome.

== Just the Job for Jones ==
Among the many young women who brought new energy and ideas to BBC radio during the war, starting careers in broadcasting that would endure for decades, Davies cut a highly unusual path in entertainment by taking, with the BBC's blessing, a two-hour musical comedy that satirized the BBC, set in the BBC's Broadcasting House, into London's West End.

Just the Job for Jones, with book and lyrics by Davies and music by her established radio collaborator Alan Paul, was a big enough event to attract senior BBC management and the theatrical press. Presented at the Fortune Theatre, with members of the corporation's theatrical society, Ariel, making up the company, it was nonetheless a full-scale spectacle, produced by two of the outstanding talents in BBC drama and comedy.

Audrey Cameron, a leading producer (and actor) in radio with hundreds of credits, was joined by Douglas Moodie, a producer of musicals and comedies who would go on to produce the BBC's television police classic Dixon of Dock Green, took charge of the production, and were to give Davies a free rein.

What set the show apart was the innovative way in which Davies interwove musical gags and jabs at the BBC culture with material inspired by her day job, working in Listener Research to compile confidential reports on listeners' and viewers' reactions to programmes. One of her lyrics, teasingly sung by a "listener", went: "I'm not a prude/but I think the Third's rude," poking fun at the young cultural network, the Third Programme. Sir William Halley, Director-General of the BBC, who had devised the network, was in the audience, with Lord Simon, chairman of the BBC, and his fellow governors.

The Third was not spared further attention – when a man turns up for a Third Programme interview he is, indicatively, bearded and in sandals; a spiv selling mouth organs seeks out the distinguished chief conductor of The Proms Sir Malcolm Sargent. All of the corporation's bandwidths would receive attention.

Clifford Davis, writing in the Daily Mirror – "A girl takes the mike out of the BBC" – described Davies as a "slim dark-haired B.B.C. girl". He added:

Bachelor girl Betty wrote book and lyrics unaided in her Maida Vale flatlet. It took her two months work after her daily stint in the Listeners' Research Department....

Does Betty take the mike out of the B.B.C.? Of course. How will Lord Simon, chairman of the Corporation, his fellow governors, Director General Sir William Haley, and other radio barons react?

"We shall have to wait and see," says Betty. "No one's vetted the script."

Making merry with the criticism of the BBC and setting the criticism to music, did not set Davies back in her career. A complaint about television's new intrusion into the home was sung:

We feel bewitched and bewildered
By acrobats thrown in your face.
A stomach's all right, but X-rayed in the light
It really looks quite out of place.

According to The Stage, Britain's theatre journal of record, it was "extremely enjoyable". It also signalled the end of her research into the audience, and to her move to drama full-time.

== Mrs Dale's Diary ==
By the time Davies became assistant producer on Mrs Dale's Diary, in June 1953, the BBC's first long-running serial drama had been airing for over five years, since January 1948. Each weekday a new episode was broadcast, introduced by the title character, Mrs Dale, with a new diary entry on the latest domestic crisis. Initially a feminine perspective on Britain's middle-class suburban family in a nation recovering from war and austerity, it was required listening for many. According to The Daily Telegraph, Queen Elizabeth the Queen Mother said about the programme: "It is the only way of knowing what goes on in a middle-class family."

Mrs Dale's Diary had been due for a makeover when Davies joined the programme in 1953, and Davies was part of that refreshment. In a later, feminist, deconstruction of the programme in 2013, Kristen Skoog argued that the BBC's male culture took over the series. In her essay, "They're 'Doped' by that Dale Diary: Women's Serial Drama, the BBC and British Post-War Change", she wrote:

Being a domestic serial Mrs Dale's Diary was from its very inception categorized (and devalued) as popular feminized mass culture, mainly written by women for a female audience and therefore it was not admired among BBC producers. This had resulted in producers working on a rota or in the engagement of outside producers on an ad-hoc basis. This changed with ... Antony Kearey – an actor who had started to work on the serial as Assistant in the Drama Department Script Unit – and in June 1953 he was hired as the main producer for the serial. His appointment would guarantee greater editorial control and continuity. As main producer he was dedicated and keen to improve the serial. Already in April, he had [suggested] that a complete break with the current editorial policy was needed and that national events could be mentioned. Before Kearey's appointment it had also been confirmed that the serial was to be allocated not only a producer but also an assistant – Betty Davies, who took over as main producer when Kearey left in 1955 ...A few months into his new position, Kearey said that the main priority was to raise the level of scripts by better reflecting the life of a middle-class family in a London suburb: "greater research by scriptwriters into their material is necessary if the past 'vagueness' is to be overcome"....

Kearey's tenure was brief. By the time of Mrs Dale's 2,000th edition in November 1955, Davies was the main producer. Her extensive experience in research for the BBC and credits as a writer stood her in good stead on the programme, where she continued until 1962. Mrs Dale was then due her next makeover, which was to see the series become The Dales, while Davies would be taking up her influential role in the mainstream of radio drama.

Allen Andrews, writing in the Daily Herald, considered the programme and its audience at the time of that 2,000th edition, also talking to Davies for his article, The dream world of Mrs Dale. As the BBC Sound Archive retains only five of the more than five thousand editions, he also usefully captured the mood of the serial:

This week, in a church that does not exist, two people who do not exist either, were married.

And on Monday, millions of us will hear all about it when the harp strings are plucked to turn the 2,000th page of Mrs. Dale's Diary. At a reception given by the B.B.C. to celebrate the double occasion, the "bride,2 standing by a cardboard cake, wickedly observes that this is radio's first shotgun wedding.
For, in her private capacity as actress, Julia Braddock, she is expecting a baby in March.

This is the sort of remark that infuriates the fans, for it destroys the dream-world of Mrs. Dale. The doctor's wife is, the BBC claims, "part of the mythology of our island."...

Andrews took a sympathetic view of the programme and its audience – asking what it offered the "Dale day-dreamers" and declaring in one word: "FRIENDSHIP". "Mrs Dale", he wrote, "is our dream Mum." She is a nice, confident and competent woman, inhabiting a world where nothing ever happens to her – it happens to other people.

"Ask her pretty puppet-mistress, radio-producer Betty Davies," he adds. "All movements of the Dale marionettes suggested by the covey of script-writers must accord with Miss Davies' fundamental conception of Dale characteristics and BBC policy."

"The Dales", says Betty Davies, "are an idealised version of the middle-class, suburban professional family".

"They are improvements on reality. They are how we should like to see a family, more united than in actuality".

"And Mrs Dale is the rock, the stable MUM. Dreadful things happen to other people, but we can rely on Mrs Dale not to do anything wild or silly, or break down. SHE is our comfort and re-assurance".

Like the Queen representing all that is good in government, Andrews muses, people accept the myth of Mrs Dale because "it serves our purposes". "Mrs Dale, the tea-cup queen, stands for all that is nice about home-life."

Throughout the Davies years at Mrs Dale's Diary, Mrs Dale was played by Ellis Powell. In 2012, the actor Penelope Keith, a Mrs Dale fan herself and a serial star of television comedies, presented a programme for BBC Radio 4 called I'm Rather Worried about Jim, taking its title from what had become Mrs Dale's catch-phrase that regularly repeated in her opening diary entry. Jim Dale was her doctor husband. The programme analysed the appeal of Mrs Dale, and also looked at the real-life drama that ensued when the original Mrs Dale, Ellis Powell, was brutally replaced by the more glamorous Jessie Matthews; a drama that took place when Davies left the programme. Ellis Powell was to die three months after her departure from the Dales.

== Betty the Hat ==
In her transition from Mrs Dale to the radio drama mainstream, Davies continued to produce Mrs Dale while establishing herself as a producer of the popular Midweek Theatre plays for BBC Radio 2. Already known as a particularly stylish character while working on Mrs Dale – the hats that became her trademark set her apart from other producers and reflected her theatrical flair – she built up a reputation for her work with actors in an impressively wide range of work. Betty the Hat, as she was affectionately known throughout broadcasting for her invariably stylish headwear, was the director of choice for many writers. In The Independent obituary of the prolific and pioneering television dramatist Sheila Hodgson, Jack Adrian wrote of her radio work with Davies: "... in the main Hodgson aimed to quicken the pulse in as diverting a manner as possible, as in The Long Drive Home (1967; directed by the legendary Betty Davies), which featured a clever murder plot set in the world of golf-bores with a cast (Timothy West, William Fox, Peter Howell, the inimitable Rolf Lefebvre) you could only have afforded on the radio."

Many of the finest actors joined Davies's productions, but while making a mark in the classics and crime, she also developed a virtual Welsh repertory company with her promotion of Welsh writing, from established figures such as Emlyn Williams to the prolific actor and writer William Ingram, to the writer and actor Elizabeth Morgan. Sometimes she managed to combine the most illustrious of actors with the talents of her regular collaborators, as with her production of Emyln Williams' Night Must Fall, which starred Dame Sybil Thorndike opposite William Ingram, better known as the author of scores of radio plays, many produced by Davies. That production is retained in the British Library's Sound Archive.

Her collaborations with Elizabeth Morgan often reflected shared social concerns, as with her production of Morgan's According to the Regulations, about the 1911 rail strike when Llanelly, Wales, saw the arrival of the Worcestershire Regiment who shot dead two men, an event which the play commemorated. Another of Morgan's plays, It's Warm, and There's Company, was motivated by the situation in the 1970s which maintained that women who needed an operation that would render them sterile needed the consent of their husband or male partners, regardless of possible life-threatening complications. Morgan's play about women who found themselves in hospital featured a young actress, just down from Cambridge, Miriam Margolyes, who would become one of the most successful voice artists in the English-speaking world, playing a much older lady against established actresses such as Gudrun Ure, Morgan and Katherine Parr. Women listeners, in similar situations, deluged the BBC with letters and phone calls. Davies arranged several interviews on the corporations Woman's Hour programme. The law would change a few years later.

Women were to figure strongly in many of Davies's productions, as writers and leading actors. Her 1974 production of Lady Antonia Fraser's The Heroine, for instance, had the actress Maxine Audley in the lead, with a roster of leading women actors, including Patricia Quinn, Rosalind Shanks, Jane Wenham and Carole Boyd.

Martin Jarvis, the actor, director and renowned voice artist, worked with Davies in her last decade at Broadcasting House and stated that what he learned from her is still gratefully applied in his own audio productions. Writing of her at the time of the celebration of Davies's life at the BBC Club, he provided vivid images of the famous headwear: "In the years that I worked with her I never saw her bare-headed. Soft, velour, broad-brimmed, outlandishly wide, rakishly green, dazzlingly scarlet. All as glamorous as she appeared herself."

Jarvis also gave a strong sense of her studio presence as she sought to unleash the imagination of the actors: "She encouraged us to imagine the pain, the anxiety, the physicality. And then in her swooping, humorous, cultured vocal tones (reminiscent of the great Edith Evans but slightly more Welsh) she blurted, almost incongruously: 'Stick a pencil in your mouth, Martin dear, that'll tell the listeners!!' Yes, in a medium where words seem paramount, she knew its other great secret: how physical radio drama can be, at its best."

So indelible was Davies's studio presence that in 2019 her hats were part of a story on BBC Radio 4's Desert Island Discs: Dame Esther Rantzen, well known as a television presenter and notorious for an eight-year clandestine relationship with her married BBC boss Desmond Wilcox, rehearsed a story she had often used to explain her departure from radio drama: "But I got into making sound effect, so then a lady producer who always wore a hat, even in the studio, did a drama – I was in drama – where there was a distant skating accident, and I had to make the sound of a skating accident. I thought it would be skates falling on ice, she thought it would be flesh. So I had to fall over on a plank five times before I got the sound she accepted. And then I limped up to office and resigned in triplicate. But it was fun, actually; it was fun." It was also not the full story. It was not just the rigour and physicality of a Davies production that led to Rantzen's departure; Rantzen had already come to a parting of the way with the charismatic and highly regarded radio drama producer John Gibson. But Betty the Hat was still the story in the 21st century.

== Black Betty ==
By the 1960s, new voices were being heard in England, including newly arrived voices from the Caribbean, and Davies was consistent in her support of the diverse new talents emerging. So active was Davies in promoting Caribbean writers and actors that to some she became known as "Black Betty".

Between 1965's Lost Property and Zeppi's Machine on 26 February 1977 – two days after her official retirement from the BBC staff on 24 February – Davies produced no fewer than 15 plays by the Trinidadian novelist and playwright Samuel Selvon. Selvon, who also published as Sam Selvon, had confirmed his reputation with the 1956 novel The Lonely Londoners. He was among the first writers to present the emigrant experience of the "Windrush generation" of West Indians who found themselves looking for employment in the cold streets of London.

The Lonely Londoners was notable for its use of dialect both in the dialogue and narrative, and Selvon's characters were vividly distinct as they went about their day-to-day lives on the economic margins of London, telling stories and pursuing relationships with while women. He also took up the stories of Trinidad's Indo-Caribbean community.

His first novel, A Brighter Sun (1952), became Highway in the Sun in Davies' 1967 production for BBC Radio 4, and was to be the title of a collection of his radio plays by Peepal Tree Press, in 1991. Characters from his stories and novels came to life in his many radio drama and comedies.

Davies was not the only producer to work with Selvon at BBC radio, and Selvon was not the only Caribbean writer whose plays she produced. She worked with the Trinidadian author Mustapha Matura and Michael Abbensetts, a Guyana-born playwright. Davies would return to BBC radio to produce Abbensetts' The Sunny Side of the Street for 29 July 1977, after her retirement. (She continued to produce and direct plays for the BBC into the 1980s.)

The Caribbean writers provided good roles for actors and among the leading performers she worked with were Frank Singuineau, Mona Hammond, Rudolph Walker, Stefan Kalipha, Norman Beaton, Don Warrington, Tommy Eytle, Ram John Holder and the singer and actor Nadia Cattouse.

In 2005, Cattouse was interviewed for Stephen Bourne's book Black in the British Frame: The Black Experience in Film and Television and talked about radio. "There was John Gibson, a producer from Northern Ireland ... who did a lot of Caribbean plays ...then there was Betty Davies, who came in the wake of John Gibson. We understood some people in the BBC renamed her 'Black Betty' because she was always producing plays with black actors in the cast. If it wasn't for people like them we wouldn't have worked."

== Later life ==
Retirement at the age of 60, as the rules stood at the BBC in 1977, was somewhat notional for Davies. She continued to work as a writer and producer, providing scripts and productions for the BBC. She also produced for Capital Radio (Capital London) in the days when commercial radio was obliged to provide public service broadcasting. Awarded the "London General Entertainment" station, Capital maintained drama and dramatic readings. Martin Jarvis was among the voices she produced for Capital, while she also served as a judge on Capital's playwriting competition.

She also produced Jarvis in an unabridged reading of Charles Dickens' David Copperfield as an audiobook, a story she would later dramatise for the BBC The Personal History of David Copperfield as a Classic Serial which ran from September 1991, until November 1991 on Radio 4. Her dramatisation of An Imaginary Experience by Mary Wesley for Radio 4 in 1995 was among the last of her writing tasks.

She had been a traveller of the world throughout her career, but when she finally wound down from her work she continued to extend her travels. At the time of her death in 2018, David Roberts, the son of her first cousin, David Ceredig Roberts, wrote to Nigel Deacon's radio drama pages of his Diversity website to recount some of her travels: "while she was renowned for her globetrotting, from Antarctica to the Karakoram", he wrote, "nothing beats the time I bumped into her by accident in the countryside near Cienfuegos in Cuba. This was in 1983 - deep in the Cold War, when western tourists were rare. She really did get about!"

He added: "Until mid-2017, having outlived all her BBC contemporaries, she continued to live alone in the flat in Shepherd's Bush. Her longtime relationship with the Australian actor and writer Bruce Beeby had continued until his death in 2013."

Davies died just short of her 101st birthday on 27 January 2018, in Staunton, near Coleford, Gloucestershire, England.

== Radio plays written or produced by Betty Davies ==
Radio plays written or directed by Betty Davies
Date first broadcast	Play	Author	Cast	Synopsis Awards	Station Series
27 March 1943	The Telephone	Betty Davies	Marjorie Westbury	Part of Divertissement, Lunch-time entertainment, including 'Melody and Rhythm', with Marjorie Westbury, accompanied by Jack Wilson and Dorothy Parsons at two pianos. "The Telephone": story with a surprise by Betty Davies. Fred Adcock (rhythmic violin). Produced by Martyn C. Webster.	BBC Forces Programme
26 December 1943	Three Wishes	Betty Davies	Alan Howland, Gladys Spencer, Preston Lockwood, Marjorie Westbury, Frances Clare, Grizelda Hervey, Joan Carol, Philip Cunningham, Nancy Nevinson and John Blythe	A story with a moral, by Betty Davies. Produced by Martyn C. Webster	BBC Home Service Basic
30 August 1944	Blow Your Own Trumpet!	Written by Betty Davies. Music by Miff Ferrie.	Philip Cunningham, Carl Bernard, Doreen Season, Peter Cozens, Phoebe Hodgson, Clarence Wright, Alan Keith and Philip Wade.	The incredible story of Dick Cherrill. Produced by Eric Fawcett.	BBC Home Service Basic
13 February 1946	Winter Witchcraft	Betty Davies	Hugh Morton, Dick Francis, Tommy Brandon, Sally Rogers, John Boddington, Elizabeth London, Margaret Eaves, Bernard Hunter, Maurice Denham and Reginald Beckwith.	A fantastic comedy by Betty Davies, with music by John Burnaby. Produced by Gordon Crier. The augmented Dance Orchestra, conducted by Stanley Black	BBC Home Service Basic
14 October 1946	The Wishing Apple	Book and lyrics by Betty Davies, music by Alan Paul	Reggie Purdell, Jane Graham, Olivia Burleigh, John Stevens, Dick Francis, Wynne Ajello, Maurice Keary, Maudie Edwards, Gordon Crier and Charles Hawtrey.	A fantasy of the Golden Age before the laws of probability were invented. Revue Chorus and BBC Variety Orchestra, conducted by Rae Jenkins. Produced by Tom Ronald	BBC Home Service Basic
30 March 1951	The Silver Flame	Betty Davies with music by Alan Paul.	Diana Maddox, Vivienne Chatterton, John Blythe, Charles E Stidwill, Charles Leno, Carleton Hobbs, Andrew Churchman, Peter Claughton, Bay White, Sybil Arundale, Geoffrey Wincott and David Davis. Producer: Josephine Plummer.	This play has all the proper ingredient! of a fairy tale—the wicked Arabella, cook to the royal household and weaver of magic spells, a young and lovely princess who is turned into a silver flame, and a humble but handsome travelling jester who dares untold dangers to rescue her and to win her love.	BBC Home Service Basic Children's Hour
14 November 1955	Mrs Dale's Diary 2,000th episode	Jonquil Antony	Ellis Powell, James Dale, Leslie Heritage, Dorothy Lane and Thelma Hughes.	The 2,000th episode, with Ellis Powell as Mrs Dale and James Dale as Dr Dale. Produced by Betty Davies and John Hopkins.	BBC Light Programme
13 May 1959	The Telephone Call	Betty Davies	Eva Huszar, Peter Wilde, Gillian Maude, Malcolm Hayes and David March	Play by Betty Davies, produced by Betty Davies.	BBC Home Service
2 October 1961	Best Seller	Betty Davies	Denys Blakelock, Sheila Grant, Dorit Welles, Wensley Pithey, George Hagan, June Tobin, Nigel Anthony, James Grout, John Pullen and George Hagan.	A new book by Harold Furze is always an event. Not that you'd call him "popular" as he writes for the discriminating, pretty highbrow stuff. But as a name that spells prestige his publishers are justly proud of him. And, as it happens, his latest manuscript has just reached them. Produced by David Geary,	BBC Home Service
14 February 1966	This Little Piggy	William Ingram	Norman Wynne, Rachel Thomas, William Ingram, Aubrey Richards, Gareth Robinson, Talfryn Thomas, Olwen Brookes, Haydn Jones, Basil Jones, Gordon Davies, John Dillon, Windsor Davies, Sian Davies, Aubrey Richards, John Dearth and Dorothea Phillips	"It's more than man-power or tonnage they're dealing with, it's people. Those people, down there in that valley. And the only way of life they've ever known." Produced by Betty Davies.	BBC Home Service
9 October 1967	Highway in the Sun	Adapted by Samuel Selvon from his novel A Brighter Sun	Gordon Woolford, Barbara Assoon, Andrew Salkey, Nadia Cattouse, Burt Kwouk, Frank Singuineau, Harold Kasket, Rudolph Walker, Kenneth Herbert, Leroy Lingwood and Christopher Bidmead	A story set in Trinidad in the war years, directed by Betty Davies.	BBC Radio 4
15 November 1967	The Long Drive Home	Sheila Hodgson	William Fox, Peter Howell, Timothy West, Rolf Lefebvre, Annabel Maule, Alan Dudley, Nigel Clayton, David Brierley, Geoffrey Wincott and Ronald Herdman.	A clever murder plot set in the world of golf-bores. Produced by Betty Davies.	BBC Radio 2 Midweek Theatre
7 June 1969	Night Must Fall	Emlyn Williams, adapted by Peggy Wells	Sybil Thorndike, William Ingram, Madi Hedd, Fraser Kerr, Marjorie Westbury, Patricia Gallimore and John Gabriel.	Sybil Thorndike and William Ingram in a new production of Night Must Fall by Emlyn Williams with Madi Hedd: 'All the time the daylight's moving over the floor, and by the end of the sermon the air in the church is turning grey. And people isn' able to think of holy things anymore. Because they know that today will be the same as all the other days, and come to an end ... and it'll be night .... ' Produced and directed by Betty Davies.	BBC Radio 4 Saturday Night Theatre
10 February 1971	Philately Will Get You Nowhere	Andrew Sachs	Barbara Mitchell, Bunny May and Edward Kelsey	A farcical comedy for radio, directed by Betty Davies.	BBC Radio 4 Midweek Theatre
23 January 1974	The Short-Sighted Optimist	Hugh Steadman Williams	Wilfred Pickles, Betty Baskcomb, Godfrey Kenton, Peter Pacey, David Sinclair, Diana Bishop, Anthony Daniels, Sion Probert and Sam Dastor.	George Morris has stayed teaching at a northern grammar school beyond retirement age. His class see him as something of a joke, his wife thinks he is a failure; but both judgments are superficial, for George is a remarkable man. Play directed by Betty Davies.	BBC Radio 4 Afternoon Theatre
6 March 1974	It's Warm and There's Company	Elizabeth Morgan	Elizabeth Morgan, Terry Scully, Katherine Parr, Ann Jameson, Miriam Margolyes, Eva Stuart, Gudrun Ure, Sam Dastor, Sion Probert and Anthony Daniels	A warm and tender study of a group of women in hospital, and how they react to the place, and in particular to the fact that they are women. Produced by Betty Davies.	BBC Radio 4 Afternoon Theatre
19 August 1974	According to the Regulations	Elizabeth Morgan	Glyn Houston, Elizabeth Morgan, Douglas Blackwell, Jan Edwards, Lionel Bentley, Gerald James, Sion Probert, Anthony Hall, Christine Pollon, William Ingram, David Sinclair, David Timson, Vernon Joyner, Peter Pacey, Timothy Bateson, Hector Ross and Stephen Thorne.	Six days, that's all it took the Almighty to make this world of ours, and all the creatures therein. Nine months it takes to make a new human life - God's finest masterpiece. Nine seconds to take aim, and fire, and destroy that masterpiece ... Perhaps we'll learn one day. This play is based on events that actually took place in Llanelly in 1911, but the Welsh characters are fictitious. Violinist Lionel Bentley, Producer Betty Davies.	BBC Radio 4 The Monday Play
25 September 1974	Bang, Bang, You're Dead	The short story by Muriel Spark adapted for radio by Jill Hyem	Jill Bennett, Christine Finn, Betty Huntley-Wright, Elizabeth Morgan, Alan Dudley, David Timson, Grizelda Hervey, Hector Ross, Carole Boyd, John Rye and Sean Arnold.	When they were children, Sybil and Desirée had looked alike. As grown women there was still something - if you looked at Desirée quickly you might mistake her for Sybil. But only for a moment. They weren't really alike at all ... Play directed by Betty Davies.	BBC Radio 4 Midweek Theatre
8 March 1975	A Hero for Leanda	The novel by Andrew Garve dramatised by Eileen Cullen	T. P. McKenna, Maria Aitken and David March	A freak wind off the African coast wrecks Michael Conway's yacht and leaves him penniless, stranded in Ghana. He is offered a way out of his difficulties – a highly paid, dangerous challenge. Should he accept it? Time: the late 1950s. Play directed by Betty Davies.	BBC Radio 4 Saturday Night Theatre
5 May 1975	Play Mas	Mustapha Matura	Rudolph Walker, Stefan Kalipha, Mercia Mansfield, Norman Beaton, Michael Deacon, Elizabeth Morgan, Tommy Eytle, Mona Hammond, Frank Singuineau and Peter Whitman.	In Trinidad at carnival time the whole island abandons its private affairs to ' Play Mas ' with whole-hearted zest. Mustapha Matura's play. staged at the Royal Court Theatre in 1974, was praised in The Guardian as 'an endearing, intelligent comedy that manages to be both a celebration of the island's famous carnival spirit and a criticism of its devouring inclusiveness.' Produced by Betty Davies.	BBC Radio 4 The Monday Play
16 September 1975	Bandstand	Derek Raby	Cyril Cusack, Rosalind Adams, Carole Boyd, Norma Ronald, Madi Hedd, Anne Jameson and John Rye	He closed his eyes and let the sun fill his face. After lunch, they could take him to the bandstand. They could leave him there. He would just listen to the concert, just like the old days. He would like to see the bandstand again. Play directed by Betty Davies.	BBC Radio 3 Drama Now
24 January 1976	The Heroine	Antonia Fraser	Maxine Audley, Patricia Quinn, Rosalind Shanks, Jane Wenham, Gladys Spencer, Carole Boyd, Michael Shannon, Michael Deacon and Anthony Smee.	In 1644, in the English Civil War, the Countess of Derby held Lathom House for the King during a three months' siege, while her husband was away at the war. This play is based on that historic siege, and tells a story of heroism – of more than one kind. Play directed by Betty Davies.	BBC Radio 4 Saturday Night Theatre
25 May 1976	Laz	William Ingram	John Hurt, William Squire, William Ingram, Haydn Jones and Douglas Blackwell.	'And then you hears him say it... clear as a bell: "Proper little Laz, eh?"... and poor hurt Dai, recognising for the first time in those faces an expression which, even after all this time, he still never got round to putting a name to. The feeling that though they all should be glad and happy to have him back... he no longer has... "the right".' Produced and directed by Betty Davies.	BBC Radio 3 Drama Now
26 February 1977	Zeppi's Machine	Sam Selvon	Tommy Eytle, Nadia Cattouse, Gordon Woolford, Frank Singuineau, Valerie Murray, Clifton Jones and Walter Hall.	Zeppi's Machine by San Selvon with Tommy Eytle and Nadia Cattouse Zeppi – the great Zeppl – was a powerful obeah man in Trinidad, and the villagers of Tacarigua brought him all their problems. Bit by bit the modern world was changing their way of life – and one day Zeppi found that mechanisation was putting him out of business! But he was a resourceful old rogue, and he dealt with the situation in his own way. Produced and directed by Betty Davies.	BBC Radio 4 Thirty-Minute Theatre
29 July 1977	The Sunny Side of the Street	Michael Abbensetts	Don Warrington, Nicolette McKenzie, Mark Heath, Jason Rose, Willie Jonah, Clifton Jones, Joan-Ann Maynard and Isabelle Lucas	Quentin Williams, a young West Indian solicitor, has lived in London nearly all his life, and seems more English than the English. A broken love affair forces him to move house, and he discovers he has taken a room in a "black house", where all his neighbours are West Indian or African. Quentin has to discover for himself that "no man is an island", and to come to terms with his own identity. Play directed by Betty Davies.	BBC Radio 4 Afternoon Theatre
6 May 1980	Little Dorrit	The novel by Charles Dickens, dramatised in 10 episodes by Betty Davies	Bruce Purchase, Angela Pleasence, Daniel Massey, Peter Vaughan, Patrick Troughton, Avril Elgar, Pauline Letts, Michael Graham Cox, Philip Voss, Simon Cadell, Lolly Cockerell, David Sinclair, Peter Baldwin, Andrew Seear, Rowena Roberts, Madi Hedd, Sonia Fraser, Shona Morris, Graham Faulkner, Jenny Twigge, Alan Mason and Christopher Benjamin.	Episode 1: "The Father of the Marshalse". The Marshalsea prison was a close and confined prison for debtors. It was an oblong pile of barrack building, partitioned into squalid houses standing back to back; environed by a narrow paved yard, hemmed in by high walls, duly spiked at top. Directed by Jane Morgan.	BBC Radio 4
14 September 1991 – 16 November 1991	The Personal History of David Copperfield	Charles Dickens dramatised by Betty Davies.	Gary Cady, Miriam Margolyes, Nicholas Gatt, Susan Sheridan, John Moffatt, Auriol Smith, Maggie McCarthy, David Burke, Timothy Spall, Mary Wimbush, Andrew Wincott, Sebastian Brennan, Joanna Myers, Terence Edmond, Timothy Carlton, Nigel Carrington, Charles Millham, Barbara Atkinson, Ronald Herdman, Fraser Kerr, Neil Roberts and Richard Pearce.	A new 10-part dramatisation of the novel which Charles Dickens described as his "favourite child". Directed by Marilyn Imrie.	BBC Radio 4 Classic Serial
17 March 1994	The Vacillations of Poppy Carew	Mary Wesley dramatised by Betty Davies	Beatie Edney, Kate Maravan, James Fleet, David Sinclair, Rachel Atkins, Andrew Wincott, Neville Jason and John Evitts.	Part 1 of 6: Discarded! Deserted! Poppy can't see any hope for the future when her boyfriend ditches her, but other possible lovers pop up in the most unlikely places – even in a funeral parlour! Directed by Jane Morgan.	BBC Radio 4
