= Aiello =

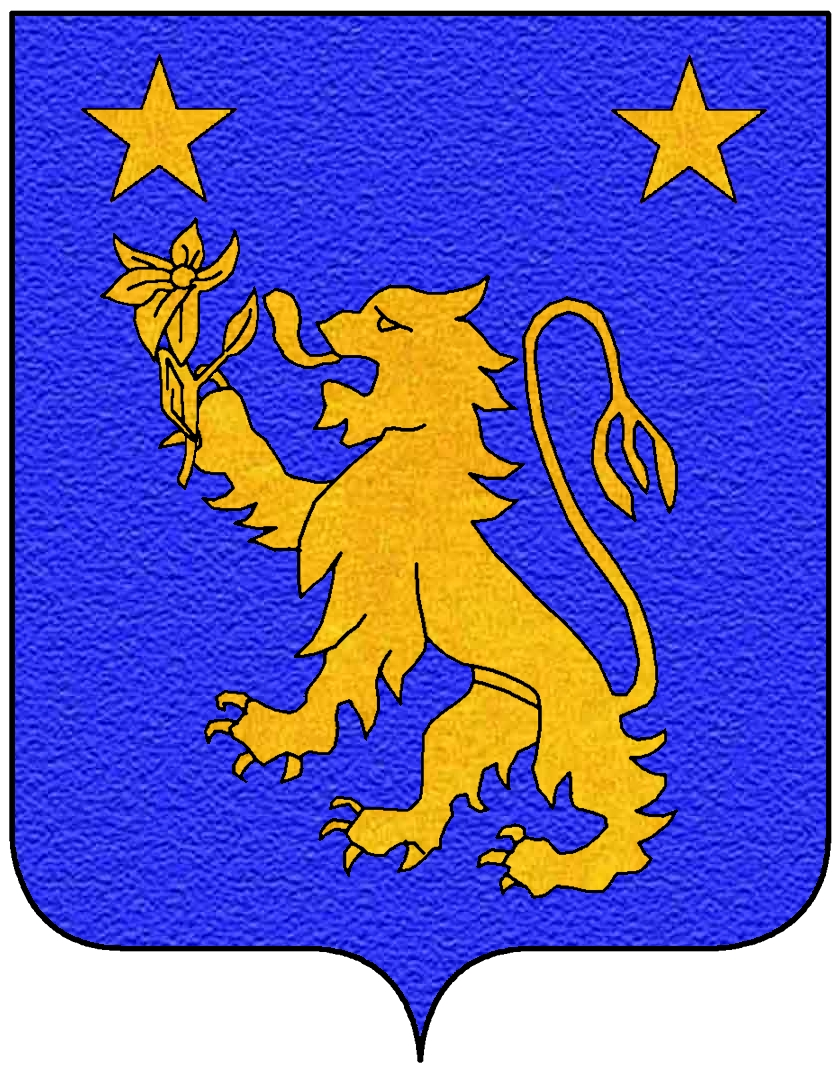
- Coat of arms of D'Aiello family
- Pronunciation: Italian: [aˈjɛllo] Neapolitan: [aˈjello]
- Language: Latin

Origin
- Meaning: derived from Latin agellus, a diminutive of Latin ager, "field", "smallholding"
- Region of origin: Southern Italy

Other names
- Alternative spelling: Ajello; D'Ajello
- Variant form: D'Aiello
- Related names: D'Azeglio; Gelli

Aiello (or Ajello) is a surname of Italian origin. People with the name include:

- Annette Aiello (born 1941), American zoologist and botanical entomologist
- Antonio Aiello (born 1985), Italian singer
- Barbara Aiello, Italian rabbi; first female rabbi in Italy
- Beatrice Aiello, Italian actress and artist
- Carl R. Ajello (1932–2025), Attorney General of Connecticut
- Cedric Aiello, French DJ of mixed Italian-Algerian origin
- Danny Aiello (1933–2019), American actor
- Danny Aiello III (1957–2010), American stunt man and film actor; son of Danny Aiello
- Edith Ajello (born 1944), American politician
- Elena Aiello (1895–1961), Italian Roman Catholic nun
- Francesco de Aiello (died 1453), Roman Catholic Archbishop of Bari-Canosa, of Todi and Bishop of Cava de' Tirreni
- Gaetan Ajello (1883–1983), Italian-born American architect
- Gianni Aiello, bassist and vocalist of the American rock music group Naked Giants
- Giovanni d'Aiello (died 1169), Roman Catholic Bishop of Catania
- Joe Aiello (1891–1930), American Prohibition mobster who feuded with Al Capone
- John of Ajello (died 1169), Italian Roman Catholic Bishop
- Josie Aiello, American singer-songwriter
- Laurent Aïello (born 1969), French race car driver
- Leslie C. Aiello (born 1946), American paleoanthropologist and academic
- Luigia Carlucci Aiello (born 1946), Italian computer scientist
- Matthew of Ajello (died 1193). Sicilian chancellor
- Nicholas of Ajello (died 1221), Italian Roman Catholic archbishop
- Piero Aiello (born 1956), Italian politician
- Piera Aiello (born 1967), Italian police informant and politician
- Renato D'Aiello (born 1959), Italian saxophonist resident in London
- Rosaria Aiello (born 1989), Italian water polo player
- Stevie Aiello (born 1983), American songwriter, musician, and record producer
- Tony Aiello (1921–2012), American football player
- Tony Aiello (born 1963), American television reporter in New York City
- Vincenzo Ajello, Master of the Order of Preachers from 184 until 1850, commenter of St. Thomas Aquinas
- Wynne Ajello (1903–1992), English soprano singer
