= Box for One =

Television play

Box for One is a live television play which has been presented three times, twice on British broadcaster BBC and once on Australian broadcaster ABC. It is a drama about 'spiv', and the entire 30-minute drama takes place in a London telephone box. It was written by Peter Brook.

== Premise ==
A London 'spiv' enters an outdoor telephone booth. He dials a number and asks if there is a message for him. As then goes to leave and the phone rings – it is a girl who is trying to find her boyfriend and has the wrong number. The spiv is on the run and is looking for help. He tries various people, but they reject him.

== 1949 version ==
The 1949 version aired on BBC, and starring Marius Goring, Ivan Craig and Josée Richard. Broadcast live, it was likely never telerecorded, and is lost.

== 1953 version ==
The 1953 version also aired on the BBC, and was an episode of Wednesday Theatre. It featured Robert Helpmann and Harold Lang. This version is likely lost, as the BBC rarely telerecorded shows during 1953.

== 1954 version ==
The play appears to have been filmed again in 1954 with Richard Attenborough and Sid James.

== 1958 Australian TV version ==
Box for One
- Written by: Peter Brook
- Directed by: William Sterling
- Starring: Robert Helpmann
- Country of origin: Australia
- Original language: English

Production
- Running time: 30 mins
- Production company: ABC

Original release
- Network: ABV-2
- Release: 17 August 1958 (Melbourne, live)
- Release: 24 September 1958 (Sydney, taped)

The play had reportedly been written specifically for Robert Helpmann, who was an Australian living in London. Helpmann returned to Australia in 1958 to star in and direct a stage production of Noël Coward's Nude with Violin. In May 1958 Helpmann expressed an interest in appearing in the play on Australian television. "I'm mad about TV", he said.

While performing in Nude with Violin in Melbourne, Helpmann appeared in a production of Box for One on Australian broadcaster ABC. It aired live on ABC's Melbourne station ABV-2. A telerecording (also known as a kinescope) was made and shown in Sydney on station ABN-2. It is not known if the kinescope recording still exists.

The ABC had just presented a one-woman play, a version of Sorry, Wrong Number (1958).

It was one of several thrillers filmed in the early days of Australian television.

=== Reception ===
The Australian Women's Weekly TV critic called it "Sorry, Wrong Number written for men. I thought it wasn't as good a play, nor as well done as Sorry, Wrong Number done by Channel 2 several months ago."

Helpmann reprised a section from the play in Half an Hour with Robert Helpmann (1964).

== See also ==
- Ending It - 1939 BBC TV play which also saw an Australian version.
- Miss Mabel - Stage play which saw both versions in both the UK and Australia
- Black Limelight - Stage play which saw versions in both the UK and Australia
- List of live television plays broadcast on Australian Broadcasting Corporation (1950s)
