= Aiello (disambiguation) =

Aiello is a surname of Italian origin.

Aiello or Ajello may also refer to:

== Places of Italy ==
=== Municipalities (comuni) ===
- Aiello Calabro, in the Province of Cosenza
- Aiello del Friuli, in the Province of Udine
- Aiello del Sabato, in the Province of Avellino
- Serra d'Aiello, a town and comune in the province of Cosenza

=== Civil parishes (frazioni) ===
- Aiello, in the municipality of Baronissi (SA)
- Aiello, in the municipality of Castel San Giorgio (SA)
- Aiello, in the municipality of Crognaleto (TE)

== Other uses ==
- Aiello (singer)
- Mr. Aiello, a 1998 Canadian drama film directed by Paul Tana
- Aiello (company), a smart speaker manufacturer

== See also ==
- Aielli, in the Province of L'Aquila in the Abruzzo region of Italy
