= Journey into Space =

British radio sci-fi programme (1953–1958)

Journey Into Space
- The four main cast members of Journey Into Space: The World in Peril
- Genre: Science fiction
- Running time: 30 minutes
- Country of origin: United Kingdom
- Language: English
- Home station: BBC Light Programme
- Syndicates: BBC Radio 4 Extra
- Starring: Andrew Faulds; Guy Kingsley Poynter; Bruce Beeby; Don Sharp; David Williams; David Kossoff; Alfie Bass; Deryck Gyler; David Jacobs (plus others)
- Created by: Charles Chilton
- Produced by: Charles Chilton
- Original release: 21 September 1953 – 18 June 1958
- No. of episodes: Journey to the Moon – 18; The Red Planet – 20; The World in Peril – 20; Operation Luna – 13; The Return from Mars – 1
- Audio format: Monaural
- Website: www.bbc.co.uk/programmes/b00clkyv

Journey Into Space is a BBC Radio science fiction programme written by BBC producer Charles Chilton. It was the last UK radio programme to attract a bigger evening audience than television. Originally, four series were produced (the fourth was a remake of the first), which were translated into 17 languages (including Hindi, Turkish and Dutch) and broadcast in countries worldwide (including Australia, the Netherlands, New Zealand and The United States). Chilton later wrote three best-selling novels and several comic strip stories based upon the radio series.

The first series was created in 1953, soon after Riders of the Range (a popular Western, also written by Chilton) ended its six series on the BBC Light Programme. Michael Standing, then Head of the BBC Variety Department, asked Chilton if he could write a sci-fi programme, and Journey to the Moon (later known as Operation Luna) was the result. Each half-hour episode would usually end with a dramatic cliffhanger, to increase the audience's incentive to tune into the next episode.

The original magnetic recordings of the show were erased shortly after broadcast, and for several decades it was believed that no recordings of the show had survived, although some were broadcast by the American Forces Radio and Television Service (AFRTS, formerly AFN) in Europe during the late 1970s. In 1986, a set of misfiled Transcription Service discs (produced for sale to overseas radio stations) was discovered, containing complete copies of the three original series (more accurately, the surviving version of the first series is a cut-down remake of the original, produced for the Transcription Service during the 1950s). This discovery enabled the BBC to begin re-broadcasting the show in the late 1980s, and release copies of the show, first on audio cassette, and more recently on CD and internet download.

Fans of Journey Into Space included Colin Pillinger, Kenny Everett, John Major, Stephen Hawking, Miriam Margolyes, and former Doctor Who producer Philip Hinchcliffe.

== The main characters ==
The four main characters appear in all the original series, as well as the later special episodes:

	Captain Andrew "Jet" Morgan	Doctor Daniel "Doc" Matthews	Stephen "Mitch" Mitchell	Lemuel "Lemmy" Barnet
Journey to the Moon	Andrew Faulds	Guy Kingsley Poynter	Bruce Beeby (episodes 2 to 6)	David Kossoff
Journey to the Moon	Andrew Faulds	Guy Kingsley Poynter	Don Sharp (episodes 7 to 18)	David Kossoff
The Red Planet	Andrew Faulds	Guy Kingsley Poynter	Bruce Beeby	David Kossoff
The World in Peril	Andrew Faulds	Guy Kingsley Poynter	Don Sharp	Alfie Bass
Operation Luna	Andrew Faulds	Guy Kingsley Poynter	David Williams	Alfie Bass
The Return from Mars	John Pullen	Ed Bishop	Nigel Graham	Anthony Hall
Frozen in Time	David Jacobs	Alan Marriott	Michael Beckley	Chris Moran
The Host	Toby Stephens	Alan Marriott	Jot Davies	Chris Pavlo

Guy Kingsley Poynter (who played Doc) had worked with Charles Chilton before Journey Into Space, and Chilton once commented that Poynter "was a very good poetry reader". Chilton also observed that Bruce Beeby was like his character Mitch, and was "always blowing his top".

David Kossoff asked Chilton if his character (the ship's radio operator) could be called Lemuel (a name he loved), and Chilton shortened the name to Lemmy. Chilton based Lemmy's character on himself, since he had been a radio operator in the RAF. Originally, Chilton had chosen John Glen to play Jet, but later decided to use Andrew Faulds instead, because Chilton's secretary fancied him.

David Jacobs's ability to play a wide variety of characters, each with their own distinctive voice, resulted in him playing 22 different characters during the course of Journey Into Space. He used to mark up his script using different colour pencils, to help him remember what each character was supposed to sound like. In episode 1 of The Red Planet, Jet is interviewed by a group of newspaper reporters, all of whom were played by Jacobs.

Light-hearted pranks were often played on David Jacobs just before a recording session was about to begin. On one occasion, Andrew Faulds poured a jug of water inside his trousers, totally soaking him, and he "did the rest of the programme in a raincoat!" On another occasion, some of the actors smeared mustard on his lip microphone, causing him some difficulties during the recording session.

Don Sharp later became a noted director.

== Original three series ==
=== Journey to the Moon/Operation Luna ===
Initially, the first series was simply known as Journey Into Space, with the subtitle A Tale of the Future added by the Radio Times, but within the BBC it became known as Journey to the Moon. The series was set in 1965 (the year in which Chilton believed humans would first walk on the Moon), and was first broadcast in 1953–1954 on the BBC Light Programme. The series was originally intended to have 12 episodes (one source claims 8 episodes), and 5.1 million people tuned into the first episode, but the first four episodes (which took place on Earth) did not prove very popular, and the audience soon shrank to fewer than 4 million. But once the rocket set off for the Moon in episode 5, the audience reaction was much more favourable. The series was extended to 18 episodes, and by the time the final episode was broadcast, 8 million people were tuning in.

In 1958, Journey to the Moon was re-recorded for the BBC Transcription Services (retitled as Operation Luna), because the original recordings had been erased. The first four episodes of the original series were omitted, and episodes 12 and 13 were merged into a single episode. Today, the only surviving recording from the original 1953 series Journey to the Moon is a 5-minute excerpt from the final episode.

Faulds, Kingsley Poynter, and Deryck Guyler were the only actors from Journey to the Moon to reprise their roles in Operation Luna.

In addition to the main characters, other characters in Journey to the Moon included:

Actor	Character
Wilfred Walter	Sir William Morgan
Robert Perceval	Mackenzie
Deryck Guyler	The Time-Traveller ("The Voice")
David Jacobs	Miscellaneous characters
John Cazabon	Earth Control
Alan Keith (*)	London correspondent
Duncan McIntyre	Jet's great uncle, Hector
Mark Baker	
Errol McKinnon	
Jessica Dunning	
Wyndham Milligan	

(*) Alan Keith (born Alec Kossoff) was the brother of David Kossoff, who played Lemmy.

Chilton wrote episode 8 of Journey to the Moon in response to a challenge from a TV producer, who considered the success of the series to be "a fluke". The producer challenged Chilton to write an episode "that could not be played equally well on television", and Chilton succeeded – a large proportion of the episode takes place in total darkness. During the episode, Jet reads to the rest of the crew by torchlight from The First Men in the Moon by H. G. Wells, the only work of fiction carried on board the ship.

Andrew Faulds's adopted uncle, Hector MacPherson, was an astronomer, and wrote a book called Practical Astronomy. Chilton bought a copy of the book, which first sparked his interest in astronomy, and later led him to write Journey Into Space. In episode 7 of Journey to the Moon, Jet's childhood flashback features his great uncle Hector, who was based on Hector MacPherson.

In November 1957, Chilton wrote an episode of the BBC School Radio science series Our Own and Other Worlds, titled "A Trip to the Moon", which featured edited material from episodes 5 and 6 of Journey to the Moon.

The table below indicates the correspondence between the episodes of Journey to the Moon and Operation Luna.

Journey to the Moon		Operation Luna		Brief plot summary
Episode	First broadcast	Episode	First broadcast	Brief plot summary
1	21 Sep 1953	–	–	The year is 1965, and Jet's father (Sir William Morgan) launches his A.24 rocket from the Rocket Research Station at Poker Flats. But something goes wrong, and the rocket heads towards Las Vegas, out of control.
2	28 Sep 1953	–	–	The rocket hits Las Vegas, killing at least 35 people, and the Poker Flats site is shut down. Meanwhile, Jet is invited by Mitch to join his Operation Luna project – a rocket to reach the Moon.
3	5 Oct 1953	–	–	Jet is appointed the rocket's pilot, and he and Lemmy travel to Australia to meet Mitch at the secret Operation Luna base. On arrival, Mitch takes them to meet Smitty, the team's doctor, but he is found dead.
4	12 Oct 1953	–	–	Doc Matthews replaces Smitty (who died from a coronary), and Lemmy is to be the radio operator. Mitch spots a plane flying around the launch site, suspects spies are active, and advances the launch date.
5	19 Oct 1953	1	26 Mar 1958	The rocket Luna sets off for the Moon with Jet, Doc, Mitch and Lemmy aboard. Radio contact with Earth is lost. Lemmy hears odd 'music' on the radio, before contact is resumed, and a tiny meteor hits Luna. No damage is sustained, but Lemmy hears the strange music again outside the ship and panics.
6	26 Oct 1953	2	2 Apr 1958	Luna is turned round for the Moon landing, and Lemmy hears the 'music' again during the final approach. The crew narrate their first moonwalk by radio to Earth on 22 October 1965. While exploring a crater, Jet unaccountably vanishes from sight.
7	2 Nov 1953	3	9 Apr 1958	The crew experience strange things: Jet has visions of the past and the future; Lemmy is disturbed by the 'music' again; Doc sees a strange dome over a crater, and writes an odd diary entry without realising. Their last week on the Moon passes without incident, but as they prepare to leave for home, the ship completely loses all power.
8	9 Nov 1953	4	16 Apr 1958	The crew are stuck on the Moon and unable to trace what has caused the power failure. A fortnight passes, with the air temperature rising uncomfortably in the absence of air-conditioning. A UFO is seen on the televiewer on the seventh day, and strange noises are heard on the tenth. When they are left with just enough oxygen to reach home, power is suddenly restored to the ship, and the UFO is seen to have landed outside.
9	16 Nov 1953	5	23 Apr 1958	Mitch is inquisitive and enters the UFO, where he is temporarily possessed by an alien intelligence. Luna takes off and orbits the Moon; on the far side, the crew encounter a fleet of UFOs, which pursues them.
10	23 Nov 1953	6	30 Apr 1958	The UFOs accelerate Luna to an incredible speed, and the crew blacks out. On recovering, they find themselves out in deep space, with no sign of the Earth or Moon. In the distance, a planet is approaching.
11	30 Nov 1953	7	7 May 1958	The crew land Luna on the planet and discover that it shares many of Earth's characteristics – oxygen atmosphere, drinkable water, carbon-based vegetation and ice-caps at both the poles. After studying the stars one night, Jet deduces that they in fact are on Earth, but that they've travelled thousands of years through time.
12	7 Dec 1953	8	14 May 1958	Jet discovers a prehistoric stone knife near Luna, suggesting that they've travelled back in time; but there is some confusion over this when the crew discover the tracks of a great tank-like machine near their ship. One morning, a UFO exactly like the one seen on the Moon lands nearby, and a voice is heard over the radio: "Hello Luna!"
13	14 Dec 1953	8	14 May 1958	Jet discovers a prehistoric stone knife near Luna, suggesting that they've travelled back in time; but there is some confusion over this when the crew discover the tracks of a great tank-like machine near their ship. One morning, a UFO exactly like the one seen on the Moon lands nearby, and a voice is heard over the radio: "Hello Luna!"
14	21 Dec 1953	9	21 May 1958	The crew talk with 'the voice'. They learn that the strange music they've been hearing is generated by a strange, omnipresent power that 'the voice' and his people use to drive their ships. 'The voice' warns them that they are in great danger, and persuades them to enter the UFO, which takes off. Eventually it lands again, in a city of domed buildings.
15	29 Dec 1953	10	28 May 1958	They learn more about 'the voice' and his people – they are a peaceful, scientific race from the opposite side of the universe. They learnt to travel through time when their solar system was threatened by its expanding sun. The crew explore the city, and are disturbed by a close encounter with a sabre-toothed tiger. Fortunately, the creature does not attack them, but they now realise that they have travelled back through time instead of forward. They enter a domed building, walk down a long dark tunnel, and emerge in a huge underground city. They are invited into another building to meet 'the voice', but are terrified by what they find inside...
16	5 Jan 1954	11	4 Jun 1958	'The voice' consoles the crew, who are embarrassed by their shock, and guides them to another dome where they are given a meal and beds to sleep in. Next morning, 'the voice' tells the crew about the Earth's native 'forest creatures', destructive and hostile animals, and promises to help the crew get back to their own time. While preparing Luna for take-off, the crew are horrified to realise that the 'forest creatures' are, in fact, prehistoric humans.
17	12 Jan 1954	12	11 Jun 1958	'The voice' is not pleased to learn that the crew are descended from the 'forest creatures', but in the end agrees to help them as arranged. Luna takes off and is accelerated by the UFOs; the crew blacks out. They start to ponder on the nature of time, and become concerned about their shortage of fuel, and whether they will remember their adventures when they reach their own time.
18	19 Jan 1954	13	18 Jun 1958	The crew successfully return to the Moon in 1965, but with no memory of their adventure on prehistoric Earth. However, their rations have been replaced by water and an unknown bread-like substance; Doc's diary contains a detailed account; and there's a prehistoric stone knife on board Luna...

=== The Red Planet ===
Journey Into Space featured on the cover of the Radio TimesGriffiths

The second series, The Red Planet, followed the adventures of the crew in their first attempt to reach and explore Mars. Several new characters were introduced, the most notable of which were Frank Rogers and James Edward Whitaker, the two original crewmen of freighter #2. Chilton took the name Whitaker from a copy of Whitaker's Almanack which was sitting on his desk.

In addition to the main characters, other characters in The Red Planet included:

Actor	Character(s)
David Jacobs	Frank Rogers and miscellaneous characters
Anthony Marriott	James Edward Whitaker
Miriam Karlin	Mrs Barnet (Lemmy's mother)
John Cazabon	Australian control voice, dingo hunter, flying doctor, John Bodie (sheep farmer), Bill Webster
Madi Hedd (*)	Martha Bodie (sheep farmer's wife)
Don Sharp	Sam (factory controller)

(*) Married to Bruce Beeby, who played Mitch.

The most memorable catchphrase from this series was "Orders must be obeyed without question at all times", which was often repeated by many of the 'conditioned' characters, especially Whitaker. Episode 19 of the series rated a 17% audience share, whereas the newsreel broadcast simultaneously on BBC TV had an audience share of 16%. This was the last time that a radio show achieved a higher rating than its TV opponent.

During the first broadcast of this series, the Radio Times featured Journey Into Space on its cover, showing Andrew Faulds as Captain "Jet" Morgan. His spacesuit (which was used by several of the cast members for publicity photos) was a prototype being developed in Britain at the time.

During the recording of The Red Planet, Guy Kingsley Poynter was also starring in The Teahouse of the August Moon at Her Majesty's Theatre.

The British Empire Exhibition was referred to throughout the episodes.

In the table of episodes below, the numbers marked with # refer to the numbered freighters of the Mars fleet.

Episode	First broadcast	Brief plot summary
1	6 Sep 1954	April 1971. Jet and Mitch travel from Earth to the Moon by rocket. The Mars fleet (the flagship Discovery, 8 freighters and 20 men) begins its journey. During an EVA, Mitch's safety line fails, leaving him adrift.
2	13 Sep 1954	Jet manages to rescue Mitch, using a miniature rocket unit. Frank Rogers, of #2, tells Lemmy he's not getting on at all well with Whitaker, his shipmate. Later, Control requests information about Whitaker; and Whitaker starts behaving very strangely while Jet is questioning him.
3	20 Sep 1954	While Whitaker is in a strange deep sleep, both Frank and Lemmy have nightmares. Radar suddenly reveals a huge meteor swarm ahead of the fleet, blocking its path. Just as Lemmy escorts Whitaker to his new ship, #7, a large meteor destroys the ship.
4	27 Sep 1954	Control discovers very odd information about Whitaker – the only man answering to his description was apparently born in 1893, and has been missing since 1924. The fleet changes course twice to avoid the meteor swarm, but both times it moves to block their path again. The crew realise they have only one option: to head straight through the swarm.
5	4 Oct 1954	The fleet enters the swarm, and for nearly 7 hours all electronic equipment is badly disrupted. Peterson reports an emergency on board #6 with Whitaker. On leaving the swarm, #6 is nowhere to be seen, and the swarm is now blocking radio contact with Control. Two weeks later, Discovery apparently re-establishes contact with home, but as they prepare to take an important message, the crew are puzzled by the short delay between replies.
6	11 Oct 1954	A radio message (apparently from Control) orders the fleet to return home. However, a bearing on the radio signal reveals the transmitter to be somewhere in front of the fleet, thus proving the message to be a fake. #6 is sighted ahead of the fleet, and Discovery draws up alongside it. Jet decides they must enter the ship to investigate.
7	18 Oct 1954	Jet and Doc transfer to #6, and Whitaker is found badly injured in the ship's hold, but Peterson has vanished. Jet has a strange dream, and Whitaker dies from his injuries, suddenly transforming into an old man. Recording tapes found in the cabin confirm the crew's suspicions that Whitaker faked the radio message. Discovery and #6 both rejoin the fleet, and Jet and Lemmy are shocked to hear Peterson's voice on the radio.
8	25 Oct 1954	Peterson's voice was actually a forgotten tape playing on the recording machine. Peterson's suicide recording is heard, and radio contact with Control is restored. The fleet finally enters orbit round Mars, and Discovery lands at the South Pole, but a strange soporific noise troubles the crew and causes them to crash-land.
9	1 Nov 1954	Jet reveals that the strange noise caused him to black out, but the crew are all safe. #1 lands alongside Discovery, and Jet and Mitch explore outside. Whilst conducting experiments, they soon get lost in a dense fog. They see a mysterious orange light, mistaking it for the landing light of the Discovery, and the same soporific noise heard during the landing causes them to lose consciousness.
10	8 Nov 1954	Doc and Frank rescue Jet and Mitch using a land transport truck, and Jet says he dreamed of a ruined city in a valley. Discovery's crew begin the exploration of Mars in the land trucks, whilst Freighter #2 begins to ferry supplies down from the fleet in orbit. However, on its second trip down, the freighter pilot hears the soporific noise and the ship apparently crashes.
11	15 Nov 1954	Racing to reach the crashed freighter before sunset, the Discovery's crew reaches the Mare Australis, the plain north of the ice cap. After nightfall, they see a mysterious white light moving across the plain. In the morning, they spot the crashed freighter, but upon reaching it find its crew missing. However, there are strange marks in the ground nearby which Jet deduces to belong to "the light", realising that a ship has visited and kidnapped the freighter crew. Jet resolves to change the exploration route and go after the ship.
12	22 Nov 1954	The Discovery crew travel west across the Mare Australis in pursuit of the mysterious ship. Meanwhile, Frank and Grimshaw, currently crew members of Freighter #1, reach the wrecked #2 and take up residence for the night. However, during the night, a 'sphere' (spherical UFO) arrives and its crew attempt to enter the wreck. Whilst observing the crew, Frank realises they are human. A few days later, Discovery's crew reach a valley in the Argyre Desert, and Jet spots a city which is identical to the one in his earlier dream.
13	29 Nov 1954	Discovery's crew explore the valley's ruined city, but Lemmy vanishes, and experiences a hypnotic dream. He's later found with McLean (pilot of #2), who is now mysteriously able to breathe the Martian atmosphere without a helmet.
14	6 Dec 1954	Jet and Doc return Lemmy to the caravans, and Doc deduces that Whitaker and McLean had been 'conditioned' (hypnotised), allowing them to be controlled, as well as breathe in the Martian atmosphere. Mitch becomes separated from the others, and meets a man who claims to be a dingo hunter in Australia. Meanwhile McLean, disguised in Mitch's spacesuit, enters the caravan and confronts Lemmy.
15	13 Dec 1954	McLean reveals that only two of his three crew mates survived the crash, and declares that Mitch is alive but will never return to the fleet or Earth. He then tries to overpower but Lemmy wins the fight. The sphere is spotted on top of the city, but takes off with Jet, Lemmy and Doc in pursuit again. Meanwhile, Mitch, lost in the desert and now able to breathe the Martian atmosphere, comes across a house inhabited by a man and woman, who claim to be sheep farmers living in Australia in 1939. Driven to a frenzy, Mitch demands explanations, only for the farmer to turn his rifle on him.
16	20 Dec 1954	Jet, Doc and Lemmy discover the farm house, and find Mitch inside it. But Mitch is now 'conditioned' to believe he's in Australia, and doesn't recognise the others. He refuses to rejoin them, and attacks Jet, puncturing his helmet. As the others work to save him, the sphere lands outside and the crew are trapped.
17	27 Dec 1954	A 'flying doctor' has arrived in the sphere, with Dobson and Harding of #2 'conditioned' and working as his assistants. Although Jet successfully escapes back to the land trucks, the doctor manages to capture Doc and Lemmy. He tries to 'condition' them using the soporific noise, but they manage to resist. They find themselves being taken to a much larger Martian city.
18	3 Jan 1955	Jet sets out after the sphere again, having ordered McLean to follow him in the second caravan. Meanwhile, the sphere arrives at Lacus Solis (the Martian capital), and the flying doctor reveals the Martian plan to invade the Earth in 1986. Lemmy overpowers the doctor in a struggle, and he and Doc contact Frank, who is searching for them in #1. Through him, they pass their news to Jet, but then Frank hears the soporific noise and his freighter crashes.
19	10 Jan 1955	Doc and Lemmy escape the city in the sphere with Mitch, who starts to recover from his 'conditioning', but can only remember being two weeks away from reaching Mars. Meanwhile, Jet is contacted by Webster, a man trying to return to Earth, and learns more about the Martians. Webster offers to help Jet find his lost crew mates, but while travelling across the desert, they spot a sphere hovering above them.
20	17 Jan 1955	The sphere turns out to be Doc and Lemmy's, and Discovery crew are fully reunited at last thanks to advice from Webster, Mitch completes his recovery. Jet, Lemmy and Webster try to rescue Frank and Grimshaw from an underground factory, but they cannot be reached, and during a fight with the factory supervisor, Webster is injured and dies. The crew return to Discovery at the North Pole, and take off for home, escaping a pursuing fleet of spheres. Their news of the upcoming Martian invasion is passed to Earth, causing great commotion. They land back on the Moon six months later, but what happens next is another story...

=== The World in Peril ===
The third series was a direct continuation of the story begun in The Red Planet, and followed Jet Morgan and his crew's return to Mars in an attempt to avert the impending Martian invasion.

In addition to the main characters, other characters in The World in Peril included:

Actor	Character
David Jacobs	Frank Rogers and miscellaneous characters
Alan Tilvern	Jack Evans (lunar controller)
John Cazabon	Jenkins (rocket station supervisor)
Fred Yule	Mr Moore
Pat Campbell	Paddy Flynn

During the recording of The World in Peril, Alfie Bass was also starring in the revue The Punch Bowl at the Duke of York's Theatre.

Episode	First broadcast	Brief plot summary
1	26 Sep 1955	15 April 1972. The Discovery and two freighters return to the Moon from the disastrous Mars expedition. The crew are subjected to intense questioning about their experiences on Mars, and Lemmy discovers that the Discovery is being readied for take off. Back on Earth, they visit an astronomical observer who has spotted suspicious objects in the heavens.
2	3 Oct 1955	Jet and Lemmy go to investigate the objects in an orbital rocket, but are sent to sleep for 24 hours by a strange noise. Film footage suggests the asteroids are actually spacecraft carriers. Jet discovers that a spaceship has crashed in the Lake District. Jet and Doc enter the ship.
3	10 Oct 1955	The crew and the Lunar Controller try to locate the crew of the crashed ship. They interview Moore, a commercial traveller who may have had contact with the crew of the ship, who recounts his experience. The crew are ordered back to Mars and are driven to an airfield, but the car crashes when the crew tackle the 'Conditioned Type' driver.
4	17 Oct 1955	The crew fly to Australia, then on a ship to the Moon. While preparing for the voyage to Mars, they spot unidentified objects on the lunar horizon. The take off is complicated by strange communication with control, suggesting the Moon base has been infiltrated.
5	24 Oct 1955	The Discovery gets away safely; however, they cannot establish contact with Moon control, so Lemmy contacts Earth. After ships from Earth to the Moon are lost, the crew concludes that the Moon has fallen under Martian control. While refuelling from freighter #1, Jet and Lemmy hear a strange wailing voice.
6	31 Oct 1955	The crew slow the ship down, and discuss where on Mars to land and the objectives of the trip. They regain contact with the strange voice, discovering it is a very confused Frank Rogers, ex-crew man of Freighter #2.
7	7 Nov 1955	Thinking Frank may be there, the crew decide to land near the wreck of freighter #2, but Jet and Mitch discover it to be empty. From the Discovery, Doc and Lemmy spot a fleet of Martian spheres approaching.
8	14 Nov 1955	Jet and Mitch fail to make it back to Discovery, and the crew all pass out as the ships approach. They wake up in a dark room and figure that they must be on one of the moons of Mars. They discover an unconscious man in the room, that Jet is missing, and a door in the floor opens.
9	21 Nov 1955	Jet is found under his bed and the unconscious man is found to be Frank Rogers. Doc tries to bring Frank out of his conditioned state, and he reveals that the invasion is under way. Jet and Lemmy go through the floor, and are directed by the voice of Paddy Flynn.
10	28 Nov 1955	Frank regains some of his memory, revealing that the crew are aboard an asteroid ship. Jet and Lemmy meet Paddy face to face, and he reveals that he is the rebel captain of the asteroid, working with Jack Evans. Paddy receives orders to have the asteroid join the invasion fleet.
11	5 Dec 1955	Paddy leaves the crew, who learn how to manipulate the 'visionphone'. As Mitch and Frank follow them along a circular corridor using the cameras, Jet, Lemmy and Doc hear a voice they assume to be a Martian, ordering them back.
12	12 Dec 1955	Jet, Lemmy and Doc ignore the Martian's warnings to turn back, and Jet is knocked out after touching a door at the end of the corridor. The crew persuades Paddy to set the ship on course for Mars, so they can warn Earth of the invasion. However, he loses control, and is injured.
13	19 Dec 1955	The asteroid is in chaos and the crew discover Asteroid 786/738 is on its way to sort it out. Mitch and Lemmy go to fetch a bed for Paddy, but become lost and enter the Martian's lair. They hear a familiar voice but can't place it. Paddy dies, and Mitch and Lemmy discover that Jack Evans is really the Lunar Controller, who has been in league with the Martians from the start.
14	26 Dec 1955	The Lunar Controller tells Mitch and Lemmy that the invasion will be facilitated by a hypnotic television broadcast. Jet and Doc go on a search for the others, and follow conditioned crew members onto the asteroid surface. Wearing Martian suits, they investigate a large sphere, but become stranded on the surface.
15	2 Jan 1956	While the Lunar Controller is away, Jet and Doc enter his quarters from the asteroid surface. Mitch and Lemmy explain what has happened to them, and they hatch a plan to imprison the Lunar Controller and escape.
16	9 Jan 1956	The crew imprison the Lunar Controller, and gain his assistance by threatening to release him into space. Lemmy smashes up the computerised brain, to stop messages being sent to the rest of the Martian fleet. Frank pilots the ship as they escape the asteroid and set course for Mars, but they discover the Discovery to have been plundered.
17	16 Jan 1956	They head into orbit, transfer to Freighter #1 and, using a modified radio transmitter, attempt to contact Earth, but they cannot get their warning about the invasion through. They spot the asteroid invasion fleet approaching them from behind. Jet decides to use all remaining fuel to set on course for Earth, in order to increase their chances of warning Earth of the invasion.
18	23 Jan 1956	The asteroid fleet increases speed and overtakes Freighter #1. Jet records a warning to Earth, to be transmitted on a loop. Attempts to hypnotise the crew fail, so the Martian contacts the crew using their voices. Freighter #1 crashes onto the surface of a large asteroid.
19	30 Jan 1956	Lemmy fails to contact Earth, but they are contacted by the Martian who tells them to enter the asteroid ship. The Martian reveals that he is the only one left of a race of giants, and explains his reasons for the invasion. A crew from the asteroid, including ex-freighter man Harding, forcibly remove the crew from Freighter #1.
20	6 Feb 1956	The crew are shown to luxurious quarters aboard the asteroid, and cruise to Earth as part of the invasion fleet. They are ordered to the Martian's quarters, where they are dismayed to discover that Earth has not followed their instruction to shut down all television channels. Depressed by their failure, they watch as the Martian fleet begins to orbit the Earth. As they wait for the Martian's broadcast, the set goes dead. They are overjoyed to learn that the channels have at last been shut down. The Martian peacefully accepts defeat and allows all those in his command to return to Earth. A considerable number, however, choose to remain in the Martian's fleet, and to establish a perfect civilisation in another solar system, free from persecution, hunger, misgovernment and war.

== Critical reaction and legacy ==
Public reaction to the show was mixed. Some comments received by the BBC described the show as "a first class affair" and "the best serial for ages". After episode 5 of Journey to the Moon was first broadcast, the Daily Express commented: "Hats off to Charles Chilton, who has switched from Riders of the Range to Journey Into Space with masterly ease. I rate this space travel serial as the most exciting piece of radio material for years."

Midway through the original broadcast of The Red Planet, a BBC Audience Research Report indicated that the series was described as "thrilling", "fascinating" and "most entertaining"... "This is obviously very much a family occasion in many homes, the entire household following the adventures of Jet Morgan and Co. with great interest."

Others commented that the plot often featured scientific inaccuracies, even though Chilton had received technical advice from Flight Lieutenant Roger Burton and Kenneth Gatland of the British Interplanetary Society. One correspondent to the Radio Times commented that Journey Into Space was a "glorified interstellar 'horse-opera' with no coherent plot, which relied on odd musical arrangements to bolster up the stilted conversations of characters with no substance. There were no convincing word pictures of the new world: 'Jet' lacked tact and leader qualities and 'Lemmy' was an improbable space traveller, not to mention electronic engineer!"

Chilton admitted that he was not a science-fiction writer, astronomer, or scientist, and that his "pursuit of astronomical studies" was "clumsy and very amateurish". He often "worked very late to deadline", sometimes not starting to write an episode until two days before recording.

Journey Into Space remains popular today, thanks to the discovery of misfiled recordings of the show, which enabled the BBC to begin re-broadcasting the show from the late 1980s onwards. According to The Sunday Times in 2008: "Today it still enjoys a huge fanbase, with active websites and keenly received repeats on digital radio channel BBC Radio 4 Extra."

Doctor Who producer Philip Hinchcliffe grew up listening to Journey Into Space and cited its cliffhangers as an influence on his period on the series between 1974 and 1977.

== Music ==
Van Phillips composed and conducted the music for all three series. The music was initially recorded beforehand, and played from acetate discs during the recording sessions. Later, an eight-piece orchestra was actually present in the studio, and played the music live. Phillips liked the sound of the clavioline, and obtained one for use during Journey Into Space. He composed music especially for it, and it was "bolted onto the piano" in the studio. Titles of his compositions include "A Picture of the Universe", "Rocket Away", "Music for Outer Space", "The Red Planet", "Crossing the Plains", and "Sunrise".

In 1955, Decca released a 78rpm record of the Journey Into Space theme, performed by Frank Weir and his orchestra (catalogue number F.10435), and sheet music of a piano solo of the theme was also published. In 1978, the recording was included on the 33 1/3 rpm BBC compilation record BBC Space Themes (catalogue number REH 324), and in 2005, Vocalion/Dutton Laboratories included it on their digitally remastered compilation CD Presenting Frank Weir And His Saxophone (catalogue number CDLK 4266).

In Journey to the Moon, Lemmy occasionally provided musical entertainment for the crew on his mouth organ, playing songs such as "Knocked 'em in the Old Kent Road" and "My Old Dutch". Excerpts of popular music were often used during the episodes, and sometimes played an important role in the plot. In episode 8 of Journey to the Moon, an excerpt from "Honeymoon on a Rocket Ship" by Hank Snow and The Rainbow Ranch Boys is heard by the crew on the ship's radio. "When It's Night Time In Italy", by James Kendis and Lew Brown, was an important part of episodes 7 and 8 of The Red Planet. Other popular music used in The Red Planet included:

- "Flat Foot Floogie", by Bulet Galliard, Leroy Stewart, and Bud Green, performed by the Benny Goodman Orchestra
- The theme tune to the Billy Cotton Band Show
- "Somebody Stole My Gal", by Lee Wright
- "Friends and Neighbours", by Marvin Scott and Malcolm Lockyer
- "Selection of Hebrew Dances Part 2", by Ambrose and his orchestra
- Banjo music by Billy Bell

The World in Peril featured a 'rebel song', sung by the 'conditioned' men aboard the Martian asteroids. This song was actually a musical arrangement of The Green Hills of Earth (a poem taken from Robert Heinlein's short story of the same name), performed by the George Mitchell Choir. In the final episode of The World in Peril, Chopin Opus 34: No. 2: Valse brillante in A minor is heard playing over the radio.

== Sound effects ==
A variety of sound effects was used in the episodes, and played a major role. In addition to basic sounds, such as feet walking along a corridor or tunnel, more advanced effects were created, such as the mysterious haunting 'music' which is heard over the rocket's radio in many episodes of Operation Luna.

The most distinctive effect was the dramatic rocket take-off, which was played at the beginning of each episode, and whenever necessary during the episodes. This was actually a recording of a jet aircraft at Heathrow airport. Often, this would be followed by a slowly ascending tone (representing the rocket accelerating), which "was actually a recording of a thermionic valve played through an echo chamber down at the Physical Research Laboratory at Kingston". Other sound effects were created at Battersea Power Station, and the sound made by the televiewer on board Luna was actually a naval ASDIC.

The BBC had an echo chamber in the studio, which was greatly utilised during the episodes. Whenever the crew were in contact by radio with Earth control, or another distant location, the echo chamber would be applied to the voice of the remote character. Various sound effects were also created "live" in the studio. For example, in episode 8 of Journey to the Moon, the crew hear a mysterious tapping on the outside of the ship; this effect was created "by tapping the needle of the gramophone pickup head, and playing that through an echo chamber".

The operation of the Martian "Brain" when compiling an answer in response to questions was represented by the sound of a 2000-type Director - a telephone call routing device used in large city Strowger type telephone exchanges.

== Novels ==
Chilton wrote three Journey Into Space novels, one for each of the three original series. The first novel, titled Journey Into Space, told the story of Journey to the Moon and was the first book that Chilton had written. It was published in hardback by Herbert Jenkins in 1954, followed by The Red Planet in 1956, and The World in Peril in 1960. Later they were published in paperback by Pan in 1958, 1960 and 1962 respectively.

On 8 May 2008, BBC Audiobooks released a complete and unabridged audiobook of the first novel, read by William Hope.

== Comic strips ==
In 1956, the Junior Express comic began publishing Journey Into Space comic strips, with scripts by Charles Chilton and artwork by Italian artist Ferdinando Tacconi. The first adventure, titled Jet Morgan in Planet of Fear, was a 35-episode sequel to The World in Peril. Tacconi spent some time with Chilton absorbing the atmosphere of the saga, and portrayed (in full colour) the radio actors' likenesses to match the clever dialogue.

The story was continued in 1957 in the 32-episode adventure, Shadow over Britain. In March 1957, Arthur Bruce Cornwell took over from Tacconi as artist, and Chilton lost his enthusiasm for the cartoon strip; thereafter it became a contractual chore for him. Terence Patrick took over from Cornwell in April 1957, and by the time the third adventure began (The World Next Door), Chilton was no longer writing the scripts.

The 1956 Express Weekly annual contained a short black & white comic strip called Jet Morgan and the Space Pirates, illustrated by Tacconi. (Express Weekly was the new name of Junior Express.) The 1957 annual included a short story called Jet Morgan and the Space Castaway, written by Chilton and illustrated by Cornwell.

== Discovery of transcription discs ==
The programmes were recorded in the studio on 15 ips magnetic tape, and were later copied onto 33⅓ rpm 16-inch coarse-groove transcription discs for the BBC Transcription Services (except for Journey to the Moon episodes). The master tapes were erased three months after broadcast, in accordance with BBC policy at the time. The transcription discs were sold overseas, and their fate was unknown, so for many years it was believed that all the episodes had been lost forever, although a number were broadcast by the American Forces Radio and Television Service (AFRTS, formerly AFN) in Europe during the late 1970s.

However, in 1986, a set of misfiled transcription discs was found by Ted Kendall, a BBC recording engineer, which turned out to be copies of Operation Luna, The Red Planet and The World in Peril. The BBC no longer possessed a suitable turntable on which to play the discs, but Kendall managed to obtain an EMT 927 turntable. To clean the discs, he soaked them in warm water containing Fairy Liquid, brushed them with a goats-hair brush, and dried them using kitchen towels.

Kendall transferred the recordings to magnetic tape, removing "clicks" from the sound using a device which he designed and built, called the Mousetrap (or Front End). He removed more severe clicks after the transfer, by scraping the oxide off the magnetic tape in appropriate places.

The BBC took the opportunity to re-broadcast all three series on Radio 2, beginning with Operation Luna in 1989, followed by The Red Planet in 1990 and The World in Peril in 1991. Abridged versions of the three series were also released on audio cassette. In 1998, Kendall digitally remastered the recordings for new abridged releases on audio cassette, and in 2004, the unabridged remastered recordings began to be released on CD and internet download. The three series have also been broadcast on BBC Radio 7, now known as BBC Radio 4 Extra.

== Special episodes ==
=== The Return from Mars ===
In 1981, Radio 4's Saturday Night Theatre slot ran a special science fiction series, featuring stories such as The First Men in the Moon, The Chrysalids, A Fall of Moondust and The Technicolor Time Machine. Charles Chilton was asked to write a new one-off 90-minute episode of Journey Into Space for this slot, and The Return from Mars was the result. The plot was an approximate continuation from the end of The World in Peril. The episode was broadcast on 7 March 1981.

In addition to the main characters, other characters in The Return from Mars included:

Actor	Character(s)
Elizabeth Proud	Cassia
Patrick Barr	Nichols
David Bradshawe	Wrist radio / Countdown voice
Graham Faulkner	Pilot / Talian
Stephen Garlick	Controller / Radio voice
John McAndrew	Videophone / Junior officer
Sion Probert	Control / Sotteer 2
Christopher Scott	Sotteer 1 / Harry
John Webb	Supervisor / Radio

Episode	First broadcast	Brief plot summary
1	7 Mar 1981	Jet Morgan and his crew return to Earth from Mars, only to find they have been missing, presumed dead, for more than thirty years.

=== Frozen in Time ===
This was a new episode based on the original series, with David Jacobs finally taking the role of Jet Morgan (who has aged while the rest of his crew were in suspended animation owing to a systems malfunction). Charles Chilton wrote the one-hour play which was set in the year 2013. It was broadcast on Radio 4 on Saturday 12 April 2008. This was released by BBC Audio in January 2009. ISBN 978-1-4084-0104-0

Part	Played by
Captain Jet Morgan	David Jacobs
Mitch	Michael Beckley
Doc/Ed	Alan Marriott
Lemmy	Chris Moran
Astrid	Emma Fielding
Jensen	Stephen Hogan
Radio Operator/Film Voice	Kate Harbour

Music by David Chilton; producer/director Nicholas Russell-Pavier.

Episode	First broadcast	Brief plot summary
1	12 Apr 2008	March 2013. The Ares' crew awakens from suspended animation and, low on fuel and technologically outclassed, goes to rescue a mining operation on Mars.

=== The Host ===
A further new episode based on the original series by Chilton, written by Julian Simpson starred Toby Stephens as Jet Morgan. Another one-hour play, it was set in the year 2079. Broadcast as The Saturday Play on Radio 4 on Saturday 27 June 2009.

Part	Played by
Captain Jet Morgan	Toby Stephens
Mitch	Jot Davies
Doc/Enceladus Control	Alan Marriott
Lemmy	Chris Pavlo
The Host	David Jacobs
Edie	Jana Carpenter
JJ Andreev	Basher Savage
End credit narration	Charles Chilton

Episode	First broadcast	Brief plot summary
1	27 Jun 2009	Jet Morgan and his crew discover a digitised personality aboard an abandoned space freighter, intent on making mankind a dispensable stepping stone to a new chapter in evolution.

== BBC releases on audio cassette and CD ==
Series	Format	Abridged?	Release date	Released by	ISBN	Extras
Operation Luna	4 cassettes	Yes	1989	BBC Enterprises Ltd	0563226323	None
Operation Luna	6 cassettes	Yes	1996	BBC Worldwide Ltd	0563388935	None
Operation Luna	4 cassettes	Yes	1998	BBC Worldwide Ltd	0563557524	
Operation Luna	7 CDs	No	5 July 2004	BBC Audiobooks Ltd	0563524898	Journey Into Space... Again documentary Excerpt from Journey to the Moon
The Red Planet	6 cassettes	Yes	1991	BBC Enterprises Ltd	0563409924	None
The Red Planet	4 cassettes	Yes	1998	BBC Worldwide Ltd	0563557575	
The Red Planet	10 CDs	No	3 January 2005	BBC Audiobooks Ltd	0563524944	Charles Chilton interview, Round Midnight
The World in Peril	6 cassettes	Yes	1994	BBC Enterprises Ltd	0563394374	
The World in Peril	4 cassettes	Yes	1998	BBC Worldwide Ltd	0563557621	None
The World in Peril	12 CDs	Planned 10-CD release 4 October 2006, cancelled (Released Unabridged on 12 CDs in Aug 2011)			978-1408469941	Return From Mars (1981); Archive Hour 'Another Journey into Space'; 16 page PDF booklet about World in Peril
The Return from Mars	2 cassettes	No	2000	BBC Worldwide Ltd	0563553618	Journey Into Space... Again documentary

=== Audiobooks ===
Currently, only the first novel has been released as an audiobook.

Novel	Release date	Released by	Format	ISBN
Journey Into Space	8 May 2008	BBC Audiobooks	6 CDs	9781405688680
Journey Into Space	8 May 2008	BBC Audiobooks	Internet download	9781405646628

== In translation ==
A Dutch-language version of the first three series of Journey into Space was broadcast in the Netherlands by the Katholieke Radio Omroep (KRO) in 1955–1958 under the title Sprong in het heelal (Dutch for 'Leap Into the Universe'), directed by Léon Povel. Translation was by Eddy Franquinet and the main character roles were played by John de Freese (Jeff Morgan [sic]), Adolf Bouwmeester / Louis de Bree (Doc Matthews), Jan van Ees (Mitch Mitchell), and Jan Borkus (Jimmy Barnett).

Director Léon Povel died just a few days after Charles Chilton, on 8 January 2013, at the age of 101 years. After his death, his youngest son Winfried Povel started recording the fourth series De terugkeer van Mars (Dutch for 'Return from Mars') with professional actors and as a special guest the Dutch astronaut André Kuipers. The recording was much longer than the BBC version, at 2 hours 11 minutes, so the play was edited into four episodes (30–36 minutes each) and broadcast as a mini-series. It was broadcast in January 2014 by the KRO-NCRV as well on NPO Radio 5 and repeated the same night on NPO Radio 1.

== Other related series ==
Chilton followed Journey Into Space with two other radio series – Space Force in 1984 and Space Force II in 1985 – which were based on a similar theme. Indeed, Space Force had originally been intended as a new Journey Into Space serial, following on from The Return from Mars, until relatively late in the day, so its four central characters are clear 'doubles' for the Journey Into Space team. In the version that was actually recorded and transmitted, one character (Chipper Barnett) refers to his grandfather Lemmy.
