= Citizen of Westminster =

- Written by: John Morgan
- Directed by: Raymond Menmuir
- Country of origin: Australia
- Original language: English

Production
- Running time: 60 mins
- Production company: ABC

Original release
- Network: ABC
- Release: 8 October 1958 (Sydney, live)
- Release: 30 November 1958 (Melbourne, taped)

Citizen of Westminster is an early example of Australian television drama which aired on ABC. It is not known if a copy still exists of the presentation, given the wiping of the era.

== Plot ==
A British M.P. is in love with a married woman.

== Cast ==
- Bruce Beeby
- Madi Heed
- Ric Hutton
- Geoffrey King
- Frank Taylor
- Robin Blyth

== Production ==
The show starred real-life husband and wife Bruce Beeby and Madi Hedd. The two had just returned to Australia in 1957, after six years of working in British theatre, film and TV. They had previously appeared together for the ABC in Ending It. The script was adapted by Alan Seymour.

The show was filmed at the ABC Studios in Gore Hill, Sydney.

== Broadcast ==
A one-off play set in England, the production aired live on 8 October 1958 in Sydney, and kinescoped for showing in Melbourne on 30 November 1958. Australian TV drama was relatively rare at the time.

It was broadcast in a series of 'live' dramas, shown every fortnight on Sunday night on ABV-2 Melbourne (some broadcast live from Melbourne, others taped from a live Sydney production). In order, they were The Governess, The Last Call, The Rose without a Thorn, The Lark, Citizen of Westminster, and Enemy of the People (the last of "the season").

== See also ==
- List of live television plays broadcast on Australian Broadcasting Corporation (1950s)
