= The Price of Fear =

The Price of Fear may refer to:

- The Price of Fear (radio serial), a BBC horror/mystery radio serial
- The Price of Fear (1956 film), an American film noir crime film
- The Price of Fear (1928 film), an American silent western film
