= Charles Chilton =

BBC radio presenter, writer and producer (1917–2013)

Charles Chilton MBE
- Born: 15 June 1917; Bloomsbury, London, England
- Died: 2 January 2013 (aged 95); Hampstead, London, England
- Occupations: Radio presenter; Writer; Radio producer
- Employer: BBC

Charles Frederick William Chilton MBE (15 June 1917 – 2 January 2013) was a British presenter, writer and producer who worked on BBC Radio. He created the 1950s radio serials Riders of the Range and Journey into Space, and also inspired the stage show and film Oh, What a Lovely War!.

== Early life ==
Born in Bloomsbury in London, England, Chilton never knew his father – who was killed during the First World War – and when he was six his mother died as a result of having a botched abortion, with the result that he was brought up by his grandmother. He was educated at St. Pancras Church of England School.

Chilton left school at the age of 14, and after a brief apprenticeship making electric signs, he joined the BBC as a messenger boy. A year later he became an assistant in their gramophone library. He had a passion for jazz music, and in 1937 formed the BBC Boys' Jazz band.

== Career ==
His first role as a producer was for I Hear America Singing, after which he moved to the BBC variety department. He then presented his own show between 11pm and midnight called Swing Time, and a weekly jazz programme called Radio Rhythm Club. Next came five years' war service with the RAF, after which he was sent to Ceylon to run the forces radio station with broadcaster David Jacobs, later to participate in Chilton's radio series Journey into Space.

Back in the BBC he wrote and produced programmes for, among others, Roy Plomley, Michael Bentine and Stéphane Grappelli. In 1947 he married Penelope (née Colbeck (born 1921)), who was a secretary at the corporation. He was then sent to the United States to research, write and produce a number of series based on American western history. One of these, Riders of the Range, lasted for five years until 1953. During its run, Riders of the Range attracted audiences of around 10 million. Chilton wrote a comic-strip version of the series drawn by Frank Humphris for the Eagle which outlasted the radio version, and wrote another western series, "Flying Cloud", for the Eagle's sister comic Girl. Chilton was also briefly a producer on the comedy series The Goon Show.

Major international recognition came with his science-fiction trilogy Journey into Space, which he wrote and produced between 1953 and 1958. His interest in space and space travel also led him to join the British Astronomical Association and the British Interplanetary Society.

He was presented with an MBE in 1972.

He spent his last years acting as a tour guide for the Original London Walks company.

== Legacy ==
In January 2014, BBC Radio 4 Extra broadcast a selection of programmes to celebrate the life and work of Charles Chilton. This included The Long, Long Trail, telling the story of the First World War through the songs sung by soldiers, broadcast for the first time since its original transmission on the BBC Home Service in 1961.

On 4 January 2014, in conjunction with BBC Radio 4 Extra, BBC Radio 4 broadcast Archive on 4: The Long, Long Trail. Roy Hudd told the story of Chilton's ground-breaking 1961 musical documentary. Interviewees included satirist Ian Hislop, Chilton's widow Penelope and their children Mary (born 1951) and David Chilton (born 1952) and the producer was Amber Barnfather. In a five-star review, the Financial Times said "Chilton ... merits this tribute – as does the British soldier's stoic humour that so movingly illumines the four-year hell." Archive on 4: The Long, Long Trail won a Silver Radio Award in the New York Festivals International Radio Program Awards 2014.

== Production/writing credits ==
- Follow the Fun (writer) play.
- Fledgling (writer) play based on Follow the Fun (1940).
- The Long Long Trail (writer) – a musical about the First World War featuring popular songs of the time interspersed with scripted material.
- Oh, What a Lovely War! (originator and producer)
- Round the Bend in Thirty Minutes (producer, series 2 and 3, 1958 to 1960) – starring Michael Bentine
- Riders of the Range – a cowboy series that found its way into the 1950s Eagle comic book.
- Shakespeare's London
- Dickens' London
- London's Pleasure Gardens
- Cries of London
- Ballad History of Samuel Pepys
- The Goon Show (producer) – series 3 episodes 18 and 19, series 8 episodes 1–5 and 17–26, 'Vintage Goons' series episodes 1–2 and 9–14.
- How Jazz Came to Britain (presenter, 8 July 2000)
- Journey into Space (writer/producer)
- Space Force (writer/producer, 1984 and 1985)
- Whistle and I'll Come To You - The Life and Loves of Robbie Burns

Additional production/writing credits: These 30-minute radio programmes were broadcast on NZBC in the 1970s, presumably from transcription disks from the Overseas Service of the BBC / BBC World Service (these discs should still be available somewhere):

- Botany Bay by Charles Chilton. The founding of New South Wales, Australia.
- The Victory by Charles Chilton. A musical presentation about HMS Victory, Nelson's flagship.
