= Beatrice Aiello =

Italian actress and artist

Beatrice Aiello is an Italian actress and artist.

== TV activity ==
Aiello's activity for broadcast television includes the 2011 and 2016 seasons of Che dio ci aiuti, a Lux Video TV series for Rai Fiction, aired on Rai 1; the 2014 season of CentoVetrine, an Italian Mediaset soap opera production for Canale 5 and Rete 4; the 2012 season of Provaci ancora prof, an Italian Rai 1 TV series; and the 2011 season of Inspector Rex for Rai 1. She also worked with director Francesca Mazzoleni.

== Theatre and other activities ==
Aiello's theatrical activities includes work with Giorgio Albertazzi, Sergio Rubini, Daniele Salvo, Pierpaolo Sepe, Marco Maltauro, and Nicola Pistoia. In 2014 she starred in the play Come restare vedove senza intaccare la fedina penale. She also wrote and produced the play Gocce.

Aiello's voice and image have been used in advertising including the 2016 US Open campaign for Lavazza with Andre Agassi, directed by Michael Haussman; 2016 Global Alitalia video campaign directed by Federico Brugia; Michael Haussman's video for Galbani France; video clip directed by Antonio Chiricò for rapper Jesto's "Paranoia-Park"; and video clip "Gold" directed by David Petrucci.

Aiello has also performed at international public events like the Benefit Gala held by UNICEF in Tbilisi, Georgia (2014), and the presentation of the New Generation A-Class Mercedes-Benz in Rome (2013). She was a reporter for Mymovies at the 67° Venice Film Festival (2010).

Aiello has posed for photographers such as Giovanni Gastel and Pierpaolo Ferrari.

== Training ==
Aiello completed her studies in 2012 at the YD'Actors Academy (Rome), directed by Yvonne D'Abbraccio.

Her professional training includes studies with Doris Hicks (Actors Studio), Alessandro Fabrizi (Accademia Nazionale D'Arte Drammatica Silvio D'Amico, Rome), Vladimir Olshansky, Manuél Morón, Juan Carlos Corazza, Oliver Mannel (Zürcher Hochschule der Künste) and Natsuko Ohama (University of Southern California), Mamadou Dioume, Rita Forzano, Stefano Di Leo and Gianluca Testa.
