= The Sandcastle (novel) =

Book by Iris Murdoch

- Cover of the first edition
- Author: Iris Murdoch
- Cover artist: Charles Mozley
- Language: English
- Publisher: Chatto and Windus
- Publication date: December 1957
- Publication place: Ireland
- Media type: Print (Hardback & Paperback)
- Pages: 320 pp (hardback edition)
- OCLC: 60590831

The Sandcastle is a novel by Iris Murdoch, published in 1957. It is the story of a middle-aged schoolmaster (Bill Mor) with political ambitions who meets a young painter (Rain Carter), come to paint a former school headmaster's portrait.

== Synopsis ==
Bill Mor is a middle-aged History and Latin teacher at a public school. He is married to Nan and has two children, Donald and Felicity. Mor has political ambitions to stand as a candidate for the Labour party, although his wife is firmly opposed to any such ambitions. At a friends' dinner, he makes the acquaintance of Rain Carter, a young artist who has arrived at the school to paint a portrait of Demoyte, the school's former headmaster. Mor shows Rain Carter around the town. They are spotted together by Mor's friend Tim Burke, who suspects Mor and Carter might be having an affair.

On one outing, Mor wants to show Miss Carter a small river outside the town. Miss Carter lets Mor, who doesn't have a license, drive her car through rough terrain, but the car gets stuck and damaged. Mor gets home late from this misadventure but chooses not to tell his wife about the incident. Nan and Felicity go away for a holiday in Dorset, and the love affair between Mor and Rain Carter develops during this time.

Nan comes home early from her holiday and surprises Mor kneeling in front of Rain with his head in her lap. In despair, Nan goes to Tim Burke. After a moment of mutual attraction between the two, Burke advises Nan to go back to her husband and not to ruin their relationship. However, Bill finds himself incapable of letting go of Rain. He is taken by her to an exhibition of her works in London and is deeply impressed with the pictures.

Meanwhile, Mor's son Don climbs the school tower with a friend and is saved from a dangerous fall by his father, upon which Don is expelled from the school. He runs away from home and is missing for days. During his absence, there is a function at the school for the unveiling of the new portrait. Nan gives a public speech at this gathering, praising and encouraging her husband's political ambitions. Rain, who knew nothing of this side of Mor's life, decides to leave him in order not to be in the way of his ambitions and resolves to go back to France.

That night, she paints until the early hours of the morning, changing Demoyte's face in the portrait and, by daybreak, has left. Don returns home.

== Characters in "The Sandcastle" ==
- Bill Mor
- Nan Mor (Mor's wife)
- Felicity Mor (Mor's daughter)
- Donald Mor (Mor's son)
- Rain Carter
- Demoyte (former headmaster)

== The Title ==
There is only one reference to a 'sandcastle' in the book. From Iris Murdoch's The Sandcastle, Chapter Five:

"I can recall, as a child, seeing pictures in English children's books of boys and girls playing on the sand and making sandcastles – and I tried to play on my sand. But a Mediterranean beach is not a place for playing on. It is dirty and very dry. The tides never wash the sand or make it firm. When I tried to make a sandcastle, the sand would just run away between my fingers. It was too dry to hold together. And even as I poured sea water over it, the sun would dry it up at once."

== Adaptations ==
William Ingram adapted it as a television drama in 1963.
