= Sorry, Wrong Number (1958 film) =

- SMH ad from 16 Jun 1958
- Genre: thriller
- Based on: Sorry, Wrong Number; 1943 radio play by Lucille Fletcher
- Written by: Philip Albright
- Directed by: Raymond Menmuir
- Starring: Georgie Sterling
- Country of origin: Australia
- Original language: English

Production
- Running time: 35 mins
- Production company: ABC

Original release
- Network: ABC
- Release: June 18, 1958 (Sydney, live)
- Release: July 24, 1958 (Melbourne, taped)

Sorry, Wrong Number is a 1958 Australian television play based on Lucille Fletcher's radio play Sorry, Wrong Number. It starred Georgie Sterling.

It was one of several thrillers filmed in the early days of Australian television.

== Plot ==
The bed-ridden Mrs Stevenson hears on a telephone, due to crossed wires, that a murder is being plotted to occur tonight. She calls various people in a desperate attempt to get someone to believe her story. As the night goes on, she becomes increasingly concerned that the victim may be someone she knows.

== Cast ==
- Georgie Sterling as Mrs Stevenson
- Del Furze
- Derani Scarr
- Pat Binstead
- Bonnie Walker
- John Llewelyn
- John Bluthal
- Al Garcia
- Wayne Polzin
- Dorothy Whiteley
- Eric Reiman

== Production ==
Sterling had performed in the play on radio in 1948.

Ray Menmuir directed. Menmuir had only just finished directing Murder Story for the ABC.

== Follow Up ==
The ABC subsequently broadcast another one person play on television, Box for One.
