= David Jacobs (broadcaster) =

British broadcaster (1926–2013)

David Jacobs CBE
- Born: David Lewis Jacobs; 19 May 1926; Streatham Hill, London, England
- Died: 2 September 2013 (aged 87); Sussex, England
- Occupation: Broadcaster
- Years active: 1944–2013
- Spouses: Patricia Bradlaw (m. 1949; div. 1972) Caroline Munro (m. 1975, died 1975) Lindsay Stuart-Hutcheson (m. 1979)
- Children: 4
- Parent(s): David Jacobs Sr (father); Jeanette Jacobs (mother)

David Lewis Jacobs CBE (19 May 1926 – 2 September 2013) was a British broadcaster. He was the presenter of the BBC Television series Juke Box Jury in the 1960s, and chaired the long-running BBC Radio 4 topical discussion series Any Questions? His earlier radio work included small acting parts: over the years he played himself or the characters of presenters in film, television and radio productions. Jacobs finally stepped down as a BBC Radio 2 presenter shortly before his death in 2013, his career having spanned more than 65 years.

== Early life and career ==
Jacobs was born to a Jewish family, the youngest of three sons of Jeanette and David Jacobs senior, in Streatham Hill, London, and educated at Belmont College and Strand School. In his early years the family was affluent, but his father, a Covent Garden fruit importer, was bankrupted in 1939 after suffering ill-health for a decade, and the family soon lost their home. This forced his youngest son to leave school at 14, and Jacobs took up various short-term jobs, before he served in the Royal Navy from 1944 to 1947, and performed on the popular BBC General Forces Programme Navy Mixture in 1944. He became an announcer with the British Forces Broadcasting Service and was chief announcer on Radio SEAC in Ceylon (1945–47). Jacobs was later assistant station director.

A BBC staff announcer in the early 1950s, his voice intoned the title for many of the 53 episodes of the space adventure series Journey Into Space. He played 22 parts in the series. He voiced Tigger in the 1952 puppet show adaptation of Winnie-the-Pooh. In 1953 he acted as the host for Jazz Club. He also broadcast on Radio Luxembourg. He had, between 1957 and 1961, established the chart show format of the BBC Light Programme's Pick of the Pops, to which he briefly returned in 1962. Between 1957 and 1966, he presented A Song for Europe and provided the UK commentary at Eurovision Song Contests.

In 1958, he narrated the short film Elizabeth Allan Goes Shopping, a BFI film in which Allan is seen promoting the Harrods store.

Jacobs presented Juke Box Jury on BBC television between 1959 and 1967. This was a weekly show in which a guest panel reviewed newly released pop records and forecast whether each would become a "hit" or a "miss". By 1962 the programme attracted 12 million viewers weekly on Saturday nights. He was one of the four original presenters of Top of the Pops when it began in 1964, but remained a presenter of the programme for only its first two years. "I became too square for the pop scene", he once commented.

In 1963 he published an autobiography, Jacobs' Ladder.

== From the late 1960s to 1984 ==
Most of Jacobs's career after the late 1960s was at BBC Radio 2, although in the early days of BBC Radio 1, which opened in September 1967, he had a late programme on Sundays. Though a Radio 1 show, this was broadcast on Radios 1 and 2 and consisted of easy listening music and interviews with guests. From December 1967 until July 1984, Jacobs chaired the Radio 4 topical debate programme Any Questions?. During the 1980s, he hosted a TV series with a similar format, called Questions, for viewers in south and south-east England, made by and shown on TVS, the ITV franchise holder in the region at the time. He hosted the panel game What's My Line? when it was revived on BBC2 from 1973 to 1974. In 1973 he hosted a short-lived version of the American game show The Who, What or Where Game.

Jacobs appeared as himself in the 1974 film Stardust, compèring a 1960s award ceremony. He also appeared as himself in an episode of the BBC sitcom Some Mothers Do 'Ave 'Em alongside Michael Crawford, presenting a fictional home-improvement show.

In 1984, he received the Sony Gold Award for his outstanding contribution to radio over the years (and was subsequently admitted to the Sony Hall of Fame). He also achieved the Richard Martin Award for exceptional service in the cause of animal welfare. In the same year, Jacobs was appointed Representative Deputy Lieutenant for the Royal Borough of Kingston, a position he held over the following 17 years. On his retirement from this position he became High Steward of Kingston.

== Later career ==
Between January 1985 and December 1991, Jacobs presented a daily lunchtime programme on Radio 2 of what he characterised as "our kind of music", much of it popular tunes from musical theatre. Jacobs subsequently presented a weekly programme following a similar format, for a time on Saturday evening and later on Fridays, although the show finished airing in early 1999. He also presented Radio 2's long-running Sunday programme Melodies for You from 1974 to 1984.

By now one of the station's oldest presenters, he hosted a Sunday late-night easy listening show from 1998 until 2013, The David Jacobs Collection, showcasing songs from Hollywood, Broadway and Tin Pan Alley and continuing the "our kind of music" theme. The programme regularly featured recordings by Matt Monro, Frank Sinatra, Judy Garland, Ella Fitzgerald, Sammy Davis Jr., Vic Damone and Robert Preston among others and its signature tune was an instrumental version of Cole Porter's "I Love You, Samantha" from High Society.

On television, Jacobs was a regular Dictionary Corner guest on Channel 4's popular quiz show Countdown between 1993 and 2001, making 62 guest appearances in all on the programme.

In a revival of the 1950s show Journey into Space, he played the lead role of Jet Morgan in Frozen in Time on BBC Radio 4 on 12 April 2008, and he played The Host in The Host on BBC Radio 4 on 27 June 2009.

DJs Stuart Maconie and Mark Radcliffe recruited Jacobs in 2008 to introduce album tracks from Cream on their weekday evening Radio 2 show under the rubric "Jacobs's Cream Crackers", an allusion to a brand of biscuit. In 2010, he provided soundbites for Chris Evans's breakfast show, and chose a record each Thursday. This followed the success of his choice of Maurice Chevalier's I'm Gonna Shine Today as a song to play on the programme.

During the first half of 2012, while Jacobs was recovering from two major operations, he continued to be heard each Sunday on BBC Radio 2, which broadcast repeats of The David Jacobs Collection and Frank Sinatra: Voice of the Century, presented by Jacobs in 1998. He returned to his regular Sunday night slot with The David Jacobs Collection on 8 July 2012.

On 22 July 2013 Jacobs announced that he was stepping down as presenter of his Radio 2 show, citing ill health. His last show was broadcast on 4 August 2013. He said, "I will not stop collecting but my sadness will be that I cannot share them with all my loyal listeners. But rest assured, I will be back from time to time." He was replaced in this slot by Don Black.

He had been involved since its inception in Kingston's Rose Theatre, of which he was life president. He was vice-patron of the charity Advance Centre for the Scotson Technique, and patron of the Disabled Photographers' Society. Jacobs was also a lifelong friend of Dame Vera Lynn and was Vice President of her charity, The Dame Vera Lynn Trust for Children with Cerebral Palsy. He was also involved in the Celebrities Guild, which Michael Freedland described as "a kind of Jewish Variety Club", and regularly spoke at "ordinary suburban synagogues".

== Personal life ==
In 1949 Jacobs married Patricia Bradlaw, with whom he had three daughters and a son, but their marriage collapsed in 1969, and the couple finally divorced in 1972. Their actress daughter Emma Jacobs featured in The Stud (1978), a film in which she played Alex Khaled, daughter of Fontaine Khaled (Joan Collins). Jacobs' marriage to Lindsay Stuart-Hutcheson lasted from 1979 until his death in 2013.

His life was marred by several tragic events. Jeremy, his 19-year-old son, was killed in Israel in 1972 in a car accident while engaged in charity work. In 1975, Jacobs survived a car accident in Spain in which his pregnant second wife, Caroline (née Munro), whom he had married earlier that year, and Caroline Marsh, wife of politician Richard Marsh, were killed. With journalist Sue Freeman, he co-wrote a memoir of her, Caroline (1978).

Jacobs died at home at the age of 87 on 2 September 2013, surrounded by his family. He had been suffering from Parkinson's disease and had also been treated for liver cancer since at least 2011.

Preceded by Tom Sloan	Eurovision Song Contest UK Commentator; 1960	Succeeded by Tom Sloan
Preceded by Tom Sloan	Eurovision Song Contest UK Commentator; 1962 – 1966	Succeeded by Rolf Harris
