= One Bright Day (play) =

Stage play written by Sigmund Miller

- Written by: Sigmund Miller

Premiere
- Date: March 19, 1952
- Place: Royale Theatre, New York City
- Directed by: Michael Gordon

One Bright Day is a stage play written by Sigmund Miller. It has been adapted for television at least three times.

== Robert Montgomery Presents ==
A version aired as part of American anthology series Robert Montgomery Presents, on October 29, 1956. A 60-minute series, the episode likely ran between 47 and 50 minutes excluding the commercials (exact running time unknown). Cast included Katherine Anderson, Sidney Blackmer, House Jameson, Norma Moore, and Robert Webber.

== ITV Television Playhouse ==
A version aired as part of British anthology series ITV Television Playhouse, on 6 December 1956, and re-titled The Lion's Share. A 60-minute series, the exact running time excluding commercials is unknown. Cast included Alan Gifford, Betty McDowall, William Franklyn, Henry Kendall, Vincent Holman, Al Mulock, George Ricarde, Rita Stevens, Victor Wood, Mark Bellamy, Don Gilliland, and Maurice Durant. This version is missing, believed lost.

== 1959 Australian TV version ==
A version aired on Australian television in 1959 on non-commercial broadcaster ABC.

The adaptation was done by Alan Seymour.

Broadcast live in Sydney on 7 October 1959, a kinescope was made of the broadcast and shown in Melbourne on 30 December 1959. (It is not known if it was shown on ABC's then-new stations in Brisbane and Adelaide). 75 minutes in duration.<ref"All the TV Programmes". ABC Weekly. 7 October 1959. p. 31.</ref>

It is not known if the kinescope recording of this version still exists or not.

Star Joe McCormick was an American actor.

=== Cast ===
- Joe McCormick as Julian Prescott, the president of the company
- Kevin Sanders as George Lawrence, the general manager
- Patricia Kerr as Margot Prescott, the president's daughter
- Eric Gormley as Fred Newbury, a lawyer
- Julian Flett
- Georgie Sterling
- Nigel Lovell
- Eve Hardwicke
- Carlotta Kalmar
- Laurie Lange
- John Llewellyn
- Al Thomas.

== See also ==
- List of live television plays broadcast on Australian Broadcasting Corporation (1950s)

== See also ==
- Miss Mabel
- Black Limelight
