= The Price of Fear (radio serial) =

British radio series

The Price of Fear is a horror/mystery radio series produced by BBC Radio between 1973 and 1983. The host and star of the show was Vincent Price.

This show stands out in Price's radio career as some of the episodes are based on fictional adventures of Vincent Price himself, in which Price plays himself, while others have him merely introducing the macabre tale of the week. Twenty-two episodes were produced. Credited writers and source authors for the series include William Ingram, Stanley Ellin, Richard Davis, R. Chetwynd-Hayes, A. M. Burrage, Elizabeth Morgan, Rene Basilico, and Roald Dahl. Fifteen of the episodes were rebroadcast by BBC Radio 7 in the spring of 2010. They have periodically been repeated on the station (now rebranded BBC Radio 4 Extra) since then.

== Episodes ==
1. Remains to be Seen by William Ingram (based on the story by Jack Ritchie)
  co-starring Mervyn Johns, Clive Swift, Avril Angers, Michael Gwynn
2. William and Mary by Barry Campbell (based on the story by Roald Dahl)
3. Cat's Cradle by Richard Davis (based on "The Squaw" by Bram Stoker)
  co-starring Kenneth J. Warren, Frederick Schrecker
4. Meeting in Athens by Maurice Travers (based on "So Cold, So Pale, So Fair" by Charles Birkin)
  co-starring Michael Deacon
5. The Man Who Hated Scenes by William Ingram (based on the story by Robert Arthur)
  co-starring Peter Cushing, Dianna Olsson
6. Lot 132 by Elizabeth Morgan
7. The Waxwork by Barry Campbell (based on the story by A. M. Burrage)
  co-starring Peter Barkworth, Joan Cooper, Cyril Shaps, Christopher H. Bidmead
8. Fish by Rene Basilico
9. Soul Music by William Ingram
  co-starring Coral Browne
10. Guy Fawkes' Night by Richard Davies
11. Come As You Are by William Ingram
12. Speciality of the House (based on the story by Stanley Ellin)
  co-starring Hugh Burden, Francis de Wolfe
13. The Ninth Removal (based on the story by R. Chetwynd-Hayes)
  co-starring Freda Jackson, Richard Pearson, Alan Rowe
14. An Eye for An Eye by William Ingram
15. Blind Man’s Bluff by William Ingram
16. Never Gamble With A Loser (probably not recorded)
17. Goody Two Shoes by William Ingram
18. To My Dear, Dear Saladin by William Ingram
19. The Family Album by William Ingram
20. Not Wanted on Voyage by William Ingram
21. Out of the Mouths by William Ingram
22. Is There Anybody There? by William Ingram
