= Black Limelight (play) =

Black Limelight is a stage play by Gordon Sherry, which has been adapted for television at least four times. However, at least three of these adaptations are now lost.

== Plot ==
Peter Charrington is a married commercial traveller who has been having an affair with a girl. When she is found murdered he is accused of the crime and his wife Mary has to prove his innocence.

== 1952 version ==
A version aired as part of British series BBC Sunday Night Theatre. Cast included Jack Allen, Victor Baring, Gladys Boot, Fanny Carby, Patrick Desmond, Nora Gordon, John Howlett, Barry Letts, Alun Owen, Margaret Rawlings, John Robinson and Brian Wilde. Two performances were broadcast, on 1 June 1952 and a few days later on 5 June. Neither of these two performances had their live broadcasts recorded, and as such are lost.

== 1956 version ==
A version aired as part of British series Armchair Theatre on 30 September 1956, made by ABC Weekend TV for ITV. Cast included Betty Henderson, Charles Houston, David Williams, Hilary Paterson, John Robinson, John Welsh, Rosalie Crutchley and Victor Brooks. This version is also lost.

== 1959 Australian TV version ==
A version aired on Australian broadcaster ABC in 1959. Broadcast live in Melbourne on 15 July 1959, a kinescope ("telerecording") was made of the broadcast, and was later shown in Sydney on 22 July 1959. It ran for 75 minutes.

=== Cast ===
- Bruce Beeby as Peter Charrington
- Patricia Kennedy as Mary Charrington
- Diana Bell
- Moira Carleton
- Frank Gatliff as the family lawyer
- Ken Goodlet
- Laurie Lange
- Joy Mitchell
- Beverley Phillips
- Nevil Thurgood.

It is not known if the kinescope recording still exists.

=== Reception ===
The Sydney Morning Herald said Kennedy's "remarkable dramatic strength" in her part "did much to minimise the gimmicky construction of thriller plot and some lack of incisive editing in" the play saying Kennedy "brought a wide range of understanding, emotion and keen professional attack to the role".

== 1962 version ==
A version aired as part of British series BBC Sunday-Night Play on 14 January 1962. Cast included Michael Aldridge, Renée Asherson, Neville Barber, Susan Burnet, Robert Cawdron, Edward Evans, Dudley Foster, Gretchen Franklin, Allan McClelland, Charles Simon and Nigel Stock. This version is also lost.

== See also ==
- Miss Mabel
- Box for One
- One Bright Day
- List of live television plays broadcast on Australian Broadcasting Corporation (1950s)
