= Space Force (BBC radio serial) =

1984-1985 BBC Radio science fiction serial

Space Force is a BBC Radio science fiction serial, broadcast from 4 April 1984 to 17 June 1985.

Written by Charles Chilton, it was originally intended to be a sequel to his Journey into Space series (broadcast in the 1950s), using the cast which had just made a one-off revival of that series ("The Return From Mars"); while this idea was dropped late in the development of the serial, the four characters are nevertheless essentially the same as those from the 1950s series, albeit with different names.

== First series (Space Force) ==
The episodes of the first series, broadcast in 1984, were:

1. "The Voice from Nowhere" (4 April 1984)
2. "Towards the Unknown" (11 April 1984)
3. "The Silver Strangers" (18 April 1984)
4. "The Time Ship" (25 April 1984)
5. "Threshold of the Stars" (2 May 1984)
6. "Marooned in Space" (9 May 1984)

== Second series (Space Force 2) ==
The episodes of the second series, broadcast in 1985, were:

1. "The Return of the Sun God" (13 May 1985)
2. "The Red Planet" (20 May 1985)
3. "The Great Martian Pyramid" (27 May 1985)
4. "A Test of Endurance" (3 June 1985)
5. "Living with Death" (10 June 1985)
6. "Unto Death – And Beyond" (17 June 1985)

== Characters ==
The main characters in Space Force were:

Character	Actor	Equivalent character from Journey into Space	Description
Captain Saxon Berry	Barry Foster	Jet Morgan	Captain of the Space Force and leader of the team. Also captained the Lunar 9 freighter for the first episode of the first series before being transferred to the Space Force.
Lodderick Sincere	Tony Osoba	Steven Mitchell	The flight engineer for Space Force, a keen astronomer who sometimes is hot-headed enough to get himself and the team into trouble.
Lemuel "Chipper" Barnet	Nicky Henson	Lemmy Barnet	The radio operator for Space Force. The joker of the group who also struggles with the terrifying situations the team face. In a direct link to Journey into Space, Chipper refers once to his grandfather, Lemmy Barnett.
Professor Magnus Carter	Nigel Stock	Doc Matthews	Added to the Lunar 9 crew under somewhat mysterious circumstances, Magnus is part of a secret organisation searching for extraterrestrial intelligence.

== Music ==
Both the first and second series reused commercially available incidental music by Jerry Goldsmith. Cues from Logan's Run, Outland, Twilight Zone: The Movie and Capricorn One can be heard in series one, while music from The Wind and the Lion, Star Trek: The Motion Picture, Poltergeist, Gremlins, Coma, and Alien can be heard in series two.
