= Aiello (company) =

Taiwanese start-up company

Aiello is a smart speaker firm established in 2019. Aiello was the first Taiwanese company to provide artificial intelligence in the hospitality industry. One of the founders formerly worked in the Smart Speaker department at Google.

The company's AI technology is deployed across Millennium Hotels and Resorts properties in Singapore, Malaysia and Thailand, as well as new locations in New York, United States.

The five-star resort Fleur de Chine Hotel integrated the Aiello AI Call Agent (ACA) to automate the handling of guest telephone inquiries and service requests.

== History ==
- March 2026: Obtained ISO/IEC 27001 certification

== See also ==
- Google Nest (smart speakers)
