= Piero Aiello =

Italian politician (born 1956)

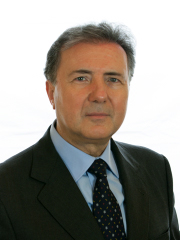
- Piero Aiello in 2013.
- Born: 30 June 1956 (age 69); Ardore, Calabria, Italy
- Occupation: Politician
- Political party: Forza Italia (From 2017); Previously: DC (Until 1994); CCD (1994-1999); FI (1999-2009); PdL (2009-2013); NCD (2013-2017); AP (2017)

Piero Aiello (born 30 June 1956) is an Italian politician from the New Centre-Right. Since 2013, he serves as Senator of the Parliament of Italy representing Calabria.

== Biography ==
=== Political activity ===
In 1994, he joined the Christian Democratic Centre. In 1999 he moved to Forza Italia and then to the Il Popolo Della Liberta (transl. The People of Freedom), and then joined the New Centre Right in 2013 and then to Alternative Popular.

=== Regional Councilor of Calabria ===
In the 1995, in the regional elections in Calabria, he was elected councilor of the province of Catanzaro.

In 1999, he abandoned the CCD and joined Forza Italia, re-nominated for the 2000 regional election, was re-elected as a councilor and was then reconfirmed also for the 2005 regional elections.

At the 2010 regional election, he was elected councilor for the fourth time, and was then appointed regional councilor in the council led by Giuseppe Scopelliti.

=== Election as Senator ===
In the 2013 Italian general election, he was elected to the Senate of the Republic, in the Calabria region.

On November 16, 2013, with the suspension of the activities of the People of Freedom, he joined the New Center-right led by Angelino Alfano.

On March 18, 2017, with the dissolution of the New Center Right, it merges into the Popular Alternative.

On December 29, 2017, he abandoned the Popular Alternative and joined Forza Italia.

In the 2018 Italian general election, he was reappointed to the Senate in the single-member constituency of Catanzaro, but was narrowly defeated by the M5S candidate Gelsomina Vono, therefore not being re-elected.
