= William Ingram (writer) =

Welsh writer (1930–2013)

- Born: William Herbert Ingram; 1930 Resolven, Glamorgan, Wales, United Kingdom
- Died: January 29, 2013 (aged 82–83) Ogmore Valley, Bridgend, Wales
- Occupation: Dramatist and actor
- Language: English
- Citizenship: United Kingdom

William Herbert Ingram (1930 – 29 January 2013) was a Welsh writer and actor who had success in television and radio. He performed in his own plays for radio.

== Childhood and education ==
William Ingram, widely known as Bill Ingram except on stage and on the page, was born in Resolven, Glamorgan, Wales in 1930, to Louisa May (née Snook) and William J. Ingram. Six years later the family moved to Ogmore Vale, where he attended Ogmore Grammar School.

== Early career ==
Singled out early as one of two 'tip-top' Welsh actors – with Mervyn Johns – for his role as the Dutch student Karl in the 1955 'new British colour film', The Blue Peter, in a review in the Western Mail the two actors were described as 'among the best things in the film'...'Young Mr Ingram rapidly established himself as the best of our young performers, bringing an altogether delightful charm to his many scenes.' It was not his only admired performance in 1955. Appearing on stage in the Jubilee production of Peter Pan at Birmingham's Alexandra Theatre, The Birmingham Daily Post described him as a 'notable Slightly', fifty years after the character's first appearance on stage. The production, and Ingram, would transfer to London's Scala Theatre that Christmas.

The following year saw Ingram join the 1956 company at Regent's Park Open Air Theatre in London where he took a role that would prove key to his development as a writer. Feste is the clown or fool in Shakespeare's comedy Twelfth Night. He brings the play to an end with the famous song The rain it raineth every day – With hey, ho, the wind and the rain. It would give him the inspiration for his first stage play.

In the meantime he took on the title role of Alfred Wendham in Rediffusion's television production of E. F. Benson's The Hanging of Alfred Wendham, with the actor Patrick McGoohan in the supporting cast. Ingram would appear in a supporting role in McGoohan's long-running series Danger Man nine years later.

Ingram continued to work as an actor, but a major change was signalled when his first play, The Rain it Raineth, was presented at the Hampstead Theatre Club in London, in 1959. An outlying challenge to London's established theatres at the time, it was a venue for new voices. Ingram's play was reviewed by the major critics and directed by the theatre's founder, James Roose-Evans. From the Shakespeare Memorial Theatre in Stratford-upon-Avon, the actor Trader Faulkner was cast as the struggling actor in the lead role. In an era of Angry young men, one article was headlined Not Angry. The Stage review was headlined, Portrait of a Frustrated Actor. One of the eminent critics of the day, J.C. Trewin, wrote: 'In effect, William Ingram's first play is a play of hope, though I doubt very much if it would encourage anybody to be an actor. But it does offer hope for the dramatist's future. He writes with a fluency that will be valuable when he softens his all too realistic idiom and becomes selective.'

Critical reservations of a 'too realistic idiom' aside, Ingram had found his metier. During the 1960s, while continuing to work in television and the theatre, he also found his medium. Radio would offer him room to write stories, dramas, comedies, horror and adoptions, beginning in 1966 and continuing into the 2000s.

== Dramatic works and performances ==
Ingram was a writer for the 1980s British television series, The District Nurse. He also played the ghost of Dylan Thomas in the televised version of A Solitary Mister.

In the six-part TV series Target Luna (1960), Ingram played the part of Flt. Lt. Williams. He appeared in a number of ITV television plays and he wrote 12 episodes for in the BBC television series The District Nurse, produced by BBC Wales and shown on BBC One. He also played the part of Band chairman in an episode.

It was at BBC Radio drama that Ingram found his home, performing, reading and writing for credits in the hundred, including roles in many of the plays and dramatisations that he had written. A radio version of Emlyn Williams's Night Must Fall, in which he took the leading role of Danny opposite Dame Sybil Thorndike, is held in the British Library's Sound Archive.

Among Ingram's dramatic contributions to radio are his scripts for the 1970s radio series, The Price of Fear which starred the Hollywood actor Vincent Price. The series, which used Price's association with horror to bring a chill to radio, began on the BBC World Service in 1973 and continued on BBC Radio 4 into the 1980s. Of the 22 episodes, twelve were written by Ingram.

Ingram adapted Iris Murdoch's novel The Sandcastle for television in 1963. Bourne described Ingram's work as having, "skirted marvelously well the traps and quicksands. The plot was tightened but not falsified; the characters were blunter, as they must be in television,... but they were not fundamentally altered... First rate performance by Charles Carson... thundering good story... compelling play."
