= Bruce Beeby =

Australian actor (1921–2013)

- Born: Bruce Edward Beeby; 21 October 1921; Sydney, Australia
- Died: 20 October 2013 (aged 91)
- Occupation: Actor
- Years active: c.1945–?
- Spouse: Madi Hedd

Bruce Edward Beeby (21 October 1921 – 20 October 2013) was an Australian actor who worked primarily in British films and television. He was probably best known for portraying Stephen "Mitch" Mitchell in the 1950s BBC radio serials Journey into Space.

In the late-1950s, he appeared in several live plays for Australian television, including Ending It, Rope, In the Zone, Shadow of Doubt, Sixty Point Bold, Citizen of Westminster, and Black Limelight. He also compered quiz shows.

He was married to actress Madi Hedd. They acted together in Britain for six years before returning to Australia in 1957.

== Selected filmography ==
- Harvest Gold (1945) – Harry Johnson
- Women of Twilight (1952) – Minor Role (uncredited)
- The Intruder (1953) – 2nd Detective
- The Limping Man (1953) – Kendall Brown
- Impulse (1954) – Harry Winters
- Front Page Story (1954) – Counsel for the Defence
- Johnny on the Spot (1954) – Terry Dunn
- The Golden Link (1954) – Sgt. Baker
- Time Is My Enemy (1954) – Roommate (uncredited)
- Profile (1954) – (uncredited)
- Radio Cab murder (1954) – Inspector Rawlings
- The Teckman Mystery (1954) – Wallace
- Malaga (1954) – Potts
- The Glass Cage (1955) – 'Doctor' Treating Sapolio (uncredited)
- A Kid for Two Farthings (1955) – Policeman (uncredited)
- The Man in the Road (1956) – Dr. Manning
- Child in the House (1956) – Policeman
- Stranger in Town (1957) – William Ryland
- The Man in the Road (1957) – Macauley's Solicitor
- Smiley Gets a Gun (1958) – Dr. Gaspen
- Escort for Hire (1960) – Det. Sgt. Moore
- Payroll (1961) – Worth
- Pit of Darkness (1961) – Peter Mayhew
- A Matter of WHO (1961) – Capt. Brook
- Fate Takes a Hand (1961) – Inspector Phillips
- Serena (1962) – Det. Sergeant Conway
- Lawrence of Arabia (1962) – Captain at Officer's Club (uncredited)
- It's All Happening (1963) – Announcer
- The Devil-Ship Pirates (1964) – Pedro, a pirate
- A Hard Day's Night (1964) – Man Talking to Casino Manager (uncredited)
- Hammerhead (1968) – British Secret Service Guard (uncredited)
- Midas Run (1969) – Gordon
- Wuthering Heights (1970)
