= Tony Aiello (American football) =

American football player (1921–2012)

Profile
- Position: Back

Personal information
- Born: April 28, 1921; Monongahela, Pennsylvania
- Died: February 24, 2012 (aged 90); Norwalk, Ohio
- Listed height: 5 ft 6 in (1.68 m)
- Listed weight: 165 lb (75 kg)

Career information
- High school: Brookfield (OH)
- College: Youngstown

Career history
- Brooklyn Tigers (1944); Detroit Lions (1944)

Career statistics
- Games: 5
- Stats at Pro Football Reference

Anthony Samuel Aiello (April 28, 1921 – February 24, 2012) was an American football player.

Aiello was born in 1921 in Monongahela, Pennsylvania. He attended Brookfield High School in Ohio. He played college football as a halfback for Youngstown from 1939 to 1942.

In 1944, he joined the Detroit Lions of the National Football League (NFL). He appeared in four games for the Lions, carrying the ball only six times for 22 yards. He was waived by the Lions in early November 1944. One day after being released by the Lions, he signed with the Brooklyn Tigers. He appeared in only one game with no carries for Brooklyn.

Aiello died in 2012 in Norwalk, Ohio.
