= Ending It =

1957 television film directed by William Sterling

Ending It is a 1939 BBC TV one-off play, written by Val Gielgud, and starring John Robinson, Joan Marion, and Dino Galvani. It was 30 minutes in duration. It was broadcast live on 25 August 1939.

== 1957 Australian adaptation ==
Ending It
- Written by: Val Gielgud; Hugh Stewart
- Directed by: William Sterling
- Starring: Bruce Beeby; Madi Hedd
- Country of origin: Australia
- Original language: English

Production
- Running time: 60 mins

Original release
- Release: 19 June 1957 (Sydney, live)
- Release: 19 July 1957 (Melbourne, recording)

The most unusual aspect of the production was that it was later remade for Australian television in 1957 at a time when Australian drama production was rare. It was directed by William Sterling.

Broadcast live on Sydney station ABN-2 on 19 June 1957, a kinescope was made of the broadcast and shown on Melbourne television station ABV-2 on 19 July 1957. It is not known if the kinescope recording still exists.

=== Cast ===
- Bruce Beeby
- Madi Hedd
- Keith Buckley

=== Production ===
Bruce Beeby and Madi Hedd were married in real life. They made this shortly after returning to Australia from six years in Britain.

Thelma Afford did the design.

== See also ==
- Tomorrow's Child - 1957 Australian television play.
- The Passionate Pianist - 1957 Australian television play.
- Box for One - 1958 Australian play, based on a 1949 BBC television play.
- List of live television plays broadcast on the Australian Broadcasting Corporation (1956–1969)
