= Tony Aiello =

American television reporter

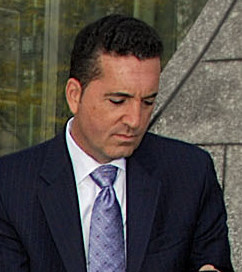
- Aiello in Stamford, CT, Oct. 2007
- Born: March 6, 1963 (age 63)
- Education: Indiana University
- Occupation: Journalist
- Spouse: Elizabeth Aiello
- Children: 2
- Website: www.cbsnews.com/newyork/personality/tony-aiello/

Tony Aiello (born March 6, 1963) is a television reporter for WCBS-TV in New York City. He joined the station in October, 2002 after spending more than four years at WNBC New York. After almost a decade covering the northern suburbs from the WCBS-TV bureau in White Plains, New York, Aiello now is based at the CBS Broadcast Center in Manhattan.

Aiello came to New York in 1996 to work for WBIS+, a new station started by Dow Jones & Company. Prior to New York, he worked at network affiliates WITI in Milwaukee, WI and WTVF in Nashville, Tennessee, which is where he began using the name "Tony" on-air. Prior to Nashville, at jobs in Greenville, South Carolina, Charlottesville, Virginia, and Winchester, Virginia, Aiello used his given name, "Carm".

Aiello graduated from Indiana University in 1985 with a degree in telecommunications. At IU he was a brother of the Phi Kappa Psi fraternity. He also was a member of the prestigious Indiana University Student Foundation Steering Committee.

In 2006, Aiello appeared in an episode of Snapped on the Oxygen Network to comment on the case of a woman accused of stabbing her husband. He also has appeared on Court TV to discuss high-profile criminal cases he has covered.

On the day of the September 11 attacks, Aiello and his wife were among the "plane people" on 38 aircraft diverted to Gander, Newfoundland and Labrador.

Aiello is active in the Westchester County, New York arts scene. He has been a board member of ArtsWestchester and the Westchester Philharmonic.

Aiello's wife Elizabeth was formerly a senior vice president at Martha Stewart Living Omnimedia and currently with Sirius XM Holdings. The couple has two children and reside in Harrison, New York.
