= Sorry, Wrong Number =

1948 film by Anatole Litvak

- Theatrical release poster
- Directed by: Anatole Litvak
- Screenplay by: Lucille Fletcher
- Based on: Sorry, Wrong Number; 1943 radio play by Lucille Fletcher
- Produced by: Anatole Litvak; Hal B. Wallis
- Starring: Barbara Stanwyck; Burt Lancaster
- Cinematography: Sol Polito
- Edited by: Warren Low
- Music by: Franz Waxman
- Production company: Hal Wallis Productions
- Distributed by: Paramount Pictures
- Release date: September 1, 1948
- Running time: 89 minutes
- Country: United States
- Language: English
- Box office: $2.8 million (U.S. rentals)

Sorry, Wrong Number is a 1948 American noir thriller tragedy film directed by Anatole Litvak, from a screenplay by Lucille Fletcher, based on her 1943 radio play of the same title.

The film stars Barbara Stanwyck and Burt Lancaster. It follows a bedridden woman who, while on a telephone circuit, overhears men plotting the murder of an unknown individual. By phone, she tries to contact switchboard operators, police, and others who might help her prevent the crime. Stanwyck was nominated for the Academy Award for Best Actress.

It is one of the few pre-1950 Paramount Pictures films which remained in the studio's library (the rest are currently owned by NBCUniversal).

== Radio play ==
Lucille Fletcher's play originally aired on the Suspense radio program on May 25, 1943, essentially a one-woman show with Agnes Moorehead as Mrs. Stevenson.

=== Plot ===
Mrs. Stevenson, an imperious invalid, accidentally intercepts a phone call between two men plotting a murder for that evening. She tries to enlist the help of the telephone operator, the police, and a hospital, becoming more frantic as the time passes. In the final moments of the play, she realizes that she is the intended victim.

=== Broadcast history ===
The play was performed seven more times, on August 21 of the same year and again in 1944, 1945, 1948, 1952, 1957 and 1960. The final broadcast was on February 14, 1960. Orson Welles called Sorry, Wrong Number "the greatest single radio script ever written". In 2014, the broadcast was deemed "culturally, historically, or aesthetically significant" by the Library of Congress and selected for inclusion in the National Recording Registry.

== Film version ==
The film version of Sorry, Wrong Number is about three times as long as the original radio play and includes flashbacks to previous events in Mrs. Stevenson's life and marriage, as well as scenes showing events involving other characters.

In the film, Leona Stevenson is a spoiled, bedridden daughter of wealthy businessman James Cotterell. Using her phone, she tries to reach her husband, Henry. The servants are absent and she is alone in the apartment. On a crossed telephone connection, she overhears two men planning a murder. The call is cut off without Leona learning much, other than the deed is scheduled for that night at exactly 11:15 when a train will be passing by the murder location, drowning out any screams of the person being murdered. When she calls the telephone company and the police, they do not believe her about the murder.

While attempting to reach Henry, Leona recalls her past. She learns through his secretary that Henry met that day with an attractive woman named Sally Lord and did not return to the office. Leona recognizes the woman as Sally Hunt, a college friend in love with Henry, who at the time was poor and working in a drugstore. Leona took Henry from Sally, and married him against her father's wishes. Sally later married Fred Lord, a lawyer in the district attorney's office. From overheard conversations, Sally learns her husband was close to resolving an investigation about Henry. Sally is concerned; she follows Henry and two associates to a mysterious meeting of three men, including Henry, at an abandoned house on Staten Island. The house sign indicates the owner is Waldo Evans, later revealed to be a chemist working for Leona's father. Sally arranged to meet Henry to warn him about what she had seen, but he received a phone call, left the table and did not return. Sally later learns that the house was destroyed, Morano—an apparent gangster—has been arrested by the police, and Waldo escaped them.

Leona receives a message from Henry, stating he left town to complete some work he had forgotten about and will return on Sunday. Leona calls Dr. Phillip Alexander, the specialist she came to New York to see regarding her lifelong heart troubles. Alexander reveals that he gave Henry her prognosis ten days ago, something Henry kept from her. A flashback shows Leona had occasional cardiac episodes for a number of years before she married Henry, something Henry realized a few years into their marriage, when she suffered a cardiac arrest during a quarrel. It becomes clear Leona tries to use Henry, insisting he work for her father even though he is bored. As their troubles become severe, Leona's attacks become more frequent until she is bedridden. However, Alexander diagnoses the problems as purely psychosomatic. Nothing is wrong with her physically, but he thinks she needs psychiatric help.

Waldo calls Leona with a message for Henry. He discloses that Henry recruited him to steal chemicals from the Cotterell Drug Company and sell them for Morano. Henry tried to bypass Morano when Waldo was transferred; however, Morano coerced Henry into signing an IOU for $200,000 in three months to compensate for a lost profit. When Henry protested that he had insufficient money, Morano pointed out that Leona had a large insurance policy. With Morano in custody, Waldo stresses that Henry no longer needs to raise the sum. He gives Leona a number to reach Henry, but when she calls she discovers it is the city morgue.

At 11:00 p.m., the distraught Leona calls the hospital requesting a private nurse, but is told they can't provide her with one. Henry calls Leona from a telephone booth at a train station as she hears an intruder lurking inside the house. Leona tells Henry she knows about his stealing from her father's company, that Waldo has conveyed that there is no longer any need for Henry to obtain the money (from Leona's life insurance) and that she knows she is the victim of the murder plot. A now frantic Henry tells Leona she has 3 minutes to get to the open window in her bedroom and scream as loudly as she can for the police. Paralyzed by fear due to the intruder approaching her bedroom, Leona is unable to move, and hangs up the phone before she is strangled to death as a train is seen and heard approaching nearby. As the police prepare to arrest Henry, he re-dials the phone, which the killer answers: "Sorry, wrong number."

== Cast ==
- Barbara Stanwyck as Leona Cotterell Stevenson
- Burt Lancaster as Henry J. Stevenson
- Ann Richards as Sally Hunt Lord
- Wendell Corey as Dr. Philip Alexander
- Harold Vermilyea as Waldo Evans
- Ed Begley as James Cotterell
- Leif Erickson as Fred Lord
- William Conrad as Morano
- John Bromfield as Joe - Detective
- Jimmy Hunt as Peter Lord
- Dorothy Neumann as Elizabeth Jennings
- Paul Fierro as Harpootlian
- Holmes Herbert as Wilkins Mineral (uncredited)

== Production ==
Sorry, Wrong Number conforms to many of the conventions of film noir. The film plays in real time with many flashbacks, and adds more characters and backstories. The bedroom window overlooks the night skyline of Manhattan. The film is shot in very dark light, with looming shadows and a circling camera used to maintain a high level of suspense. Hollywood's Production Code Administration initially objected to elements of Fletcher's screenplay, including its depiction of drug trafficking, and the script was significantly revised to win approval.

== Reception ==
Bosley Crowther raved about the final reel of the film: “Anatol Litvak has whipped it up hotly toward the end”. He also praised Stanwyck's performance: “. . . her terror is titanic—and she has run up some telephone bill . . .” He found the flashbacks within flashbacks convoluted and tedious. Variety listed the film as one of the top grossers of the year, earning $2.85 million in the U.S. alone.

The film scores 86% on Rotten Tomatoes.

== Adaptations ==
- A one-hour radio adaptation of the film was broadcast January 9, 1950 on Lux Radio Theatre. Stanwyck and Lancaster recreated their screen roles.
- The radio version of Sorry, Wrong Number was made into a television play broadcast on station WCBW-TV (now WCBS-TV) in New York on January 30, 1946, starring Mildred Natwick.
- A second live teleplay was broadcast on November 4, 1954, as the fourth episode of the anthology series Climax!, starring Shelley Winters and adapted by Fletcher, with music provided by Fletcher's former husband Bernard Herrmann.
- A version was produced for Australian television in 1958 starring Georgie Sterling. Sterling had performed in the play on radio in 1948.
- A television play based on Fletcher's play was produced by Polish Television and broadcast in 1966 with the title Pomyłka, proszę się wyłączyć! (trans. Wrong number, please hung up!), starring Aleksandra Śląska.
- The concept of the film was used as the basis for the Murder, She Wrote 1987 episode "Crossed Up".
- A television film aired in 1989 (as an original production for the USA Network), starring Loni Anderson, Patrick Macnee and Hal Holbrook. It was directed by Tony Wharmby and adapted by Ann Louise Bardach.

== Parody ==
On October 17, 1948, Stanwyck did a parody of Sorry, Wrong Number on The Jack Benny Program.

== Other media ==
Clips from Sorry, Wrong Number were used for the 1982 comedy-mystery Dead Men Don't Wear Plaid, the 1991 thriller Dead Again and the 2014 action-thriller Jack Ryan: Shadow Recruit.

== See also ==
- List of films featuring home invasions
- Locke, 2013 British film in which all characters besides protagonist are heard over the phone and not shown.
