= Luxvideo =

Luxvideo is an audiovisual production company, based in Andalusia, Spain. Founded by José Olivo in 2009, producing Music Videos, Television Adverts, Radio Adverts, Fitness training videos, Event videography, Animations, Short films, and Wedding videography.

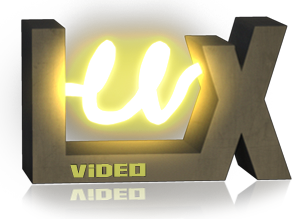
Current LuxVideo logo Luxvideo.

Luxvideo has recently worked with artists such as; Kim Dotcom, Ivonne Reyes, Eiko Takahashi, UPA Andalucía, Hombres Solos, Carpe Diem, Jayme Gutierrez.

As of 2015 Luxvideo has been working on a long-term collaboration with Monkey Media, rapidly growing a YouTube presence for the brands Destination Tips, Fame Focus, and Brilliant News.
