= Tom Sloan (television executive) =

British television executive (1919–1970)

Tom Sloan OBE

BBC Head of Light Entertainment
- In office November 1961 – May 1970
- Preceded by: Eric Maschwitz
- Succeeded by: Bill Cotton

Personal details
- Born: Thomas James Harman Sloan; 14 October 1919 Hertfordshire, England
- Died: 13 May 1970 (aged 50) London, England

Thomas James Harman Sloan OBE (14 October 1919 – 13 May 1970) was a British television executive. He was the BBC's Head of Light Entertainment in the 1960s.

== Early life ==
Sloan was born in Hertfordshire, England, the son of a Scottish Free Church Minister, and educated at Dulwich College. He entered the BBC Sound Effects Department in 1939, but left at the start of World War II to serve in the Royal Artillery throughout the war. He married Patricia Coverdale in 1943 and had four children.

== Broadcasting career ==
In 1946 he returned to BBC radio as a talks producer and spent several years as the BBC's representative in Canada. In 1956 he joined the BBC Light Entertainment group, under Ronnie Waldman. During this period, he provided the British commentary for the Eurovision Song Contests in 1957, 1958 and later the 1964 on radio (BBC Light Programme), and in 1959 and 1961 on BBC Television. He was also the executive producer of the 1968 contest.

In 1961 he was appointed Head of Light Entertainment, taking over from Eric Maschwitz (who became Assistant Controller of Programmes). One of his first tasks was to attempt to hold on to one of the BBC's biggest stars of the time, Tony Hancock. After he failed to persuade Hancock to sign a golden handcuffs deal designed to prevent him defecting to ITV or the cinema, he wrote a confidential memo to the BBC Controller of Programmes on 13 April 1962, stating "Hancock is a moody perfectionist with a great interest in money and no sense of loyalty to the corporation". He added that nothing short of handing over entire "production control" to Hancock and paying him an unprecedented £150,000 – the equivalent of £2m today – for a further 13 episodes of his TV sitcom would be enough to persuade him to stay with the BBC. In the autumn of 1961 he approached Hancock's writers, Ray Galton and Alan Simpson, with the idea of a series called Comedy Playhouse. He had ten half-hour slots and asked them to fill them with anything they wanted, insisting only that his title of Comedy Playhouse be used. The fourth episode of the series, broadcast on 5 January 1962, was entitled The Offer and starred Harry H. Corbett and Wilfrid Brambell as Harold and Albert Steptoe. Sloan badgered Galton and Simpson to write a series of Steptoe and Son episodes, which were broadcast between May and June 1962. A further seven series, totalling 57 episodes, would eventually be made between 1962 and 1974.

In his post as Head of Light Entertainment, Sloan provided viewers with a tougher and socially more critical view of comedy than was available before. The polite, middle-class humour which had previously limited the BBC's vision of what television amusement should offer, was supplemented with the social realism of comedies such as Steptoe and Son and Till Death Us Do Part. Sloan once said, "Comedy ought to reflect life. It is at its best when it does this. I've no intention of giving viewers a marzipan view of life". It was later said that Sloan attempted to invert the BBC's founding principles of "education, information and entertainment", giving priority to entertainment, followed by information and education. This was considered acceptable because entertainment, to him, meant not only what was cheerfully relaxing but also what was vigorous, thoughtful, stimulating and downright disturbing. He found the writers and the stars to provide and embody what he wanted, and created a space and audience for them.

Sloan held the post of Head of Light Entertainment for nine years. In this time he saw the BBC's output of light entertainment programmes dramatically increase. In 1955 BBC Light Entertainment had just six producers and turned out five programmes a week. By 1969, Sloan had thirty-four producers under him, responsible for sixteen programmes a week on two channels. In a lecture given in December 1969, he said "If I drop dead tomorrow, I would not mind being remembered for having some responsibility at least for The Black and White Minstrel Show, Hancock, Steptoe and Son, Till Death Us Do Part, Harry Worth, Not in Front of the Children, Dad's Army, Val Doonican and Rolf Harris shows, and Dixon of Dock Green". During his nine years as Head of Light Entertainment his production group carried off every major professional award in show business, including seven awards at the Montreux International Festival. He was created an Officer of the Order of the British Empire (OBE) in the 1969 New Year Honours list. His last project was the Royal Television Gala, recorded on the day of his death.

== Death ==
Sloan died of a heart attack on 13 May 1970, while still in his post as Head of Light Entertainment. David Attenborough, then the BBC's director of programmes, paid a tribute to him on television. He was succeeded by Bill Cotton. A memorial service was held in St Martin-in-the-Fields in the City of Westminster, London on Tuesday 23 June 1970. Harry Secombe read the lesson and Huw Wheldon (managing director of BBC Television) gave the address.
