= Miss Mabel =

1948 play

- Original language: English
- Written by: R. C. Sherriff
- Genre: Drama
- Setting: Small town in England

Premiere
- Date: 27 September 1948
- Place: Theatre Royal, Brighton

Miss Mabel is a 1948 stage play by R. C. Sherriff. It has been adapted for television at least five times. The original production premiered at the Theatre Royal, Brighton before transferring to London's West End where it ran for 180 performances between 23 November 1948 and 30 April 1949, initially at the Duchess Theatre before switching to the Strand Theatre. The West End cast included Richard Warner, Clive Morton and Mary Jerrold.

== Adaptations ==
=== 1950 version ===
A live version aired as part of British anthology series BBC Sunday Night Theatre in 1950. Cast included Mary Jerrold, Clive Morton, Richard Warner, W. E. Holloway, Josephine Middleton, Herbert C. Walton, Anne West, Ronald Marriott, Rowland Winterton and Anthony Farmer. It was performed on 26 March 1950 with a repeat performance on 29 March 1950. Both performances are lost, as the live broadcasts were not recorded.

=== 1953 version ===
A live version aired in 1953 as part of American anthology series Kraft Television Theatre on NBC. Cast included Lloyd Bochner, Malcolm Keen, Estelle Winwood and Frederick Worlock.

=== 1956 version ===
A version aired in 1956 as part of American anthology series Lux Video Theatre on CBS. Cast included Irene Anders, Anthony Eustrel, Ruth Hammond, Terrence Kilburn, Elsa Lanchester, J. Pat O'Malley, Richard Peel, Roland Winters and Frederick Worlock.

== 1958 Australian TV version ==
Miss Mabel
- Genre: comedy
- Based on: play by R.C. Sheriff
- Country of origin: Australia
- Original language: English

Production
- Running time: 65 mins
- Production company: ABC

Original release
- Network: ABC
- Release: 23 April 1958 (Sydney)
- Release: 14 May 1958 (Melbourne)

A version aired in 1958 on Australian television directed by Paul O'Loughlin. It broadcast live from Sydney on 23 April 1958 and was the television debut of Minnie Love, who was a noted stage entertainer.

Originally broadcast live in Sydney, kinescope ("telerecording") was made of the broadcast and later shown in Melbourne on 14 May. It went for 65 minutes. It is not known if the kinescope recording still exists.

=== Premise ===
An old lady has an unpleasant twin who recently died.

=== Cast ===
- Minnie Love as Miss Mabel
- Walter Pym as the lawyer
- Charles Tasman as the vicar
- Ida Newton as Miss Wilson
- Geoffrey King as the doctor
- John Bluthal as the Gardener
- Lewis Fiander as Peter
- Derani Scarr as Mary
- Peter Owen as the Inspector.

=== Production ===
Love said she was enthusiastic about live television because it was so close to theatre.

=== Reception ===
The Age said Love gave "an outstanding performance" which "inspired the cast".

== 1980 version ==
A version aired in 1980 as part of French television series Au théâtre ce soir. Cast included Jandeline, Annick Alane, Vannick Le Poulain, Brigitte Winstel, Jean-Pierre Delage, Jacques Dynam, Robert Le Béal, Jean Barney, Bernard Lanneau, Edward Sanderson, and Bernard Durand.

== Bibliography ==
- Wearing, J.P. The London Stage 1940-1949: A Calendar of Productions, Performers, and Personnel. Rowman & Littlefield, 2014.

== See also ==
- Black Limelight - Stage play which also saw multiple television adaptations
- One Bright Day
- List of live television plays broadcast on Australian Broadcasting Corporation (1950s)
