= Wynne Ajello =

English singer

- Born: Winifred Alice Cutter Gellard; 9 January 1903; Fulham, London, England
- Died: 18 April 1992 (aged 89); Worthing, Sussex, England
- Occupation: Singer
- Years active: 1920s–1940s

Wynne Ajello (born Winifred Alice Cutter Gellard; 9 January 1903 – 18 April 1992) was an English soprano singer who made many broadcasts on BBC radio between the 1920s and 1940s.

She was born in Fulham, London, the daughter of a piano teacher who later married into the Ajello family, originally of Italian origin. She developed a talent for singing, and won a children's singing competition. She made her first BBC broadcasts in 1925, singing a selection of coloratura arias, but diversified into also performing songs from musical revues.

Ajello made recordings for the Durium label. In 1933, she made her first television broadcasts, singing as part of the White Coons concert party, directed by Harry S. Pepper, but then took a lengthy break after a nervous breakdown.

By 1936, it was reported that she had made over 550 broadcasts for the BBC. In 1938, she took the role of Snow White in the radio adaptation of the Disney cartoon feature. She continued to feature in BBC broadcasts through the Second World War, into the late 1940s.

She married her stepbrother, Reginald Ajello, in 1929. She died in Worthing, Sussex, in 1992, aged 89.
