= Madi Hedd =

Australian actress

- Occupation: Actor
- Notable work: Ending It; Lady in Danger
- Spouse: Bruce Beeby

Madi Hedd was an Australian actress. She appeared in a number of plays, television shows, and films in Britain and Australia. From 1951 to 1957, she worked in Britain, appearing in a number of stage shows. She also appeared in Australian television dramas.

In 1969, she appeared alongside Noel Johnson in the BBC Radio 2 drama serial Find The Lady by David Ellis.

She was married to actor Bruce Beeby, who she met in 1946 and acted with in Sons of the Morning.

== Select filmography ==
- Ending It (1957) - TV
- Lady in Danger (1959) - TV
