= Michael Deacon (actor) =

Scottish actor (1933–2000)

Michael Deacon (6 March 1937 – 26 December 2000) was a Scottish actor.

== Life and career ==
His many stage appearances included roles for venues such as the Hampstead Theatre, Mercury Theatre, Colchester, Pentameters Theatre and the Finborough Theatre. In 1995, he played the title role in Who is Eddie Linden at The Old Red Lion in Islington. The play was adapted by William Tanner from Sebastian Barker's biography of poet and literary magazine editor Eddie Linden.

Deacon was also a highly distinguished radio actor, particularly for the BBC. His BBC Radio work ranged from productions of major classics and important new works to the long-running soap opera The Archers, in which he played the Vicar of Ambridge, Jerry Buckle. He also provided the voice of Gríma Wormtongue in the animated film The Lord of the Rings (1978) and can be heard in many roles in commercially available audio productions of Shakespeare plays. He also played many television roles and was in the film A Kind of Loving (1962), directed by John Schlesinger, playing Les.

Deacon was born on 6 March 1937. Deacon died of lung cancer in Northwood, Middlesex, England, on 26 December 2000.
