= Helmut Bakaitis =

Australian director, actor and screenwriter

- Born: Lauban, Lower Silesia, Prussia, Germany
- Occupations: Director, actor, screenwriter
- Years active: 1959-present

Helmut Bakaitis (born 26 September 1944) is a German-born Australian director, actor and screenwriter and playwright. He is best known for his role in The Matrix Reloaded and The Matrix Revolutions as the character the Architect.

== Early life ==
Bakaitis was born in Dresden or Lauban, Lower Silesia, Germany (now Lubań, Poland), to Lithuanian parents, Vincas and Eugenia Bakaitis, who were fleeing Lithuania at the time. He spent his first five years in UN transit camps in Germany and Austria, while his father worked as a translator.

Bakaitis arrived in Australia with his family in 1950 at the age of six. They initially lived in immigration centres. His father, an academic, hoped to become a teacher or lecturer, but was forced to dig sewers to support the family. Bakaitis was educated at Fort Street High School, Sydney, where he had earned a scholarship. Bullied at school, he immersed himself in books, language, film and the performing arts. He formed a drama group and performed in and directed school productions, and eventually began to write plays. He left home at 16, and worked as a stenographer while still studying.

Bakaitis won a scholarship to the National Institute for Dramatic Art (NIDA). While there, he formed his own theatre company together with a group of fellow students, including Jim Sharman. NIDA supported the student initiative and toured one of the productions. Before Bakaitis had graduated (in 1965), he was offered his first professional acting role at the Theatre Royal in Hobart.

== Career ==
Bakaitis spent seven years with the Melbourne Theatre Company as an actor and head of the youth workshops, followed by stints with the Old Tote Theatre, the Sydney Theatre Company. and as co-director of Adelaide's Come Out Youth Festival. He subsequently studied a post-graduate diploma in Drama and Education at Northumbria University in Newcastle upon Tyne, England, and established youth programs in inner London.

On his return to Melbourne, he became founding artistic director of St Martins Youth Arts Centre, Melbourne, where he worked for 5 years, then the Director of the New Moon Company in Cairns for 3 years. Back in Sydney he became Director of Penrith's Q Theatre for 7 years, followed by Head of Directing at NIDA for nine years until 2007. He then started teaching directing at Australian Academy of Dramatic Art (AADA), now the Australian Institute of Music – Dramatic Arts (AIMDA).

== Filmography ==
=== Film ===
Year	Title	Role	Type
1971	Stork	Clyde	Feature film
1972	Shirley Thompson vs. the Aliens	Harold	Feature film
1985	I Can't Get Started	Sidney	TV film
2000	Drama School	Himself	
2001	The Farm	Judge Wescott	
2003	The Matrix Reloaded	The Architect	Feature film
2003	The Matrix Revolutions	The Architect	Feature film
2003	Syntax Error	Doctor	Short film
2005	The Illustrated Family Doctor	John	Feature film
2006	Happy Feet	Live Action Cast	Feature film
2009	Lucky Country	Connolly	Feature film
2015	Truth	Dick Thornburgh	Feature film
2015	Crushed	Sgt O'Reilly	
2016	Hacksaw Ridge	Minister	Feature film
2018	Jack Irish	Thornton Finch	TV film

=== Television ===
Year	Title	Role	Type
1967–70	Homicide	Larry Fenton / Tommy Fraser / Don Lambton	TV series, 3 episodes "Taken Care Of", "Dead Shot", "The Living Death"
1987	Melba	John Lemonne	TV miniseries
1988	Home and Away	George Morris	TV series
1996	Police Rescue	Dr. Mayfield	TV series, episode: "Nobby's Place"
1997–99	Home and Away	Peter Fraser	TV series
1998	A Difficult Woman	Chancellor #2	TV miniseries
2003	All Saints	Salvator Forlano	TV series, 3 episodes: "To Forgive, Divine", "Wrong Call", "Older and Wiser"
2005	The Surgeon	Dr. Gearhardt	TV series
2009	Satisfaction	Marty Volkering	TV series
2012	Howzat! Kerry Packer's War	Bob Parish	TV miniseries
2016	Rake	Judge Barton	TV series

=== As screenwriter ===
Year	Title	Role	Type
1972	Shirley Thompson vs. the Aliens	Screenwriter	Feature film

== Theatre ==
=== As actor ===
Year	Title	Role	Type
1959	Hamlet	Hamlet	Fort Street High School, Sydney
1964	Extracts from Shakespeare	Egeus in A Midsummer Night's Dream / Orlando in As You Like It	UNSW
1964	The Caucasian Chalk Circle		UNSW Old Tote Theatre
1964	Our Town	George Gibbs	UNSW Old Tote Theatre
1964	Two Programs of One Act Plays	James in The Mask / Colin Arnott in Try it Again	UNSW Old Tote Theatre
1964	Two Programs of Short Plays	Jeremy in The Zoo Story / Man at the bar in Marty / Revolutionary in The Chinese Wall	UNSW Old Tote Theatre
1965	On the Nature of Lo, Etc.''	Chorus member	UNSW
1965	A Series of Dance Pieces	Dancer in Ballad of the Drover's Wife	UNSW
1965–66	Othello		UNSW Old Tote Theatre, Tasmania, South Australia with Young Elizabethan Players
1965	Down in the Valley	Thomas Bouche	UNSW Old Tote Theatre
1965	The Plough and the Stars	Jack Clitheroe	UNSW Old Tote Theatre
1965	A Taste of Honey		Cell Block Theatre, Darlinghurst
1966	Twelfth Night		Tasmania, South Australia with Young Elizabethan Players
1966	Romeo and Juliet	Paris	South Australia with Young Elizabethan Players
1966	Julius Caesar		South Australia with Young Elizabethan Players
1966	Richard II		South Australia with Young Elizabethan Players
1966	A Refined Look at Existence		Jane Street Theatre
1966	Halloran's Little Boat		Jane Street Theatre
1967	Incident at Vichy		Russell Street Theatre
1967	Where's Daddy?	Tom	St Martins Theatre, Melbourne
1967	The Importance of Being Earnest	Lane (Manservant)	St Martins Theatre, Melbourne
1967	Moby Dick – Rehearsed		Russell Street Theatre
1967	The Flower Children		A Little Bourke Street Discotheque
1967	Death of a Salesman		Russell Street Theatre
1967	A Flea in Her Ear		Russell Street Theatre
1968	The Crucible		Russell Street Theatre, Canberra Theatre, Tasmania
1968	The Magistrate		Russell Street Theatre, Canberra Theatre, Mildura Arts Centre, Broken Hill, The King's Theatre Mt Gambier, Adelaide Teachers College Theatre
1968	Burke's Company	Wills	Russell Street Theatre
1968	The Man in the Glass Booth		Russell Street Theatre
1968	Three Sisters		Russell Street Theatre
1968	Major Barbara		Russell Street Theatre
1969	Henry IV, Part 1	Edmund Mortimer	Octagon Theatre, Perth, Keith Murdoch Court, Melbourne
1969	The Country Wife		Russell Street Theatre, Canberra Theatre
1969	Loot		Russell Street Theatre
1969	The Soldiers		Russell Street Theatre, Canberra Theatre
1969	A Long View		Russell Street Theatre
1969	Six Characters in Search of an Author		Russell Street Theatre
1969	The Unknown Soldier and His Wife		Russell Street Theatre
1969	Rookery Nook		Russell Street Theatre
1970	The First Mrs Fraser	Ninian Fraser	St Martins Theatre, Melbourne
1970	The Caucasian Chalk Circle	Shauva	Russell Street Theatre
1970	Day of Glory		Russell Street Theatre
1970	The Devils		Russell Street Theatre
1970	Son of Man		Russell Street Theatre
1970–71	All's Well That Ends Well		Princess Theatre Melbourne, Canberra Theatre, Octagon Theatre, Perth
1971	King Lear		Russell Street Theatre
1972	The Taming of the Shrew		UNSW Parade Theatre, Canberra Theatre
1972	Macbeth		UNSW Parade Theatre
1973	Crete and Sergeant Pepper		Union Hall, Adelaide
1973	Measure for Measure		Union Hall, Adelaide
1973	Occupations		Arts Theatre, Adelaide
1973	Hans Kohlhaas		Union Hall, Adelaide
1987	The Department	Hans	Seymour Centre with Australian Elizabethan Theatre Trust / Sydney Theatre Company
1989	Top Silk	Paul Bradley	Seymour Centre, Melbourne Athenaeum, Canberra Theatre, Playhouse Adelaide with Melbourne Theatre Company
1994	Dead City		Belvoir Street Theatre
1995	King Lear		Wharf Theatre, Q Theatre, Penrith, Orange Civic Theatre
1996	Pentecost		Wharf Theatre
1996	Macbeth		Wharf Theatre
1997	Pygmalion		Glen Street Theatre
1999	Glory	Cameo	NIDA Theatre
2001	My Head Was a Sledgehammer	The Professor	Belvoir Street Theatre
2003	Sydney Symphony Superdome Spectacular		Sydney Olympic Park
2006	The Illusion		Darlinghurst Theatre
2006	No Names ... No Pack Drill	Detective Browning	Parade Theatre
2006	Now That Communism Is Dead My Life Feels Empty	Voiceover artist	Tower Theatre, Melbourne
2011	Titus Andronicus		Wharf Theatre
2013	Liberty Equality Fraternity	Walter Silverstein	Ensemble Theatre
2020	Liberty, Equality, Fraternity	Walter Silverstein	Online – Australia: NSW

=== As writer / director ===
Year	Title	Role	Company / venues
1966, 1968	Pageant of Love Tree	Playwright	Russell Street Theatre, Victorian Country Tour
1968	The Titillators	Director / playwright	La Mama Theatre
1969	The Little Lady Steps Out	Playwright	La Mama Theatre
1970	Mutants	Playwright	Sydney
1971–72, 1975	The Incredible Mind-Blowing Trial of Jack Smith	Playwright	Melbourne, Presbyterian Ladies' College, Melbourne, Traralgon, Playhouse Adelaide, Walter Burley Griffin Incinerator, Ipswich
1972	Shadows of Blood	Playwright	Nimrod Street Theatre
1974	The One Show	Devisor / director	Carclew Stables, Adelaide
1975	The Lay of Sir Orfeo	Devisor / director	Space Theatre, Adelaide
1975–76	Carlota and Maximilian	Director / playwright	Melbourne, Space Theatre Adelaide
1976	Le Chateau d'Hydro-Therapie Magnetique	Playwright	Jane Street Theatre
1979	The Sensational South Yarra Show	Playwright / director	St Martins Youth Arts Centre
1980	The Two Fiddlers	Director	Scott Theatre, Adelaide
1980	Cain's Hand	Director	Scott Theatre, Adelaide, St Martins Youth Arts Centre, Nimrod Upstairs
1981	A Sign in Space	Playwright	Theatre 62, Adelaide
1981	When Lips Collide	Director / lyricist	Playbox Theatre, Melbourne
1982	Sweaty Weather	Director	St Martins Youth Arts Centre
1983	The Incredible Mind-Blowing Trial of Jack Smith	Writer	St Michael's College, Adelaide
1983	Spring Awakening	Director	St Martins Youth Arts Centre
1983	La Dispute	Adaptor	St Martins Theatre
1983	Snuff Bingo	Director	St Martins Theatre
1984	Beach Blanket Tempest	Director	Townsville, Cairns Civic Theatre, Theatre Royal Mackay, Rockhampton, Mt Isa, Araluen Arts Centre, Playhouse Adelaide, Canberra Theatre, University of Sydney with New Moon Company
1984	Gentlemen Prefer Blondes	Director	North Queensland tour with New Moon Company
1984	Key Largo	Director	North Queensland tour with New Moon Company
1985	Guys and Dolls	Director	North Queensland tour with New Moon Company
1985	On Our Selection	Director	North Queensland tour with New Moon Company
1985	Trumpets and Raspberries	Director	North Queensland tour with New Moon Company
1997	Mistletoe Magic	Director / playwright	Sydney Opera House
1988	A Different Drummer	Director	Suncorp Theatre, Brisbane
1990	Operation Holy Mountain	Director	Q Theatre, Penrith
1990	The Government Investigator	Director	Q Theatre, Penrith
1990	Rome Tremble – Crumbs from a Feast of Callas	Director	Wharf Theatre
1990	Beach Blanket Tempest	Director	Q Theatre, Penrith
1991	The Christian Brothers	Director	Ensemble Theatre, Q Theatre Penrith, University of Newcastle
1991	The Caretaker	Director	Q Theatre, Penrith
1991	The Killing of Sister George	Director	Q Theatre, Penrith
1991	Kenny's Coming Home	Director	Q Theatre, Penrith
1992	Better Known as Bee	Director	Q Theatre, Penrith
1992	Lipstick Dreams	Director	Q Theatre, Penrith
1993	Daylight Saving	Director	Q Theatre, Penrith
1993	Wet and Dry	Director	Q Theatre, Penrith
1993	Lumps	Director	Q Theatre, Penrith
1994	A Winning Day	Director	Q Theatre, Penrith
1995	Chair in a Landscape	Director	Q Theatre, Penrith
1996	Working: A Musical	Director	Glen Street Theatre
1998	The Curse of the House of Atreus	Director	NIDA Theatre
1999	Le Legs et La Dispute	Director	NIDA Theatre
1999	The Telephone / Wolfboy / The Post Office / The White Room	Producer	NIDA Theatre
1999	Meadowlark, Excerpts from The Baker's Wife / Dracula / Action	Producer	NIDA Theatre
1999	Glory	Director	NIDA Theatre
2000	The Ugly Man	Director	NIDA Theatre
2000	Variety, Vaudeville & Basic Burlesque	Director (Australian Vaudeville)	NIDA Theatre
2001	Titus Andronicus	Director	NIDA Theatre
2001	Goodnight Children Everywhere	Director	NIDA Theatre
2003	Antigone	Director	Parade Theatre
2005	Too Young for Ghosts	Director	NIDA
