= Jimmy Sharman =

Australian boxer

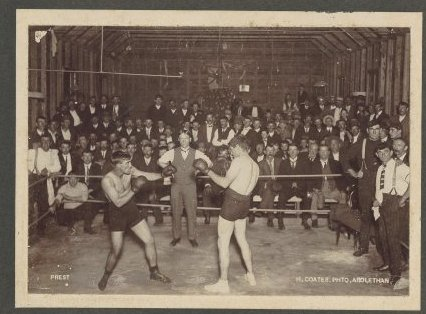
- Jimmy Sharman Sr refereeing a boxing match between Prest and Lewis in the 1910s
- Born: 20 June 1887; Narellan, New South Wales, Australian
- Died: 18 November 1965 (aged 78); Camden, New South Wales, Australia
- Occupations: Boxing troupe founder; entertainment impresario
- Relatives: Jim Sharman (grandson)

James Sharman (20 June 1887 – 18 November 1965) was an Australian boxing troupe and entertainment impresario. His son also worked with him and took over for his father in 1955 after playing as a professional rugby league footballer.

== Biography ==
Sharman was born in Narellan, New South Wales to James Sharman and Caroline Brailsfield, the fifth of thirteen children. Sharman established an itinerant boxing tent in 1911 at Ardlethan near Temora. The tent regularly visited 45-50 country shows annually. His son, Jimmy Sharman Jr, took over the business in 1955. The tent formed part of the Australian Show landscape until 1971, when new regulations barred boxers fighting more than once a week. A member of the "Showmans Guild of Australasia", Sharman Jr then turned to dodgem cars in partnership with Garry O'Neill and Reg Grundy.

== Jimmy Sharman Jr. ==
Jimmy Sharman Jr.
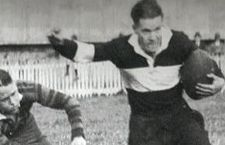
- Jimmy Sharman playing for Wests

Personal information
- Born: James Michael Sharman; 28 October 1912 Narrandera, New South Wales, Australia
- Died: 24 April 2006 (aged 93)

Playing information
- Position: Fullback
Club
Years	Team	Pld	T	G	FG	P
1934–39	Western Suburbs	59	4	19	0	50
- Occupations: Rugby League footballer; Football coach; Journalist; Entertainment impresario

Sharman junior was born, as James Michael Sharman in 1912 at Narrandera, New South Wales. He attended his first Sydney Royal Easter Show in 1926 working in his father's tent. Sharman junior played rugby league for Western Suburbs Magpies. He was fullback in Western Suburbs' 1934 premiership win against the Eastern Suburbs. In 1938 he became First Grade captain. He retired after 7 seasons in 1939 to become a journalist, taking over the boxing tent from his father in 1955. Sharman played 45 games between 1935 and 1939, scored 12 tries and kicked 11 goals. He died on 26 April 2006, aged 94. He was awarded life membership in 1998.

== Jimmy Sharman's Boxing Tent ==
Many famous boxers worked in the Sharman tent, including:

- Ronald O'Callaghan

The Black Irish Man (champion) Aboriginal

- Frank Burns (middleweight champion)
- Graham Burns, Jeff Burns, Ted Burns, Charlie Burns
- Teddy Green (bantamweight)
- Harry Mack (featherweight)
- Mickey Miller (bantam and featherweight)
- George Cook (heavyweight)
- Jack Hassen (lightweight)
- Billy Grime (triple titleholder)
- Jackie Green (triple titleholder)
- Dave Sands Aboriginal boxer
- Greg McNamara (light-heavyweight)

Famous Indigenous Australians to work in the tent include:

- George Bracken, Aboriginal lawyer
- Geoff Clark, former ATSIC chairperson
- Douglas Nicholls, later Pastor with the Churches of Christ in Australia and then Governor of South Australia
- Max Stuart, convicted murderer and Arrente elder

Some boxers came from the Cherbourg Aboriginal mission, near Nanango, Queensland.

== Legacy ==
In 2003 the Royal Agricultural Society of New South Wales honoured Sharman Jr. with the title of "Show Legend".

== In popular culture ==
- The Australian rock band Midnight Oil's 1984 album Red Sails in the Sunset includes the song "Jimmy Sharman's Boxers" whose lyrics assert that Sharman exploited the Aboriginal boxers he employed in his show.
- The Australian rock band Cold Chisel's song "Yesterdays" has lyrics which refer to Jimmy Sharman's boxers .
- The 2007 Peter Carstairs film September features its main characters - 15-year-old boys Ed and Paddy - setting up a boxing ring on Ed's family's wheatbelt property in anticipation of a visit by Sharman's boxing troupe. Paddy later joins the troupe.
- Jimmy Sharman Jr's son Jim Sharman became a theatre and film director known especially for the musicals Hair, Jesus Christ Superstar, The Rocky Horror Show, and the movie version, The Rocky Horror Picture Show.
- One Paul Kelly track, "Rally Around the Drum", written with Archie Roach, was about an Indigenous tent boxing man.
- Colleen McCullough's novel, The Thorn Birds, features a character joining Jimmy Sharman's troupe.

Stephen McGraths historical fiction novel Jimmy Sharmans Boxers published 1 September 2023 describes Sharman’s touring during World War One when Sharman who was 27 and fit did not enlist and continued to tour his troupe throughout the war.
