= Brian Phelan =

Irish actor, dramatist and screenwriter (1934–2024)

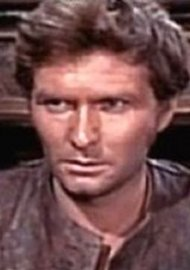
- Phelan as Grimshaw on H.M.S. Defiant, 1962
- Born: 2 December 1934; Dublin, Ireland
- Died: 8 May 2024 (aged 89); England
- Occupations: Actor, dramatist, screenwriter
- Years active: 1956–2002
- Spouse: Jan Heppell (m. 1960; div. 1964)
- Partner: Dorothy Bromiley (1963–2024; her death)
- Awards: CableACE Award (1987)
- Website: brianphelan.org.uk

Brian Phelan (2 December 1934 – 8 May 2024) was an Irish actor, playwright, and screenwriter. His film work included The Criminal (1960), The Kitchen (1961) and The Soldier's Tale (1964), while his screenwriting included The Knockback (two parts, 1985), and The Treaty (1991).

== Early life ==
Phelan was born in Dublin, Ireland, on 2 December 1934 to Micheál Phelan, a builder, and Theresa (née Fogerty) Phelan, a housewife. Educated by the Christian Brothers, Brian was apprenticed as a carpenter at the age of 15. Three years later, he and his family moved to Canada. While there, he was able to obtain his first professional job at the Crest Theatre in Toronto as an assistant stage carpenter.

== Career ==
In 1956, Phelan returned to Dublin to pursue his acting career. He appeared in productions at the Abbey Theatre, the Gate Theatre with the Edwards McLiammoir Company, and the Pike Theatre in the 1950s.

Phelan's notable film appearances include The Kitchen (1961), HMS Defiant (1962) and the title role in The Soldier's Tale (1964). He also appeared in three Joseph Losey films, The Criminal (1960), The Servant (1963) and Accident (1967).

While he continued to work as a full-time actor in the 1960s, Phelan began his screenwriting career. His first television play was The Tormentors (1966), starring James Mason and Stanley Baker, produced by ATV. Writing predominantly for television, Phelan’s other works include The Russian Soldier (BBC, 1986), The Emigrants (BBC, 1977), In the Secret State (BBC, 1985), The Ivory Trade (HBO), and No Tears (RTÉ One, 2002). Phelan wrote for films as well, including Little Mother (also known as Woman of the Year, 1973), Honeybaby, Honeybaby (1974), and Tailspin: Behind the Korean Airliner Tragedy (1989).

His stage plays include The Signalman's Apprentice (1971), which has been produced worldwide, Article Five, Paddy, News, and Soft Shoe Shuffle. In 1961, Phelan co-presented with Robin Fox the first production of Tom Murphy’s A Whistle in the Dark at the Theatre Royal Stratford East and the Apollo Theatre.

Phelan received awards including the CableACE Award for the Writer of a Dramatic Special for Knockback in 1987 and the Sapporo Prize at the Tokyo International Film Festival for The Russian Soldier. Murphy’s Stroke, a film written by Phelan, won a Jacob’s Award in 1980. He was also awarded the London Irish Post Award for his work on The Treaty (1992), and a Golden Nymph Award for Best Mini Series for No Tears (2002) at the 42nd Monte Carlo Television Festival.

His papers were acquired by Special Collections at the University of Delaware.

== Personal life ==
Phelan met actress Dorothy Bromiley on the set of The Criminal, where she was accompanying her then-husband, Joseph Losey. Bromiley later divorced Losey, and she and Phelan entered a long-term relationship beginning in 1963.

=== Death ===
Phelan died in England on 8 May 2024, five days after Bromiley. He was 89 years old.
