= Black Limelight =

1936 play by Gordon Sherry and 1938 film by Paul L. Stein

Black Limelight is a 1936 play by Gordon Sherry that in 1938 became a British crime film directed by Paul L. Stein and starring Joan Marion and Raymond Massey.

== Plot ==
"It concerns itself with the murder of a vulgar young woman [Lily]. Suspicion rests on refined young married Peter, who has disappeared, and is known to have spent week-ends with the young woman in question, apparently with the full knowledge of his charming wife [Mary]. She, on hearing of the murder, does everything in her power to screen her spouse. There are, of course, police and detectives on the track, but while they are seemingly very active, they rarely turn up at psychological moments. Peter therefore easily gains access to his home, despite the fact that no one could mistake him, in his unhappy condition, as other than one fleeing from justice. Did he commit the murder?"

== Production ==
Sherry's play was an early serial-killer drama ("the monster's homicidal mania leaps up at the time of the full moon," noted Time magazine) and was originally intended to be premiered in London. In the event it opened at Broadway's Mansfield Theatre on 9 November 1936, with a London production only appearing in mid-April the following year. A preview week at the small Q Theatre was immediately followed by a West End transfer to the St James' Theatre on the 22nd, the production running in all for 414 performances. The text used in London was somewhat revised; among other adjustments, the heroine's name was changed from Naomi to Mary.

Margaret Rawlings scored a huge success doubling two roles - protective wife Mary and, in an Act II flashback, murdered mistress Lily - which on Broadway had been played by separate actresses, Winifred Lenihan and Kate Warriner. The doubling arrangement was Sherry's preferred mode, in order to suggest "that Peter fell in love again with the very qualities which attracted him to his wife." Similarly, in the Daily Mirror Godfrey Winn welcomed "the most thrilling show I have seen for ages" and suggested that "Every woman should go to hear Margaret Rawlings' soliloquy on marriage."

== Adaptations ==
=== Television ===
Fifteen years later Rawlings and John Robinson repeated their stage roles of Mary and Peter Charrington in a BBC Sunday Night Theatre presentation transmitted on 1 June 1952. Another British TV production, an Armchair Theatre instalment screened on 30 September 1956, retained Robinson but cast Rosalie Crutchley as Mary. Renée Asherson and Nigel Stock played the leads in yet another TV version, shown in the BBC Sunday-Night Play strand on 14 January 1962. An Australian TV production, starring Bruce Beeby and Patricia Kennedy, was transmitted on 15 July 1959, and - like all three British versions - is presumed lost.

=== Film ===
The film version was made by the Associated British Picture Corporation at ABPC's Elstree facility, with Sherry's play adapted by screenwriters Dudley Leslie and Walter Summers. Directed by Paul L. Stein, the completed film was reviewed by Variety in June 1938 ("Script follows closely the stage version, except that the culprit is indicated too early") and by Britain's Monthly Film Bulletin in July. As well as calling Black Limelight "an interesting example of its type," the MFB critic pointed out that Joan Marion's performance "is so convincingly restrained that a film which begins as just another murder thriller almost ends up as a social document."

The budget was £20,510.

The film's UK general release followed on 9 January 1939 and its New York opening in June. "Although as a murder mystery Black Limelight betrays its hand rather pointedly early in the game," noted the New York Times, "it has a certain documentary interest as a study of what happens to people mixed up in a big murder case in England ... This being a British film, Scotland Yard is made out to be quite stupid, instead of omniscient, as in our politer productions." In Britain the film was reissued in 1942 as a second feature, while in the US it was later screened under the alternative title Footsteps in the Sand.

Visiting a cinema, Alexander B Cust is shown watching Black Limelight in the 1992 Poirot adventureThe A.B.C. Murders, which is set in 1936, despite the film not being made until 1938.

==== Cast ====
- Joan Marion - Mary Charrington
- Raymond Massey - Peter Charrington
- Elliott Mason - Jemima
- Walter Hudd - Lawrence Crawford
- Henry Oscar - Inspector Tanner
- Dan Tobin - Reporter Roberts
- Leslie Bradley - Bill, young detective-on-duty
- Diana Beaumont - Gwen, young maid-next-door
- Coral Browne - Lily James
