= Diane Franklin =

American actress (born 1962)

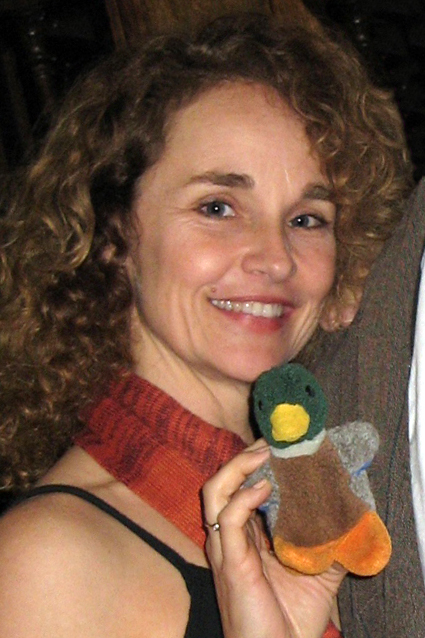
- Franklin in January 2009
- Born: February 11, 1962 (age 64); Plainview, New York, U.S.
- Education: California State University, Northridge
- Occupations: Actress; producer; model
- Years active: 1979–present
- Spouse: Ray DeLaurentis (m. 1989)
- Children: 2

Diane Franklin (born February 11, 1962) is an American actress, producer, and model.

== Early life ==
Franklin was born in Plainview, New York. Her parents were German and Austrian immigrants. Franklin is deaf in her left ear.

== Education ==
Franklin attended New York University for one year in 1981–1982 before dropping out to become a professional actress. She continued her education thirty years later when she attended Moorpark College and then California State University, Northridge where she graduated with a degree in education in 2017.

== Career ==
Early in her acting career, Franklin appeared in TV commercials for Coca-Cola, Trident, Jell-O, and Maxwell House coffee. At the age of 17, she appeared in two episodes of As the World Turns which aired in October 1979. Her breakthrough role was as Karen in the 1982 teen drama film The Last American Virgin. That same year, she played Patricia Montelli in the horror film Amityville II: The Possession. She was given top billing in her next film, the 1984 erotic comedy film Second Time Lucky, and played French exchange student Monique Junet in the 1985 comedy film Better Off Dead.

Franklin played Princess Joanna in the 1989 comedy film Bill & Ted's Excellent Adventure and has appeared as an extra or in guest roles in episodes of television series such as Bay City Blues, Matlock, and Family Law. She also appeared in three television films, including a role as Jock Ewing's first wife in the 1986 film Dallas: The Early Years.

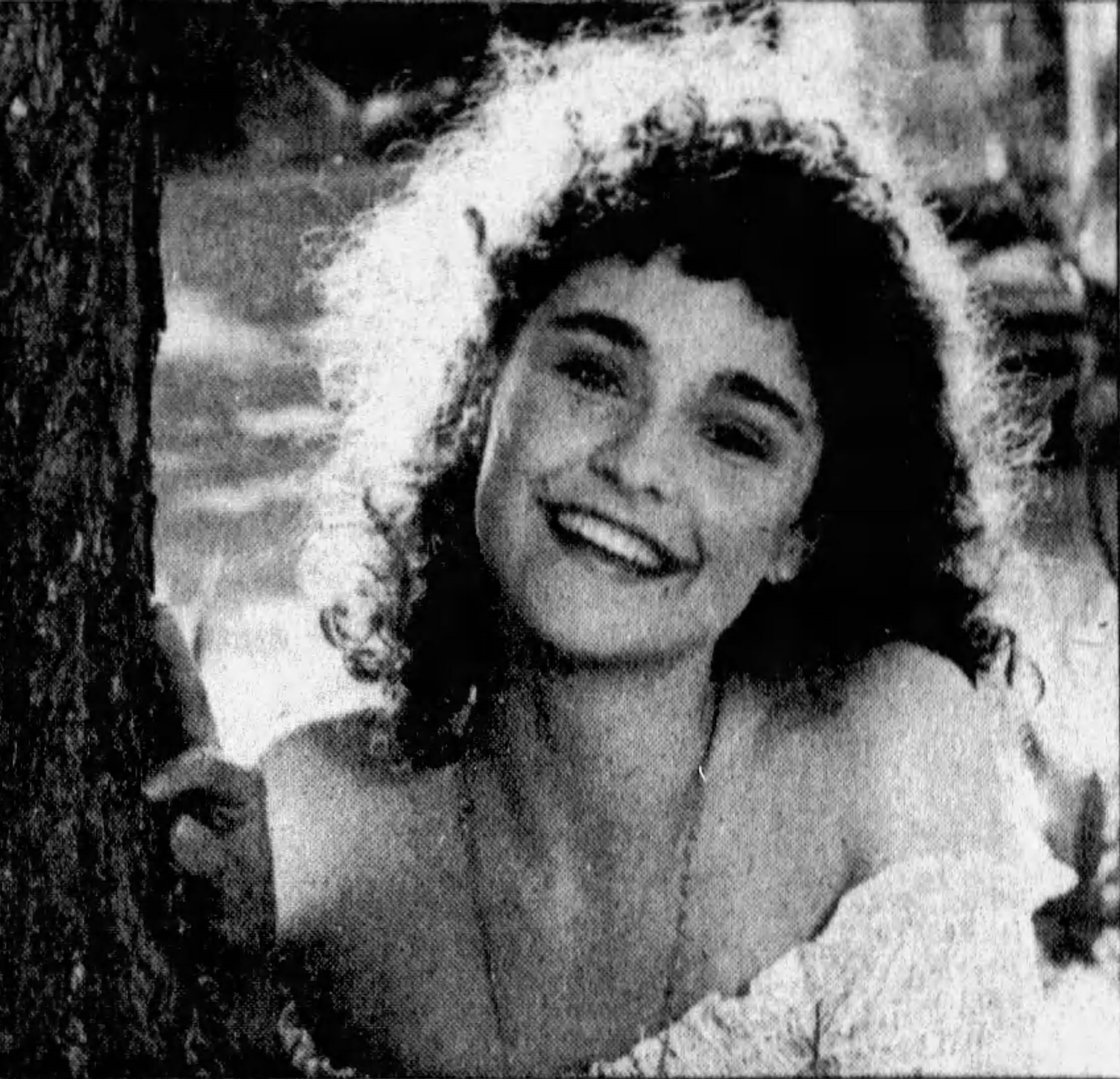
Franklin in Summer Girl (1983)

In 2012, Franklin published a memoir called Diane Franklin: The Excellent Adventures of the Last American, French Exchange Babe of the 80s. In 2017, she published a second memoir called Diane Franklin: The Excellent Curls of the Last American, French-Exchange Babe of the 80s. In 2018, she returned to the Amityville franchise to play Louise DeFeo in the horror-drama film The Amityville Murders In 2021, she played Mrs. Healy in the horror film Ted Bundy: American Boogeyman.

In 2023, Franklin played Danielle in Waking Nightmare, an independent horror film that was granted a SAG-AFTRA interim agreement, allowing filming to continue and the actors to promote the film. She also starred as Sinead Chambers in Pareidolia, a British horror short film.

== Personal life ==
Franklin married Ray DeLaurentis, an animation writer for shows such as The Fairly OddParents, in 1989. They reside in Westlake Village, California. Their son, Nicholas DeLaurentis is a musician, while their daughter, Olivia DeLaurentis is a comedian and actress best known as one half of the absurdist comedy double act Syd & Olivia.

== Filmography ==
=== Film ===
Year	Film	Role	Notes
1982	Amityville II: The Possession	Patricia Montelli	
1982	The Last American Virgin	Karen	
1984	Second Time Lucky	Eve	
1985	Better Off Dead	Monique Junet	
1986	TerrorVision	Suzy Putterman	
1989	How I Got into College	Sharon Browne	
1989	Bill & Ted's Excellent Adventure	Princess Joanna	
2006	Punchcard Player	Sweetheart	
2008	The Adventures of Lass	Mum / Gramma	Short film
2009	The Adventures of Lass 2: The Sweet Potato Rush	Mum / Gramma	Short film
2010	The Adventures of Lass 3: Going to America	Mum / Old Lass	Short film
2011	Humanized	Computer	Short film
2012	My Better Half	Viola Young	Short film
2013	Lovechild	Jenny Meyers	Short film
2013	Royal Effups	Earless of Incestia	Short film
2018	The Amityville Murders	Louise DeFeo	
2019	Wally Got Wasted	Emma	
2021	Ted Bundy: American Boogeyman	Mrs. Healy	
2021	Clay Zombies	D.J.St. VC Skatewell	
2023	Waking Nightmare	Danielle	
2023	Pareidolia	Sinead Chambers	Short film
2023	The Dark Room	Dr. Riley	

=== Television ===
Year	Title	Role	Notes
1983	Bay City Blues	background extra	2 episodes
1983	Summer Girl	Cinni	TV movie
1983	Deadly Lessons	Stefanie Aggiston	TV movie
1985	The Insiders	background extra	1 episode
1985	Finder Of Lost Loves	Emily Bennetts	1 episode
1986	Dallas: The Early Years	Amanda Lewis Ewing	TV movie
1987	Charles In Charge	Anna Grudov	1 episode
1987	Matlock	Nancy Lamont	1 episode
1988	Freddy's Nightmares	Jessica	1 episode
1989	Alfred Hitchcock Presents	Paula / Paulette	1 episode
1990	Encyclopedia Brown	Sondra Gafney	1 episode
1991	Murder, She Wrote	Phyllis Gant	1 episode
1999	Providence	Diane Cavalero	1 episode
2000	Family Law	TV Announcer	1 episode
2010	Toon Wolf	Network President	1 episode
2013	Parole Officers	Marge	TV movie
