= Child Catcher =

Fictional character from Chitty Chitty Bang Bang

- Chitty Chitty Bang Bang character
- First appearance: Chitty Chitty Bang Bang
- Portrayed by: Sir Robert Helpmann

In-universe information
- Gender: Male
- Nationality: Vulgarian

The Child Catcher is a fictional character in the 1968 film Chitty Chitty Bang Bang and in the later stage musical adaptation. The Child Catcher is employed by the Baron and Baroness Bomburst to snatch and imprison children on the streets of Vulgaria.

The Child Catcher does not appear in Fleming's original book. Reputedly, Roald Dahl (co-author of the film's screenplay) created the character. Dahl's screenplay was heavily rewritten by Ken Hughes, the director, who said he had created the character.

== Portrayals ==
In the film, the Child Catcher was played by ballet dancer Sir Robert Helpmann. Whilst filming one of the scenes where the Child Catcher drives his horse and carriage out of the village, the carriage tipped over as it turned a corner with Helpmann on board. Dick Van Dyke recalls Helpmann, with great presence of mind, swinging out of the carriage and skipping across the crashing vehicle to safety. Van Dyke later commented that he had never seen anything as graceful in his life. Helpmann was 59 years old at the time of the film's release. Helpmann's child co-stars recalled that behind the scenes, the actor loved children and was extremely kind to them, often making them laugh between takes, which made it difficult for them to pretend to be afraid of him.

In the theatrical version in London's West End, he has been played by Richard O'Brien, Wayne Sleep (another ballet dancer), and Stephen Gately amongst others. On Broadway, he was played by Kevin Cahoon. In the Australian theatrical version, he was played by Tyler Coppin, who also wrote and performed LyreBird, Tales of Helpmann, a solo show about Robert Helpmann.

The Child Catcher also appeared in the 2012 Summer Olympics opening ceremony in London during a segment dedicated to classic villains of children's literature. He appeared alongside inflatable representations of Cruella de Vil, Lord Voldemort, The Queen of Hearts and Captain Hook. He is noticeably the only villain not to be an inflatable replica, instead being performed by a dancer.

== Reception ==
In 2005, the Child Catcher was voted "the scariest villain in children's books". In 2008, Entertainment Weekly called Helpmann's depiction of the Child Catcher one of the "50 Most Vile Movie Villains". According to Golan Moskowitz, the departmental chair for Jewish studies at the Tulane University School of Liberal Arts, the Child Catcher is reminiscent of antisemitic tropes such as blood libel – whereby Jews are accused of kidnapping and murdering Christian children.
