= The Chinese Wall (TV play) =

- Ad in The Age 17 April 1963
- Based on: play by Max Frisch
- Written by: Richard Lane
- Directed by: William Sterling
- Country of origin: Australia
- Original language: English

Production
- Running time: 75 minutes
- Production company: ABC

Original release
- Release: 17 April 1963

The Chinese Wall is a 1963 Australian television play. It was the television world premiere of a farce by contemporary Swiss playwright Max Frisch. The play first aired on 17 April 1963 in Melbourne and later on 15 May in Sydney.

== Plot ==
A modern character, The Contemporary, invites the audience to watch. He then becomes involved in the play's action.

In the second century BC the Emperor Hwang Ti is building the Great Wall of China "to hold up time and prevent all future." Historical characters from other ages meet him in his royal garden in order to tell him what they know of what is happening. Characters include Don Juan, Romeo and Juliet, Napoleon, Christopher Columbus, Brutus and Cleopatra. They submit their knowledge of collapsing empires and cvilisations, world wars and atom bombs, but cannot prevent evil.

== Cast ==
- Edward Brayshaw as The Contemporary
- Joan Letch as Olson, mother of the mute tortured, suspected of being the Voice of the People
- Carole Potter as the emperor's daughter, Princess Mee Lan
- Edward Howell as the Emperor of China
- David Mitchell as Wu Tsiang, a Chinese prince
- Sydney Conabere as Da Hing Yeng, the Emperor's Master of Revels

== Production ==
The play was first produced in 1946 but it achieved little success. Firsch later rewrote it following the success of his second play The Fire Raisers and it was produced successfully in theatres in Europe. It was translated into English from German only in 1962.

Sterling read the script in the ABC's head office in Sydney and wanted to produce it on Australian television. It was the first non-Australian play to have its world TV premiere in Melbourne during the past five years (that had been The Soldier's Tale starring Robert Helpmann directed by Sterling). "Frisch uses the stage to tell a message as well as entertain," said Sterling. "He is anti romantic. He hopes to achieve through the farce an awakening of the individual to his responsibilities."

According to one report, "The play's message is that mankind now has the means of destroying itself and must cope with this situation. Playwright Frisch chose the Chinese Wall as an allegorical basic for his play because it is one of the world's oldest constructions still standing in more or less its original state."

The play was experimental.

== Reception ==
The Age gave it a poor review saying the play was "ninety percent reiteration".

The Age, reviewing the year in TV drama, said Chinese Wall and Barnstable were examples of "highbrow productions of limited appeal" which "frustrated more than they entertained, among local productions."
