= The Coastwatchers (film) =

- Ad from the Age 25 Apr 1962
- Written by: John Sherman
- Directed by: Roger Mirams
- Starring: Ken Goodlet; Kevin Colson
- Country of origin: Australia
- Original language: English

Production
- Producer: Roger Mirams
- Cinematography: Roger Mirams; Bruce McNaughton
- Running time: 65 minutes or 51 mins
- Production company: Pacific Film Productions

Original release
- Network: ABV-2 (Melbourne)
- Release: 25 April 1962 (Melbourne, Brisbane, Sydney)

The Coastwatchers is a docudrama television film about coastwatchers made in 1959 by producer Roger Mirams for Pacific Films. It starred Ken Goodlet and Kevin Colson and was written by John Sherman and directed by Mirams.

It was a backdoor pilot for a TV series that did not eventuate. However Mirams later used the ideas for the series in Spyforce (1971–72).

The pilot was entitled "Operation Plum Pudding".

== Plot ==
During World War Two, Australian coastwatcher Don Marshall operates on a small island off New Guinea. He is entrusted with relaying information to Allied headquarters.

As the Japanese advance, Marshall learns that two civilians have not been evacuated. He knows that both are aware of his coastwatching activities, and that one of them - a German born planter - may betray him. When he learns that the daughter of one of the civilians has remained he must evacuate them on a destroyer.

The Japanese arrive on the island with dogs to track down Marshall. Marshall's radio batteries are running flat and to re-charge them he must use a noisy charger.

== Cast ==
- Ken Goodlet as Don Marshall
- Philip Stainton
- Peter Carver
- Kevin Colson
- Tekarpul
- James Okhi
- Patricia Kerr

== Production ==
Roger Mirams had worked for a number of years in New Zealand. He moved to Australia to cover the 1956 Olympic Games and decided to stay. He established an Australian subsidiary of Pacific Films in Melbourne, in partnership with Chris Stewart Jim Davies. Pacific's first Australian series was The Coastwatchers.

In May 1960 Mirams reported he was looking for a Catalina boat for the series, which he planned to make in New Guinea. "In a series such as this, accuracy and authenticity are vital," said Mirams. The series was inspired in part by a revival of interest following the election of John F. Kennedy to president; he owed his life to coastwatchers during the war.

Mirams shot two half hour pilots for the series. Shooting took place on location in New Guinea over a three week period in June 1960. Jimmy Okhi was an American born Japanese. Other non whites were played by various Chinese students from Hong Kong and Malaya.

The episodes were screened before members of both Houses of Parliament in Canberra in December 1960 as an example of the sort of work Australian producers could do in television. Mirams showed the episodes to Australian service chiefs in Canberra in March 1961.

Mirams sought finance to make 26 episodes but was not successful.

It was made with the co operation of Naval Intelligence and the Royal Papuan Constabulary.

== Reception ==
Famous coastwatcher Reg Evans, who helped save the life of John F. Kennedy, was shown a preview and said the show was "authentic in detail and an excellent portrayl of how things were for coast watching service."

The Age said "photography is striking and the story, leading to an action-filled climax, has a wide appeal." A reviewer from the same paper said it "was a brave try which carried considerable impact, held attention to the last and obviously was lovingly and proudly produced... an example of what Australian commercial enterprise can do... the action was sustained in a cat and mouse story that was good mass appeal stuff."

Filmink said Ken Goodlet was "born to play this type of role" and felt "Mirams could’ve easily expanded the running time to 80 minutes and had a decent B picture on his hands. As it is, The Coastwatchers makes a good, tight 51 minutes."
