= Unmasked Part 25 =

1988 British slasher film

- Promotional release poster
- Directed by: Anders Palm
- Written by: Mark Cutforth
- Produced by: Mark Cutforth
- Starring: Gregory Cox; Fiona Evans; Edward Brayshaw
- Cinematography: John de Borman
- Edited by: Brian Peachey
- Music by: Julian Wastall
- Release date: 1988
- Running time: 85 minutes
- Country: United Kingdom
- Language: English

Unmasked Part 25 (also known as The Hand of Death and Hand of Death Part 25: Jackson's Back) is a 1988 British slasher film directed by Anders Palm. Written and produced by Mark Cutforth, the film serves as both a horror film and a parody of the slasher genre, and the Friday the 13th film series in particular. It stars Gregory Cox as Jackson, a hockey mask-wearing serial killer who develops a romance with a blind woman named Shelly (played by Fiona Evans) and grows weary of his murderous ways. The film's cast also includes Edward Brayshaw as Jackson's father.

Unmasked Part 25 was shot on location in London, England, and was released direct-to-video. In 2019, the film was restored and released on DVD and Blu-ray by Vinegar Syndrome.

== Plot ==
In London, couple Pete and Ann are walking to a flat party when a stranger warns them not to enter the residence where the party is being held, claiming that an evil child was born there and that he has returned from a distant place in search of revenge. They ignore his warning and join their friends Patti, Mick, Monica and Shelly in the flat. Outside the party, Patti's date Albert is murdered by an assailant wearing a hockey goalie mask. Inside, Pete and Ann venture down into an unkempt room. The masked killer beats Pete to death with a shovel and fatally garrotes Ann. Mick and Monica go upstairs to have sex, and the killer impales them with a spear. The killer then murders Patti with a light fixture before dancing with her corpse while smoking a cigarette.

The killer walks downstairs, where he finds Shelly. She is blind, and believes that Patti set him up with her as her date. She brings him to her home, where he reveals that he can speak. The killer, whose name is Jackson and whose face is disfigured, says that he has never had anyone to talk to, and that people see him as a monster. Shelly and Jackson share a kiss and have sex. Jackson tells her that he was abused by his alcoholic father, and that Jackson and his mother moved to the United States when Jackson was young. Jackson was thought to have drowned at a camp one summer, but he had survived.

Jackson returns to the unkempt room in the house where he was born. His drunken father is there, and Jackson tells him about his feelings for Shelly, and that he does not want to kill any more people. His father, who was himself a murderer, berates and dismisses him. Later, Jackson and Shelly visit a Halloween mask store. Due to the goalie mask he wears, Shelly compares Jackson to a character in a film called The Hand of Death. Jackson, frustrated, replies, "don't you understand? I am that guy from the movies!" Shelly purchases a goalie mask of her own and the two go for a walk together.

One night, Jackson follows Shelly's friend Christi into a pub. Inside, patrons Nick, Mac and Barry believe Jackson to be an actor in the middle of a film production. When Jackson refuses to speak, Nick tries to remove his mask, and Jackson stabs him before fleeing the scene. Jackson returns home and kills his father by crushing his head. Later, Jackson and Shelly unsuccessfully attempt to engage in a BDSM session. Elsewhere, Christi, Mac and Barry bring Nick to a house, where they intend for Nick to recover from his stab wound.

On Friday the 13th, Jackson heads on foot to the house where Nick, Christi, Mac and Barry are staying. Mac strays into a nearby wooded area with a woman named Charlotte. Jackson confronts Charlotte, laments the dullness of his murder sprees, and advises her against running away since she will inevitably stumble and fall. As predicted, she falls while trying to flee, and he kills her with a pitchfork. Nick then wanders outside and is also killed by Jackson. Jackson enters the house, where he murders Barry with an axe and drives a cleaver into the face of Barry's partner Meagan. Jackson then pursues Christi, corners her in a shower and kills her. He later visits Shelly and attempts to break up with her, and she tells him that she is pregnant. Begging for her forgiveness, he slits her throat. He leaves and walks down the city streets, before falling to his knees in anguish when he sees a cinema marquee that reads The Hand of Death Part 26: Jackson Returns.

== Cast ==
- Gregory Cox as Jackson
- Fiona Evans as Shelly
- Edward Brayshaw as Father
- Debbie Lee London as Christi
- Kim Fenton as Nick
- Anna Conrich as Ann
- Robin Welch as Pete
- Christian Brando as Albert
- Annabel Yuresha as Patti
- Adrian Hough as Mick
- Helen Rochelle as Monica
- Howard Martin as Mac
- Lucy Hornak as Charlotte
- Steve Dixon as Barry
- Morie Kelly as Meagan

== Production ==
Unmasked Part 25 was intended as a parody of the slasher film genre and the concept of sequel films. After watching a number of installments in the Friday the 13th film series over a weekend, writer and producer Mark Cutforth had the idea to parody the franchise. In Unmasked Part 25, Jackson is implied to be Jason Voorhees from the Friday the 13th films, as he is said to have survived a drowning at an American summer camp and murdered a number of camp counselors. Cutforth, who studied as an English major, also drew inspiration from the metafictional aspects of the 1921 play Six Characters in Search of an Author by Luigi Pirandello.

The inclusion of Part 25 in the film's title is a reference to the numerous sequels in the Friday the 13th series. Palm has stated that Unmasked Part 25 was the original title of the film, while Cutforth has said that the original title was The Hand of Death, and that it was changed to Unmasked Part 25 for marketing purposes in order to avoid confusion with the 1976 martial arts film of a similar name. Despite this, The Hand of Death (a title Cutforth derived from a poem by Lord Byron) appears as the film's on-screen title.

The film was shot on location in London, England because director Palm was living in the city at the time of the film's production, as were the film's financiers. The final scene in the film, in which Jackson sees a cinema marquee reading The Hand of Death Part 26: Jackson Returns, was shot on Baker Street. The special make-up effects were provided by Cliff Wallace and Stuart Conran, who had previously worked on Hellraiser (1987).

== Release ==
Unmasked Part 25 was screened for potential distributors in England and New York, including Films Around the World. The distribution rights were acquired by Fox Lorber Features, and the film was released directly to home video. It was shown at the Avoriaz Fantastic Film Festival in Avoriaz, France.

== Critical reception ==
Brian Orndorf of Blu-ray.com wrote that the film "weirdly [tries] to be sincere when asking the question, 'What if Jason Voorhees was lonely?'" He called it "tonally confused" and "a frustrating viewing experience", writing that the film's "execution is sluggish, whiffing with humor and elongating scenes of conversational bonding, finding excessive length a major issue with the endeavor, especially when it doesn't want to become the farce it initially promises to be."

Tracy Allen of PopHorror.com, whose review of Unmasked Part 25 is approved by the review aggregator website Rotten Tomatoes, praised the special effects and humour in the film, and wrote that she "honestly can't believe this film isn't more well known. It has the humor, gore and kill count to make it one of the best meta horror films out there."

== Home media ==
In 1989, Unmasked Part 25 was released on VHS and Betamax by Academy Entertainment. On 29 October 2019, a 2K restoration of the film was released on DVD and Blu-ray by Vinegar Syndrome.
