= The Display =

Australian ballet

The Display is an Australian ballet produced and choreographed by Robert Helpmann to music by Malcolm Williamson for The Australian Ballet. Described as the first wholly Australian ballet, The Display had an all-Australian cast, with sets and costumes by artist Sidney Nolan. The work had its world premiere on 14 March 1964 at Her Majesty's Theatre in Adelaide as part of the Adelaide Festival of Arts.

== Background ==
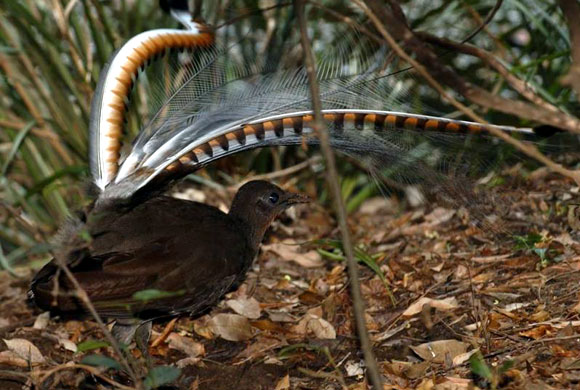
Superb Lyrebird in courtship display

The inspiration for The Display came to Robert Helpmann in a dream in which he saw his friend, Hollywood actress Katharine Hepburn, naked on a dais surrounded by lyrebirds. Several years earlier, in 1955, Hepburn (then touring Australia with the Old Vic) took Helpmann to Sherbrooke Forest within Victoria's Dandenong Ranges to see his first lyrebirds in their natural surroundings. Helpmann was "fascinated for hours" by the birds' fanciful mating dance, referred to in ornithology as a courtship display, which Helpmann chose for the ballet's title. Helpmann eventually dedicated The Display to Hepburn.

The Display draws parallels between the courtship rituals of the lyrebird and the mateship displayed by a group of Australian men as they attempt to seduce a woman at a bush picnic. The men play a game of Australian rules football, a sequence for which Helpmann invited VFL great Ron Barassi to coach the dancers.

Australian author and playwright Patrick White was originally approached by Helpmann to write the scenario for The Display, however, the two artists had a falling out over White's interpretation of Helpmann's vision, and White's libretto was rejected. For decades, it was assumed lost until dance historian Michelle Potter chanced upon a copy in the National Library entitled A scenario for a ballet by Patrick White.

== Cast ==
The first cast was:

- Kathleen Gorham (Female)
- Barry Kitcher (Male/Lyrebird)
- Garth Welch (Outsider)
- Bryan Lawrence (Leader)
