= Till Death Do Us Part (1959 film) =

- Based on: play by Paolo Levi
- Written by: Robert Rietti
- Directed by: Christopher Muir
- Starring: Edward Brayshaw; Frank Gatliff; Syd Conabere; Ken Goodlet; Edward Howell; Robin Ramsay
- Country of origin: Australia
- Original language: English

Production
- Running time: 60 mins
- Production company: ABC

Original release
- Release: 22 April 1959 (Melbourne, live)
- Release: 6 May 1959 (Sydney, taped)

Till Death Do Us Part is a 1959 Australian television play based on a stage lay that had been adapted for radio. The TV play was broadcast live in Melbourne, recorded, and was shown in Sydney.

== Premise ==
In Italy, a man called Roberto is on his way to meet Grazia. A stranger warns him that the woman will murder him for his money, but if he stays away, the woman will come running. Grazia is married to a gangster. He then discovers that the gangster wants to kill him.

== Cast ==
- Edward Brayshaw as Roberto
- Maree Tomasetti as Grazia
- Frank Gatliff as the gangster
- Syd Conabere
- Ken Goodlet
- Edward Howell
- Keith Hudson
- Georgina Batterham
- Kurt Ludescher
- Robin Ramsay

== Production ==
The play had previously been filmed as "Strange Meeting", an episode of Armchair Theatre in the UK. It had also been performed on Australian radio in 1958.

It was decided not to require the actors to use Italian accents. Director Christopher Muir said the play was of particular interest because "of the flashbacks, the movements in time and space and the exciting visual possibilities provided by the settings." It was the first contemporary European drama made by the ABC.

Part of the play was shot at Sandringham Beach. This scene involved Edward Brayshaw and Maree Tomasetti.

== Reception ==
The critic for The Sydney Morning Herald said that:

A neat little idea for suspense, with a wry ironic twist, faltered, through common place writing and unsubtle acting...better writing, direction and acting could have pointed up this dilemma more grippingly, as the story moved forward through its half-dozen episodes—what might happen, what has happened, what does happen; all of it while the young man and the sardonic old scoffer wrangle quarrelsomely in a dingy street. Edward Brayshaw, as the young man, was the production's main weakness. The immaturity of the schoolboyish sarcasm in his anger was matched by the discomfort by which he approached the lyrically flowery love-talk allotted to him by the script: "From now on my life will write only your name," and other such nosegays of verbiage. Marie Tomasetti performed competently as the mystery woman, without suggesting (hat there could be depth and aches and necessities even in such a gangland woman. Frank Gatliff, using a rather big Shakespearean style with a Claude Rains bias, was the sardonic scoffer, but too monotonously in the one mood to be always appreciated as much as he Was at first. The dressing and the 'sets, so cramped in space that the characters could be allowed hardly any significant movement about the scene, were shoddy.

== See also ==
- List of live television plays broadcast on Australian Broadcasting Corporation (1950s)
