= The Kitchen (1961 film) =

British drama by James Hill

- DVD cover
- Directed by: James Hill
- Written by: Sidney Cole; Arnold Wesker
- Based on: The Kitchen (play) by Arnold Wesker
- Produced by: Sidney Cole
- Starring: Carl Möhner; Mary Yeomans; Brian Phelan; Tom Bell; Eric Pohlmann
- Music by: David Lee
- Production company: Eyeline Productions
- Distributed by: British Lion Films
- Release date: August 1961
- Running time: 76 minutes
- Country: United Kingdom
- Language: English
- Budget: £27,246

The Kitchen is a 1961 British drama film directed by James Hill and starring Carl Möhner, Mary Yeomans, Brian Phelan, Tom Bell, Eric Pohlmann and James Bolam. The script was by Sidney Cole and Arnold Wesker, based on the 1957 stage play of the same name by Wesker. It was produced by Cole for Act Films Ltd. The film follows the dozen staff in a restaurant's kitchen during the course of one busy morning.

It features a musical interlude when all the staff dance to the song "What's Cookin'" by Adam Faith.

== Plot ==
There is no traditional plot. The film looks at the various relationships between different staff members, a large part having immigrated from Continental Europe. The kitchen staff is almost exclusively male and the waiting staff is exclusively female. The presence of one new member of staff allows each person to be introduced in turn. The owner wanders around checking things. The story looks at the workplace stress, unhealthy environment, bickering between staff, petty thievery, and rather excessive drinking of more than one staff member.

== Cast ==
- Carl Möhner as Peter
- Mary Yeomans as Monica
- Brian Phelan as Kevin
- Tom Bell as Paul
- Howard Greene as Raymond
- Eric Pohlmann as Mr Marango the owner
- James Bolam as Michael
- Scott Finch as Hans
- Gertan Klauber as Gaston
- Martin Boddey as Max
- Sean Lynch as Dimitri
- Josef Behrmann as Magi
- George Eugeniou as Nick
- Frank Pettitt as Frank
- Charles Lloyd-Pack as chef
- Frank Atkinson as Alfred
- Rosalind Knight as waitress
- Claire Nielson as waitress (credited as Claire Isbister)

== Reception ==
The Monthly Film Bulletin wrote: "Arnold Wesker's kitchen is the world in microcosm ... It is, of course, a fine playwright's symbol; but the audience might have been left to work it out for themselves, rather than having it thrown at them repeatedly and explicitly. This nervous over-emphasis becomes the film's main characteristic, partly because James Hill, directing his first feature, underlines every point already made verbally. The effect on stage is presumably of work and talk co-existing. But the more obvious realism of the screen splits up these two elements in the play; the dialogue is switched off, as it were, for the lunch-time rush sequence, all close-ups, nervous cutting, and images of hissing, bubbling, unappetising food. The sequence in which the cooks are persuaded to dream, to step outside their world, becomes not poetic but naive – again, we are brought too close to it but not taken into it. Some of the performances (Tom Bell, Brian Phelan, Sean Lynch, Frank Atkinson) have the right authenticity; some, such as Mary Yeomans', are badly under-directed. Altogether this brave A.C.T. Films venture, made with N.F.F.C. backing on a second-feature budget, has overreached itself. The play needs precision treatment, and here everything crude and naive in its writing is made to stand out."

The Radio Times Guide to Films gave the film 3/5 stars, writing: "Dramatist Arnold Wesker drew on his experience as a pastry chef when he wrote his play, The Kitchen, here filmed with some of the cast from the original London stage production. ... The long, philosophical conversations do not adapt well to the screen, but the sequences showing food being churned out factory-style to the detriment of the workers' mental and physical health have a manic intensity. In its day, the play was regarded as an allegory of life's struggle."
