= Deadly Lessons =

1983 television film

- Print advertisement
- Written by: Jennifer A. Miller
- Directed by: William Wiard
- Starring: Donna Reed; Larry Wilcox; David Ackroyd; Diane Franklin; Ally Sheedy; Nancy Cartwright; Bill Paxton
- Music by: Ian Freebairn-Smith
- Country of origin: United States
- Original language: English

Production
- Executive producer: Leonard Goldberg
- Producer: Ervin Zavada
- Cinematography: Andrew Jackson
- Editor: Jack Harnish
- Running time: 100 minutes
- Production company: Leonard Goldberg Productions

Original release
- Network: ABC
- Release: March 7, 1983

Deadly Lessons (also known as Highschool Killer) is a 1983 American made-for-television horror film starring Donna Reed, Larry Wilcox, David Ackroyd, Diane Franklin, Ally Sheedy, and Nancy Cartwright. The film premiered on ABC on March 7, 1983.

== Plot ==
A teenaged girl, Stephanie Aggiston, is sent to Starkwater Hall Boarding School, a prestigious private girl's academy, for the summer to brush up on advanced French. Stephanie is a country girl and finds the school to be a bit snobbish. She makes friends with Marita Armstrong, Calli and Shama, who is a Saudi princess and her roommate.

Murders began occurring and Det. Russ Kemper comes to investigate. As more girls are killed, everyone worries about who will be next. Stephanie attempts to find the murderer herself. She enlists the help of the new attractive stable boy, Eddie Fox, who falls in love with her for 'not being like the other girls.' Suspicion soon falls on Eddie as the murderer.

As the summer progresses, the girls are slowly evacuated from the school. Marita is kidnapped on the day she is set to leave by the school's janitor, Robert Hartigan. Robert binds and gags Marita in his quarters on campus, somehow deluded into thinking his daughter was Marita's mother (which is not true). When Marita is able to signal for help from her captivity, Stephanie has Kemper follow her as she heads out "alone" to attract Robert's attention, allowing Kemper to make an arrest and save Marita.

Later, Stephanie is ambushed and chased by a mysterious figure, dressed all in black. The person is revealed to be Kemper, the real killer. The first death, Tember Logan, was an accident, as she drowned. It gave Kemper the idea to kill the other victims as a means of getting revenge on Miss Wade, who is revealed to be his mother, for abandoning him as a child. The murders were a means of ruining the reputations of both the school and her. He is apprehended and taken away.

== Cast ==
- Donna Reed as Miss Wade, School's Headmistress
- Larry Wilcox as Detective Russ Kemper
- David Ackroyd as John Ferrar
- Diane Franklin as Stephanie Aggiston
- Ally Sheedy as Marita Armstrong
- Donald Hotton as Robert Hartigan
- Deena Freeman as Lauren Peele
- Vicki Kriegler as Shama
- Krista Errickson as Tember Logan
- Bill Paxton as Eddie Fox
- Renée Jones as Calli
- Nancy Cartwright as Libby Dean
- Robin Gammell as Morgan Rank
- Rick Rossovich as Craig
- Ellen Geer as Mrs. Grant
