= Tyler Coppin =

American–Australian actor

- Born: Tyler Jon Coppin; 9 November 1956 (age 69); Roseville, California
- Occupations: Actor, Playwright, American Dialect Coach
- Years active: 1980–present

Tyler Coppin (born 9 November 1956) is an American-Australian actor, playwright and American dialect coach for actors in film, television and theatre.

== Personal life and education ==
Coppin is a fourth-generation Californian born in Roseville, California, the second child of Ronald and Gayle (Terry) Coppin. He was raised in the Sacramento suburbs of Rancho Cordova and Carmichael, California. The Coppin family are also long-term residents of Stinson Beach, California. Coppin attended Rio Americano High School and California State University, Sacramento before migrating to Australia aged 19, where he attended and graduated from the National Institute of Dramatic Art.

He divides his time between the United States and Australia after residing in Sydney for many years working in theatre, film and television. In 2001 Coppin moved to Melbourne with Jane Borghesi where the couple married in 2006. They have one son.

He became an Australian citizen in 1993.

== Career ==
Coppin's many stage appearances include the Child Catcher in the Australian national production of Chitty Chitty Bang Bang, Mr Mushnik in the 2016 Australian national tour of Little Shop of Horrors, Robert Helpmann in his one-man play Lyrebird: Tales of Helpmann, and Puck in the acclaimed Opera Australia production of Benjamin Britten's A Midsummer Night's Dream directed by Baz Luhrmann with set and costumes by Catherine Martin. In 1989, at the request of playwright Patrick White he played the role of Young Manitoba in the Sydney Theatre Company production of The Ham Funeral, directed by Neil Armfield.

Coppin has appeared in the Melbourne Theatre Company's production of Born Yesterday, His Girl Friday, Ruby Moon, A Behanding in Spokane by playwright Martin McDonagh, and as Vice Principal Panch in The 25th Annual Putnam County Spelling Bee, for which he wrote additional material.

His television appearances include Nightmares and Dreamscapes: From the Stories of Stephen King and Neighbours.

His film appearances include Hacksaw Ridge directed by Mel Gibson, The Spierig Brothers' Winchester and Predestination, The Death and Life of Otto Bloom, The Tender Hook, Emulsion, One Night Stand, Lorca and the Outlaws and Mad Max 2.

Coppin is also a dialect coach of the American accent, having started training actors during the 1980's Australian New Wave film era. These include Heath Ledger, Melissa George, Joel Edgerton, Magda Szubanski, Ben Mendelsohn, Colin Friels, Marcus Graham, Madeleine Madden and Mavournee Hazel.

He has also narrated several audiobooks, including an adaptation of the American children's TV series Bear in the Big Blue House, released by ABC for Kids.

== Credits ==
=== Film ===
Year	Title	Role	Notes
1981	The Survivor	Boy	Feature film
1981	Mad Max 2	Defiant Victim	Feature film
1984	One Night Stand	Sam	Feature film
1984	Starship (aka 2084 or Lorca & the Outlaws)	Detective Droid	Feature film
1987	Twelfth Night	Party Guest	TV film
1993	Sniper	Ripoly	Feature film
1993	Reckless Kelly	Hollywood Bank Teller	Feature film
1996	Race the Sun	Bob Radford	Feature film
1996	The Beast	Harry	TV movie
1997	Doing Time for Patsy Cline	Bobby Joe	Feature film
2001	Jet Set	Jim	
2005	Three Dollars	Giles	Feature film
2006	Emulsion	Agent	
2008	The Tender Hook (aka Boxer and the Bombshell)	Donnie	Feature film
2009	Accidents Happen	Narrator	Feature film
2014	Predestination	Dr. Heinlein	Feature film
2016	The Death and Life of Otto Bloom	J.C. Tippit	Feature film
2016	Hacksaw Ridge	Lynchburg Doctor	Feature film
2018	Winchester	Arthur Gates	Feature film
2021	Lone Wolf	Hippy Karl	Feature film
2026	Thrash	Trent	Feature film

==== As writer ====
Year	Title	Role	Notes
2006	Happy Feet	Contributing writer	Animated feature film

=== Television ===
Year	Title	Role	Notes
1982	Play School	Host	TV series
2006	Nightmares and Dreamscapes: From the Stories of Stephen King	Richard Fornoy	TV anthology series
2020	Neighbours	Basil Gardener (recurring role)	TV series

=== Stage ===
==== As actor ====
Year	Title	Role	Notes
1979	Lower Depths		NIDA Theatre, Sydney
1979	The Beggar's Opera		NIDA Theatre, Sydney, Playhouse, Canberra
1979	The Ballad of the Sad Café		NIDA Theatre, Sydney
1979	Rumpelstiltskin	Rumpelstiltskin	Parramatta Town Hall with Australian Elizabethan Theatre Trust
1980	Danton's Death	Saint Just / Beggar	Stables Theatre, Sydney with Griffin Theatre Company
1980	Inside the Island	Andy	Nimrod Theatre, Sydney
1980	Volpone		Nimrod Theatre, Sydney
1981	The Choir	Michael	Nimrod Theatre, Sydney, Universal Theatre, Melbourne
1982	You Can't Take It With You		Sydney Opera House with STC for Sydney Festival
1984	1984 A.D.		Arts Theatre, Adelaide with Australian Elizabethan Theatre Trust for Adelaide Festival
1986	The Philadelphia Story		Sydney Opera House with STC
1987	The Country Wife		Sydney Opera House with STC
1987	Travelling Light		Studio Theatre for Melbourne Festival of the Arts
1988	Haircut		Wharf Theatre, Sydney with Six Years Old Theatre Company
1988	Strictly Ballroom		Wharf Theatre, Sydney, with Six Years Old Theatre Company
1988	Angels		Wharf Theatre, Sydney, with Six Years Old Theatre Company
1989	The Ham Funeral	Young Manitoba	Wharf Theatre with STC
1990	Three Sisters		Sydney Opera House with STC
1991	Buzz		Belvoir Street Theatre, Sydney
1992	Much Ado About Nothing		Sydney Opera House with STC
1992	The Heidi Chronicles		Ensemble Theatre, Sydney
1992	The Cockroach Opera		Belvoir Street Theatre, Sydney
1992	The Real Live Brady Bunch	Greg Brady	University of Sydney with Footbridge Theatre
1993	The Real Live Brady Bunch - and the Real Live Game Show	Greg Brady	Comedy Club, Melbourne for Melbourne International Comedy Festival
1993–94	A Midsummer Night's Dream	Singer	Sydney Opera House, State Theatre, Melbourne with Opera Australia
1993–94; 1995; 1997	Picasso at the Lapin Agile	Picasso	Belvoir Theatre Company, Malthouse Theatre, Melbourne, with Playbox Theatre Company with Melbourne International Arts Festival, Playhouse Adelaide, Belvoir Street Theatre, Sydney, Melbourne Athenaeum
1994	Short Circuits		Seymour Centre, Sydney, for Sydney Festival
1995	Tales of Helpmann	Robert Helpmann	Bondi Pavilion
1995	Tales of Helpmann (Bobby's Fluffy Trip)	Robert Helpmann	Performance Space, Sydney
1995	Saint Joan		Sydney Opera House
1996	A Midsummer Night's Dream		Sydney Opera House
1996	Wasp	Son	Belvoir Street Theatre, Sydney
1997	Pageant	Miss Texas	Harry M Miller
1998–99	Lyrebird: Tales of Helpmann	Robert Helpmann	Q Theatre, Penrith, Price Theatre, Adelaide, Sydney Opera House, Downstage Theatre, Wellington, Playhouse, Canberra, Cochrane Theatre, London
2000	The Small Poppies		Butter Factory Theatre, Wodonga
2001	Helpmann Awards 2001		Lyric Theatre, Sydney
2001	Emma's Nose: A Comedy of Eros	Freud	Belvoir Street Theatre, Sydney
2002–03	Cabaret	Ernst Ludwig	State Theatre, Sydney, Her Majesty's Theatre, Melbourne, Festival Theatre, Adelaide
2003	A Midsummer Night's Dream	Puck	Sydney Opera House
2004	Run Rabbit Run	Andrew Denton / Roger Harvey / John Hartigan / Tom Cocking	Belvoir Street Theatre, Sydney
2006; 2007	The 25th Annual Putnam County Spelling Bee	Vice Principal Douglas Panch	Playhouse, Melbourne, Sydney Theatre
2006–08	Lyrebird: Tales of Helpmann	Robert Helpmann	Space Theatre, Adelaide & Australian regional tour
2007	Homebody / Kabul		Trades Hall, Melbourne
2009	B.C.		BlackBox, Melbourne
2010	Ruby Moon		Southbank Theatre, Melbourne, with MTC
2011	A Behanding in Spokane	Mervyn	Southbank Theatre with MTC
2011	At Any Cost?	Brother	The J Theatre, Noosa, Ensemble Theatre, Sydney
2012	His Girl Friday	McCue	Playhouse, Melbourne with MTC
2012	Chitty Chitty Bang Bang	Child Catcher	Capitol Theatre, Sydney, Her Majesty's Theatre, Melbourne, Festival Theatre, Adelaide, Malthouse Theatre, Melbourne, Crown Theatre, Perth, Lyric Theatre, Brisbane
2013	The Dragon		Malthouse Theatre, Melbourne
2014–15	Strictly Ballroom the Musical	Terry Best	Sydney Lyric Theatre, Her Majesty's Theatre, Melbourne, Lyric Theatre, Brisbane with Global Creatures
2016	Little Shop of Horrors	Mr Mushnik	Hayes Theatre Company, Her Majesty's Theatre, Adelaide, Comedy Theatre, Melbourne, Canberra Theatre, Playhouse, Brisbane, Roslyn Packer Theatre, Sydney, His Majesty's Theatre, Perth
2016	Dusty the Original Pop Diva	Gerard O'Brien / Jerry Wexler / Drag Queen	Playhouse, Melbourne with Adelaide Festival Centre
2017	Born Yesterday	Ed Devery	Southbank Theatre, Melbourne, Canberra Theatre with MTC
2019	Shakespeare in Love	Wabash / Lambert	Playhouse, Melbourne with MTC
	Glengarry Glen Ross	Sydney Opera House	

==== As playwright / writer / director ====
Year	Title	Role	Notes
1987	Flabbadadabbadadaddy-o!	Co-writer	Melbourne International Comedy Festival
1988	Haircut	Contributing writer	STC
1991	Buzz	Co-writer / Director	Belvoir Street Theatre, Sydney
1992	Dance Camp 3	Director	Belvoir Street Theatre for Sydney Gay and Lesbian Mardi Gras
1995	Tales of Helpmann	Actor / Writer	Bondi Pavilion, Performance Space, Sydney
1998–99; 2006–08	Lyrebird: Tales of Helpmann	Playwright	Sydney Opera House, Edinburgh Festival Fringe, City of London Festival, Australia, New Zealand, United States
2004	UnAmerica	Playwright	Shortlisted for 2004 Rodney Seaborn Playwrights Award
2005	The Minutiae of Inertia	Playwright	Melbourne Fringe Festival
2006; 2007	The 25th Annual Putnam County Spelling Bee	Additional written material written	Playhouse, Melbourne, Sydney Theatre
	Strictly Ballroom	Contributing writer	
	Death of Cook	Contributing writer	Performance Space, Sydney
	No One Here Gets Out Awake	Playwright	
	Clover	Playwright	

=== Dialect coach ===
Year	Title	Role	Notes
1989	Speed-the-Plow	American Dialect Coach	MTC stage production
1995	Babe	American Dialect Coach	Feature film
1996	Peter Benchley's The Beast	American Dialect Coach	TV movie
1996	Race the Sun	American Dialect Coach	Feature film
1998	Dark City	Dialogue Coach	Feature film
2003	The Night We Called It a Day	American Dialect Coach (Nicholas Hope)	Feature film
2006	Superman Returns	American Dialect Coach	Feature film
2009	Where the Wild Things Are	American Dialect Coach (uncredited)	Feature film
2010	Torn	American Dialect Coach	
2019	The Strange Chores	American Dialect Coach	TV series
2021	The Vortex	Dialect Coach	Short film
2021–24	La Brea	American Dialect Coach	TV series

== Awards ==
Nominated work	Award	Category	Result
Lyrebird: Tales of Helpmann	Edinburgh Fringe Festival	Fringe First Award	Won
The 25th Annual Putnam County Spelling Bee	Helpmann Awards	Best Supporting Actor	Won
Chitty Chitty Bang Bang	Green Room Awards	Best Supporting Actor	Won
