= The Pearl Fishers (film) =

- Based on: Les pêcheurs de perles by Georges Bizet
- Directed by: William Sterling
- Country of origin: Australia
- Original language: English

Production
- Running time: 115 minutes
- Production company: Australian Broadcasting Commission

Original release
- Release: 3 April 1963

The Pearl Fishers is a 1963 Australian television production based on the opera Les pêcheurs de perles by Georges Bizet. It was filmed in Sydney at the ABC's Gore Hill studios and marked the one hundredth anniversary of the first performance of the opera. The Pearl Fishers originally aired on 3 April 1963 in Sydney and later on 29 May 1963.

== Cast ==
- Rosalind Keene (soprano) as Leila
- Ronal Jackson (baritone) as Zurga
- Raymond McDonald (tenor) as Nadir

Keene and Jackson appear in the production, but not McDonald; Edward Brayshaw mimes and lip-synchs the role of Nadir.

== Reception ==
The critic from the Sydney Morning Herald wrote that, "it may be that producer William Stirling doubted that the music could hold the viewers' interest should the action flag for a moment, for his sets were distractingly cluttered up at times. He also used such film techniques as flashbacks, and in the love duel the closeup was excessive. The flames in which Ronal Jackson expired at the end of the opera were a further innovation; such an impressively elaborate production obviously cried out for colour television."

The production sold widely overseas.
