= Edward Brayshaw =

Australian actor (1933–1990)

- Photo: David Myles, 1976
- Born: Edward John Brayshaw; 18 October 1933; Central Coast, New South Wales, Australia
- Died: 28 December 1990 (aged 57); London, England
- Occupation: Actor

Edward John Brayshaw (18 October 1933 – 28 December 1990) was an Australian actor who worked in Australia and England.

== Australian career ==
He was a Melbourne-based actor in the 1950s and 1960s and often appeared on television and stage. He left Australia for England in May 1963.

== British career ==
His television roles include the part of Rochefort in the 1966 serial The Three Musketeers and 1967's The Further Adventures of the Musketeers. He is perhaps most recognised for playing Harold Meaker in the children's series Rentaghost, throughout its eight-year run on BBC1.

He often appeared in TV adventure series, taking roles in several ITC series including The Saint, The Baron (in two episodes but in different roles), The Champions and Return of the Saint, often in villainous roles. In The Champions, for example, he played a mob boss and again as a mob boss in the classic episode A Cellar Full of Silence in Department S. He appeared twice in Doctor Who: first as Léon Colbert in 1964's The Reign of Terror, and second as the War Chief, one of the main villains in the 1969 serial The War Games. He appeared in the 1969 Avengers episode "Homicide and Old Lace", which had been re-edited from an unfinished story entitled "The Great Great Britain Crime". Later roles included The Bill and Bergerac.

Brayshaw also appeared in various television commercials, including a 1980s advert for the Nationwide Building Society.

Brayshaw died of throat cancer on 28 December 1990.

== Filmography ==
=== Film ===
- 633 Squadron (1964) as Pilot
- Unmasked Part 25 (1988) as Father

=== TV films ===
- Sound of Thunder (1957) as Pietro
- Gaslight (1958)
- Killer in Close-Up (1958) - "The Rattenbury Case" as Stoner
- The Soldier's Tale (1958)
- One Morning Near Troodos (1959)
- Till Death Do Us Part (1959) as Roberto
- Treason (1959)
- Heart Attack (1960) as Pearce
- Dark Under the Sun (1960) as Jim Robertson
- Who Killed Kovali? (1960) as Dimitri Rikhjovic
- Mine Own Executioner (1960) as Adam Lucian
- Burst of Summer (1961) as Mervyn Holmes
- The Ides of March (1961) as Catullus
- Two-Headed Eagle (1960) as Stanislav
- The Lady from the Sea (1961)
- Murder in the Cathedral (1962)
- Shadow of the Vine (1962) as Julian Heath
- The Music Upstairs (1962) as Tom
- The Pearl Fishers (1963) as Nadir
- The Chinese Wall (1963) as The Contemporary

=== TV series ===
- Festival (1964) as Le Comte de Soria (episode: "The Master of Santiago")
- Theatre 625 (1964) as S.S. Man (season 1, episode 3: "The Seekers: The Materialists")
- Judith Paris (1964) as George Paris (episode: "Rogue's Daughter")
- Doctor Who (1964) as Léon Colbert (season 1, serial 8: The Reign of Terror)
- Danger Man (1965) as Vernon Brooks (episode: "Parallel Lines Sometimes Meet")
- A Man Called Harry Brent (1965) as Harry Brent
- Mystery and Imagination (1966) as Adrian Temple (episode: "The Lost Stradivarius")
- Quick Before They Catch Us (1966) as Quinn (episode: "Power of Three: Part 1")
- Armchair Theatre (1966) as Thornton Garfield (episode: "The Wager")
- The Three Musketeers (1966) as Rochefort
- The Baron (1966) as Shamir (3 episodes)
- The Further Adventures of the Musketeers (1967)
- The Saint (1967) as Pietro (episode: "Legacy for the Saint")
- Adam Adamant Lives! (1967) as Gladwin (episode: "Face in a Mirror")
- Softly, Softly (1967) as George Kent (episode: "See You Tomorrow")
- Virgin of the Secret Service (1968) as Yuente (episode: "Across the Silver Pass of Gusri Song")
- ITV Playhouse (1968) as Dr. Khobotov (episode: "If Only the Trains Come")
- The Champions (1969) as Del Marco (episode: "A Case of Lemmings")
- Doctor Who (1969) as the War Chief (season 6, serial 7: The War Games)
- Department S (1969) as Victor Kent ("A Cellar Full of Silence")
- The Avengers (1969) (episode: "Homicide & Old Lace")
- Counterstrike (1969) as Chief of Control (episode: "Out of Mind")
- Randall and Hopkirk (Deceased) (1970) as Paul Lang (episode 23: "The Trouble with Women")
- Moonbase 3 (1973) as Adam Blaney (episode 3: "Achilles Heel")
- Black Arrow (1974–75) as Zac (3 episodes)
- The Changes (1975) (episode 4: "Hostages")
- Rentaghost (1976–84) as Harold Meaker
- Return of the Saint (1979) as Oscar West (2 episodes)
- The Bill (1984) as Film Director (episode: It's "Not Such a Bad Job After All')
- Bergerac

== Theatre ==
- One Bright Day (1957)
- Nude with Violin (1958)
- King Lear (1959)
- Pirates at the Barn (1960)
- Traveller without Luggage (1960)
- Private Lives (1960)
- The Caretaker (1961)
- The Naked Island (1962)
- Shipwreck (1962)
- Saint Joan (1962)
- The Tenth Man (1962)
- Write Me a Murder (1962)
