= Blood Relations (Malouf play) =

Play by David Malouf, set in Western Australia

- Original language: English
- Written by: David Malouf
- Genre: drama

Premiere
- Date: 24 June 1987
- Place: Sydney
- Directed by: Jim Sharman

Blood Relations is a play by David Malouf. Set in tropical Western Australia, it concerns a family group gathering around patriarch Willy at Christmas. It has been described as an Australian re-telling of The Tempest.

First produced in a Sydney Theatre Company and State Theatre Company of South Australia co-production, it opened on 24 June 1987 at the Sydney Opera House's Drama Theatre directed by Jim Sharman.

Blood Relations received the 1987 NSW Premier's Literary Award in the Play category.

== See also ==
- 1987 in Australian literature
