= Second Time Lucky =

1984 film by Michael Anderson

- Theatrical release poster
- Directed by: Michael Anderson
- Written by: Ross Dimsey; Howard Grigsby; Alan Byrnes (story); David Sigmund (story)
- Produced by: Antony I. Ginnane
- Starring: Diane Franklin; Roger Wilson; Robert Morley; Robert Helpmann; John Michael Howson
- Cinematography: John R. McLean
- Edited by: Tony Paterson
- Music by: Garry McDonald; Laurie Stone
- Production companies: Broadbank Investments; Eadenrock Ltd.
- Distributed by: Kerridge Odeon (New Zealand) (all media)
- Release date: 1984
- Running time: 101 minutes
- Country: New Zealand
- Language: English
- Budget: $5.5 million

Second Time Lucky is a 1984 New Zealand erotic comedy film directed by Michael Anderson and starring Diane Franklin and Roger Wilson. The story centres on God and the Devil making a bet on the definitive salvation or condemnation of humanity, as well as the couple that will decide mankind's fate.

== Synopsis ==
Satan calls God by phone and asks him how is he doing, and if he is not tired of their eternal dispute for mankind's fate. Both decide to set up a definitive game, which will decide if humans deserve one last chance to reach Heaven or if they will be condemned forever to hell. They settle that Eve and Adam, an ordinary 20th Century couple, will be their "players"; travelling through time while fighting (or giving in) to temptation and carnal desire. Adam and Eve are then plunged back through time into a series of tableaus to test them: the Garden of Eden, Ancient Rome, World War I, The Roaring Twenties and current modern times.

== Cast ==
- Diane Franklin as Eve
- Roger Wilson as Adam Smith
- Jon Gadsby as the Angel Gabriel
- Robert Helpmann as the Devil
- Robert Morley as God
- John Michael Howson as the Devil's Assistant
- Bill Ewens as Chuck
- Eunice Ewens as Abby
- Erna Larsen as Suzy
- John Hudson as Jimmy
- Gay Dean as Spinster
- Brenda Kendall as Dykin
- Onno Boelee as Ripperus
- Melissa Miles as Sue
- Paul Owen-Lowe as Roman guard
- Derek Payne as Colonel Anderson
- Norman Fairley as German officer
- David Weatherley as British officer
- Don Kjestrup as Inn-keeper
- Bob Parker as Interviewer
