= The Music Upstairs =

- Written by: Michael Noonan
- Directed by: William Sterling
- Country of origin: Australia
- Original language: English

Production
- Running time: 60 mins
- Production company: ABC

Original release
- Network: ABC
- Release: 3 October 1962 (Melbourne, live)
- Release: 7 November 1962

The Music Upstairs is a 1962 Australian television play. It was written by Australian playwright Michael Noonan when he was living in England. It starred Felicity Young who was married to George Thoms.

== Plot ==
Three doctors, Joe, Ruth and Tom, have just graduated are driving through London when they run over a pedestrian. The doctors panic and decide not to stop. Joe wants to confess, but Tom is indifferent and Ruth loves Tom. The pedestrian later dies and a person who witnessed the accident starts to blackmail them.

== Cast ==
- Felicity Young as Ruth
- Edward Brayshaw as Tom
- Jeffrey Hodgson as Joe
- Ken Goodlet
- Michael Duffield
- Don Crosby

== Production ==
William Sterling said "the play s hard hitting with lots of emphasis on suspense... jazzy beat music provides background."

== Reception ==
The Bulletin TV critic, Frank Roberts, referred to a recent request in parliament by Bill Hayden to ensure legislative protection for Australian actors and writers. Roberts said "The lot engaged in The Music Upstairs deserve it, somewhere south of Macquarie Island, pulling sleds. I stood it for 30 minutes, creating some kind of endurance record, and then switched to The Untouchables." This review prompted a letter of criticism from Ted Willis.
