= The Treaty (film) =

- Written by: Brian Phelan
- Directed by: Jonathan Lewis
- Starring: Brendan Gleeson; Ian Bannen; Julian Fellowes; Barry McGovern
- Country of origin: Ireland
- Original language: English

Production
- Producer: Kieran Corrigan
- Cinematography: Breffni Byrne
- Editor: Chris Rodmell
- Running time: 107 minutes

Original release
- Release: 5 December 1991

The Treaty is a 1991 Irish historical television film written by Brian Phelan and directed by Jonathan Lewis.

The film followed the negotiation of the Anglo-Irish Treaty between Michael Collins and the British government in 1921. Originally made for television, it was a RTÉ - Thames Television co-production.

Brendan Gleeson played Michael Collins, Barry McGovern played Éamon de Valera, Bosco Hogan played Erskine Childers, John Warner played George V, Julian Fellowes played Winston Churchill, and Ian Bannen played David Lloyd George.
