= Top Silk =

Play written by David Williamson

- Original language: English
- Written by: David Williamson
- Characters: 5M, 4F

Premiere
- Date: 11 January 1989
- Place: Seymour Centre, Sydney

Top Silk is a play by David Williamson concerning two lawyers. It is not regarded as one of his strongest plays but was very successful commercially.

== Plot ==
A legal aid solicitor and a prominent barrister battle over their individual careers and the future of their teenage son.

== Original cast ==
- Helmut Bakaitis
- Tina Bursill
- John Clayton
- John Howard
- Simon Kay
- Barbara Lowing
- Vince Martin
- Geoff Morrell
- Leo Wockner

== Reception ==
The play was better received in Melbourne than Sydney.

Despite relatively poor reviews, including a negative critic from HG Kippax of the Sydney Morning Herald, the 1989 production still earned over $2 million.
