= Kenneth Goodlet =

Australian actor (1921–2006)

Ken Goodlet
- Born: Kenneth Edwin Goodlet; 11 October 1921; Perth, Western Australia
- Died: 15 July 2006 (aged 84); Sydney, Australia
- Occupation: Actor
- Years active: 1957-2001-

Kenneth Edwin Goodlet (11 October 1921– 15 July 2006) was an Australian actor with extensive credits in film, radio, TV and theatre, known for Ned Kelly, Bluey (1976) and The Long Arm (1970).

== Filmography (select credits) ==
- One Morning Near Troodos (1958)
- Till Death Do Us Part (1959)
- A Dead Secret (1959) as Frederick Dyson
- Antony and Cleopatra (1959) as Enobarus
- Black Limelight (1959)
- Ned Kelly (1959) as Ned Kelly
- The Square Ring (1960) as Sailor Johnson
- The Slaughter of St Teresa's Day (1960)
- Macbeth (1960) as Macbeth
- Long Distance (1961) as Warden
- Quiet Night (1961)
- The Big Deal (1961) as Julian Ring
- Call Me a Liar (1961) as Mr Pheeming
- The Hobby Horse (1962)
- The Patriots (1962)
- The Criminals (1962) as Dorell
- The Music Upstairs (1962)
- The Coastwatchers (1962) as Don Marshall
- Light Me a Lucifer (1962) as Harry Harmon
- Calamity the Cow (1967) as Lefty
- The Long Arm (1970)
- Number 96 (TV series) (1972) as Mr Holloway
- Scobie Malone (1975) as the Premier
- Bluey (1976) as Assistant Commissioner
- The Tichborne Affair (1977)
- Burke & Wills (1985) as Dr. John Macadam
