= Shirley Thompson vs. the Aliens =

- Directed by: Jim Sharman
- Written by: Jim Sharman; Helmut Bakaitis
- Produced by: Matt Carroll; Jim Sharman
- Starring: Jane Harders; Helmut Bakaitis
- Cinematography: David Sanderson
- Edited by: Malcolm Smith
- Music by: Ralph Tyrell
- Production company: Kolossal Piktures
- Release date: 6 June 1972
- Running time: 104 minutes (original cut); 79 minutes (1976 re-edit)
- Country: Australia
- Language: English
- Budget: A$50,000 or $17,000

Shirley Thompson vs. the Aliens is a 1972 Australian film directed by Jim Sharman and starring Jane Harders and Helmut Bakaitis. It is the first feature-length film from Sharman, who subsequently directed The Rocky Horror Picture Show (1975).

== Plot ==
In 1950s Sydney, Shirley and her gang discover that aliens have attacked Australia but no one believes them. Shirley is assumed to be insane and is committed to a lunatic asylum.

== Cast ==
- Jane Harders as Shirley Thompson
- June Collis as Dr Leslie Smith
- Tim Elliot as Dr George Talbot
- Marion Johns as Rita Thompson
- John Llewellyn as Reg Thompson
- Marie Nicholas as Narelle Thompson
- Helmut Bakaitis as Harold
- John Ivkovitch as Bruce
- Bruce Gould as Blake
- Kate Fitzpatrick as nurse
- Alexander Hay as Alien
- Ron Haddrick as replica of Prince Philip
- Phil Kitamura as gang member
- Candy Raymond as gang member
- Julie Rodgers as gang member
- Georgina West as gang member
- Max Hess as gang member
- Sue Moir as gang member

== Production ==
The film was shot on 16mm. Sharman paid for the movie with his own money. It was written as a tribute to old B movies.

Sharman later said "it was made quite impulsively and not without passion".

Sharman subsequently worked again with both Jane Harders and Kate Fitzpatrick when he directed the original 1973 Sydney stage production of The Rocky Horror Show, which starred Harders as Janet, with Fitzpatrick as Magenta. Cast member Helmut Bakaitis went on to international notoriety for his role as "The Architect" in The Matrix Reloaded and The Matrix Revolutions. The film marks the first screen credit for Sharman's longtime collaborator, designer Brian Thomson, who worked with Sharman on many notable theatre and stage musical productions, including the original Sydney stage productions of Jesus Christ Superstar and The Rocky Horror Show, and Sharman's later films The Rocky Horror Picture Show and Shock Treatment. It was also the first feature film credit for distinguished producer Matt Carroll – a friend of Sharman and Thomson from their student days at the University of New South Wales – who went on to produce many notable Australian feature films and TV series including Sunday Too Far Away, Breaker Morant, the TV miniseries True Believers, Turtle Beach, the acclaimed TV medical drama series G.P., and the science fiction TV series Farscape.

== Release ==
The film was previewed at the National Film Theatre in London in March 1972 and had its premiere at the Sydney Film Festival in June and received limited release. In 1976 Sharman re-edited it substantially, cutting some 25 minutes of footage from the original 1972 version, which ran 104 minutes.
