= Jim Sharman =

Australian theatre director

Jim Sharman AO
- Born: James David Sharman; 12 March 1945 (age 81); Sydney, New South Wales, Australia
- Occupations: Film/stage director; screenwriter; producer; playwright
- Father: James Michael "Jimmy" Sharman Jr.
- Relatives: Jimmy Sharman (grandfather)

James David Sharman (born 12 March 1945) is an Australian director and writer for film and stage with more than 70 productions to his credit. He is renowned in Australia for his work as a theatre director since the 1960s, and is best known internationally as the director of the 1973 theatrical hit The Rocky Horror Show, its film adaptation The Rocky Horror Picture Show (1975) and the film's follow-up, Shock Treatment (1981).

== Biography ==
=== Early life ===
Sharman was born in Sydney, the son of boxing tent impresario and rugby league player James Michael "Jimmy" Sharman Jr. (1912–2006) and Christina McAndleish Sharman (née Mirchell; 1914–2003). He was educated in Sydney, though his upbringing included time spent on Australian showgrounds, where his father ran a travelling sideshow of popular legend, founded by his own father, called "Jimmy Sharman's Boxing Troupe". This brought him into contact with the world of circus and travelling vaudeville. Developing an interest in theatre, he graduated from the production course at the National Institute of Dramatic Art (NIDA) in Sydney in 1966.

=== Career ===
Sharman created a series of productions of experimental theatre, many for the Old Tote Theatre Company, culminating in a controversial staging of Mozart's Don Giovanni for Opera Australia when he was 21 years old. Over the following decade, he directed three rock musicals: Hair in 1969 (Sydney, Melbourne, Tokyo, Boston) (he also designed the original Sydney production); Jesus Christ Superstar in 1972 (Australia and Palace Theatre, London) and created the original production of The Rocky Horror Show with Richard O'Brien in 1973 (Royal Court Theatre, London – subsequently in Sydney, Los Angeles, Melbourne, New York City).

He co-wrote the screenplay and directed the international cult hit film The Rocky Horror Picture Show (1975) for Twentieth Century Fox and directed its loosely based sequel, Shock Treatment, in 1981. In 1985, he directed third year students at (NIDA) in a production of A Dream Play.

In the following decades, Sharman directed a series of new works and Australian premieres, including a series of productions of plays by Patrick White in the late 1970s – The Season at Sarsaparilla, Big Toys, Netherwood and A Cheery Soul – which are credited with reviving the Nobel Laureate's career as a dramatist.

He also directed the film The Night the Prowler, from a screenplay adapted by White from one of his short stories, and notable as White's only produced film screenplay. One of Sharman's most frequent creative collaborators was production designer Brian Thomson, a partnership that began at the Old Tote and continued through their ground-breaking and widely praised stage productions, the rock musicals Hair, Jesus Christ Superstar and The Rocky Horror Show, and the films Shirley Thompson vs. the Aliens, The Rocky Horror Picture Show and Shock Treatment.

Sharman was artistic director of the Adelaide Festival of Arts in 1982 and, while in South Australia, he created Lighthouse, a theatre company which specialised in radical stagings of classics and premieres of new work by major Australian dramatists, including Louis Nowra, Stephen Sewell and Patrick White. The ensemble included many major Australian artists, including actors Geoffrey Rush, Gillian Jones, John Wood and Kerry Walker and associate director Neil Armfield, who would further develop this adventurous tradition at Sydney's Belvoir Street Theatre.

Continuing as a freelance director, Sharman directed Stephen Sewell's Three Furies – scenes from the life of Francis Bacon, for which he won a Helpmann Award for Best Direction of a Play. It played at the 2005 Sydney and Auckland festivals and the 2006 Perth and Adelaide festivals. In 2006, he revived his landmark staging of Benjamin Britten's Death in Venice for Opera Australia. In 2009, he directed a new production of Mozart's Così fan tutte for Opera Australia, a collaboration with the then Berlin-based Australian conductor Simon Hewett.

In August 2008, Sharman's memoirs Blood and Tinsel were published by Melbourne University Publishing in which he talks about his childhood on the road with Jimmy Sharman's Boxing Troupe and also speaks out for the first time about The Rocky Horror Picture Show and his many productions.

Sharman is a resident of Egerton Crescent, Kensington, London.

=== Honours ===
He was appointed an Officer of the Order of Australia in the 2025 King's Birthday Honours for "distinguished service to the performing arts as a writer and director".

== Select credits ==
=== Theatre ===
- Still Life (1964) – Old Tote Theatre
- The Sport of My Mad Mother (1964) - Old Tote Theatre
- Inadmissible Evidence (1964) – Old Tote Theatre
- Entertaining Mr Sloane (1965) – Old Tote Theatre
- The Lover (1966) – AMP Theatrette, Sydney
- The Gents (1966) – AMP Theatrette, Sydney
- Operatic Concerto (1966) – NSW
- Chips With Everything (1966) – Independent Theatre
- A Taste of Honey (1967)
- And So To Bed (1967) - Playhouse Theatre
- Don Giovanni (1967) – national tour
- The Flower Children, A Little Bourke Street Discotheque (1967) – Melbourne
- The Birthday Party (1967) – St Martins Theatre, VIC
- You Never Can Tell (1968) – Old Tote Theatre
- Terror Australis (1968) – Jane Street Theatre
- Norm and Ahmed (1968) – Old Tote Theatre
- Hair (1969) – The Metro Theatre – later national tour (1971–73) and productions in New Zealand (1972), Tokyo, Boston
- As You Like It (1971) – Parade Theatre
- King Lear (1971) – Russell Street Theatre
- Lasseter (1971) – Parade Theatre
- Jesus Christ Superstar (1972–73) – Australian tour – also did productions in London (1972)
- The Unseen Hand by Sam Shepard – London
- The Removalists (1973) – Royal Court Theatre, London
- The Threepenny Opera (1973) – Drama Theatre
- The Rocky Horror Show (1973) – London – also directed productions in LA, Sydney (1974), Melbourne (1975)
- The Season at Sarsaparilla (1975) – Drama Theatre
- Big Toys (1977) – Parade Theatre
- Pandora's Cross (1978) – Paris Theatre
- A Cheery Soul (1979)
- Death in Venice (1980) – Festival Theatre
- Lulu (1981) – Sydney & Adelaide
- A Midsummer Night's Dream (1982) – The Playhouse
- Silver Lining (1982) – The Lighthouse, Adelaide
- Royal Show (1982) – The Playhouse
- Blood Wedding (1983) – The Lighthouse, Adelaide
- Netherwood (1983) – The Playhouse
- Pal Joey (1983) – The Lighthouse, Adelaide
- Sunrise (1983) – The Playhouse
- Dreamplay (1985) – Parade Theatre
- Voss (1986–87) – Australian tour
- Blood Relations – Drama Theatre
- A Lie of the Mind (1987) – Belvoir Street Theatre
- Blood Relations (1987) – The Playhouse
- The Screens (1988) – NIDA Theatre
- The Rake's Progress (1988) – Opera Theatre
- The Conquest of the South Pole (1989) – Belvoir Street Theatre
- Death in Venice (1989) – Opera Theatre
- Chess (1990) – Theatre Royal
- Voss (1990) – Opera Theatre
- Death in Venice (1991) – State Theatre
- Shadow and Splendour (1992) – national tour
- The Wedding Song (1994) – Parade Theatre
- Miss Julie (1995) – The Playhouse
- The Tempest (1997) – Australian national tour
- Berlin to Broadway with Kurt Weill (2000 - NIDA Studio
- Language of the Gods (2001) – NIDA Theatre
- What the Butler Saw (2004) – Belvoir Street Theatre
- Death in Venice (2005) – Opera Theatre
- Three Furies: Scenes from the Life of Francis Bacon (2006) – Playhouse Theatre
- Mozart's Così fan tutte (2009) - Opera Theatre

=== Films ===
- Arcade (1970) – 5-minute short
- Roll up (1971) – unfinished documentary
- Shirley Thompson vs. the Aliens (1972)
- The Rocky Horror Picture Show (1975)
- Summer of Secrets (1976)
- The Night the Prowler (1978)
- Shock Treatment (1981)

== Awards and nominations ==
=== Helpmann Awards ===
The Helpmann Awards is an awards show, celebrating live entertainment and performing arts in Australia, presented by industry group Live Performance Australia (LPA) since 2001. In 2018, Sharman received the JC Williamson Award, the LPA's highest honour, for their life's work in live performance.

| Year | Nominee / work | Award | Result |
|---|---|---|---|
| 2005 | Three Furies | Best Direction of a Play | Won |
| 2018 | Himself | JC Williamson Award | awarded |
