= Black Limelight (1959 film) =

- Directed by: William Sterling
- Starring: Patricia Kennedy
- Country of origin: Australia
- Original language: English

Production
- Running time: 75 mins or 90 mins

Original release
- Network: ABC
- Release: 15 July 1959 (Melbourne)

Black Limelight is a 1959 Australian TV play. It was shot in ABC's Melbourne studios. It was made at a time when Australian drama production was rare.

== Premise ==
A married man, Peter, is suspected of murdering his mistress. His wife Mary fights to clear his name. She discovers his lawyer friend is the killer.

== Cast ==
- Patricia Kennedy as Mary
- Bruce Beeby as Peter
- Diana Bell
- Moira Carleton
- Frank Gatliff as lawyer friend
- Kenneth Goodlet
- Laurie Lange
- Joy Mitchell
- Beverley Phillips as the girlfriend
- Nevil Thurgood

== Production ==
A bathing scene was shot at Canadian Bay. It also included scenes shot in North Balwyn.

Patricia Kennedy had a five-minute monologue which was reportedly to be the longest speech up to that moment on Melbourne TV drama.

== Reception ==
The TV critic from The Sydney Morning Herald thought that "Patricia Kennedy's remarkable dramatic strength in the big leading role did much to minimise the gimmicky construction of thriller plot and some lack of incisive editing" and that "William Sterling's production was, in most places, worthy of the material."

The critic from The Age said "there wasn't a great deal to enthuse about... Channel 2 can and will do more significant dramas."
