= The Soldier's Tale (film) =

1959 film

The Soldier's Tale is a 1959 Australian television ballet starring Robert Helpmann. It aired 4 March 1959 in Melbourne and 15 March 1959 in Sydney.

Helpmann had performed the play on stage a number of times. He reconfigured it for television. Helpmann appeared with Edward Brayshaw - the two men knew each other from touring with Nude with Violin.

He later filmed it for British TV in 1964.

The production was one of several collaborations between Sterling and Robert Helpmann.

== Cast ==
- Heather MacRae
- Robert Helpmann
- Edward Brayshaw

== See also ==
- List of live television plays broadcast on Australian Broadcasting Corporation (1950s)
