= Robert Helpmann =

Australian actor, choreographer, dancer and theatre director (1909–1986)

Sir Robert Helpmann CBE
- Helpmann as the Child Catcher in the 1968 feature film Chitty Chitty Bang Bang
- Born: Robert Murray Helpman; 9 April 1909; Mount Gambier, South Australia, Australia
- Died: 28 September 1986 (aged 77); Sydney, New South Wales, Australia
- Occupations: Ballet dancer; actor; theatre director; choreographer
- Years active: 1927−1986

Sir Robert Murray Helpmann (né Helpman; 9 April 1909 – 28 September 1986) was an Australian ballet dancer, actor, choreographer, and director. After early work in Australia, he moved to Britain in 1932, where he joined the Vic-Wells Ballet (now The Royal Ballet) under its creator, Ninette de Valois. He became one of the company's leading men, partnering Alicia Markova and later Margot Fonteyn. When Frederick Ashton, the company's chief choreographer, was called up for military service in the Second World War, Helpmann took over from him while continuing as a principal dancer.

From the outset of his career, Helpmann was an actor as well as a dancer, and in the 1940s he turned increasingly to acting in plays, at the Old Vic and in the West End. Most of his roles were in Shakespeare plays, but he also appeared in works by Shaw, Coward, Sartre and others. As a director, his range was wide, from Shakespeare to opera, musicals and pantomime.

In 1965, Helpmann became co-director of the Australian Ballet, for whom he created several new ballets. He became sole director in 1975, but disagreements with the company's board led to his dismissal a year later. He directed for Australian Opera and acted in stage plays into the 1980s. Although primarily a stage artist, he appeared in fifteen films between 1942 (One of Our Aircraft is Missing) and 1984 (Second Time Lucky), including The Red Shoes, The Tales of Hoffmann, as the Devil in a film version of Igor Stravinsky's ballet-drama The Soldier's Tale (L'Histoire du soldat) and as the Child Catcher in Chitty Chitty Bang Bang.

Helpmann died in Sydney in 1986, and was given a state funeral in St Andrew's Cathedral. The prime minister, Bob Hawke, gave a tribute in the Parliament of Australia, and a motion of condolence was passed – a rare tribute for a non-politician. Helpmann is commemorated in the Helpmann Awards for Australian performing arts, established in his honour in 2001.

== Life and career ==
=== Early years ===
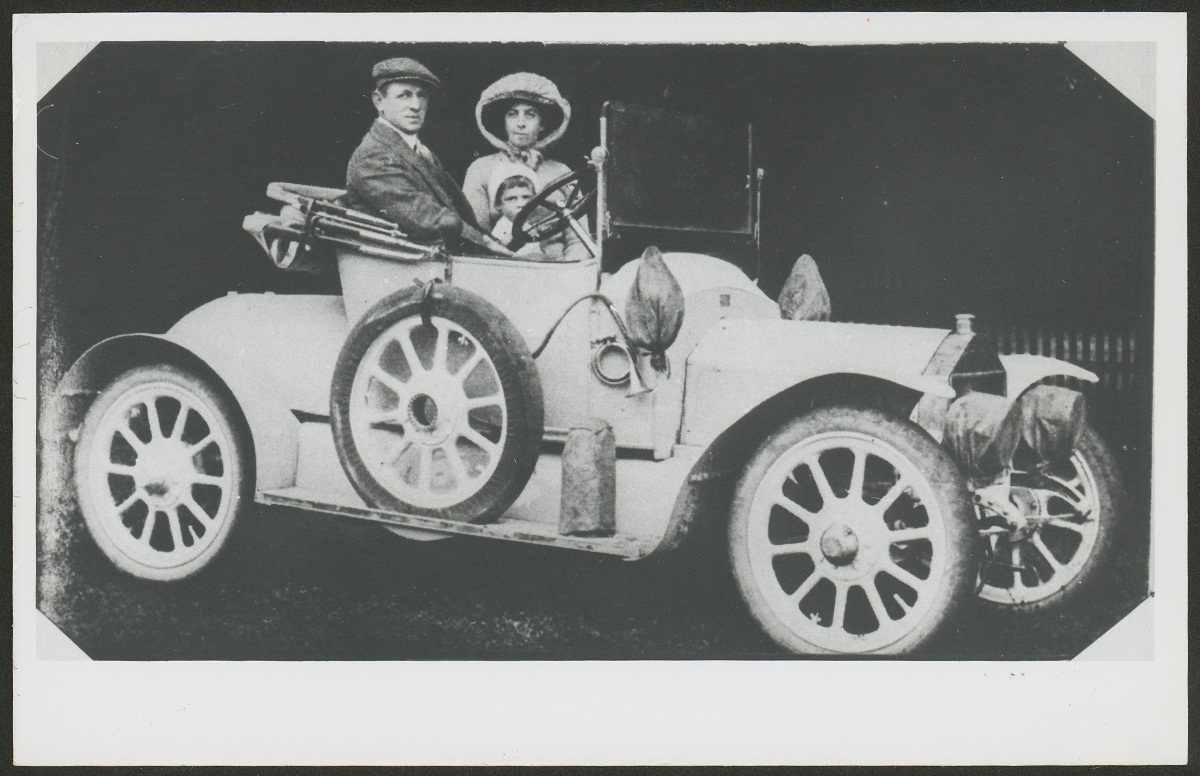
Helpmann and his parents in 1911

Helpmann was born in Mount Gambier, South Australia, the eldest of the three children of James Murray Helpman (1881–1927), a stock and station agent and auctioneer, and his wife, Mary, née Gardiner (1883–1970). Mary Helpman had a passion for the theatre, and her enthusiasm was passed on to all three of her children. Helpmann's younger brother Max (1914–1987) and their sister Sheila (1916–1994) both made their own careers on stage, television and screen.

After being what his biographer Kathrine Sorley Walker calls "an uninterested and recalcitrant scholar" at Prince Alfred College, Adelaide, Helpmann was taken on as a student apprentice by Anna Pavlova when she was on tour in Australia in 1926. He was trained by Alexis Dolinoff, her leading male dancer. He then joined the theatrical producers J. C. Williamson Ltd, as principal dancer for musicals, revues, and pantomimes, beginning with Franz Lehár's Frasquita in 1927. He later appeared in Katinka, The Merry Widow, The New Moon, Queen High, This Year of Grace and Tip-Toes, appearing with stars such as Gladys Moncrieff, Marie Burke and Maisie Gay. Sorley Walker writes, "His vitality and bravura presentation of dances stopped various shows".

Robert Helpmann cited Melbourne eccentric, beautician, radio broadcaster, actor and dancer Stephanie Deste as one of the influences over his dancing and acting career.

=== Vic-Wells Ballet ===
The English actress Margaret Rawlings, who was touring Australia, was impressed by Helpmann. She encouraged him to pursue a career in Britain, and provided him with an introduction to Ninette de Valois, director of the Vic-Wells Ballet (later named the Sadler's Wells Ballet). Helpmann left Australia in 1932, and did not return until 1955. De Valois accepted him into her company. He impressed her – she later wrote "Everything about him proclaims the artist born" – although she noted not only his strengths but also his weaknesses: "talented, enthusiastic, extremely intelligent, great facility, witty, cute as a monkey, quick as a squirrel, a sense of theatre and his own possible achievements therein" but "academically technically weak, lacking in concentration, too fond of a good time and too busy having it". In the mid-1930s, probably at Rawlings's suggestion, he added a second "n" to his surname, to give it a more foreign and exotic air. (Note: Alternative explanations for the change of spelling are that Pavlova suggested it, and that a numerologist told him that fourteen letters would be luckier for him than thirteen. Helpmann's brother and sister followed him in adding the extra letter. For a time both spellings of his surname were current. The longer form is recorded in the press as early as March 1933; The Times, The Tatler and The Era were among the publications intermittently using the shorter version as late as 1936.)

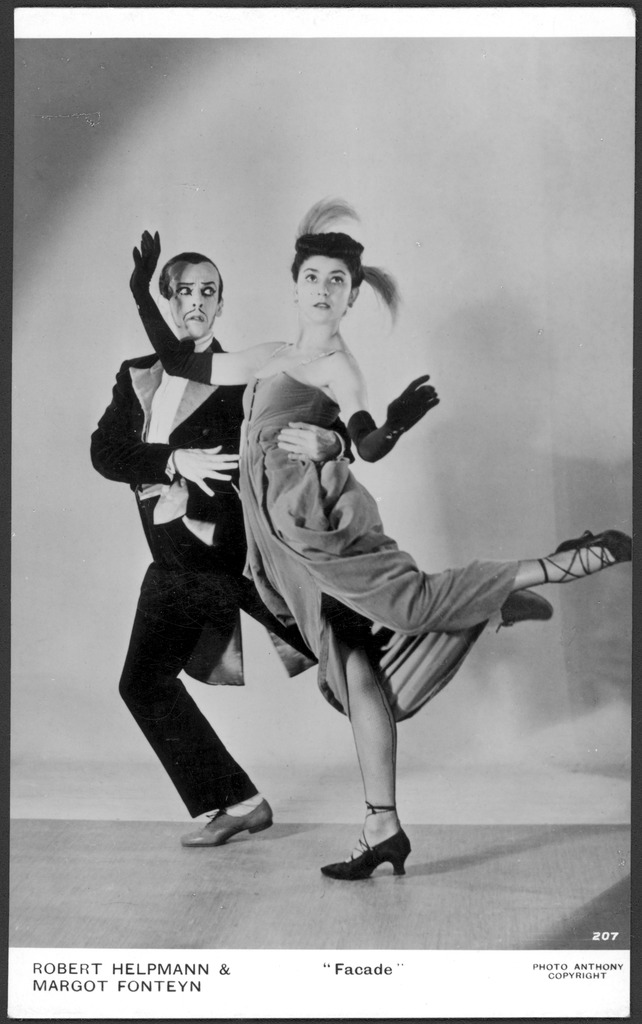
Helpmann and Margot Fonteyn in Frederick Ashton's Façade

In April 1934 de Valois created a new ballet, The Haunted Ballroom, with Helpmann and Alicia Markova in the leading roles. The Times commented that of the soloists Helpmann "had the greatest opportunities, and made fine use of them". He co-starred with Markova in Swan Lake, danced in operas, and appeared at the Open Air Theatre, Regent's Park. In 1935 he was leading dancer in the revue Stop Press, with music by Irving Berlin. At Sadler's Wells he danced the principal role in another new de Valois ballet, The Rake's Progress, and in 1936 Frederick Ashton choreographed a highly romantic ballet, Apparitions, to music by Liszt, featuring Helpmann and the teenaged Margot Fonteyn. Sorley Walker writes that he and Fonteyn were a "perfectly matched partnership", exemplified by "their superb rendering of the Aurora pas de deux in The Sleeping Beauty". As well as romantic leading roles, Helpmann became known for his gift for comedy. Sorley Walker singles out his roles in Coppélia, Ashton's A Wedding Bouquet and de Valois's The Prospect Before Us. Character roles included the doddery Red King in de Valois' Checkmate, which he first danced at the age of 28 and last danced in 1986 when he was 77.

Helpmann's non-ballet work in the later 1930s included his Oberon in Tyrone Guthrie's production of A Midsummer Night's Dream at the Old Vic, which also starred Vivien Leigh as Titania and Ralph Richardson as Bottom. The drama critic of The Times wrote:

It will be useless in future for Mr. Robert Helpmann to pretend that he is exclusively a dancer of the first rank. Certainly his dancing gives strength to his Oberon; he glides into imagined invisibility; but that is not all: his verse sings with his thought, his Oberon flashes with power, and presides, as Oberons do rarely, over the whole magic of the wood.

The doyen of London critics, James Agate, pronounced Helpmann's Oberon to be, in its way, "the best I have ever seen or ever shall see".

=== 1940s ===
Helpmann was part of the Sadler's Wells Ballet touring party who were stranded in the Netherlands when the Germans invaded in May 1940. Helpmann and the company were on the last British boat to be evacuated as the Dutch surrendered. The true story of his escape from Holland during the German invasion is told in the book 'Escape From Holland' by Chris Hunt. During the Second World War Sadler's Wells Ballet became a prominent contributor to public morale, giving London seasons interspersed with a demanding programme of provincial tours. Helpmann's workload often required him to dance leads in three performances in one day, and when Ashton was called up for active service in 1941, Helpmann took on the additional role of choreographer to the company. (Note: As an Australian, Helpmann was not liable for call-up.) Ashton, in his enforced absence from the company, observed Helpmann's rise to pre-eminence with feelings of envy, and their relationship became edgy on Ashton's part. The ballets that Helpmann created for the wartime company were Comus (1942, based on Milton), The Birds (1942, to Respighi's Gli uccelli), Miracle in the Gorbals (1944, a story of redemption with a plot by Benthall and music by Arthur Bliss), and a version of Hamlet set to Tchaikovsky's music. While on leave from the RAF in 1943, Ashton created a new ballet for Helpmann, The Quest, a patriotic tale of Saint George, with music by William Walton, who commented that Helpmann in the lead "looked more like the Dragon than St George." The music has survived but the ballet has not.

I realised I must keep going so that when the moment came that I should leave the ballet altogether, it wouldn't be such a shock to people, that they shouldn't say, "Oh, just a dancer who's got too old".

— Helpmann on acting in Shakespeare.

Helpmann returned to Hamlet in 1944 in the title role of the original play, with the Old Vic company. After the laudatory reviews for his Oberon, those for his Hamlet were more mixed. Ivor Brown thought it "eager, intelligent and exciting", Agate called Helpmann's prince "most heart-breaking" and the young Peter Brook found Helpmann's fast-paced performance highly exciting, but other critics thought it a lightweight interpretation, and opinions varied about the quality of Helpmann's verse-speaking. During the war Helpmann played his first film roles: the supercilious traitor De Jong in One of Our Aircraft is Missing (1942) and the comically fussy Bishop of Ely in Laurence Olivier's Henry V (1944).

At the end of the war David Webster was appointed chief executive of the Royal Opera House, tasked with reopening it for opera and ballet after its wartime closure. He invited de Valois and her company to base themselves there to complement the new opera company he was setting up. In due course the companies became The Royal Ballet and The Royal Opera. Helpmann and Fonteyn led the ballet company in the opening gala performance of The Sleeping Beauty. The first new work staged at the reopened house was Adam Zero (1946), with a libretto by Benthall and music by Bliss, choreographed by and starring Helpmann as an Everyman figure. The work was well received and was revived the following year, but has not held a place in the repertoire.

In 1947, together with Benthall, Helpmann took over the artistic direction of the Duchess Theatre in the West End of London. They presented a revival of John Webster's tragedy The White Devil with Helpmann as the villainous Flamineo and Rawlings as his equally villainous sister. This was well received but their next production, a revival of Leonid Andreyev's He Who Gets Slapped, quickly folded. In the same year Helpmann worked on the film The Red Shoes, which he and Leonid Massine choreographed and appeared in. Helpmann joined the Shakespeare Memorial Theatre Company at Stratford-upon-Avon for the 1948 season, playing the title role in King John, Shylock in The Merchant of Venice and alternating with Paul Scofield in a new production of Hamlet.

=== 1950s ===
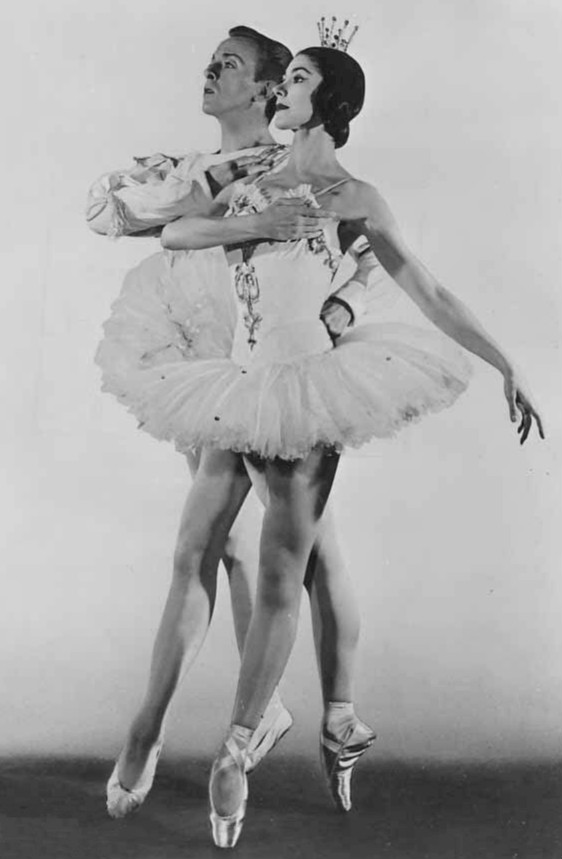
Helpmann and Fonteyn in The Sleeping Beauty, 1953

In 1950 Helpmann directed an opera for the first time – the Covent Garden production of Madama Butterfly, with Elisabeth Schwarzkopf in the title role. The production outlasted its director: after many revivals its final performances at the Royal Opera House were in 1993. The following year he joined Olivier and Vivien Leigh at the St James's Theatre, where they presented Shakespeare's Antony and Cleopatra and Shaw's Caesar and Cleopatra. Helpmann played Octavius Caesar in the first and Apollodorus in the second. When the productions were taken to Broadway at the end of the year he played the same roles. He appeared in another Shaw play the following year, as the male lead, the Doctor, opposite Katharine Hepburn as Epifania, in The Millionairess. Between these plays Helpmann acted in the Powell and Pressburger film The Tales of Hoffmann, conducted by Sir Thomas Beecham and choreographed by Ashton. Helpmann played all four of the villains in the various stories within the opera, his singing voice dubbed by the Welsh bass Bruce Dargavel.

In 1953 Helpmann returned to the Old Vic, directing a new production of Murder in the Cathedral with Robert Donat as Becket. On Coronation night in June 1953 Helpmann returned to Covent Garden as a guest artist to dance Prince Siegfried in Swan Lake. The following year he again directed and choreographed an opera there, The Golden Cockerel, with a cast including Mattiwilda Dobbs, Hugues Cuénod and Geraint Evans. The following year brought two contrasting directing engagements: the first was The Tempest at the Old Vic, with Michael Hordern as Prospero, Richard Burton as Caliban and Claire Bloom as Miranda. Then followed Noël Coward's musical After the Ball, based on Oscar Wilde's Lady Windermere's Fan. Helpmann discovered that the combination of Coward and Wilde was not a success: "Everything that Noël sent up, Wilde was sentimental about, and everything that Wilde sent up Noël was sentimental about. It was two different points of view and it didn't work."

In May 1955 Helpmann returned to Australia, leading a tour of the country by the Old Vic company, with Hepburn as a guest artist. He played Petruchio in The Taming of the Shrew, Angelo in Measure for Measure and Shylock. At the Old Vic in 1956 he directed John Neville and Claire Bloom in Romeo and Juliet, a production later given on Broadway. He joined the company as an actor later in the year, playing Shylock, Launce in The Two Gentlemen of Verona, Saturnius in Titus Andronicus and the title role in Richard III.

During 1957 Helpmann played the title role in Jean-Paul Sartre's Nekrassov, and then took over the lead part of Sebastien in Coward's comedy Nude with Violin in London. The role had been created by John Gielgud, who had been succeeded, not altogether satisfactorily, by Michael Wilding. Helpmann's vitality revived the spirits of the company, and the play continued its run into the following year. Helpmann toured Australia in the piece in 1958–59, after he had returned to ballet for a season at Covent Garden in The Rake's Progress, Hamlet, Coppélia, Miracle in the Gorbals and Petrushka. His performance in the last of these was not well received: in the role of a lovelorn puppet, he was seen as too overtly human and intelligent.

=== 1960s ===
At the start of the 1960s Helpmann worked mostly in non-ballet theatre, forgoing the opportunity to create the role of the Widow Simone in Ashton's La fille mal gardée in favour of directing Vivien Leigh and Mary Ure in Jean Giraudoux's play Duel of Angels on Broadway. In 1962 he performed again for Australian audiences in another Old Vic company, this time headed by Vivien Leigh, which appeared in the Far East, South America and Australia. In 1963 he choreographed his sixth work for The Royal Ballet, the short-lived and critically damned Elektra, with music by Malcolm Arnold and featuring Nadia Nerina, David Blair, Monica Mason and Derek Rencher. He also supervised a new production of Swan Lake for the company, with important new choreographic contributions from Ashton. In the same year he played Prince Tuan in the film 55 Days at Peking.

In 1962 Peggy van Praagh, formerly of Sadler's Wells, launched a new company, the Australian Ballet, which, Sorely Walker writes, steadily gained ground as "a company full of lively young Australian talent, helped along by top-level international stars like Erik Bruhn, Rudolf Nureyev, and Sonia Arova." Van Praagh approached Helpmann to create a new work for the company and he suggested a story based around the native Australian lyrebird. He was keen to promote Australian talent, and recruited Sidney Nolan to design the costumes and scenery and Malcolm Williamson to compose the score. The work, titled The Display, was premiered at the Adelaide Festival in March 1964, with Kathleen Gorham in the leading role, to an enthusiastic reception. he appeared in a TV special Half an Hour with Robert Helpmann.

Back in London, Helpmann directed and choreographed the first British production of Lerner and Loewe's musical Camelot in 1964. He had been approached by its authors to play Merlin in the original Broadway production, but nothing came of the suggestion. For the London production he sought to recapture, more than the American production had done, the sprit of The Once and Future King, the book on which the show was based. The musical received tepid reviews, but Helpmann's production, with designs by John Truscott, was praised as a "dazzling" and "gorgeous spectacle"; the show ran for well over a year.

The success of The Display led to Helpmann's appointment as co-director of the Australian Ballet in 1965. His biographer Christopher Sexton comments that Helpmann and van Praag "complemented each other with their different personalities and skills: she the pedagogue, teacher and administrator; he the restless 'jet-setting' star who spent six months of the year overseas and attracted international names to perform with the company". His ballets for the company during the rest of the 1960s were Yugen (1965); an expanded version of Elektra (1966) and Sun Music (1968).

Helpmann made two more films during the 1960s. In 1966, he played Weng in The Quiller Memorandum and in 1968 he played the Child Catcher in Chitty Chitty Bang Bang; on the set of the latter film, he was the opposite of his character, as he loved children and was very kind and caring toward the child actors, often protecting them from the director's temper and profanity. In one notable on-set incident, a carriage that Helpmann was riding as the Child Catcher accidentally overturned, but he was able to swing free and "skip" across the rolling vehicle, saving himself from serious injury; his co-star Dick Van Dyke later recalled that feat as the most graceful thing that he had ever seen. The role remains Helpmann's most well-known and acclaimed performance. One critic observed, "He will eternally frighten children as the demented child catcher"; others called Helpmann's performance "the most sinister presence I have ever seen on film", and "a devastating turn" that would give children nightmares.

In 1968 Helpmann was appointed artistic director designate of the Adelaide Festival of 1970, and spent much time seeking out the performers for it. As well as showcasing Australian talent he aimed to attract internationally prestigious performers.

=== 1970s ===
Under Helpmann's direction the line-up for the 1970 Adelaide Festival was, by common consent, exceptionally impressive. Among those appearing were the Royal Shakespeare Company, led by Judi Dench and Donald Sinden, in The Winter's Tale and Twelfth Night; Benjamin Britten and Peter Pears brought the English Opera Group; there were art exhibitions from Pompeii and Mexico. Dance was represented not only by the Australian Ballet, but also by the Royal Thai Ballet, the Balinese Dance Company and the Georgian State Dance Company. Nureyev was guest artist with the Australian Ballet in a revival of Helpmann's Hamlet, new to the company's repertoire and greatly admired. Nureyev also presented his version of Marius Petipa's classic ballet Don Quixote, dancing the romantic lead, Basilio, with Helpmann in the title role of the deluded knight. This was the first time the two dancers had worked together; they took to each other with enthusiasm and continued their fruitful professional relationship. Nureyev continued to play Helpmann's old role of Hamlet in revivals of the 1942 ballet, and the two starred in a film of Don Quixote with the Australian company in 1973, shown internationally and subsequently published on DVD.

By the 1970s the combination of Helpmann and Ashton in comic drag as the Ugly Sisters in Ashton's Cinderella had become a much-loved institution at Covent Garden in various revivals since its 1948 premiere. In 1972 Helpmann succeeded in getting Ashton to join him for a production by the Australian Ballet, but despite Helpmann's urging, Ashton never created a new work for the company, although he restaged his La fille mal gardée for them.

Helpmann's biographer Elizabeth Salter comments that 1974 was "a year of disaster" for both directors of the Australian Ballet. Van Praag was forced by arthritis to retire, and Michael Benthall, who was Helpmann's longtime partner, died. It was also the year of the last ballet created by Helpmann, the plotless Perisynthyon. He commissioned scores from two Australian composers in succession, but finding neither satisfactory he turned at the last minute to Sibelius's First Symphony. The late changes caused inadequate preparation time for the dancers, and the piece was not well received. The following year disagreements between Helpmann and the board of the Australian Ballet came to a head. He was outspoken about the inadequacy of the company's budget, and refused to cut costs, on the grounds that doing do would be artistically and technically damaging. He made it publicly clear that he felt the board had become "dominated by money-men who had no experience or understanding of artistic matters". The board decided that he must go, and tried to ease him out quietly. He did not cooperate, and made it known that he had been dismissed: "I want the public and the dancers to know that I didn't decide to leave them. I would have stayed with them until I dropped dead."

In 1977 Peter Wright, director of the Sadler's Wells Royal Ballet, invited Helpmann to appear with the company in two of his old starring roles – the Red King in Checkmate and Dr Coppélius in Coppélia. British ballet audiences had seen little of him in leading roles for some years, and his return was greeted with enthusiasm. The ballet critic of The Times described his Coppélius as "a legend come to life", and his Financial Times colleague wrote of Helpmann's "riotous and wonderful control", concluding, "British ballet owes Helpmann a vast debt – his present performances in Coppélia and Checkmate increase it still further".

=== 1980s ===
In 1981 Helpmann staged another revival of his ballet Hamlet, this time featuring Anthony Dowell. The production was given first at Covent Garden and was later taken to New York. In Sydney, Helpmann directed and choreographed Handel's opera Alcina, and in the US he directed Lilli Palmer in a one-woman show about Sarah Bernhardt, Sarah in America.

In New Zealand, Helpmann supervised the 1981 world premiere of the musical Aloha he had co-authored with Hawaiian composer Eaton Magoon Jr, staged by the Hamilton Operatic Society at the Founders Theatre directed by Robert Young, with Derek Williams as orchestrator and musical director. A cast recording produced by Carl Doy was made of the show at Mandrill Studios. In 1983 there was a Hawaiian production of the show, followed in 1985 by a Michael Edgley revival production starring Patricia Morison at His Majesty's Theatre, Auckland, directed by Joe Layton with Derek Williams rehired as musical director. New Zealand-born singer Derek Metzger starred in all Aloha productions.

The following year Helpmann appeared with Diana Rigg in Harvey Schmidt's musical, Colette, which opened in Seattle but folded before reaching Broadway. He then made his last British appearance in an acting role, playing Cardinal Pirelli in a revival of Sandy Wilson's Valmouth at the Chichester Festival. Irving Wardle wrote in The Times, "It is not a large part, but Helpmann's hooded smiles and baleful oeuillades, his capacity to express elegant corruption to his beringed finger-tips, lodge one imperishable image."

In 1983 Helpmann directed Gounod's opera Roméo et Juliette in Sydney, and later in the year appeared there as the elderly Bosie in Justin Fleming's play about Oscar Wilde, The Cobra, with Mark Lee as Bosie's young self. In 1984, together with Googie Withers and John McCallum, he toured in Ted Willis's play Stardust, and joined his sister Sheila to record two episodes of the Australian soap opera A Country Practice, which were shown in 1985. Early in that year he was in the US directing a revival of the operetta The Mery Widow for the San Diego Opera. In June, at the Sydney Opera House, he directed Joan Sutherland in Bellini's I Puritani. His last stage appearances were as the Red King in Checkmate, with the Australian Ballet, in Melbourne and Sydney in May 1986.

== Personal life and death ==
Helpmann was gay. In 1938, while performing at the Old Vic, Helpmann met Michael Benthall, a young actor who would eventually become a theatre director. Helpmann formed a longtime professional and personal relationship with Benthall, and they lived together in London from the 1940s until Benthall's death in 1974.

On 28 September 1986, Helpmann died at Royal North Shore Hospital in Sydney, after a long battle with emphysema. He was 77 years old.

Helpmann was given the rare tribute of a state funeral, held on 2 October at St Andrew's Cathedral, Sydney. Tributes were paid in both Houses of the Parliament of Australia. In the Senate all senators present stood in silence. This was noted as a rarity, and it was put on record that "it is only in exceptional circumstances that motions of condolence are moved for distinguished Australians who have not sat in the Parliament". Senator Stan Collard said:

He always regarded himself as an Australian, although much of his life was spent away from these shores ... His love of the theatre and his ability to use it as a medium of communication and expression knew no bounds. He put this country on the map in the cultural arena.... He was always looking for new challenges and was never content to rely on past successes.... He was one of our great ambassadors.

In the House of Representatives the prime minister, Bob Hawke, said, "No one should underestimate Sir Robert Helpmann's role in the development of the growing maturity of Australia's art and culture. ... He demonstrated to the world the diversity of this nation's talents and capabilities." In London a memorial service was held at St Paul's, Covent Garden (known as "the actors' church"); Ashton represented Princess Margaret, Fonteyn gave the address, a tribute was read from de Valois, and the British ballet and theatre were represented by some of their best-known members.

== Honours, reputation and legacy ==
In 1954 Helpmann was appointed to the Royal Order of the Polar Star (Sweden) and in 1957 he was created a Knight of the Cedar (Lebanon). He was appointed CBE in 1964, named as Australian of the Year for 1965, and was created a Knight Bachelor in 1968.

In The Daily Telegraph, de Valois wrote in an obituary tribute:

To work with Robert Helpmann was always an inspiration. There was at work an alert intelligence with an acute sense of perception. ... Bobby had a sense of humour that surmounted everything. Sometimes it was expressed by word of mouth, sometimes by an outburst of "mime"; at other times by just a look – and the latter could prove to be the most potent of all, for his timing on such occasions was as faultless as it was fatal.

An unsigned obituary in The Times caused upset by calling Helpmann "A homosexual of the proselytising kind, [who] could turn young men on the borderline his way." It was quickly pointed out that Helpmann kept his professional and private lives firmly separate. An assessment in The Guardian ranked him as capable in "princely" roles in classic ballets, but "peerless" in dramatic parts, and best of all in comic roles. The Australian Dictionary of Biography (ADB) describes Helpmann as "the complete man of the theatre", but adds that in some people's view he worked in too many fields to achieve supremacy in any one of them. Malcolm Williamson observed, "he never became a Gielgud, Olivier or Redgrave, or an Ashton, Balanchine or Petit because he was the most pluralistic of the lot"; the ADB quotes the dancer Moira Shearer: "he wasn't a great dancer – he wasn't a great actor – but he was most certainly a great mime, the perfect bridge between the two". The New York Times said of him:

While some critics question whether he would measure up to today's rigid standards for great classical dancers, Sir Robert was a dancer who could act and an actor who could dance. His personality and talent played a vital part in building the fledgling British ballet.

The Helpmann Academy in South Australia was named in his honour; it is a partnership of the major visual and performing arts education and training institutions in South Australia offering award courses for people seeking professional careers in the arts. The Helpmann Awards were instituted 2001, and recognise distinguished artistic achievement and excellence in Australia's live performing arts sectors. The Sir Robert Helpmann Theatre is named after him at his birthplace in Mount Gambier. Onstage, Helpmann has been commemorated in the play LyreBird (Tales of Helpmann), by Tyler Coppin.

== Ballets choreographed by Helpmann ==
- Business a la Russe. Rawlings/Toyne Drama Company, Criterion Theatre, Sydney, April 1932
- Danse, La (with Wendy Toye). Royal Academy of Dancing Production Club, Rudolf Steiner Hall, London, 23 March 1939; Ballet de la Jeunesse Anglais, Cambridge Theatre, London, 9 May 1939
- Comus. Music by Henry Purcell arranged by Constant Lambert, Sadler's Wells Ballet, New Theatre, London, 14 January 1942
- Hamlet. Music by Tchaikovsky (Fantasy Overture), Sadler's Wells Ballet, New Theatre, London, 19 May 1942
- The Birds. Music by Respighi, Sadler's Wells Ballet, New Theatre, London, 24 November 1942
- Miracle in the Gorbals. Music by Arthur Bliss, Sadler's Wells Ballet, Princes Theatre, London, 26 October 1944
- Adam Zero. Music by Bliss, Sadler's Wells Ballet, ROHCG, 10 April 1946 (revised 16 December 1947)
- Elektra. Music by Malcolm Arnold, Royal Ballet, ROHCG, 26 March 1963. Revised version, Australian Ballet, Her Majesty's Theatre, Adelaide, 15 March 1966
- The Display. Music by Malcolm Williamson, Australian Ballet, Her Majesty's Theatre, Adelaide, 14 March 1964
- Yugen. Music by Yuzo Toyama, Australian Ballet, Her Majesty's Theatre, Adelaide, 18 February 1965
- Sun Music. Music by Peter Sculthorpe, Australian Ballet, Her Majesty's Theatre, Sydney, 2 August 1968
- Perisynthyon. Music by Jean Sibelius (Symphony No 1), Australian Ballet, Her Majesty's Theatre, Adelaide, 21 March 1974

== Filmography ==
=== Film ===
Year	Title	Role	Notes
1942	One of Our Aircraft Is Missing	De Jong	Film debut
1944	Henry V	Bishop of Ely	
1946	Caravan	Wycroft	
1948	The Red Shoes	Ivan Boleslawsky	
1948	Steps of the Ballet	Presenter	Short film
1951	The Tales of Hoffmann	Lindorf / Coppelius / Dapertutto / Dr. Miracle	
1956	The Iron Petticoat	Major Ivan Kropotkin	
1956	The Big Money	The Reverend	Not released for two years
1963	55 Days at Peking	Prince Tuan	
1964	The Soldier's Tale	The Devil	
1966	The Quiller Memorandum	Weng	
1968	Chitty Chitty Bang Bang	Child Catcher	
1972	Alice's Adventures in Wonderland	The Mad Hatter	
1973	Don Quixote	Don Quixote	
1973	A Little of Don Quixote....	Don Quixote	Short film
1977	The Mango Tree	Professor	
1978	Patrick	Doctor Roget	
1984	Second Time Lucky	The Devil	Final film

=== Television ===
Year	Title	Role	Notes
1936	Job	Satan	TV movie
1936	Façade	Dancer	TV movie
1937	Les patineurs	White Couple	TV movie
1937	Carnaval	Eusebius	TV movie
1937	Le lac des cygnes	The Prince Siegfried	TV movie
1939	Arlecchino	Arlecchino	TV movie
1939	Checkmate	The Red King	TV movie
1939	The Sleeping Princess	Prince Charming	TV movie
1939	The Rake's Progress	The Rake	TV movie
1953	Lux Video Theatre		Episode: "Two for Tea"
1953	Wednesday Theatre	The Caller	Episode: "Box for One"
1957	Theatre Night	Georges de Vallera	Episode: Nekrassov
1957	Coppélia	Dr Coppélius	1 episode
1958	Box for One		TV movie
1959	The Soldier's Tale	The Devil	TV movie
1959	ITV Play of the Week	Sebastien	Episode: "Nude with Violin"
1959	Ballet Spectacular	Dancer	TV special
1962	The Ghost Sonata	The Old Man	TV movie
1963	Checkmate	The White King	TV movie
1963	An Evening with Robert Helpmann	Self	TV special
1964	The Wednesday Play	Fouche	Episode: "Catch as Catch Can"
1965	The Australian Londoners	Self	TV movie
1966	Robert Helpmann Introduces the Australian Ballet	Presenter	TV special
1968	Contrabandits	Donald Steele	Episode: "In for a Penny"
1969	NET Playhouse	The Devil	TV play: "The Soldier's Tale"
1970	Cinderella	Ugly Stepsister	TV movie
1971	BP Super Show	Don Quixote	TV special
1978	Puzzle	Shepherd	TV movie
1985	A Country Practice	Sir Adrian Dormin	2 episodes
1987	Don Quixote of La Mancha	Don Quixote (voice)	Animated TV movie

== See also ==
- List of dancers

== Notes, references and sources ==
=== Sources ===
==== Books ====
- Anderson, Zoë (2006). The Royal Ballet: 75 years. London: Faber and Faber. ISBN 978-0-571-22795-2.
- Billman, Larry (1996). Film Choreographers and Dance Directors. Jefferson: McFarland. ISBN 978-0-89950-868-9.
- Castle, Charles (1972). Noël. London: W H Allen. ISBN 978-0-491-00534-0.
- De Valois, Ninette (1957). Come Dance With Me: A memoir, 1898–1956. London: Hamish Hamilton. OCLC 558068771.
- Gaye, Freda, ed. (1967). Who's Who in the Theatre (fourteenth ed.). London: Sir Isaac Pitman and Sons. OCLC 5997224.
- Gielgud, John (2004). Richard Mangan (ed.). Gielgud's Letters. London: Weidenfeld and Nicolson. ISBN 978-0-297-82989-8.
- Haltrecht, Montague (1975). The Quiet Showman – Sir David Webster and the Royal Opera House. London: Collins. ISBN 978-0-00-211163-8.
- Howard, Tony (2008). Women as Hamlet: Performance and interpretation in theatre, film and fiction. Cambridge: Cambridge University Press. ISBN 978-0-521-86466-4.
- Mander, Raymond; Mitchenson, Joe; Day, Barry Day; Morley, Sheridan (2000) [1957]. Theatrical Companion to Coward (second ed.). London: Oberon. ISBN 978-1-84002-054-0.
- Mazer, Cory (2013). Poel, Granville Barker, Guthrie, Wanamaker. London and New York: Bloomsbury Arden Shakespeare. ISBN 978-1-4725-3950-2.
- Salter, Elizabeth (1978). Helpmann: The authorised biography of Sir Robert Helpmann, CBE. Brighton: Angus and Robertson. ISBN 978-0-207-95670-6.
- Simpson, Paul (2004). The Rough Guide to Kids' Movies. London and New York: Rough Guides. ISBN 978-1-84353-346-7.
- Sorley Walker, Kathrine (1987). Ninette de Valois: An Idealist Without Illusions. London: Hamish Hamilton. ISBN 978-0-241-12386-7.

==== Journals ====
- Sorley Walker, Kathrine (1998a). "Robert Helpmann, Dancer and Choreographer: Part One". Dance Chronicle. 21 (1): 1–72. doi:10.1080/01472529808569296. JSTOR 1567998. (subscription required)
- Sorley Walker, Kathrine (1998b). "Robert Helpmann, Dancer and Choreographer: Part Two". Dance Chronicle. 21 (2): 229–283. doi:10.1080/01472529808569311. JSTOR 1568039. (subscription required)
- Sorley Walker, Kathrine (1998c). "Robert Helpmann, Dancer and Choreographer: Part Three". Dance Chronicle. 21 (3): 441–480. JSTOR 1568030. (subscription required)

Cultural offices
Preceded by Advisory Board	Director of the Adelaide Festival of Arts; 1970	Succeeded by Louis van Eyssen
