= Greg McNamara =

Australian boxer

Greg McNamara (1950–1997) was an Australian boxer. He was born in Tamworth, New South Wales and was Australian light-heavyweight boxing champion.
