= Calabria (Chamber of Deputies constituency) =

- Chamber of Deputies; Electoral constituency
- Region: Calabria
- Electorate: 1,496,834 (2022)
- Major settlements: Catanzaro, Cosenza, Crotone, Reggio Calabria, Vibo Valentia

Current constituency
- Created: 1993
- Seats: 13
- Members: M5S (3); FI (4); PD (1); Lega (2); FdI (3)

Calabria is one of the 29 constituencies (Italian: circoscrizioni) represented in the Chamber of Deputies, the lower house of the Italian parliament. The constituency currently elects 13 deputies. Its boundaries correspond to those of the Italian region of Calabria. The electoral system uses a parallel voting system, which act as a mixed system, with 3/8 of seats allocated using a first-past-the-post electoral system and 5/8 using a proportional method, with one round of voting.

The constituency was first established by the Mattarella law on 4 August 1993 and later confirmed by the Calderoli law on 21 December 2005 and by the Rosato law on 3 November 2017. The current borders of the districts were created as a result of the 2020 Italian Constitutional Referendum.

== Members of the Parliament ==
=== Legislature XIX (2022–Present) ===
Single-member districts
| District | | | Deputy | Coalition | Party | Ref |
| N. | Name | Map | Deputy | Coalition | Party | Ref |
|---|---|---|---|---|---|---|
| 01 | Corigliano -Rosano | | Domenico Furgiuele | Centre-right | League | |
| 02 | Cosenza | | Andrea Gentile *Formerly Anna Laura Orrico* | Centre-right | Forza Italia | |
| 03 | Catanzaro | | Wanda Ferro | Centre-right | Brothers of Italy | |
| 04 | Vibo Valentia | | Giovanni Arruzzolo | Centre-right | Forza Italia | |
| 05 | Reggio Calabria | | Francesco Cannizzaro | Centre-right | Forza Italia | |

Multi-member districts
| District | | | Deputy | Coalition | Party | Ref |
| N. | Name | Map | Deputy | Coalition | Party | Ref |
|---|---|---|---|---|---|---|
| 01 | Calabria | | Alfredo Antoniozzi | Centre-right | Brothers of Italy | |
| 01 | Calabria | | Vittoria Baldino | Five Star Movement | | |
| 01 | Calabria | | Simona Loizzo | Centre-right | League | |
| 01 | Calabria | | Giuseppe Mangialavori | Centre-right | Forza Italia | |
| 01 | Calabria | | Anna Laura Orrico *Formerly Elisa_Scutellà* | Five Star Movement | | |
| 01 | Calabria | | Eugenia Roccella | Centre-right | Brothers of Italy | |
| 01 | Calabria | | Nico Stumpo | Centre-left | Democratic Party | |
| 01 | Calabria | | Riccardo Tucci | Five Star Movement | | |
| 01 | Calabria | | Elisa Scutellà | Forced to forfeit seat after a recount | | |

=== 2018–2022 ===
Single-member districts
| District | | | Deputy | Coalition | Party |
| N. | Name | Map | Deputy | Coalition | Party |
|---|---|---|---|---|---|
| 01 | Castrovillari | | Carmelo Massimo Misiti | Five Star Movement | |
| 02 | Corigliano Calabro | | Francesco Sapia | Five Star Movement | |
| 03 | Cosenza | | Anna Laura Orrico | Five Star Movement | |
| 04 | Catanzaro | | Giuseppe D'Ippolito | Five Star Movement | |
| 05 | Crotone | | Elisabetta Barbuto | Five Star Movement | |
| 06 | Vibo Valentia | | Wanda Ferro | Centre-right | Brothers of Italy |
| 07 | Gioia Tauro | | Francesco Cannizzaro | Centre-right | Forza Italia |
| 08 | Reggio Calabria | | Federica Dieni | Five Star Movement | |

Multi-member districts
| District | | | Party | Deputy |
| N. | Name | Map | Party | Deputy |
|---|---|---|---|---|
| 01 | Calabria – 01 | | Five Star Movement | Francesco Forciniti |
| 01 | Calabria – 01 | | Five Star Movement | Elisa Scutellà |
| 01 | Calabria – 01 | | Five Star Movement | Alessandro Melicchio |
| 01 | Calabria – 01 | | Forza Italia | Roberto Occhiuto |
| 01 | Calabria – 01 | | Democratic Party | Enza Bruno Bossio |
| 01 | Calabria – 01 | | League | Domenico Furgiuele |
| 02 | Calabria – 02 | | Five Star Movement | Dalila Nesci |
| 02 | Calabria – 02 | | Five Star Movement | Paolo Parentela |
| 02 | Calabria – 02 | | Five Star Movement | Riccardo Tucci |
| 02 | Calabria – 02 | | Forza Italia | Jole Santelli |
| 02 | Calabria – 02 | | Forza Italia | Maria Tripodi |
| 02 | Calabria – 02 | | Democratic Party | Antonio Viscomi |
| 02 | Calabria – 02 | | Free and Equal | Nico Stumpo |
