= 1905 Calabria earthquake =

Extreme earthquake in southern Italy

- USGS ShakeMap

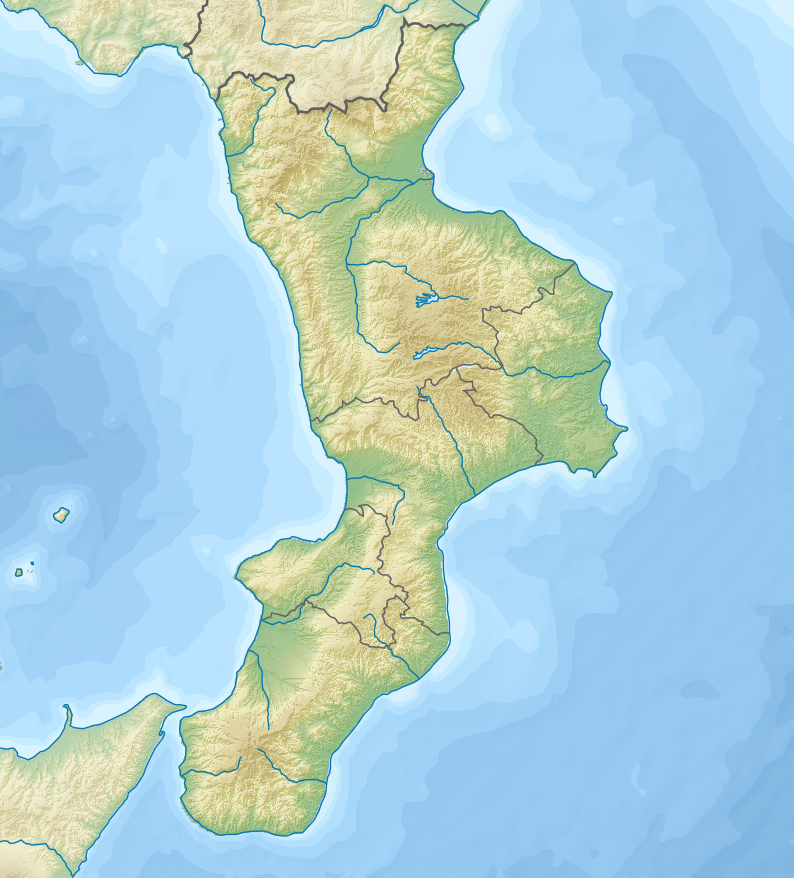
- Location within Calabria
- UTC time: 1905-09-08 01:43:02
- ISC event: 16957871
- USGS-ANSS: ComCat
- Local date: 8 September 1905
- Local time: 02:43
- Magnitude: 7.2 M_{w}
- Depth: 15 km (9 mi)
- Epicenter: 38.64°N 15.78°E
- Total damage: Severe
- Max. intensity: MMI XI (Extreme)
- Tsunami: 1.3 m (4 ft 3 in)
- Casualties: 557–2,500 dead

Striking southern Italy on 8 September, the 1905 Calabria earthquake had a moment magnitude of 7.2 and a maximum Mercalli intensity of XI (Extreme). The first major earthquake of the 20th century, it severely damaged parts of Lipari, Messina Province and a large area between Cosenza and Nicotera and killed between 557 and 2,500 people.

== Tectonic setting ==
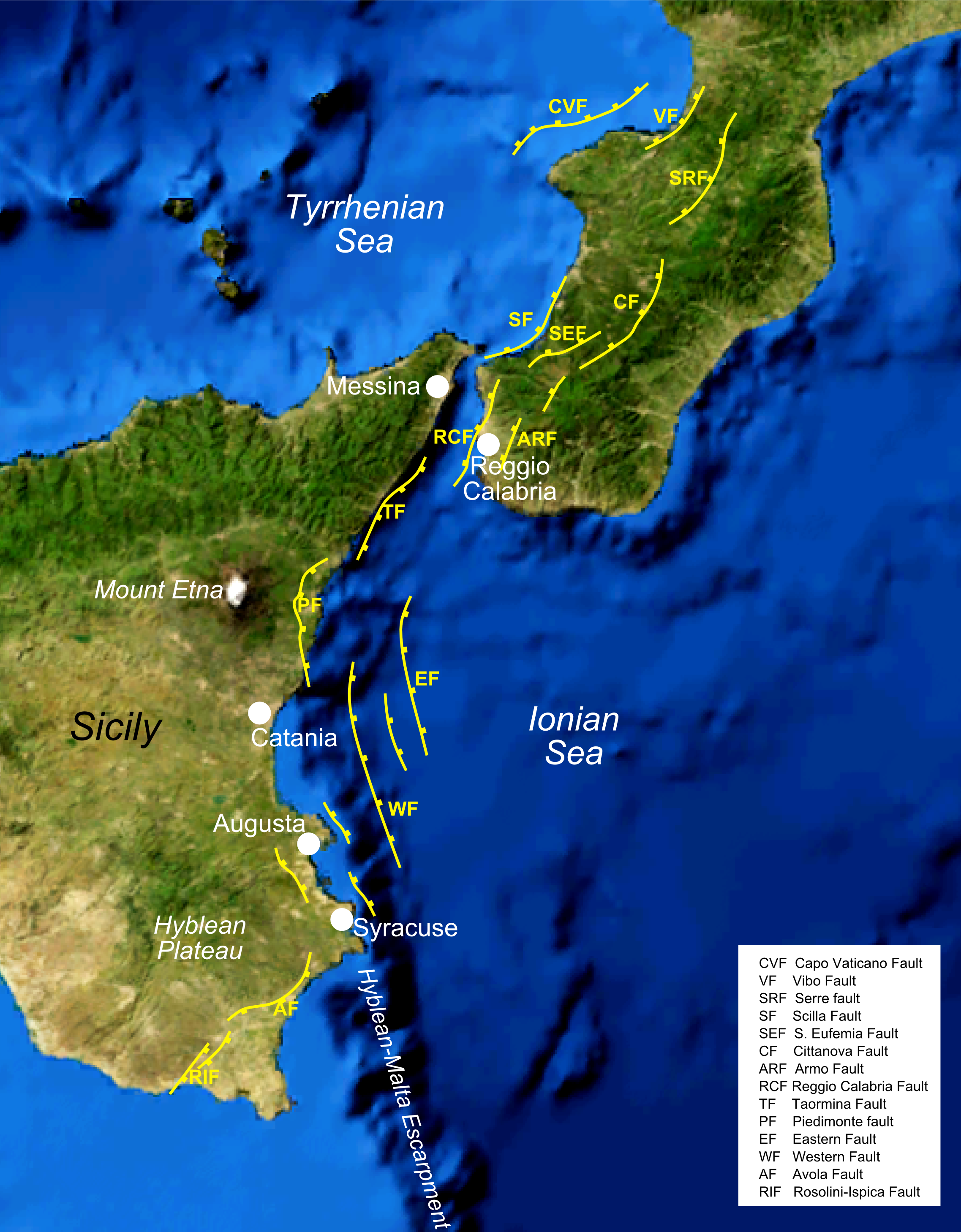
Major faults associated with the Siculo-Calabrian rift

The region of Calabria is located between the Tyrrhenian and Ionian Seas, where active extension is ongoing as a result of slab rollback affecting Tethyan oceanic crust of the African plate as it subducts beneath the Eurasian plate. The initial result of the rollback was the formation of the Tyrrhenian Sea back-arc basin starting in the Miocene, continuing in to the Pleistocene. The location of the extension migrated eastwards overall, progressively affecting areas previously affected by thrusting. Extension is accommodated by normal faults on the Tyrrhenian side in Calabria. Many of the active rift faults border basins containing Pliocene–Pleistocene sedimentary sequences. The trend of normal faults extend southwards to the Strait of Messina, where they occur on the Ionian side in Sicily. Known as the Siculo-Calabrian rift, this active geological feature is characterized by its high seismicity of earthquakes up to M_{w} 7.1. A series of major damaging earthquakes associated with this rift zone began in 1638, with a sequence of four events, followed by those in 1659, 1693, five earthquakes in 1783, 1905 and 1908. Together these earthquakes ruptured almost the entire length of the zone.

== Earthquake ==
The earthquake was felt strongly over a wide area including Basilicata, Irpinia, Salerno and Catania. It was felt as far away as western Albania, Isernia and Palermo. The maximum felt intensity was estimated to be X (Ruinous) on the MCS scale.

The mainshock was preceded by two small foreshocks at 23:00 on 7 September and at 0:40 on 8 September. The mainshock occurred at 01:43 UTC and was followed immediately by two aftershocks. The magnitude of the mainshock has been given a wide range of values, from 6.7 M_{e} (equivalent magnitude from intensity observations by INGV), to 7.41±0.29 M_{w} from instrumental observations. The ISC GEM catalogue gives the event as 7.2 M_{w}, while an estimate from a mapped fault in the Sant'Eufemia Gulf, based on a slip value of 2.3 m, gives 6.9 M_{w}. A recalculation of instrumental recordings using seven stations, rather than the analysis of the records from two stations that gave the higher 7.41 value, gave a magnitude of M_{w} 7.10±0.26, closer to other estimates.

In the three months after the earthquake, there were 100 aftershocks, rising to 219 by the end of 1905. A further 95 aftershocks were recorded in 1906 and another 82 in 1907.

The location of the earthquake's epicenter and the causative fault are also debated. Three main epicentral locations have been proposed, onshore on Capo Vaticano, offshore in the Sant'Eufemia Gulf or west of Capo Vaticano. The main candidate faults include the proposed Capo Vaticano Fault, thought to be part of the main NW-dipping set and trending SW-NE just offshore from the cape. Parallel to this is the Vibo Valentia Fault mapped onshore. Southeast-dipping faults have also been proposed, of which only the Sant'Eufemia Fault has been fully mapped out, based on seismic reflection data. Finally the WNW-ESE trending Coccorino Fautl has been suggested on the southern side of the Capo Vaticano, with a possible parallel offshore fault, the Western Offshore Fault. It has also been suggested that the earthquake was a result of a normal fault rupture within the slab of African plate oceanic crust subducting beneath Calabria, at a depth of 35–55 km.

Several of the proposed models have been tested by modelling of either the observed tsunami effects or seismic intensities or both.

== Tsunami ==
A small tsunami was triggered that affected the shores of the Gulf of Saint Euphemia, particularly to the north. Effects were also observed to the southwest of Capo Vaticano and as far away as Milazzo and along other parts of the coast of Sicily. At Bivona (now a suburb of Vibo Valentia) there was 30 m of inundation and a boat was pushed onshore. At Briatico anchored boats were carried onshore by 7–8 m, along with many dead fish. At Tropea several boats that were on the beach were carried out to sea. Further to the north at Scalea, there was more than 30 m of inundation and several beached boats were taken out to sea.

The submarine telegraph cable connecting the Aeolian Islands to Milazzo on Sicily was broken at a depth of 1180 m, presumably by a turbidity current caused by slope failure triggered by the earthquake.

== Damage ==
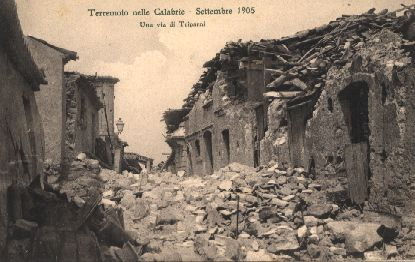
Damage of the earthquake in Triparni (Vibo Valentia)

The provinces of Catanzaro (including what is now the Province of Vibo Valentia), Cosenza and Reggio Calabria were the most affected parts of Calabria. 14,000 houses were damaged, with 8,220 houses being destroyed, 6,186 in Catanzaro, 1,000 in Cosenza and 1,034 in Reggio Calabria. In the Vibo Valentia area, the towns of Parghelia, Piscopio and Stefanaconi and several smaller towns, were almost completely destroyed. Many of the houses in the epicentral area were built of "breste" (adobe type) construction and these performed very poorly in the earthquake.

The earthquake triggered many landslides, with at least 42 sites being recorded. The village of Martirano, which has been repeatedly affected by landslides triggered by earthquakes in the past, had one side destroyed by a landslide. Evidence of ground fissures and liquefaction was widespread and many streams and springs were changed in both flow rate and temperature, immediately after the earthquake.

Mario Baratta, writing in 1906, observed that level of damage was related to the underlying geology. He noted that structures built on limestone, molasse, breccia and schist suffered the greatest damage, while those constructed on granite fared much better.

== Aftermath ==
Immediate aid was organised by the Prefects, using civil and military engineers and local medical and military personnel. Temporary accommodation was provided for some of the people made homeless with the building of wooden shacks. In October 1906 the Prefect of Cantanzaro reported that many families remained homeless, while those in the shacks were affected by their poor quality, with both wind and rain being able to penetrate these structures. Other families stayed in ruined houses in a dangerous condition, using a few poorly repaired rooms. He also stated that many farmers had emigrated from the area.

On 25 June a new state law came into force to provide assistance for the most affected areas, including the waiving of some tax instalments.

Some settlements, such as Favelloni and Castiglione Cosentino were moved to new sites. The part of Martirano that was levelled by the landslide was rebuilt on a new site nearby.

== See also ==
- List of earthquakes in 1905
- List of earthquakes in Italy
