= Amedeo Mormile =

Italian politician

President of the Province of Catanzaro
- Incumbent
- Assumed office 29 September 2022
- Preceded by: Sergio Abramo

Mayor of Soveria Simeri
- Incumbent
- Assumed office 6 June 2016
- In office 30 May 2006 – 17 May 2011

Personal details
- Born: Mario Amedeo Mormile; 17 August 1962 (age 63) Catanzaro, Italy
- Party: UDEUR; Lega

Amedeo Mormile (born 17 August 1962) is an Italian politician serving as president of the Province of Catanzaro since 2022.

== Life and career ==
Mormile began his political career in 2001 as a municipal councillor and deputy mayor in Soveria Simeri, initially representing the Communist Refoundation Party. He later joined the Union of Democrats for Europe (UDEUR). In May 2006 he was elected mayor.

He served as a member of the Provincial Council of Catanzaro from 2008 to 2013 and was elected to the council again in 2021.

Mormile was re-elected mayor of Soveria Simeri in 2016 and secured a second consecutive term in 2021. During his second mayoralty, he joined Lega.

In 2022, he was nominated by the centre-right coalition as its candidate for president of the Province of Catanzaro. He was elected on 29 September 2022, defeating his opponent Nicola Fiorita, mayor of Catanzaro.

In February 2025, Mormile was appointed provincial commissioner of Lega.
