= Sant'Agata al Borgo, Catania =

Church building in Catania, Italy

Coordinates: 37°31′06″N 15°5′00″E

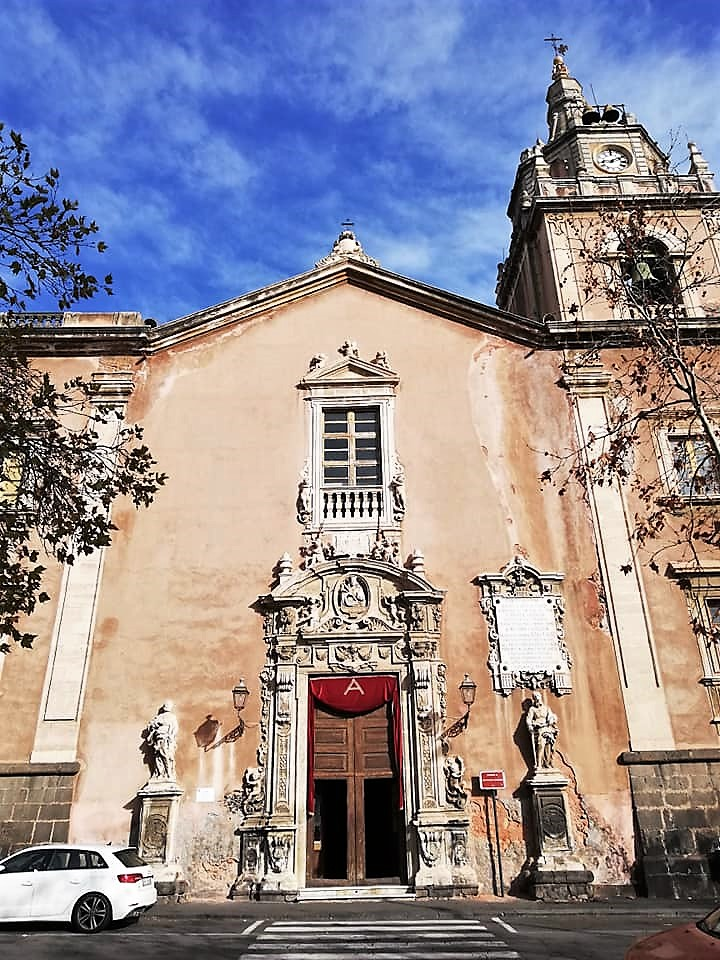
Facade of church

Sant'Agata al Borgo is a Roman Catholic church in Catania, Sicily, southern Italy. The church rises alongside via Etna. In front of the church is the tree-lined Piazza Cavour (once calle Piazza Borgo) with its fountain of Cerere, while south across the piazza rises the church of the Consolazione. The Borgo is one of the original four districts (quartieri) of Catania.

== Description ==
The church was initially built after the eruption of Aetna in 1669, to serve the villagers displaced by the lava flows. Damaged by the 1693 Sicily earthquake; it was rebuilt again. The interior has a single nave, decorated in frescoes in the early 18th century by Giovanni Lo Coco, who was called "U surdu di Iaci". The apse frescoes, painted by Giovanni Lo Coco, depict events in the Life of Saint Agatha, the titular saint, and patron of Catania.

A plaque on the right of the facade recalls an event occurring after the 1908 earthquake, which devastated Messina and Reggio. The townspeople, terrified by the tremors, led from this church a procession with the veil of Saint Agatha, guided by the Archbishop and Cardinal Giustino Francica Nava, to thank the patron saint of the town for sparing Catania.
