= Siculo-Calabrian rift =

Geological feature in Italy

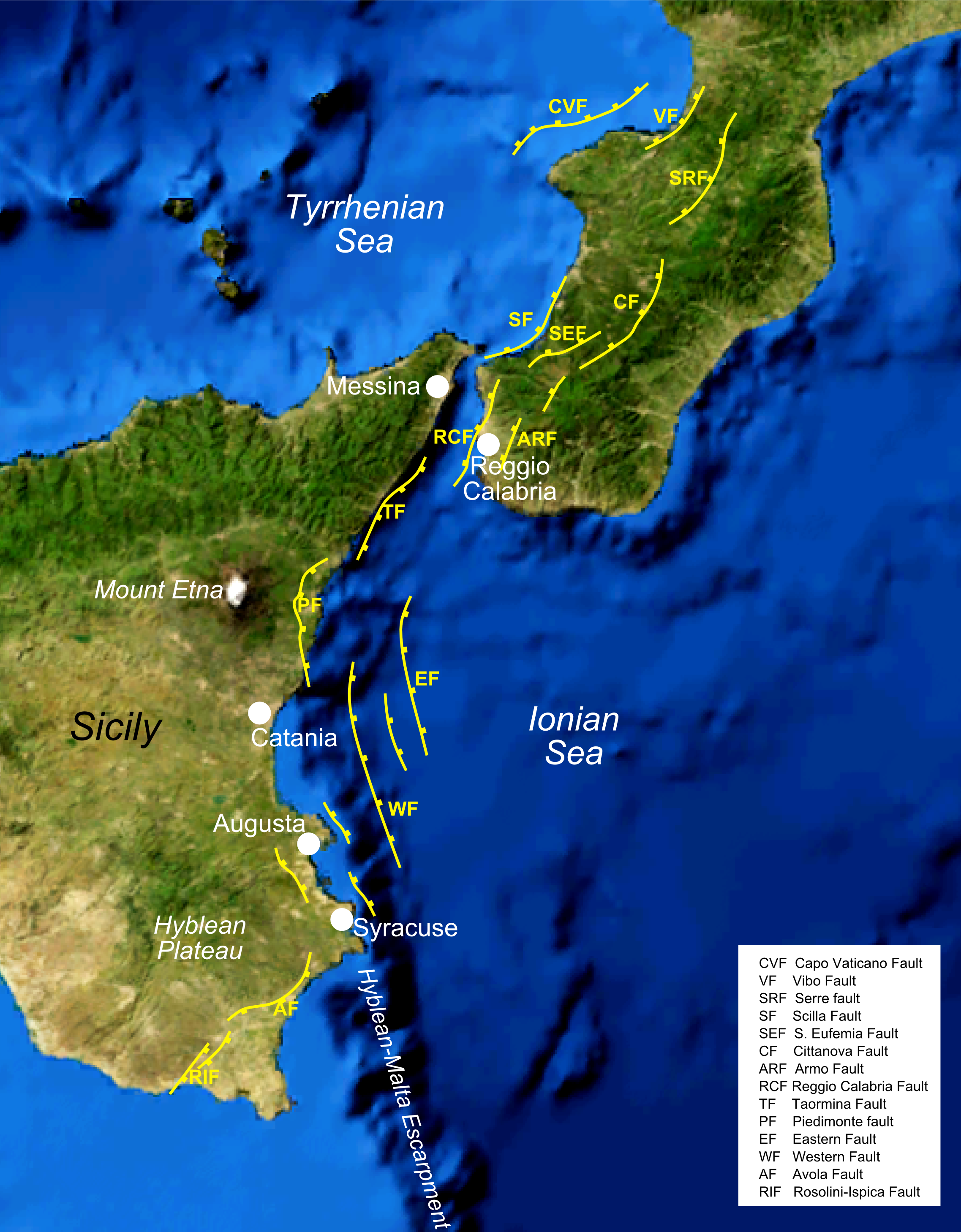
Main faults of the Siculo-Calabrian rift zone (northernmost section not shown)

The Siculo-Calabrian rift is a zone of active extensional tectonics running about 200 km from northern Calabria to near Syracuse in Sicily. It is formed of a series of overlapping normal faults that control graben and half-graben on their downthrown sides. These faults have regularly ruptured historically, causing destructive earthquakes, often in sequences, such as the 1783 Calabrian earthquakes.

== Extent ==
The Siculo-Calabrian rift zone extends southwards from the Crati valley in northern Calabria to near Catanzaro with a north–south trend. It continues through the northwestern part of central and southern Calabria, extending partly offshore, with a northeast–southwest trend. It then passes through the Strait of Messina into the Ionian Sea with a north–south trend with most of the faults in this part of the rift zone lying offshore. South of Syracuse the trend again becomes northeast–southwest trending, with the fault segments cutting through the southern tip of Sicily. The active faults of the rift control the topography and in some cases define the coastline.

The rift zone is part of a larger zone of extensional faulting that continues northwards from Calabria through the southern and central Apennines before dying out in the northern Apennines.

== Origin ==
The later Neogene history of central and southern Italy shows a transition from thrust tectonics to extensional tectonics. The transition is interpreted to be a result of slab rollback affecting Tethyan oceanic crust of the African Plate as it subducts beneath the Eurasian Plate. The initial result of the rollback was the formation of the Tyrrhenian Sea back-arc basin starting in the Miocene, continuing in to the Pleistocene. The location of the extension migrated eastwards overall, progressively affecting areas previously affected by thrusting. Many of the active rift faults border basins containing Pliocene–Pleistocene sedimentary sequences.

== Seismicity ==
All of the faults in the Siculo-Calabrian rift show evidence of recent activity and virtually all of them are associated with historical earthquakes. In 1638 there was a sequence of four earthquakes of magnitude >6.5, caused by movement on four faults in the rift system. The 1659 Calabria earthquake is thought to have ruptured the central part of the Serre Fault in southwestern Calabria. The disastrous 1693 earthquake that struck eastern Sicily was undoubtedly caused by rupture on one of the faults, possibly the Western Fault offshore, although the precise fault or faults remain unknown. In 1783 the southwestern part of Calabria was struck by a sequence of five earthquakes of M≥5.9, including two of M7.0. These ruptured another five of the rift faults, including parts of the Serre Fault that did not move in 1659. In 1905 the Capo Vaticano Fault ruptured in a M7.2 earthquake, followed 3 years later by the devastating 1908 Messina earthquake, although the fault responsible is still a matter of debate. Together these earthquakes ruptured almost the whole length of the rift over a roughly 250-year period.
