= Santa Teresa, Catania =

Church building in Catania, Italy

Coordinates: 37.50499°N 15.08883°E

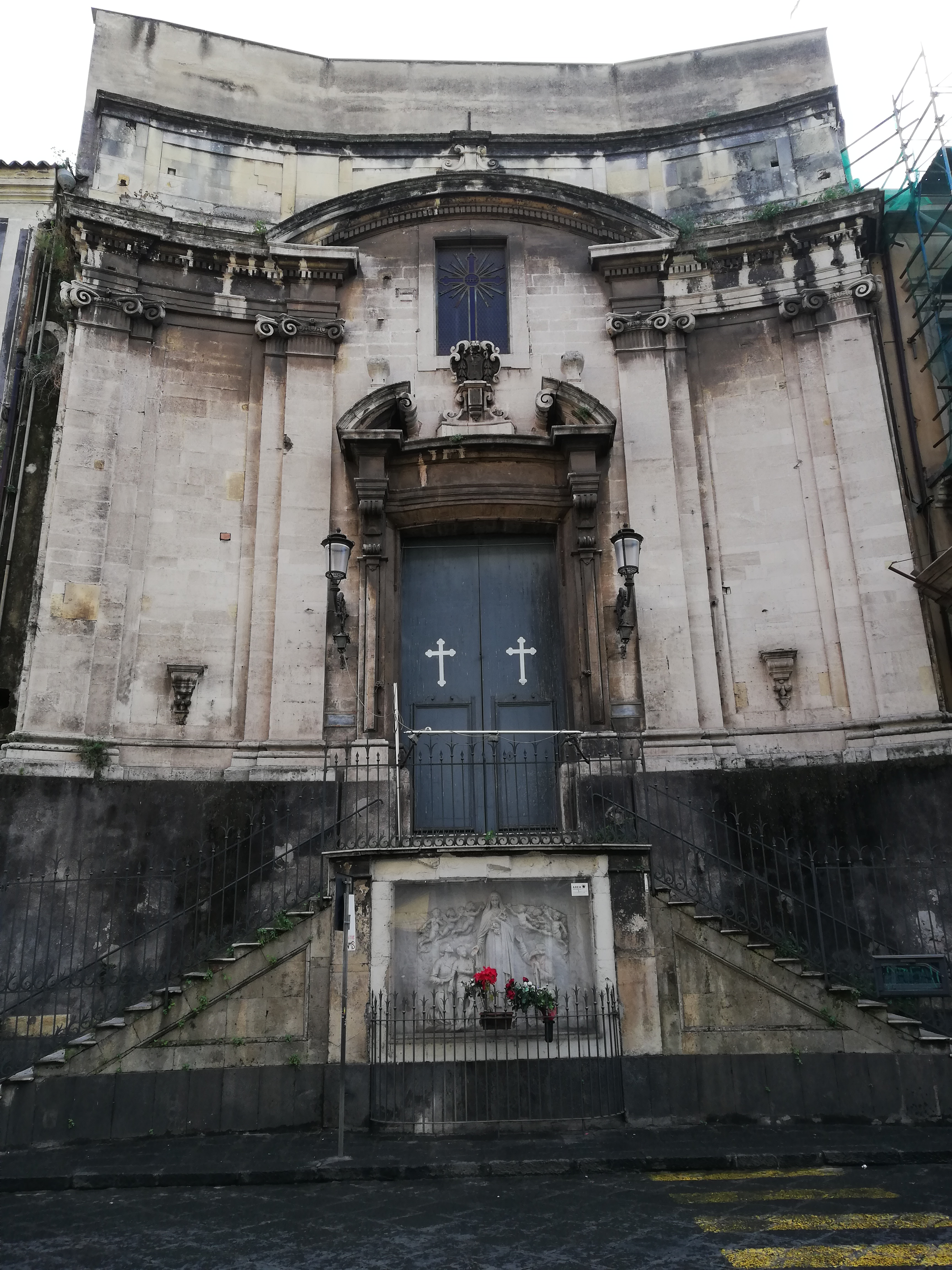
Facade of church with staircases and modern marble relief of the Virgin Mary.

Santa Teresa, also called Santa Teresa del Bambin Gesú or Bambino Gesú is a Roman Catholic parish church and Discalced Carmelite cloistered convent, located on Via Antonino Di Sangiuliano #219, at the intersection with via Santa Teresa, in Catania, region of Sicily, southern Italy.

== History and description ==
Monks of the order of Discalced Carmelites arrived in Catania in 1642-1643 and were initially located at the church of Santo Spirito outside town. In 1677, that church was destroyed to enhance the defenses against the besieging French army. For a time they stayed in houses belonging to the nobleman Giovanni Tedeschi. The present structures, a church and attached convent were not built until after the 1693 earthquake. The church facade is set on a high black stone plinth, is accessed through a double staircase, and has a broken pediment over the portal.
