= Francesco Squillace =

Italian politician (1925–2020)

President of the Province of Catanzaro
- In office 7 May 1975 – 1975
- Preceded by: Carmelo Pujia
- Succeeded by: Giuseppe Lelio Petronio

Mayor of Chiaravalle Centrale
- In office 1960–1965
- In office 1954–1956

Personal details
- Born: 6 November 1925 Chiaravalle Centrale, Calabria, Italy
- Died: 7 June 2020 (aged 94)
- Party: Christian Democracy

Francesco Squillace (6 November 1925 – 6 June 2020) was an Italian lawyer, politician, and a member of the Christian Democracy party. Squillace served as president of the Province of Catanzaro, in Calabria, for a brief tenure in 1975. He also served as the mayor of Chiaravalle Centrale for two terms in the 1950s and 1960s, as well as a member of the Provincial Council of Catanzaro. Additionally, he was the former Catanzaro provincial secretary of the Christian Democrats (DC).

Squillace died on 6 June 2020 at the age of 94.
