= Palazzo San Demetrio, Catania =

Palace in Catania, Italy

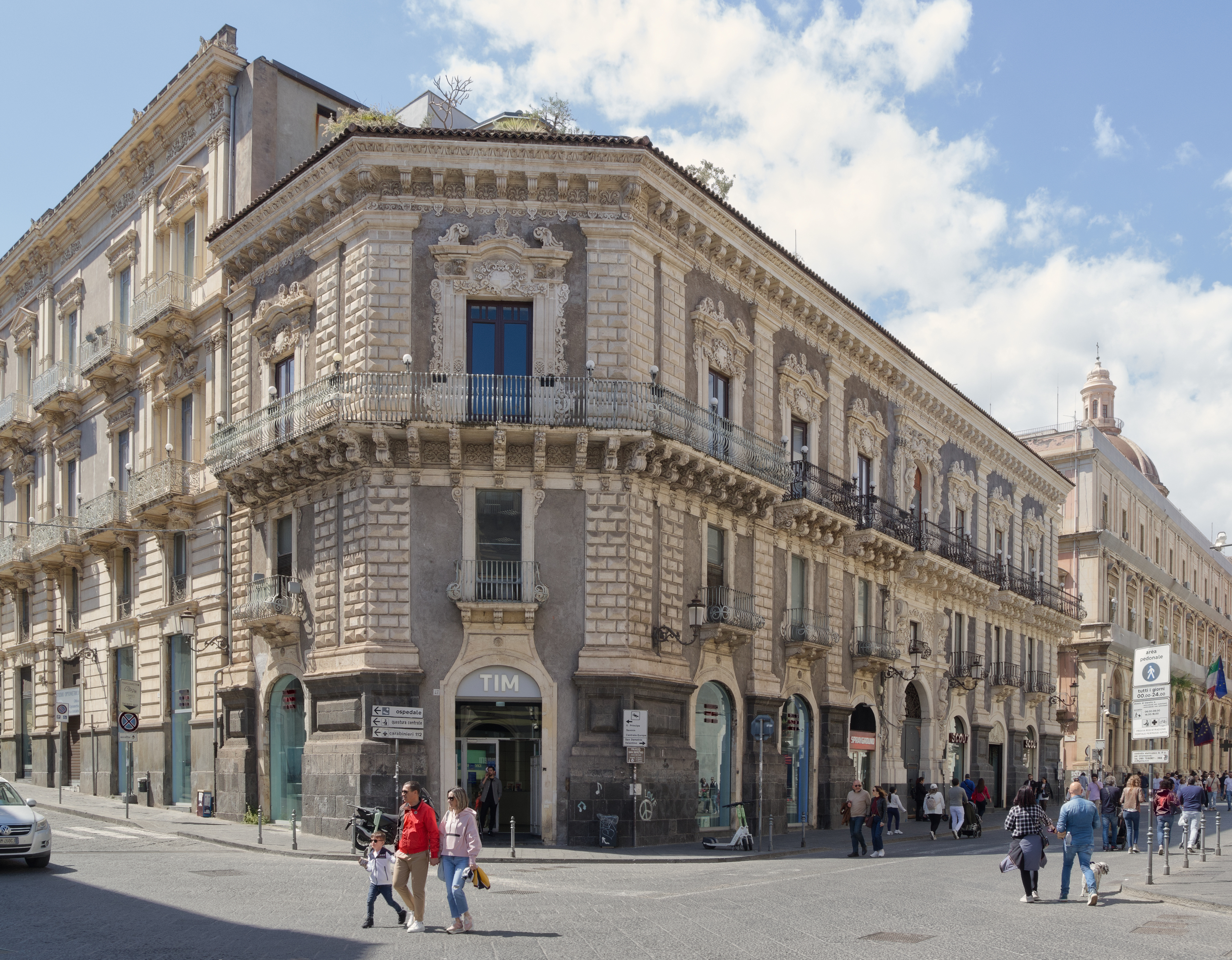

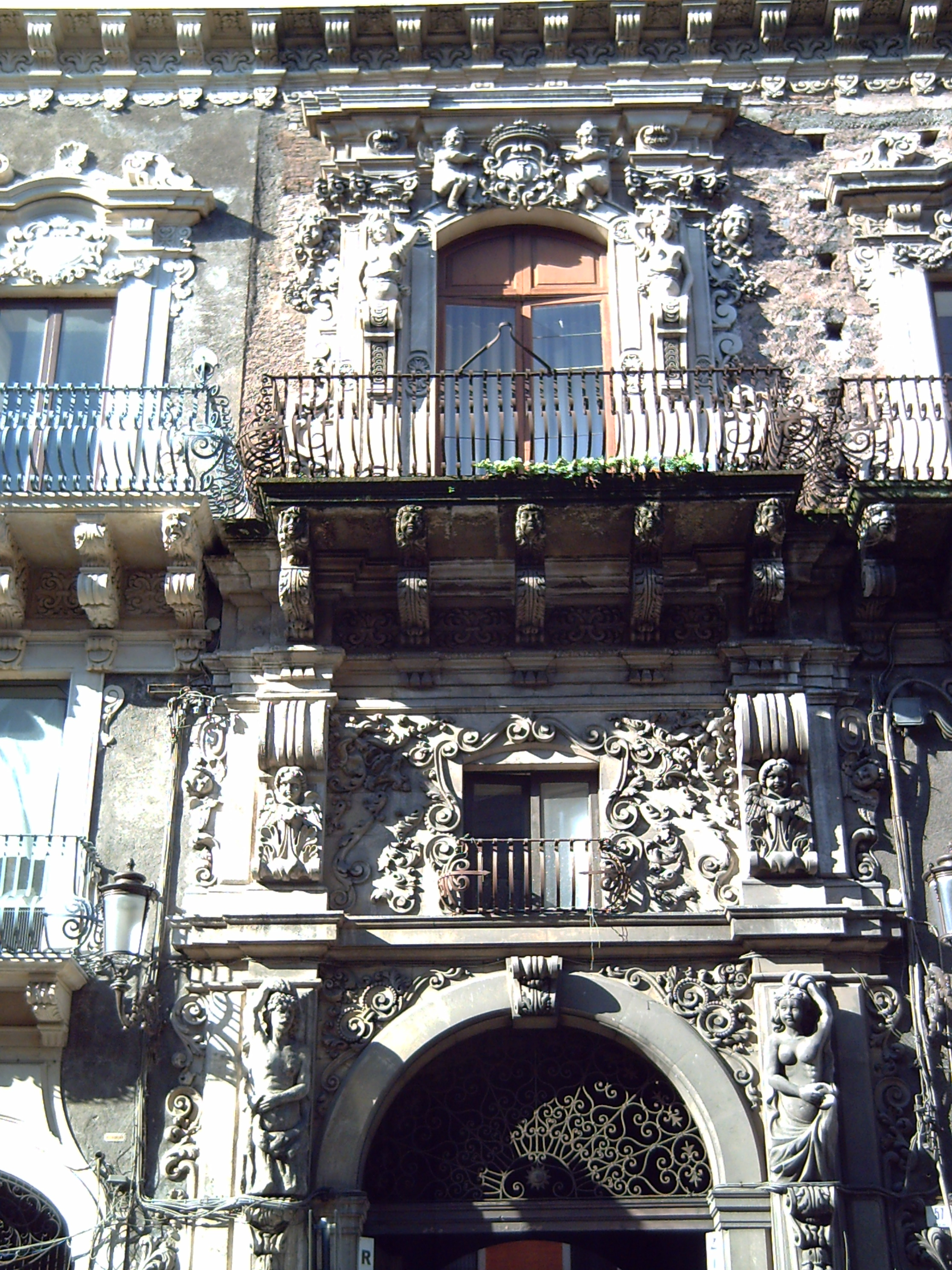

The Palazzo San Demetrio is a late-Baroque style palace located at via Etna #55, where via Etna intersects Via San Giuliano, in the city center of Catania, region of Sicily, Italy. The palace is remarkable for its highly sculptural portal.

Once called Palazzo Massa di San Gregorio, because the present facade dates to the reconstruction after the 1693 Sicily earthquake. The structure was commissioned by the Baron of San Gregorio, Don Eusebio Massa. In 1714, the palace was acquired by Salvatore Pellegrino, Baron of San Demetrio. Sold in the early 20th century, it underwent varied refurbishments and internal alterations. In April 1944, the palace was destroyed during an allied bombardment, and 70 people who had sought refuge in the palace died. The palace was rebuilt with the same stones.
