= Michele Traversa =

Italian politician (1948–2025)

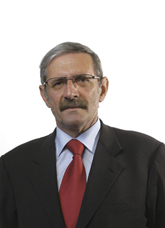
- Traversa in 2008

Member of the Chamber of Deputies of Italy for Calabria
- In office 29 April 2008 – 14 March 2013

Mayor of Catanzaro
- In office 16 May 2011 – 10 January 2012
- Preceded by: Rosario Olivo
- Succeeded by: Sergio Abramo

President of the Province of Catanzaro
- In office 13 June 1999 – 27 April 2008
- Preceded by: Giuseppe Martino
- Succeeded by: Wanda Ferro

Personal details
- Born: 26 April 1948 Botricello, Italy
- Died: 11 April 2025 (aged 76) Catanzaro, Italy
- Party: MSI (until 1995); AN (1995–2009); PdL (2009–2013); FI (2013–2025)
- Occupation: Trade unionist

Michele Traversa (26 April 1948 – 11 April 2025) was an Italian politician. A member of the National Alliance and The People of Freedom, he served as president of the Province of Catanzaro from 1999 to 2008 and was a member of the Chamber of Deputies from 2008 to 2013.

Traversa died in Catanzaro on 11 April 2025, at the age of 76.
