= Carmelo Pujia (politician) =

Italian politician (1927–2022)

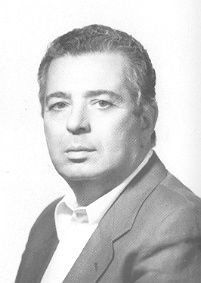
- Pujia in 1980

Member of the Chamber of Deputies of Italy
- In office 12 July 1983 – 14 April 1994
- Constituency: Calabria

President of the Province of Catanzaro
- In office 1970–1975
- Preceded by: Aldo Ferrara
- Succeeded by: Francesco Squillace

Personal details
- Born: 5 October 1927 Polia, Italy
- Died: 8 January 2022 (aged 94) Rome, Italy
- Party: DC

Carmelo Pujia (5 October 1927 – 8 January 2022) was an Italian politician. A member of the Christian Democracy party, he served as president of the Province of Catanzaro from 1970 to 1975 and in the Chamber of Deputies from 1983 to 1994. He died in Rome on 8 January 2022, at the age of 94.
