= Enzo Bruno (politician) =

Italian politician (born 1959)

Member of the Regional Council of Calabria
- Incumbent
- Assumed office 5 October 2025

President of the Province of Catanzaro
- In office 14 October 2014 – 2 November 2018
- Preceded by: Wanda Ferro
- Succeeded by: Sergio Abramo

Personal details
- Born: Vincenzo Bruno; 20 July 1959 (age 67) Vallefiorita, Province of Catanzaro, Italy
- Party: Democratic Party

Enzo Bruno (born Vincenzo Bruno; 20 July 1959) is an Italian politician serving as a member of the Regional Council of Calabria since 2025. He previously served as president of the Province of Catanzaro from 2014 to 2018.

== Career ==
Bruno entered politics in the mid-1980s, serving several times as a municipal councillor and assessor for the municipality of Vallefiorita, initially with the Italian Communist Party (PCI) and later with the Democratic Party of the Left (PDS) and the Democrats of the Left (DS).

From 1993 to 1997, he served as deputy mayor of Vallefiorita. In 1999, he was elected to the Provincial Council of Catanzaro, and was re-elected in 2004 and 2008 with the Democratic Party (PD). In October 2014, he was elected president of the Province of Catanzaro with 41% of the vote, defeating centre-right candidate Tommaso Brutto.

Bruno was elected to the Regional Council of Calabria in the 2025 Calabrian regional election, winning 2,728 preference votes on the "Tridico Presidente" list in the central constituency.
