= List of presidents of the Province of Catanzaro =

President of the Province of Catanzaro
- Presidente della Provincia di Catanzaro
- Incumbent; Amedeo Mormile since 29 September 2022
- Term length: 4 years
- Inaugural holder: Carlo Sanseverino
- Formation: 1889

The president of the Province of Catanzaro is the head of the provincial government in Catanzaro, Calabria, Italy. The president oversees the administration of the province, coordinates the activities of the municipalities, and represents the province in regional and national matters.

Since September 2022, the office has been held by Amedeo Mormile of Lega party.

== List ==
=== Presidents of the Provincial Deputation (1889–1927) ===
No.	Portrait	Name	Term start	Term end	Party
1		Carlo Sanseverino	1889	1894	
2		Giuseppe Martelli	1894	1903	
3		Michele Le Pera	1903	1905	
4		Edoardo Squillace	1905	1910	
5		Francesco Burza	1910	1914	
6		Giovanni Francesco Pugliese	1914	1919	
7		Evelino Marincola Sanfloro	1919	1920	
8		Michele Tedeschi	1920	1923	
9		Edoardo Salerno	1923	1924	National Fascist Party
10		Nicola Fraggio	1924	1925	National Fascist Party
11		Antonio Le Pera	1925	1927	National Fascist Party

=== Presidents of the Provincial Rectorate (1927–1943) ===
No.	Portrait	Name	Took office	Left office	Party
1		Giuseppe Di Tocco	1928	1934	National Fascist Party
2		Vincenzo D'Agostino	1934	1937	National Fascist Party
3		Nicola Sicialini	1937	1943	National Fascist Party

=== Presidents of the Provincial Deputation (1943–1951) ===
No.	Portrait	Name	Took office	Left office	Party
1		Sebastiano Iannini	1943	1948	?
2		Fausto Bisantis	1948	1951	Christian Democracy

=== Presidents of the Province (1951–present) ===
No.	Portrait	Name	Term start	Term end	Party
1		Fausto Bisantis	1951	1957	Christian Democracy
2		Francesco Antonio Lazzaro	1958	1958	?
3		Aldo Ferrara	1958	1970	Christian Democracy
4		Carmelo Pujia	1970	1975	Christian Democracy
5		Francesco Squillace	7 May 1975	1975	Christian Democracy
6		Giuseppe Lelio Petronio	1975	1979	Italian Socialist Party
7		Domenico Costa	1979	1981	?
8		Felice D'Agostino	1981	1985	Italian Socialist Party
9		Leopoldo Chieffallo	24 October 1985	4 August 1990	Italian Socialist Party
10		Pietro Amato	4 August 1990	19 June 1992	Italian Socialist Party
11		Francesco Mirante	19 June 1992	1994	Christian Democracy
12		Marcello Barberio	1994	8 May 1995	Democratic Party of the Left
13		Giuseppe Martino	8 May 1995	28 June 1999	Forza Italia
14		Michele Traversa	28 June 1999	1 July 2004	National Alliance
14		Michele Traversa	1 July 2004	26 February 2008	National Alliance
15		Wanda Ferro	29 April 2008	1 May 2013	National Alliance; The People of Freedom
—		Wanda Ferro	1 May 2013	14 October 2014	Special commissioner
16		Enzo Bruno	14 October 2014	2 November 2018	Democratic Party
17		Sergio Abramo	2 November 2018	30 June 2022	Forza Italia; Coraggio Italia
—		Fernando Sinopoli (acting)	30 June 2022	29 September 2022	Coraggio Italia
18		Amedeo Mormile	29 September 2022	Incumbent	Lega

== Sources ==
- "Storia amministrativa dell'ente". Ministero dell'Interno.
- "Elenco storico dei Presidenti della Provincia di Catanzaro" (PDF). Provincia di Catanzaro.
- Menichini, Piera (2005). "I presidenti delle Province dall'Unità alla Grande guerra: repertorio analitico". Storia Amministrazione Costituzione (13): 241–242.
