= Sergio Abramo =

Italian politician and entrepreneur

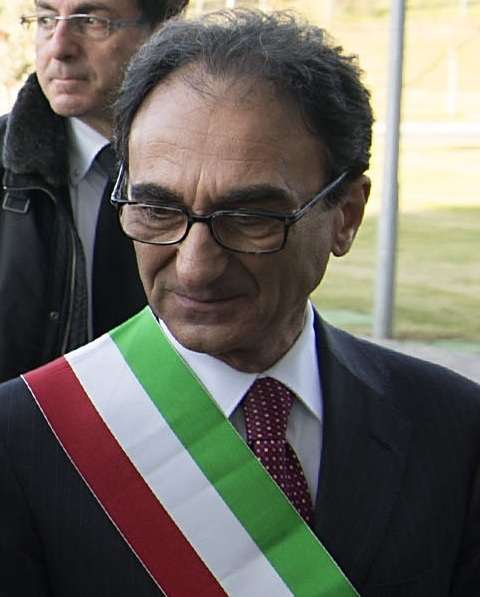

Mayor of Catanzaro
- In office 7 May 2012 – 30 June 2022
- Preceded by: Michele Traversa
- Succeeded by: Nicola Fiorita
- In office 11 May 1997 – 18 April 2005
- Preceded by: Benito Gualtieri
- Succeeded by: Rosario Olivo

President of the Province of Catanzaro
- In office 2 November 2018 – 30 June 2022
- Preceded by: Enzo Bruno
- Succeeded by: Amedeo Mormile

Personal details
- Born: 29 March 1958 (age 68) Catanzaro, Italy
- Party: Forza Italia (until 2021); Coraggio Italia (since 2021)
- Occupation: Politician

Sergio Abramo (born 29 March 1958) is an Italian politician and entrepreneur. He is member of the Forza Italia. He was born in Catanzaro, Italy.

== Biography ==
He earned a high school diploma in the sciences and took courses in business management at Bocconi University in Milan. He began his career at the family business, “Le Grafiche Abramo S.r.l.,” where he became President and CEO in 1986, positions he held until 1997. In 1988, he was elected president of the Young Industrialists of Calabria, and in 1996 he joined the national executive committee of General Confederation of Italian Industry. He has served as President of Sorical (since 2010), a public-private partnership that manages the procurement and supply of drinking water throughout the Calabria.

Political offices
Preceded by Enzo Bruno	President of the Province of Catanzaro; 2018–2022	Succeeded by Amedeo Mormile
Preceded by Michele Traversa	Mayor of Catanzaro; 2012–2022	Succeeded by Nicola Fiorita
Preceded by Benito Gualtieri	Mayor of Catanzaro; 1997–2005	Succeeded by Rosario Olivo
