= Nico Stumpo =

Italian politician (born 1969)

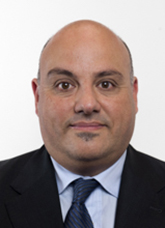
- Stumpo in 2018

Member of the Chamber of Deputies
- Incumbent
- Assumed office 15 March 2013
- Constituency: Calabria

Personal details
- Born: 20 August 1969 (age 56)
- Party: Democratic Party

Nicola Stumpo (born 20 August 1969) is an Italian politician serving as a member of the Chamber of Deputies since 2013. From 2009 to 2013, he served as organizational secretary of the Democratic Party.
