= Giuseppe Lelio Petronio =

Italian politician (1937–2017)

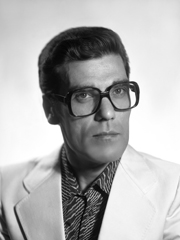

Member of the Senate of the Republic
- In office 9 July 1987 – 22 April 1992
- In office 20 June 1979 – 14 July 1981

President of the Province of Catanzaro
- In office 1975–1979
- Preceded by: Francesco Squillace
- Succeeded by: Domenico Costa

Personal details
- Born: 29 November 1937 Sambiase, Province of Catanzaro, Kingdom of Italy
- Died: 29 May 2017 (aged 79) Lamezia Terme, Calabria, Italy
- Party: Italian Socialist Party
- Profession: Pharmacist

Giuseppe Lelio Petronio (29 November 1937 – 29 May 2017) was an Italian politician who served as mayor of Lamezia Terme, president of the Province of Catanzaro (1975–1979), and a member of the Senate of the Republic (1979–1981, 1987–1992). He also served as Undersecretary of State to the Presidency of the Council of Ministers in the Goria and De Mita governments, and as Undersecretary of State for Transport in the Andreotti VI and Andreotti VII governments.
