= Simona Loizzo =

Italian politician (born 1965)

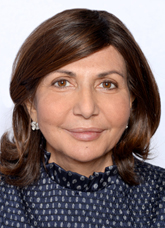
- Loizzo in 2022

Member of the Chamber of Deputies
- Incumbent
- Assumed office 13 October 2022
- Constituency: Calabria

Personal details
- Born: 20 February 1965 (age 61)
- Party: Lega

Simona Loizzo (born 20 February 1965) is an Italian politician of Lega who was elected member of the Chamber of Deputies in 2022. She previously served as group leader of Lega in the Regional Council of Calabria.
