= Aldo Ferrara =

Italian lawyer and politician (1921–1997)

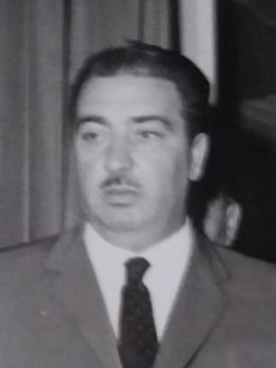
- Ferrara in 1967

President of Calabria
- In office 1 January 1976 – 10 June 1980
- Preceded by: Pasquale Perugini
- Succeeded by: Bruno Dominijanni
- In office 2 October 1974 – 17 June 1975
- Preceded by: Antonio Guarasci
- Succeeded by: Pasquale Perugini

Member of the Regional Council of Calabria
- In office 1970–1980

President of the Province of Catanzaro
- In office 1958–1970
- Preceded by: Francesco Antonio Lazzaro
- Succeeded by: Carmelo Pujia

Mayor of Catanzaro
- In office 10 July 1980 – 10 December 1982
- Preceded by: Cesare Mulè
- Succeeded by: Marcello Furriolo

Personal details
- Born: 18 December 1921 Serra San Bruno, Province of Catanzaro, Kingdom of Italy
- Died: 5 February 1997 (aged 75) Catanzaro, Calabria, Italy
- Party: Christian Democracy
- Profession: Lawyer

Aldo Ferrara (18 December 1921 – 5 February 1997) was an Italian lawyer and politician who served as president of Calabria (1974–1975; 1976–1980), president of the Province of Catanzaro (1958–1970), and mayor of Catanzaro (1980–1982).
