= Giuseppe Mangialavori =

Italian politician

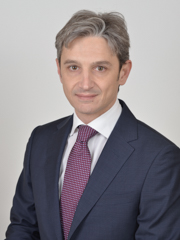

Senator of the Legislature XVIII of Italy
- Incumbent
- Assumed office 16 March 2018
- Constituency: Calabria

Personal details
- Born: 11 February 1975 (age 51) Merano, Italy
- Education: Magna Græcia University

Giuseppe Mangialavori (born 11 February 1975) is an Italian politician. He is a senator of the Republic of Italy and a member of the Legislature XVIII of Italy. He has been Regional Coordinator of Forza Italia in Calabria since March 2021.

== Biography ==
Mangialavori was born in Merano in the autonomous province of Bolzano on 11 February 1975. He is the nephew of entrepreneur Filippo Callipo (owner of the food group of the same name and known as the "King of Tuna").

At 24 he graduated in Medicine from the Magna Græcia University of Catanzaro before specialising in Radiology at the University of Bari. Mangialavori was the head of Mastology (the study and treatment of breast disease) at Merano hospital before becoming medical manager of the Mastology department at the Polyclinic of Bari, aged 32.

=== Political activity ===
He began his political career in 2010 in the administrative elections of Vibo Valentia as a candidate for the centre-right party The People of Freedom (Italian: Popolo della Libertà), in support of mayoral candidate Nicola D'Agostino, where was elected as president of the municipal council.

=== Election to the regional council ===
On 16 November 2013 the activities of Popolo della Libertà were suspended following the reformation of Silvio Berlusconi's Forza Italia. Subsequently, in 2014 Mangialavori ran, and was elected for, the position of regional councillor for the House of Freedoms (Italian: Casa delle Libertà) political party, in support of the former president of the Province of Catanzaro Wanda Ferro.

In 2017 he lost his seat after the Regional Administrative Court (Italian: Tribunale amministrativo regionale) ruled that as a losing presidential candidate Ferro had a right to enter the regional council and was entitled to the seat occupied by Mangialavori.

=== Election to the Senate ===
In the 2018 general elections he was elected to the Senate of the Republic for Forza Italia. On 7 June, following the resignation of Wanda Ferro (elected to the Chamber of Deputies), Mangialavori returned to the regional council. However he resigned the following June opting instead for a seat in the Senate.

On 9 November 2018 he became vice-president of the Forza Italia group in the Senate, as well as commissioner for Vibo Valentia province. In March 2021 he became the Regional Coordinator of the party.

He is a member of the 9th Permanent Commission (Agriculture and agri-food production) and also sits on the committee of the parliamentary commission of inquiry into mafias and other criminal associations.

== Controversy ==
In 2019, Mangialavori was accused of involvement with the organized crime syndicate 'Ndrangheta by supplying logistic ideas for the organization in exchange for support in his election. Additionally, his daughter has been accused of working for a known member of the organization. While authorities appear to be looking into the claims, other parties involved in the scandal have resigned, and the case involving Mangialavori appears to have gone to the upper courts.
