= Fausto Bisantis =

Italian lawyer and politician (1909–1996)

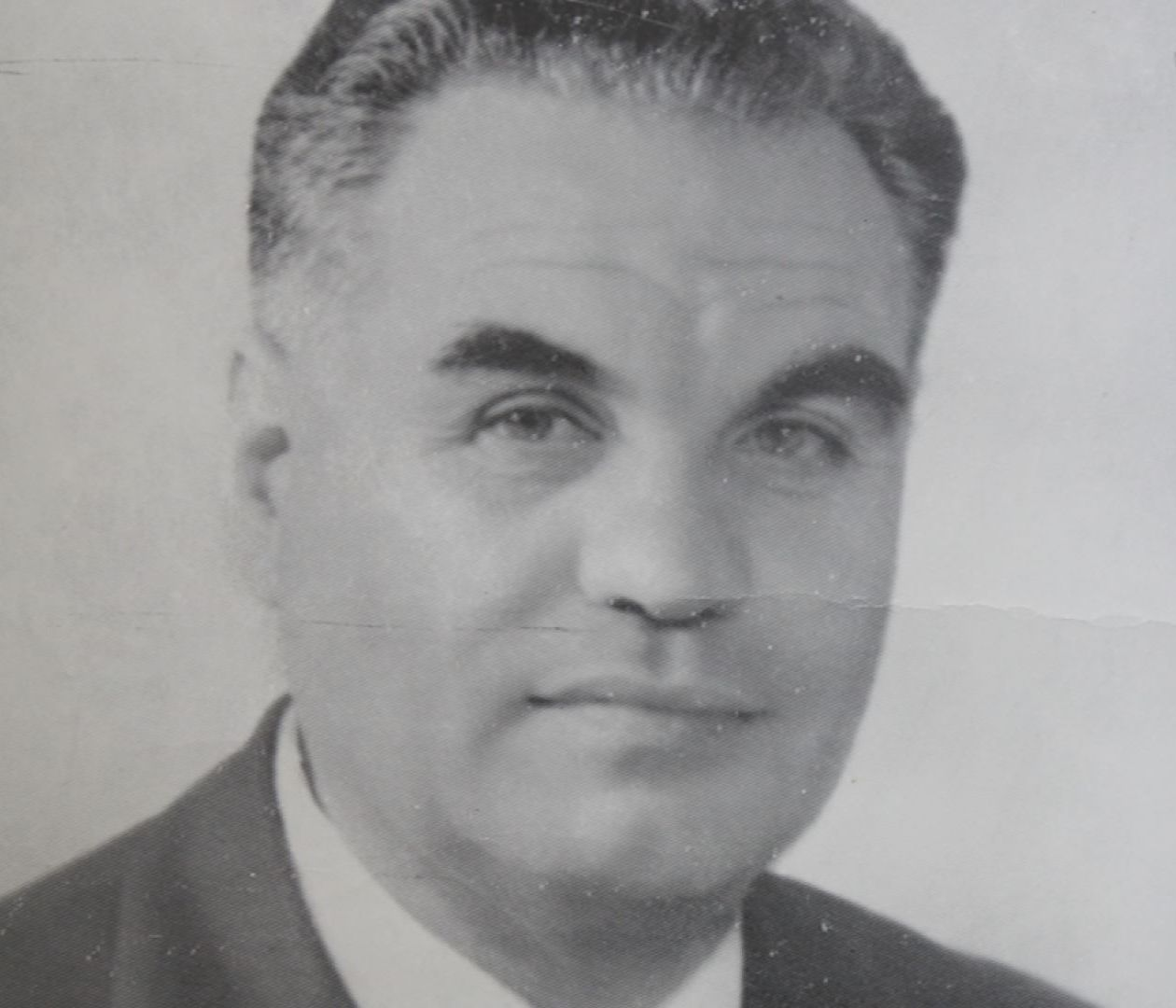

President of the Province of Catanzaro
- In office 1948–1957
- Preceded by: Sebastiano Iannini
- Succeeded by: Francesco Antonio Lazzaro

Member of the Chamber of Deputies
- In office 1958–1968

Member of the Senate
- In office 1968–1972

Mayor of Catanzaro
- In office 16 July 1975 – 24 February 1978
- Preceded by: Francesco Pucci
- Succeeded by: Cesare Mulè

Personal details
- Born: 30 April 1909 Gimigliano, Province of Catanzaro, Kingdom of Italy
- Died: 8 January 1996 (aged 86) Catanzaro, Calabria, Italy
- Party: Christian Democracy
- Education: University of Naples Federico II
- Profession: Lawyer

Fausto Bisantis (30 April 1909 – 8 January 1996) was an Italian lawyer and politician who served as president of the Province of Catanzaro (1948–1957), deputy (1958–1968), senator (1968–1972), and mayor of Catanzaro (1975–1978).
