= 1659 Calabria earthquake =

Earthquakes in Italy

- Location within Italy
- Magnitude: M_{e} 6.6
- Epicenter: 38.696°N 16.250°E
- Areas affected: Italy
- Max. intensity: MMI X (Extreme)
- Casualties: 2,035–2,042 dead

The 1659 Calabria earthquake devastated present-day southern Italy on 5 November. It had an estimated energy magnitude of 6.6. The towns of Filadelfia, Chiaravalle Centrale, Filogaso, Panaia, Polia Antica, San Demetrio Corone and Stefanaconi were assigned X (Extreme) on the Mercalli-Cancani-Sieberg scale. The reports of destruction corresponded with a 10 km (6.2 mi) section of the Serre Fault that did not rupture during the next major earthquakes in 1783. This meant the central portion of the Serre Fault is a probably candidate for the earthquake source. The rupture on this fault segment reduced the Coulomb stress, which was sufficient for it to remain unruptured in 1783. The 1659 earthquake affect the region between those affected by earthquakes on 7 February and 28 March 1783. It represents the first major earthquake in a seismic sequence on faults in southern Calabria, with the last major earthquake in 1908.

At least 2,035 people died including 496 in Panaija, 203 in Polia, 193 in Castelrnonardo, 161 in Filogaso and 160 in Soriano. Over 30 villages were badly damaged or destroyed in Catanzaro.
