= Elisa Scutellà =

Italian politician (born 1987)

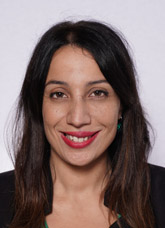
- Scutellà in 2022

Member of the Chamber of Deputies
- In office 23 March 2018 – 12 March 2025
- Succeeded by: Anna Laura Orrico
- Constituency: Calabria – P01 (2018–2022); Calabria – P01 (2022–2025)

Personal details
- Born: 31 October 1987 (age 38)
- Party: Five Star Movement

Elisa Scutellà (born 31 October 1987) is an Italian politician serving as a member of the Regional Council of Calabria since 2025. From 2018 to 2025, she was a member of the Chamber of Deputies.
