= Federica Dieni =

Italian politician (born 1986)

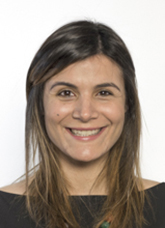

Deputy of the Italian Republic
- In office March 15, 2013 – October 13, 2022

Personal details
- Born: March 6, 1986 (age 40) Reggio Calabria, Italy
- Party: IV (from 2022); M5S (until 2022)
- Education: Mediterranea University of Reggio Calabria
- Occupation: Politician

Federica Dieni (born 6 March 1986) is an Italian politician who has been a member of the Chamber of Deputies for the Five Star Movement since 2013. She represents the city of Reggio Calabria.

== Biography ==
She was born in Reggio Calabria on March 6, 1986. After earning her high school diploma in the science track, she received her law degree with a thesis in administrative law titled “The Compliance Judgment in the New Code of Administrative Law” from the Mediterranea University of Reggio Calabria in October 2011.

He then earned a Level II master’s degree in “Peace Policies and Development Cooperation in the Mediterranean Region” with a thesis titled “European Funds for the Development of Southern Italy” at the “Dante Alighieri” Università per stranieri "Dante Alighieri" di Reggio Calabria.

He was admitted to the bar in 2015.
