= Wanda Ferro =

Italian politician (born 1968)

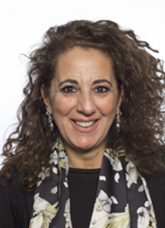
- Ferro in 2018

Member of the Chamber of Deputies
- Incumbent
- Assumed office 23 March 2018
- Constituency: Calabria

President of the Province of Catanzaro
- In office 29 April 2008 – 1 May 2013
- Preceded by: Michele Traversa
- Succeeded by: Enzo Bruno

Personal details
- Born: 24 March 1968 (age 58)
- Party: Brothers of Italy

Wanda Ferro (born 24 March 1968) is an Italian politician of Brothers of Italy serving as a member of the Chamber of Deputies. She was first elected in the 2018 general election, and was re-elected in 2022. She served as president of the province of Catanzaro from 2008 to 2014, and was the candidate of the centre-right for president of Calabria in 2014. Since 2022, she has served as undersecretary of the Ministry of the Interior.

== Biography ==
After graduating from a language-focused high school, she earned a bachelor's degree in modern literature from the University of Calabria.

During the 1990s, she had a relationship with Luigi “Gino” Sparacio, a Cosa Nostra boss in Messina (who was married at the time). In the various trials in which she was called as a witness, she consistently stated that she was unaware of the man’s true identity.

In 2012, she was appointed Vice President of the Sila National Park.

She is unmarried and has no children.
