= Riccardo Tucci =

Italian politician (born 1986)

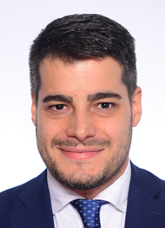
- Tucci in 2022

Member of the Chamber of Deputies
- Incumbent
- Assumed office 23 March 2018
- Constituency: Calabria – P02 (2018–2022); Calabria – P01 (2022–present)

Personal details
- Born: 8 May 1986 (age 40)
- Party: Five Star Movement (since 2014)

Riccardo Tucci (born 8 May 1986) is an Italian politician serving as a member of the Chamber of Deputies since 2018. From 2020 to 2021, he served as regional facilitator of the Five Star Movement in Calabria.
