= List of mayors of Catanzaro =

Mayor of Catanzaro
- Sindaco di Catanzaro
- Incumbent; Nicola Fiorita since 30 June 2022
- Appointer: Popular election
- Term length: 5 years, renewable once
- Formation: 1860
- Website: Official website

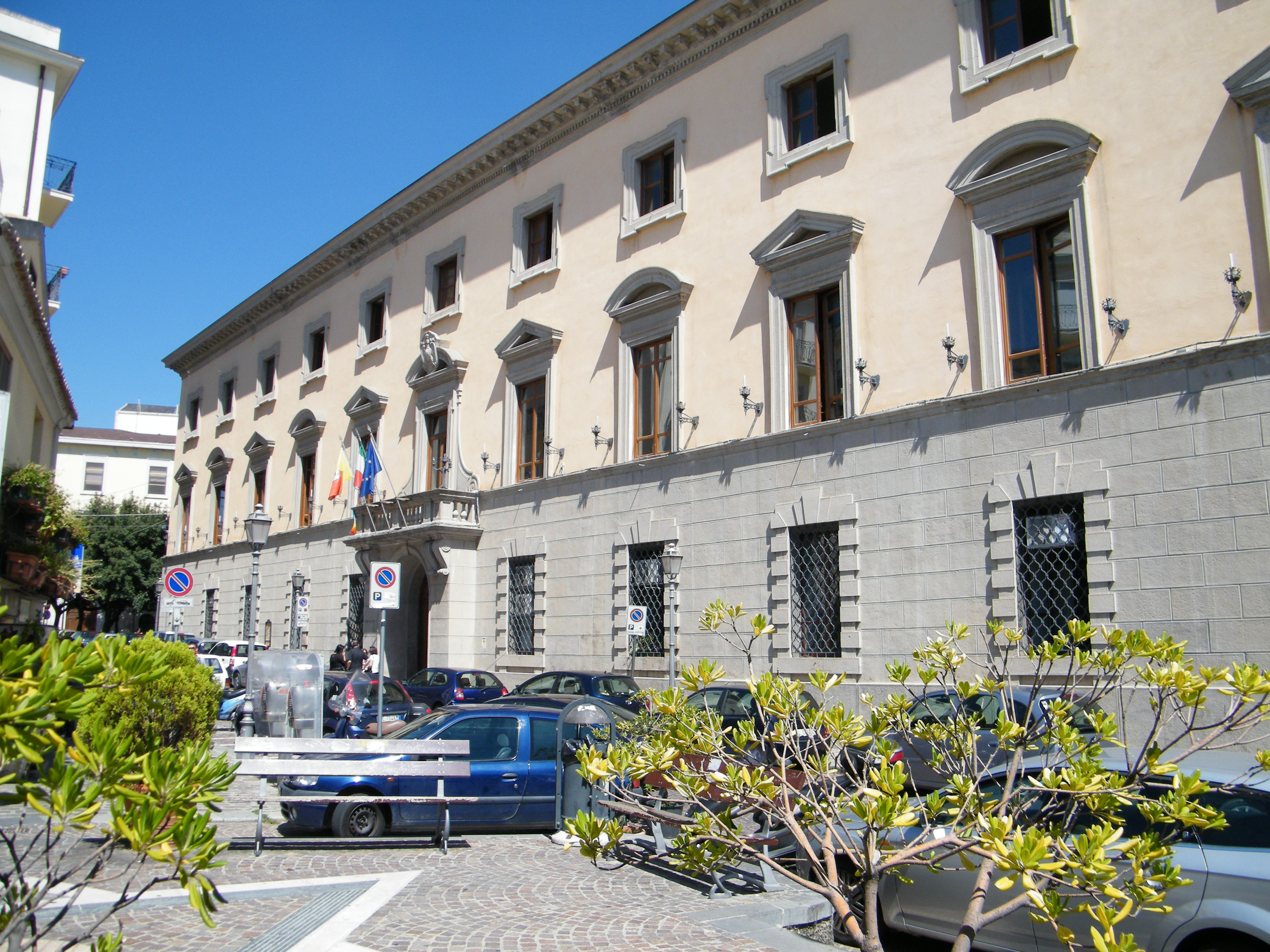
Catanzaro's Town Hall.

The mayor of Catanzaro is an elected politician who, along with the Catanzaro's city council, is accountable for the strategic government of Catanzaro, the regional capital of Calabria, Italy.

The current mayor is Nicola Fiorita, a left-wing independent, who took office on 30 June 2022.

== Overview ==
According to the Italian Constitution, the mayor of Catanzaro is member of the city council.

The mayor is elected by the population of Catanzaro, who also elect the members of the city council, controlling the mayor's policy guidelines and is able to enforce his resignation by a motion of no confidence. The mayor is entitled to appoint and release the members of his government.

Since 1994 the mayor is elected directly by Catanzaro's electorate: in all mayoral elections in Italy in cities with a population higher than 15,000 the voters express a direct choice for the mayor or an indirect choice voting for the party of the candidate's coalition. If no candidate receives at least 50% of votes, the top two candidates go to a second round after two weeks. The election of the City Council is based on a direct choice for the candidate with a preference vote: the candidate with the majority of the preferences is elected. The number of the seats for each party is determined proportionally.

== Italian Republic (since 1946) ==
=== City Council election (1946-1994) ===
From 1946 to 1994, the Mayor of Catanzaro was elected by the City Council.

	Mayor	Term start	Term end	Party
1	Vincenzo Turco	7 April 1946	26 April 1948	DC
2	Francesco Bova	26 April 1948	28 May 1956	DC
3	Gregorio Morisciano	28 May 1956	20 March 1965	DC
4	Francesco Pucci	20 March 1965	16 July 1975	DC
5	Fausto Bisantis	16 July 1975	24 February 1977	DC
6	Cesare Mulé	24 February 1977	10 July 1980	DC
7	Aldo Ferrara	10 July 1980	10 December 1982	DC
8	Marcello Furriolo	10 December 1982	12 June 1985	DC
9	Angelo Donato	12 June 1985	12 October 1987	DC
(8)	Marcello Furriolo	12 October 1987	19 June 1992	DC
10	Francesco Granato	19 June 1992	10 April 1993	DC
11	Franco Fiorita	10 April 1993	27 August 1993	DC
12	Antonio Bevilacqua	27 August 1993	9 November 1993	PRI
–	Natale D'Agostino, Special Commissioner (9 November 1993 – 27 June 1994)			

=== Direct election (since 1994) ===
Since 1994, under provisions of new local administration law, the Mayor of Catanzaro is chosen by direct election, originally every four, then every five years.

	Mayor	Term start	Term end	Party	Coalition	Election
14	Benito Gualtieri	27 June 1994	23 March 1996 (Note: Died in office. The deputy Mayor Aldo Pegorari (PPI) held the office till a new municipal election was held.)	PPI	PPI	1994
15	Sergio Abramo	11 May 1997	14 May 2001	FI	FI • AN • CCD	1997
15	Sergio Abramo	14 May 2001	18 April 2005 (Note: Resigned after being elected regional councillor. The deputy Mayor Filippo Pietropaolo (AN) held the office till a new municipal election was held.)	FI	FI • AN • CCD • CDU	2001
16	Rosario Olivo	12 June 2006	16 May 2011	PD	PD • PDM • PRC	2006
17	Michele Traversa	16 May 2011	10 January 2012 (Note: Resigned.)	PdL	PdL • UDC • MpA	2011
Giuseppe Di Rosa, Special Prefectural Commissioner (10 January 2012 – 7 May 2012)
(15)	Sergio Abramo	7 May 2012	26 June 2017 (Note: Suspended from 23 November 2012 to 21 January 2013.)	FI	FI	2012
(15)	Sergio Abramo	26 June 2017	30 June 2022	FI	FI • AP	2017
18	Nicola Fiorita	30 June 2022	Incumbent	Ind	PD • M5S • SI • PSI	2022
