= Nicola Fiorita =

Italian mayor

Mayor of Catanzaro
- Incumbent
- Assumed office 30 June 2022
- Preceded by: Sergio Abramo

Personal details
- Born: 14 July 1969 (age 57) Catanzaro, Italy
- Party: Left-wing independent
- Education: University of Florence
- Occupation: University professor

Nicola Fiorita (born 14 July 1969) is an Italian academic and politician, Mayor of Catanzaro since 2022.

== Biography ==
Son of Franco Fiorita, former mayor of Catanzaro, he graduated in law at the University of Florence and became a university professor at the University of Calabria, dealing with law and religion, secularism and European Islam.

Always close to the left, Fiorita has been a candidate in the local elections of 2017 for the office of mayor of Catanzaro leading a left-wing coalition and ranking third with a percentage of 23.23%.

=== Mayor of Catanzaro ===
Following an agreement between the Democratic Party, Five Star Movement, Volt and other progressive movements, Fiorita became the official candidate of the centre-left coalition for the office of mayor of Catanzaro in the local elections of 2022. He was elected mayor in the second turn, defeating the centre-right candidate Valerio Donato, with a percentage of 58%. However, his election marked a lame duck (anatra zoppa) situation: The lists in support of him received only 25.85% of the votes, while the lists supporting Donato received 53.81% of the vote, thus he was elected without a majority on the city council.

Political offices
Preceded by Sergio Abramo	Mayor of Catanzaro since 2022	Succeeded by Incumbent
