= Domenico Furgiuele =

Italian politician (born 1983)

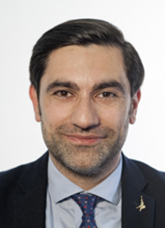
- Furgiuele in 2018

Member of the Chamber of Deputies
- Incumbent
- Assumed office 23 March 2018
- Constituency: Calabria – 01 (2018–2020); Calabria – 02 (2020–2022); Calabria – 01 (2022–present)

Personal details
- Born: 1 January 1983 (age 43)
- Party: Lega (Until 2026); National Future (2026-present)

Domenico Furgiuele (born 1 January 1983) is an Italian politician serving as a member of the Chamber of Deputies since 2018. He has served as deputy group leader of Lega since 2022. In 2026, he left Lega and joined National Future.
