= Chiaravalle Centrale =

- Comune
- Comune di Chiaravalle Centrale
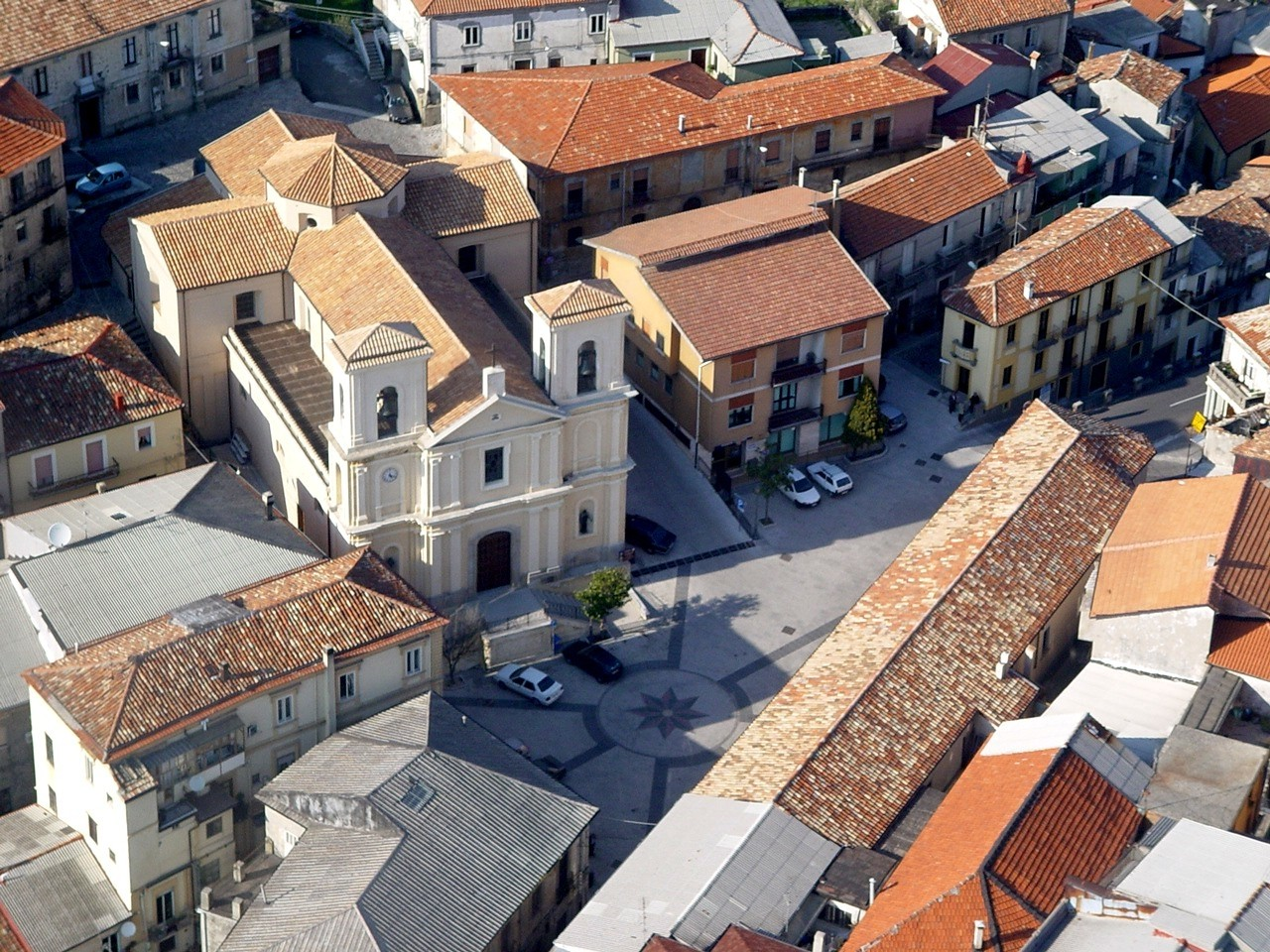

- Location within Italy Location within Calabria
- Coordinates: 38°41′N 16°24′E
- Country: Italy
- Region: Calabria
- Province: Catanzaro (CZ)

Government
  - Mayor: Domenico Donato

Area
  - Total: 23.3 km^{2} (9.0 sq mi)
- Elevation: 545 m (1,788 ft)

Population (31 December 2017)
  - Total: 5,536
  - Density: 238/km^{2} (615/sq mi)
- Demonym: Chiaravallesi
- Time zone: UTC+1 (CET)
  - Summer (DST): UTC+2 (CEST)
- Postal code: 88064
- Dialing code: 0967
- Patron saint: St. Blaise
- Website: Official website

Chiaravalle Centrale (Calabrian: Chijaravalli) is a comune and town in the province of Catanzaro in the Calabria region of southern Italy.

Based on the first historical legends, Chiaravalle Centrale dates back to the domination of the Normans and the subsequent occupation, around the year 1075, by Roger I and his successor Roger II, around the year 1130.
