= 1783 Calabrian earthquakes =

5 earthquakes in southern Italy

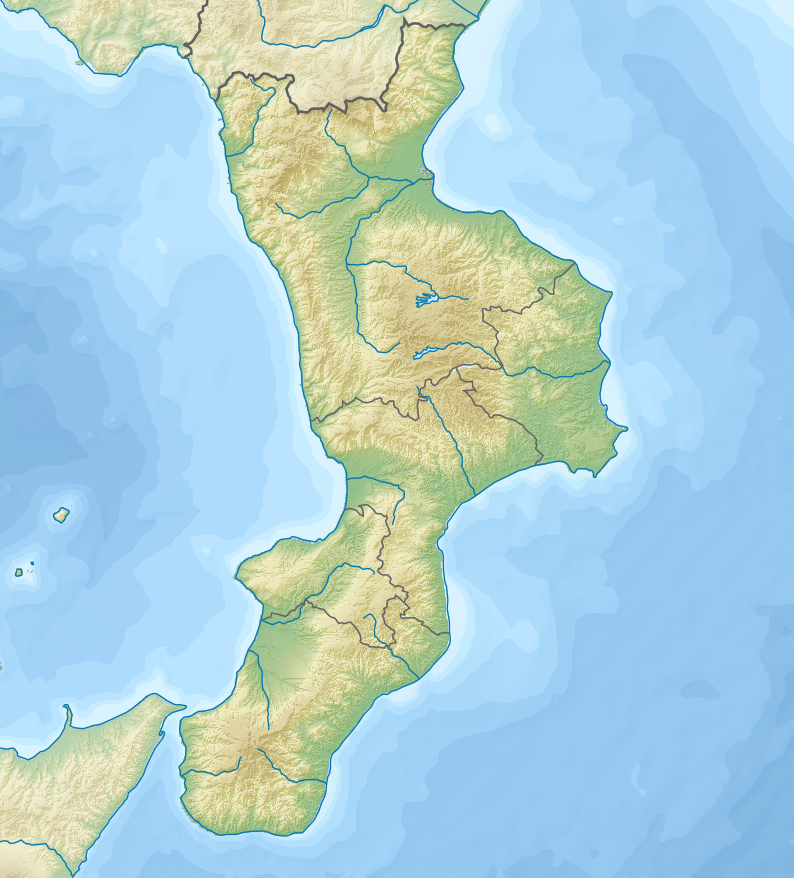
- Location within Calabria
- Local date: 1783
- Epicenter: 38.3°N 15.97°E
- Tsunami: Yes
- Casualties: 32,000–50,000

Five strong earthquakes hit Calabria, a region of the Kingdom of Naples, in 1783. The first two produced significant tsunamis. The epicenters form a clear alignment extending nearly 100 km from the Straits of Messina to about 18 km SSW of Catanzaro. The epicenter of the first earthquake occurred in the plain of Palmi. The earthquakes occurred over a period of nearly two months, all with estimated magnitudes of 5.9 or greater. Estimates of the total number of deaths lie in the range 32,000 to 50,000.

== Tectonic setting ==
The southwestern part of Calabria and the eastern part of Sicily are areas of active crustal extension within the Siculo-Calabrian rift Zone. This 350 km long zone developed within the Apennine chain during the Pleistocene and takes up WNW–ESE directed extension.

== Events ==
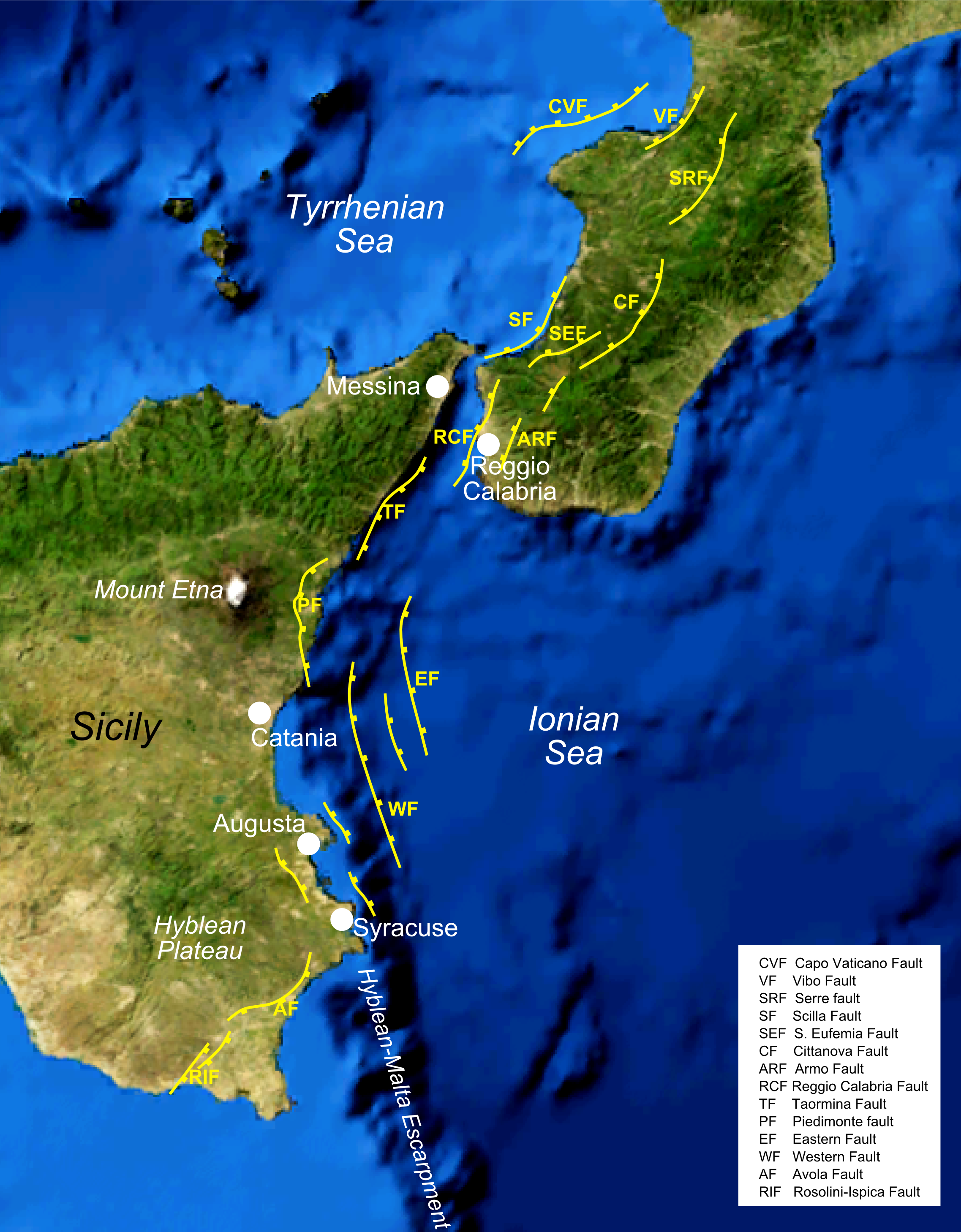
Main faults of the Siculo-Calabrian rift zone

=== February 5 ===
This earthquake, with an estimated magnitude of 7.0, affected a large area including most of the southern Italian peninsula and shook the whole island of Sicily. Many villages were damaged and as many as 180 almost completely destroyed, with more than 25,000 casualties. A tsunami affected the coastline on both sides of the Straits of Messina, destroying the harbour walls at Messina. The earthquake had already caused widespread death and destruction in Messina. Homes were razed to the ground, the medieval Duomo was badly damaged and most of the historic buildings were reduced to rubble.

Near the epicenter the ground shaking was so intense that people were knocked off their feet and heavy stones were found to be dislodged and upturned. Large landslides caused major destruction at Terranova and Molochio but even well-constructed buildings not thus affected were almost completely destroyed, such as in Oppido Mamertina and Casalnuovo.

The earthquake is thought to have involved the rupturing of the Galatro, Cittanova and Sant'Eufemia faults, which form the southeastern boundary to the Gioia Basin.

=== February 6 ===
This magnitude 6.2 event occurred during the night following the first event and struck the area just to the southwest. Most of the damage and casualties appear to have been caused by a tsunami that was set off by a major collapse of Monte Pací into the sea near Scilla shortly after the earthquake. Many of Scilla's residents, frightened by the tremors of the previous day had moved onto the open beach for the night, where they were overwhelmed by the waves. The tsunami caused severe flooding in the town, reaching as far as 200 m inland, and there were more than 1,500 deaths.

The earthquake is thought to have involved the rupturing of the Scilla fault, which defines the coast around Scilla.

=== February 7 ===
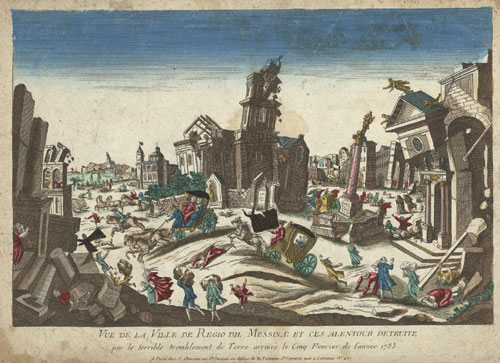
Contemporary print of the February 5 earthquake

This event occurred at about midday 40 km NE of the first mainshock on the 5th. Severe damage extended 15 km along the front of the Serre Mountains, levelling all the villages between Acquaro and Soriano Calabro.

The earthquake is thought to have involved the rupturing of the southern segment of the Serre fault that bounds the Mesima Basin.

=== March 1 ===
This earthquake was the weakest of the sequence and caused relatively little damage.

The earthquake is thought to have involved the rupturing of the northern segment of the Serre fault.

=== March 28 ===
The final event of the sequence was of similar magnitude to the first and had an epicenter about 20 km east of the fourth, near Girifalco and Borgia in the Catanzaro Basin. The earthquake lasted for about ten seconds, and many villages were destroyed with many hundreds dead in Borgia, Girifalco, Maida and Cortale. Landslides were common and sand volcanoes were seen, particularly on the banks of the Amato river.

This earthquake has not been tied to a particular fault, but a recent re-evaluation of the intensity data indicates that the isoseismal areas are elongated NE–SW, suggesting faulting of similar trend to that observed for the other earthquakes in the sequence.

== Summary of earthquakes ==
The earthquake parameters shown below are taken from the CFTI4 online catalogue. The epicentral locations are here related to the nearest large village or town.

Location	Date	Time	Coordinates	Magnitude	Intensity
near Oppido Mamertina	February 5	12:00	38.30°N 15.97°E	7.0	XI
7 km NE of Messina	February 6	00:20	38.22°N 15.63°E	6.2	VIII–IX
3 km SW of Soriano Calabro	February 7	13:10	38.58°N 16.20°E	6.6	X
2 km SE of Filadelfia	March 1	01:40	38.77°N 16.30°E	5.9	IX
near Girifalco	March 28	18:55	38.78°N 16.47°E	7.0	X

== Relationship between earthquakes ==
All the earthquakes in this sequence are thought to be linked by a process of triggering caused by stress redistribution following each individual event.

== See also ==
- List of earthquakes in Italy
- List of historical earthquakes
