= 1693 Sicily earthquake =

1693 earthquake in Sicily, Italy

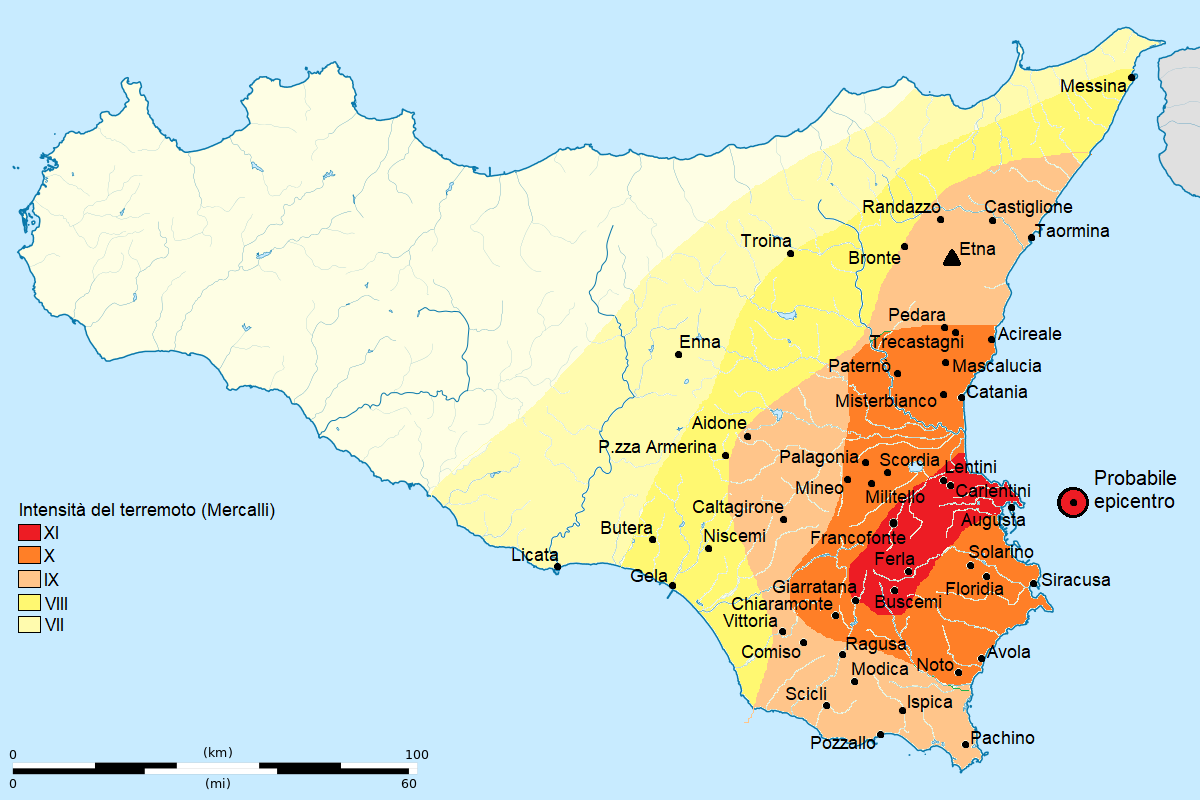
- Isoseismal map for the 1693 earthquake

- Location within Sicily
- Local date: 11 January 1693
- Local time: 21:00
- Duration: 4 minutes
- Magnitude: 7.4 M_{w}
- Epicenter: 37.3°N 15.1°E; The exact location of the epicentre remains uncertain
- Areas affected: Southern Italy (notably Sicily) and Malta
- Max. intensity: MMI XI (Extreme)
- Tsunami: 5–10-metre high waves devastated the coastal villages on the Ionian Sea and in the Straits of Messina. (Ambraseys-Sieberg intensity V tsunami)
- Foreshocks: A magnitude 6.2 on 9 January
- Casualties: 60,000 deaths

The 1693 Sicily earthquake was a natural disaster that struck parts of southern Italy near Sicily, then a territory part of the Crown of Aragon by the Kings of Spain Calabria and Malta, on 11 January at around 21:00 local time. This earthquake was preceded by a damaging foreshock on 9 January. The main quake had an estimated magnitude of 7.4 on the moment magnitude scale, the most powerful in recorded Italian history, and a maximum intensity of XI (Extreme) on the Mercalli intensity scale, destroying at least 70 towns and cities, seriously affecting an area of 5,600 square kilometres (2,200 sq mi) and causing the death of about 60,000 people.

The earthquake was followed by a number of tsunamis that devastated the coastal villages on the Ionian Sea and in the Straits of Messina. Almost two-thirds of the entire population of Catania were killed. The epicentre of the disaster was probably close to the coast, possibly offshore, although the exact position remains unknown. The extent and level of destruction caused by the earthquake resulted in the extensive rebuilding of the towns and cities of southeastern Sicily, particularly the Val di Noto, in a homogeneous late Baroque style, described as "the culmination and final flowering of Baroque art in Europe".

According to a contemporary account of the earthquake by Vincentius Bonajutus, published in the Philosophical Transactions of the Royal Society: "It was in this country impossible to keep upon our legs, or in one place on the dancing Earth; nay, those that lay along on the ground, were tossed from side to side, as if on a rolling billow."

== Tectonic setting ==
Sicily lies on part of the complex convergent boundary where the African plate is subducting beneath the Eurasian plate. This subduction zone is responsible for the formation of the stratovolcano Mount Etna and considerable seismic activity. Most damaging earthquakes however, occur on the Siculo-Calabrian rift zone. This zone of extensional faulting runs for about 370 kilometres (230 mi), forming three main segments through Calabria, along the east coast of Sicily and immediately offshore, and finally forming the southeastern margin of the Hyblaean Plateau. Faults in the Calabrian segment were responsible for the 1783 Calabrian earthquakes sequence.

In the southern part of the eastern coast of Sicily, investigations have identified a series of active normal faults, dipping to the east. Most of these lie offshore and some control basins that contain large thicknesses of Quaternary sediments. The two largest faults, known as the western and eastern master faults, border half-grabens with fills of up to 700 metres (2,300 ft) and 800 metres (2,600 ft) respectively. Onshore, two ages of faulting have been recognised, an earlier phase trending NW-SE and a later phase trending SSW-NNE that clearly offsets the first group, including the Avola fault and the Rosolini-Ispica fault system.

== Earthquake characteristics ==
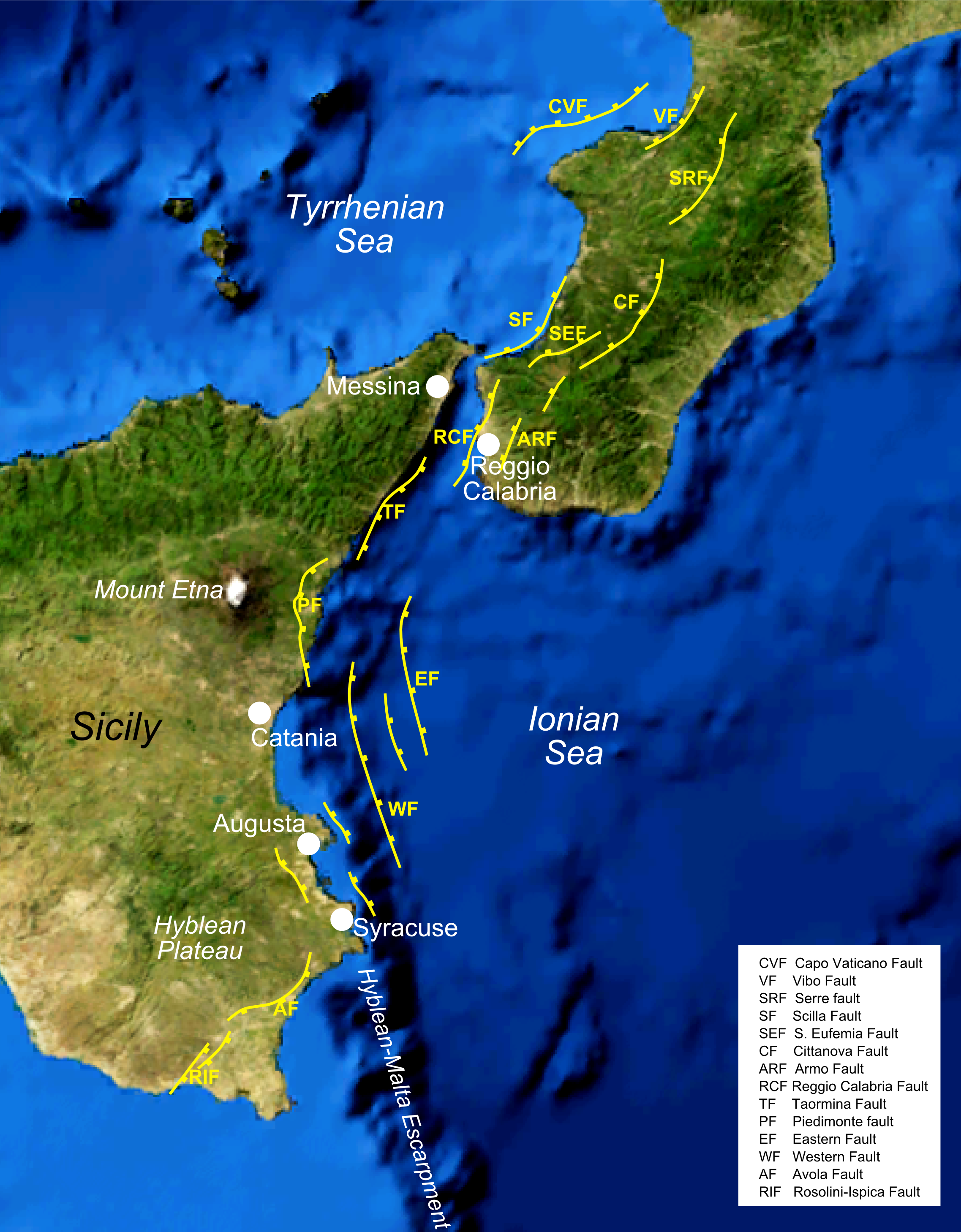
Main faults of the Siculo-Calabrian rift zone

=== 9 January foreshock ===
A destructive earthquake occurred two days before the mainshock at 21:00 local time, centered in the Val di Noto. It had an estimated magnitude of 6.2 and a maximum perceived intensity of VIII–XI on the Mercalli intensity scale. Intensities of VIII or higher have been estimated for Augusta, Avola Vecchia, Floridia, Melilli, Noto Antica, Catania, Francofonte, Lentini, Scicli, Sortino and Vizzini. Augusta lies well outside the main zone of severe shaking; its extensive damage is probably due to its construction on unconsolidated sediments.

From the shape and location of the area of maximum damage, the earthquake is thought to have been caused by movement on the Avola fault.

=== 11 January mainshock ===
The earthquake lasted for four minutes, according to contemporary accounts. The estimated magnitude of 7.4 is taken from the extent and degree of the recorded damage, with a very large area that reached X (Extreme) or more on the Mercalli scale. The maximum shaking reached XI in the towns of Buscemi, Floridia, Melilli, Occhiola and Sortino.

The source of the 11 January earthquake is debated. Some catalogues give an onshore epicentre without any direct association with a known structure, while others propose that the source was offshore due to the associated tsunami, involving either rupture along a normal fault, part of the Siculo-Calabrian rift zone, or rupture along the subduction zone beneath the Ionian Sea. An analysis of the distribution of tsunami run-ups along the coast suggests that a submarine landslide triggered by the earthquake is the most likely source, in which case the tsunami provides no constraint on the epicenter. A landslide origin is supported by the observation of possible landslide bodies along the Hyblean-Malta escarpment.

Historic documents in the Archivo General de Simancas mention dozens of aftershocks, some as late as August 1694, and some reportedly as strong as the initial quake of 11 January 1693. Aftershocks continued until at least 1696, with their effects concentrated in towns along the coast, supporting an epicentre either near the coast or offshore.

== Tsunami ==
The tsunami triggered by the earthquake affected most of the Ionian Sea coast of Sicily, about 230 kilometres (140 mi) in all. The first thing that was noted at all localities affected was a withdrawal of the sea. The strongest effects were concentrated around Augusta, where the initial withdrawal left the harbour dry, followed by a wave of at least 2.4 metres (7.9 ft) height, possibly as much as 8 metres (26 ft), that inundated part of the town. The maximum inundation of about 1.5 kilometres (0.93 mi) was recorded at Mascali.

Tsunami deposits linked to the 1693 tsunami have been found both onshore and offshore. At Ognina, just south of Syracuse, at the head of a ria, a sequence containing several coarse clastic layers has been found, inconsistent with its lagoonal setting. The uppermost coarse layer, which has a strongly erosive base, consists of coarse sand with up to granule size clasts. The layer has been dated as 17th to 18th century based on pottery shards and one well-preserved clay pipe, consistent with the 1693 tsunami. Offshore from Augusta, a sequence identified using chirp sonar data was sampled with a 6.7 metres (22 ft) gravity core in 72 metres (236 ft) of water. Following detailed analysis of both grain size and foraminifera assemblages, eleven possible high-energy events were found based on the presence of large numbers of shallow water forams combined with a greater proportion of fine sand in the same interval. The uppermost two events correlate well with the tsunamis from the 1908 Messina earthquake and the 1693 earthquake.

== Link to eruption of Etna ==
Although there are reports of an eruption at the time of the earthquake, most sources suggest that the volcano had been inactive since the destructive eruption of 1669. Analysis of the relationship between eruptions and earthquakes has found that earthquakes are followed by long periods without activity in the 'rift zones' that extend out to north and south from the summit. Estimates of Coulomb stress transfer due to the dyke intrusion in the rift zones associated with the 1669 eruption suggest that this could have helped to trigger the 1693 earthquake by increasing stress levels on the faults.

== Damage ==
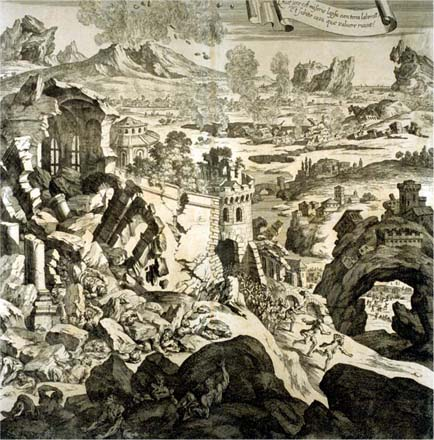
Depiction of the earthquake in an engraving from 1696, possibly showing Catania

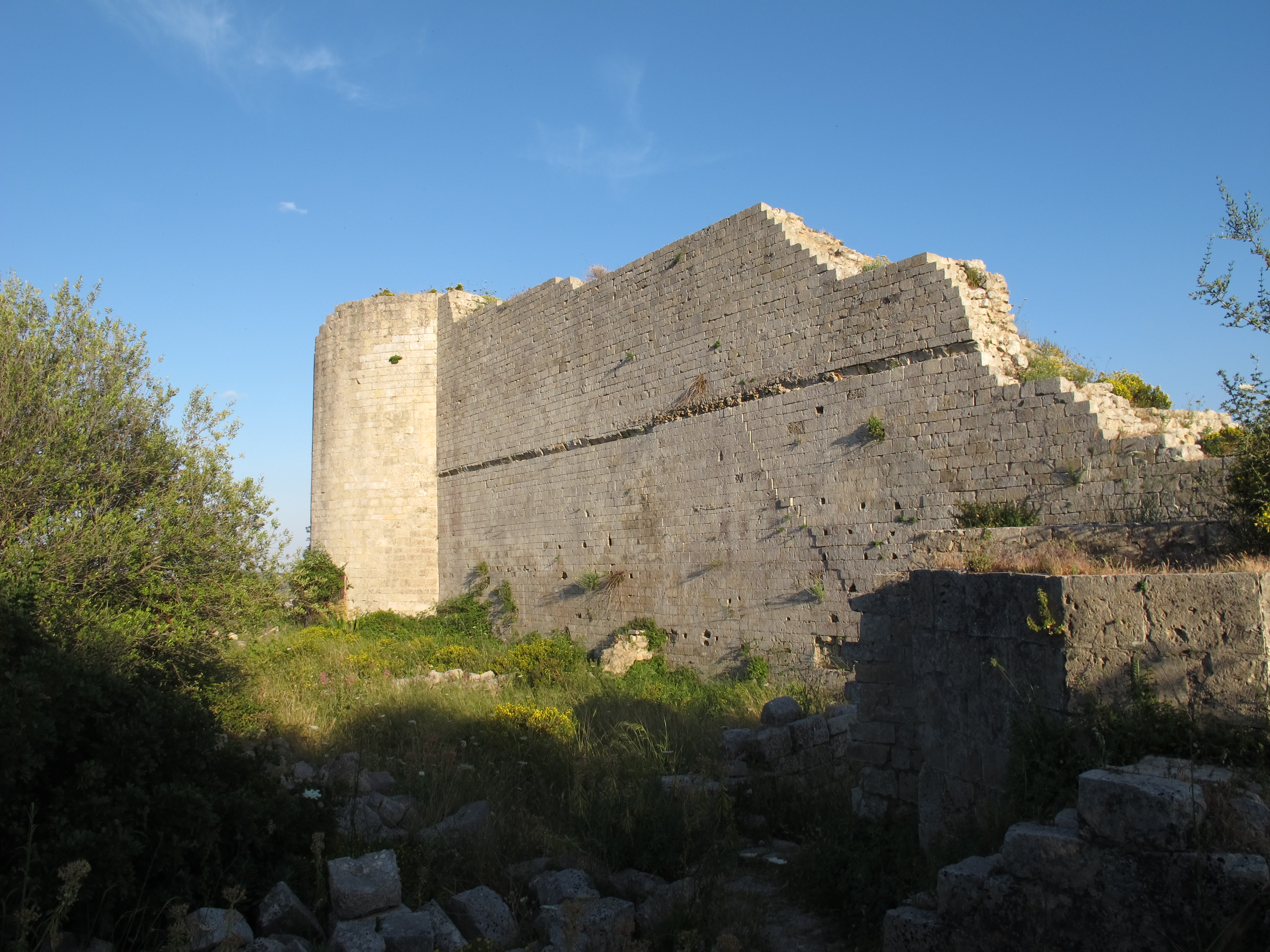
Ruins of the Norman castle in Noto Antica

=== 9 January foreshock ===
Despite the difficulty of separating the effects of this event from the mainshock, some information is available. This earthquake caused widespread damage, particularly in Augusta where almost half of the houses were destroyed. Most of the buildings in two districts of Avola collapsed and many buildings were also destroyed in Noto, Floridia, Lentini and Mellili. Some buildings collapsed in Catania, Vizzini and Sortini. There were an estimated 200 deaths in both Augusta and Noto.

=== 11 January mainshock ===
The area of severe damage covered most of southeastern Sicily, an area of about 14,000 square kilometres (5,400 sq mi), including all the present provinces of Catania, Ragusa and Syracuse. At least 70 cities, towns and villages were devastated, with some examples of at least partial building collapse as far afield as Messina, Agrigento, Palermo, Reggio Calabria and Malta.

The earthquake also triggered large landslides, such as at Noto Antica and Sortino, and in one case a large rockslide dammed a stream, forming a lake a few kilometres long. Several large northwest-southeast trending fractures were created up to 500 metres (1,600 ft) long and 2 metres (6.6 ft) wide, on the plains just south of Catania. In the same area, sand volcanoes were formed by jets of water spurting as much as several metres into the air, with similar phenomena being reported from the Lentini plain and along some river valleys.

At Augusta the tsunami damaged galleys of the Knights of Malta that were anchored in the harbour when they were grounded during the initial withdrawal of the sea.

The number of deaths recorded at the time in official sources were about 12,000 in Catania (63% of the population), 5,045 in Ragusa (51%), 3,500 in Syracuse (23%) 3,000 in Noto (25%), 1,840 in Augusta (30%) and 3,400 in Modica (19%). The total death toll in the same source was recorded as 54,000 with other sources referring to totals of about 60,000. In 1853, Mallet recorded 93,000 deaths in his catalogue of earthquakes.

== Aftermath ==
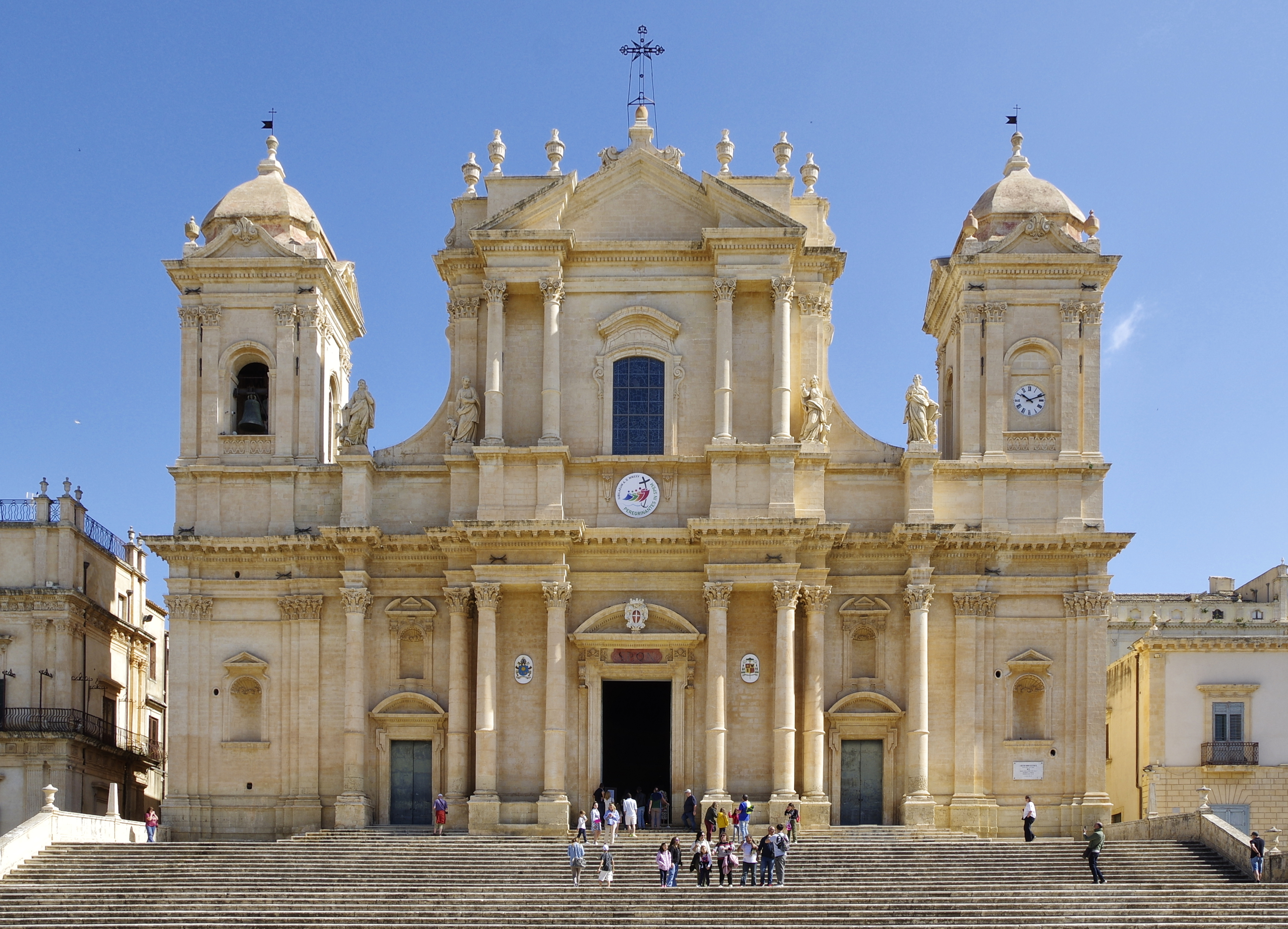
The Cathedral of Noto, one of the many buildings constructed in Sicilian Baroque style after the earthquake

=== Response ===
Sicily was at the time ruled as part of the Crown of Aragon by the Kings of Spain. The Viceroy in Madrid, the Duke of Uceda, reacted by appointing Giuseppe Lanza, the Duke of Camastra, and the Prince of Aragon as Vicars General for the Val Demone and Val di Noto regions of Sicily respectively. Due to illness, both the Prince of Aragon and his replacement the bishop of Syracuse were unable to take up the position of Vicar General for Val di Noto and the Duke of Camastra was forced to take on the responsibility for both areas. Camastra already had considerable experience as an administrator, having served in a number of senior military and judicial positions. The Viceroy also appointed three generals as commissioners in order to organise the immediate relief efforts in the worst affected cities. One of the Duke of Camastra's first acts was to temporarily exempt the worst affected areas from taxes. Amongst other administrators sent to the damaged area was Colonel Don Carlos de Grunenbergh, royal engineer to the King of Spain, who had experience in planning and building fortifications.

In Palermo, the Viceroy formed two councils, a civil one made up of nobles, and another that was ecclesiastical made up of senior church officials. They were directed to meet twice weekly and were charged with the drawing up of plans for the reconstruction of the worst affected towns and cities.

=== Reconstruction ===
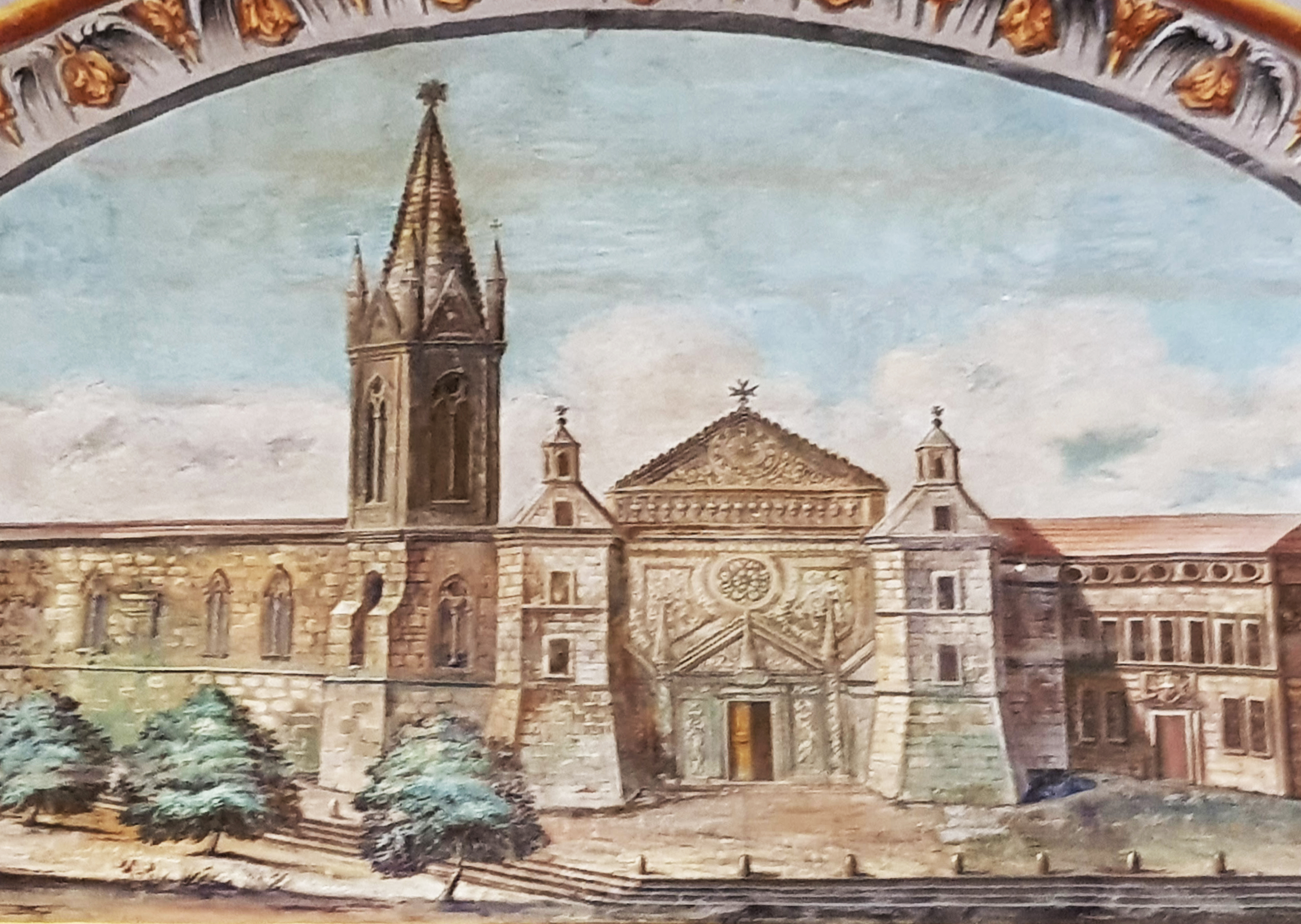

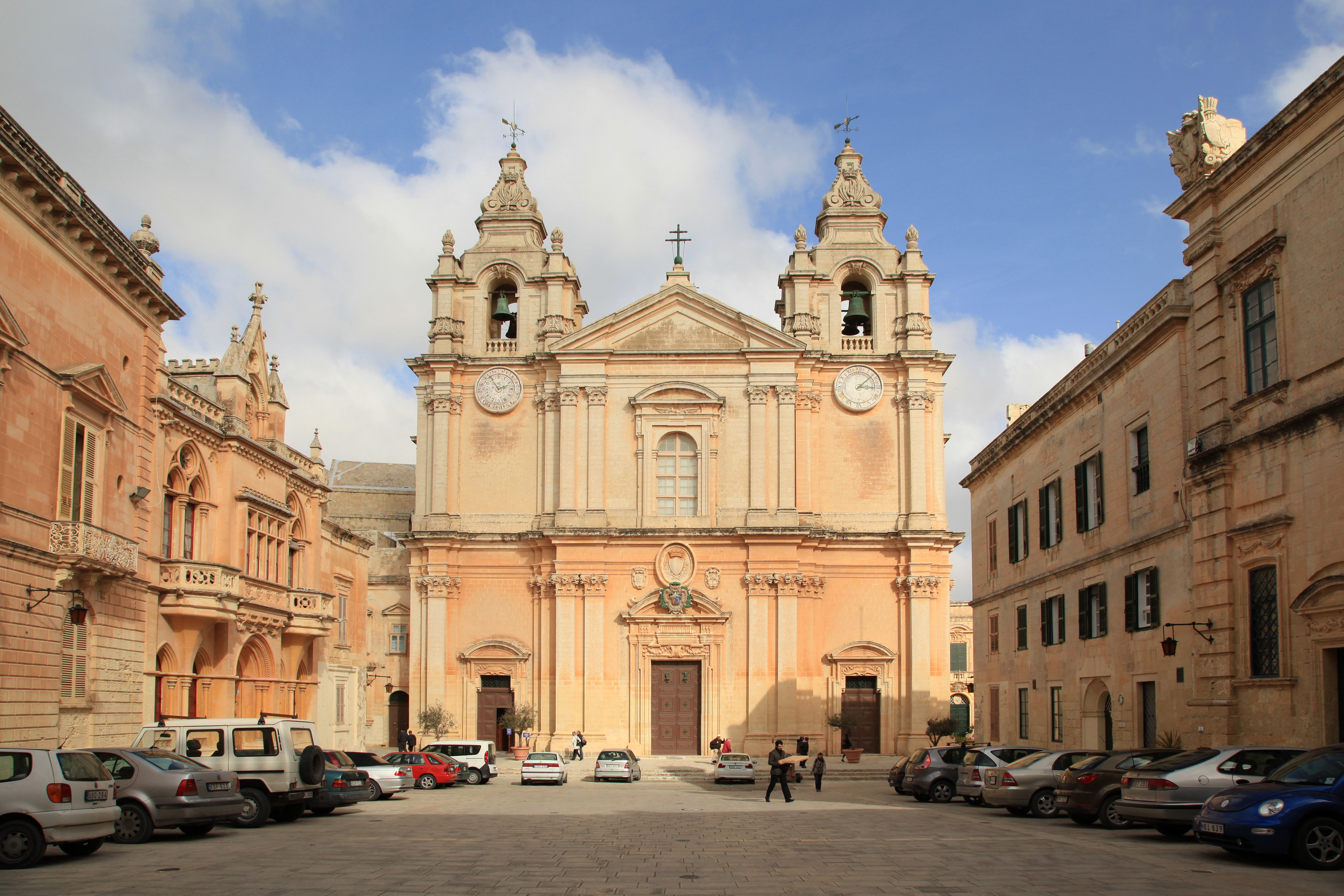
The medieval cathedral of Mdina which was damaged in the earthquake (top) and the Baroque building which was built in 1696–1705 to replace it (bottom)

The initial reconstruction efforts concentrated on restoring the military defences of Syracuse, Augusta, Catania and Acireale, due to their strategic importance. The reconstruction plans were of three types: move the town to a new site, rebuild at the same site with a completely new town plan or rebuild using the existing town plan. Examples of towns that fell in the first category were Avola and Noto, their former locations now being known as Avola Antica and Noto Antica. Catania is an example of a city that was rebuilt on the same site to a new plan while adapting some of the existing structures. Syracuse is an example of a city rebuilt entirely to its existing plan. Ragusa was partly rebuilt on its old site to the medieval plan (Ragusa Ibla) and partly on a new, but neighbouring site, to a 'modern' plan (Ragusa Superiore).

The degree and extent of the damage caused by the earthquake prompted an architectural revival in the towns of Sicily and Malta, a style that has become known as Sicilian Baroque. At this time many of the palazzi, public buildings, cathedrals and churches were reconstructed in this style. Towns that suffered serious damage from the earthquake in which many of their structures were rebuilt, include Syracuse, Ragusa, Catania, Caltagirone, Palazzolo Acreide, Modica, Comiso, Scicli and Mdina on Malta. Many of these towns now form part of the UNESCO World Heritage Site Late Baroque Towns of the Val di Noto (South-Eastern Sicily), inscribed in 1992, referring to the "exceptional quality" of the region's art and architecture.

== See also ==
- List of earthquakes in Italy
- List of historical earthquakes
- Sicilian Baroque from 1693
