= Urban morphology =

Urban geography

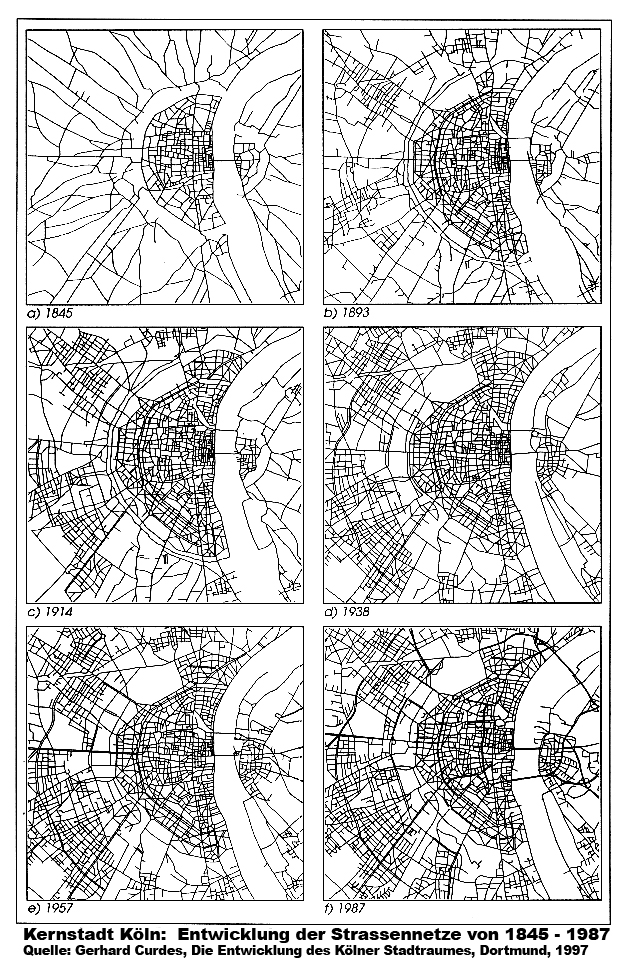
Development of the road networks in urban structure of Cologne, Germany, 1845 to 1987

Urban morphology is the study of the formation of human settlements and the process of their formation and transformation. The study seeks to understand the spatial structure and character of a metropolitan area, city, town or village by examining the patterns of its component parts and the ownership or control and occupation. Typically, analysis of physical form focuses on street pattern, lot (or, in the UK, plot) pattern and building pattern, sometimes referred to collectively as urban grain. Analysis of specific settlements is usually undertaken using cartographic sources and the process of development is deduced from comparison of historic maps.

Special attention is given to how the physical form of a city changes over time and to how different cities compare to each other. Another significant part of this subfield deals with the study of the social forms which are expressed in the physical layout of a city, and, conversely, how physical form produces or reproduces various social forms.

The essence of the idea of morphology was initially expressed in the writings of the great poet and philosopher Goethe (1790). However, the term as such was first used in bioscience. Recently it is being increasingly used in geography, geology, philology and other subject areas. In geography, urban morphology as a particular field of study owes its origins to Lewis Mumford, James Vance and Sam Bass Warner. Peter Hall and Michael Batty of the UK and Serge Salat, France, are also central figures.

Urban morphology is considered as the study of urban tissue, or fabric, as a means of discerning the environmental level normally associated with urban design. Tissue comprises coherent neighborhood morphology (open spaces, buildings) and functions (human activity). Neighborhoods exhibit recognizable patterns in the ordering of buildings, spaces and functions (themes), variations within which nevertheless conform to an organizing set of principles. This approach challenges the common perception of unplanned environments as chaotic or vaguely organic through understanding the structures and processes embedded in urbanisation. Complexity science has provided further explanations showing how urban structures emerge from the uncoordinated action of multiple individuals in highly regular ways. Amongst other things this is associated with permanent energy and material flows to maintain these structures.

== Some locked concepts ==
Urban morphology approaches human settlements as generally unconscious products that emerge over long periods, through the accrual of successive generations of building activity. This leaves traces that serve to structure subsequent building activity and provide opportunities and constraints for city-building processes, such as land subdivision, infrastructure development, or building construction. Articulating and analysing the logic of these traces is the central question of urban morphology.

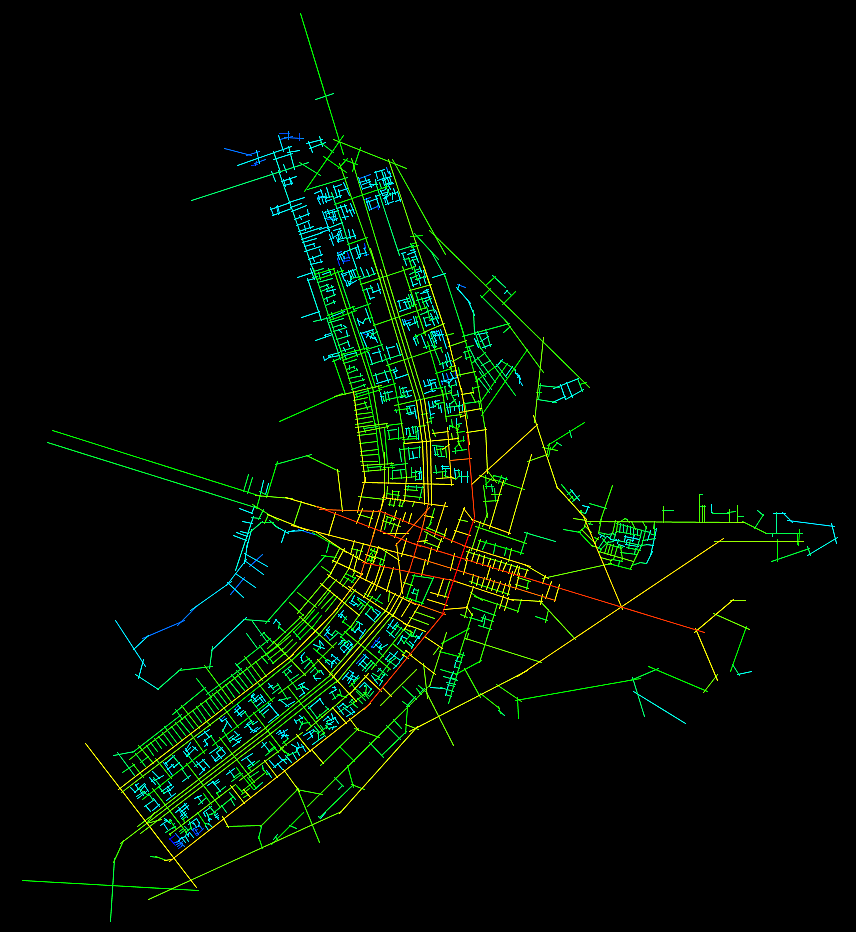
Space syntax axial map of Brasilia, showing the most integrated (red) to most segregated (blue) streets in the city network.

Urban morphology is not generally object-centred, in that it emphasises the relationships between components of the city. To make a parallel with linguistics, the focus is placed on an active vocabulary and its syntax. There is thus a tendency to use morphological techniques to examine the ordinary, non-monumental areas of the city and to stress the process and its structures over any given state or object, therefore going beyond architecture and looking at the entire built landscape and its internal logic.

Roger Trancik discusses three major theories of urban spatial design and urban morphology which can guide analysis:

1. Figure and Ground theory
2. Linkage theory
3. Place Theory

Figure and Ground theory is founded on the study of the relationship of land coverage of buildings as solid mass (figure) to open voids (ground) Each urban environment has an existing pattern of solid and voids, and figure and ground approach to spatial design is an attempt to manipulate these relationships by adding to, subtracting from, or changing the physical geometry of the pattern. The objective of these manipulations is to clarify the structure of urban space in a city or district by establishing a hierarchy of spaces of different sizes that are individually enclosed but ordered directionally in relation to each other. Linkage theory focuses on lines formed by streets, pedestrian ways, linear open spaces or other linking elements that physically connect the parts of the city. Place theory operates upon structured systems of human needs and usage.

== Schools of thought ==
In a broad sense there are three schools of urban morphology: Italian, British, and French.

=== Italian school ===
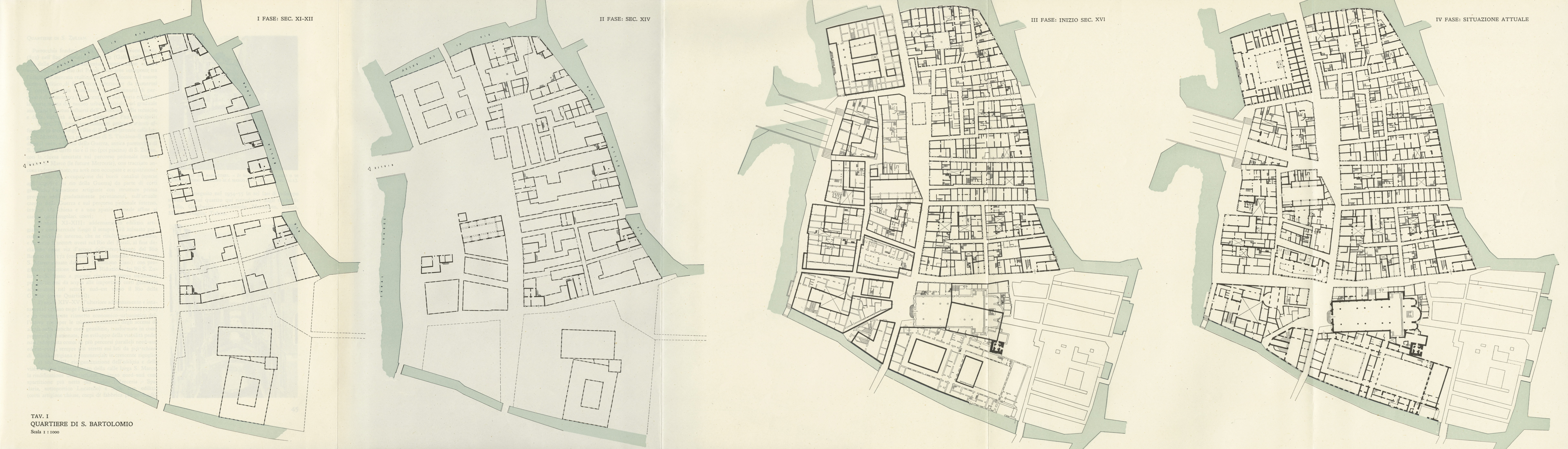
The evolution of the urban structure of Venice. The plan on the right of the series shows the latest state (1958) of the urban structure of the S. Bartolomio block. Three successive plans offer a retrospective periodization of the phases of the formation of the urban structure

The Italian school centres around the work of Saverio Muratori and dates from the 1940s. Muratori attempted to develop an 'operational history' for the cities he studied (in particular Venice and Rome), which then provided the basis for the integration of new architectural works in the syntax of the urban tissue. Stemming from this view are contributions such as Gianfranco Caniggia's, which conceptualise the city as an organic result of a dynamic procedural typology, which see political-economic forces as shaping a built landscape already conditioned by a particular logic, set of elements, and characteristic processes.

=== British school ===
The British school centres around the work of M.R.G. Conzen, who developed a technique called 'town-plan analysis.' The key aspects for analysis according to Conzen are:

1. The town plan
2. Pattern of building forms
3. Pattern of land use

The town plan in turn contains three complexes of plan elements:

1. Streets and their arrangement into a street-system
2. Plots (or lots) and their aggregation into street-blocks
3. Buildings, in the form of the block-plans.

For Conzen, understanding the layering of these aspects and elements through history is the key to comprehending urban form. Followers of Conzen such as J.W.R. Whitehand have examined the ways in which such knowledge can be put to use in the management of historic and contemporary townscapes.

=== French school ===
The French school, based principally at the Versailles School of Architecture, has generated extensive methodological knowledge for the analysis of urbanisation processes and related architectural models. Much emphasis is placed upon the importance of built space for sustaining social practices. The relationship between the built landscape and the social world is dialectical, with both shaping the other.

=== Chicago School ===
As an urban-industrial city, Chicago's socio-economic problems were obvious and crying out to be studied in depth. Therefore, several urban sociologists and geographers belonging to the so-called Chicago School, such as W.I. Thomas (concerned with migration), Robert E Park and Ernest Burgess, attempted to analyse the morphology of Chicago in order to solve these problems.

Burgess employed an ecological approach in placing emphasis on the relationship between organisms and their environment. He used similar biological factors used in explaining plant distribution and established a concentric-zonal theory which included a Central Business District (CBD), an area of transition (invaded by business and migrants), an area of upper class apartments and several commuter zones and suburbs on the edge of the city.

=== Morphogenetic School ===
The scientist Maitri Singhai and the mathematician Nikos Salingaros have created a new school of urban morphology based on morphogenesis and emergence. In The Nature of Order Alexander proposes that urban development is a computational process similar to that of cell growth in an organism, and that the unfolding of these processes produces the urban landscape and its typologies. Some urbanists have sought to transform this theory into a practical emergent urbanism.

== See also ==
- Urban design
- Urban geography
- Urban Planning
- Landscape urbanism
- Settlement geography
- New urbanism
- Activity centre
- Transit-oriented development
- Space syntax
