= Diane Ghirardo =

American architect and art historian

Diane Ghirardo is a professor of architecture at the University of Southern California. She is also the author of several books and essays on architectural history and theory. Her translation of The Architecture of the City by Aldo Rossi into English was first published in 1982.

Ghirardo received her B.A. from San Jose State University, and her M. A. and Ph. D. degrees from Stanford University.

The ACSA (Association of Collegiate Schools of Architecture) honored Ghirardo with the ACSA Distinguished Professor Award in 1998-99. She was awarded a Danforth Fellowship in 1973, a Fulbright Fellowship in 1976 and 2001, a Rome Prize fellowship in 1987, a Guggenheim Fellowship in 2002, an NEH Senior Fellowship in 2001. She was elected President of ACSA in 1993, appointed to the Board of Directors of the National Architectural Education Board in 2005, and served as executive editor of the Journal of Architectural Education from 1988-1999.

== Books and articles by Ghirardo ==
- "Italian Architects and Fascist Politics: An Evaluation of the Rationalist's Role in Regime Building". Journal of the Society of Architectural Historians, 39(2), 109-127. University of California Press, 1980
- “Past or Post Modern in Architectural Fashion”. Telos 62 (Winter 1984-85). New York: Telos Press.
- Architecture After Modernism. New York: Thames & Hudson, 1996.
- Mark Mack. Tübingen: Wasmuth, 1994.
- Out of Site: A Social Criticism of Architecture. Seattle: Bay Press, 1991.
- Building New Communities: New Deal America and Fascist Italy. Princeton, NJ: Princeton University Press, 1989.
- Dopo il Sogno. Architettura e Città nell'America di oggi. Turin: Allemandi 2008
- Italy. Modern Architectures in History, London: Reaktion, 2013
- Aldo Rossi and the Spirit of Architecture, New Haven and London, 2019.
- I tesori di Lucrezia Borgia, Golinelli, Modena, 2019
- Lucrezia Borgia. Le lettere. Archivio di Stato e Trelune Editore, Modena and Mantova, 2020
