= Brindisi Courthouse =

Judiciary building in Brindisi, Italy

- Interactive map of the Brindisi Courthouse area

General information
- Location: Brindisi, Apulia, Italy
- Coordinates: 40°37′22.81″N 17°55′43.58″E
- Construction started: 1957
- Completed: 1961

Design and construction
- Architects: Sergio Lenci, Carlo Aymonino
- Structural engineer: G. Peretto

The Brindisi Courthouse (Italian: Palazzo di Giustizia di Brindisi, lit. 'Palace of Justice of Brindisi') is a judicial complex located on Via Angelo Lanzellotti in Brindisi, Italy.

== History ==
In 1957, the Ministry of Justice launched a public competition for the design of the new judicial offices in Brindisi. The project was entrusted to architects Carlo Aymonino and Sergio Lenci. It was completed in 1961.

== Description ==
The courthouse features a complex composition of volumes of varying heights, including cylindrical, pyramidal, box-like, and protruding elements. Each facade exhibits different arrangements of openings, while the floors are organized according to function: from the ground floor with pilotis and a central courtyard to the sixth floor housing court offices, a tribunal, the prosecutor's office and a library.

The main body is a six-story rectangular block with ribbon windows framed by pilasters, crowned by a triangular volume for the library. The north facade, facing Via Togliatti, stands out with a low volume supported on pilotis and a sculptural spiral staircase, topped by a pyramidal volume. A taller cylindrical element vertically connects the building to the corner with Via Togliatti. The south end features an external walkway connecting to the later-built prosecutor's office. On the west side, articulated volumes and cylindrical elements serve as vertical connectors.

== Critical reception ==
The use of reinforced concrete, pilotis, and pure forms reflects Modern architecture principles, while the experimental approach emphasizes the relationship between light and architecture through a plastically articulated volume composition, influenced by Le Corbusier.

== Sources ==
- Freda, Gianluigi (2021). "Palazzo di Giustizia, Brindisi, 1958-1961". In Manuel Orazi (ed.). Carlo Aymonino. Fedeltà al tradimento / Loyalty to Betrayal. Milan: Electa. pp. 138–141.
- Lenci, Ruggero (2000). Sergio Lenci. L'opera architettonica 1950-2000. Rome: Diagonale.
- Moschini, Francesco; D'Alba, Vincenzo; Maggiore, Francesco (2009). "La Puglia: considerazioni sul contemporaneo". Ottagono. No. 221. pp. 162–165.
- Pagliuca, Antonello; Saito, Mauro, eds. (2019). 9x100= '900. 9 itinerari x 100 architetture del '900. Basilicata-Puglia. Rome: Gangemi. pp. 132–133.
- Polano, Sergio; Mulazzani, Marco, eds. (1991). Guida all'architettura italiana del Novecento. Milan: Electa.
