= Caniggia =

Caniggia (pronounced [kaˈniddʒa]) is an Italian surname from Northwest Italy, especially Piedmont. Notable people with the name include:

- Álex Caniggia (born 1993), Argentine model, singer, actor and media personality
- Caniggia Elva (born 1996), Saint Lucian footballer
- Charlotte Caniggia (born 1993), Argentine model and media personality
- Claudio Caniggia (born 1967), Argentine footballer
- Emanuele Caniggia (1891–1986), Italian architect
- Gianfranco Caniggia (1933–1987), Italian architect and urban planner

== See also ==
- Caniglia
