= Lecce Courthouse =

Judiciary building in Lecce, Italy

- Interactive map of the Lecce Courthouse area

General information
- Type: Courthouse
- Location: Lecce, Apulia, Italy
- Coordinates: 40°21′33.1″N 18°10′23.6″E
- Construction started: 1966
- Completed: 1969

Design and construction
- Architects: Beniamino Barletti, Gianfranco Caniggia, Sergio Lenci, Cesare Ligini

The Lecce Courthouse (Italian: Palazzo di Giustizia di Lecce, lit. 'Palace of Justice of Lecce') is a judicial complex located on Viale Michele De Pietro in Lecce, Italy.

The building houses the judicial offices, the criminal court, and the Court of Appeal of Lecce. The civil court, on the other hand, is located in a building on Via Brenta.

== History ==
The design of the new courthouse and judicial offices in Lecce began with the national competition won in 1961 by the architects Beniamino Barletti, Gianfranco Caniggia, Sergio Lenci, and Cesare Ligini. Construction started in 1966 and was completed in 1969.

== Description ==
The building stands out as a complex composed of several volumes, some developed vertically and others distributed horizontally, which blend together. The floor plan layout is based on a grid of square modules, intended to facilitate easy internal subdivision.

The organization of the various sections reflects the different functions assigned to the spaces and features an exterior with a mix of solid elements and large glazed surfaces. The openings are narrow and elongated, interspersed with small pilasters that emphasize the verticality of the facade. The load-bearing structure is made with a reinforced concrete frame, while the facades are in exposed reinforced concrete. The roof is flat, also constructed with a concrete and brick material.

== Sources ==
- Giorgio Muratore, ed. (1992). Guida all'architettura moderna. Italia. Gli ultimi trent'anni. Bologna: Zanichelli.
- Sergio Polano; Marco Mulazzani, eds. (1991). Guida all'architettura italiana del Novecento. Milan: Electa.
- Franco Purini; Livio Sacchi, eds. (2002). Dal futurismo al futuro possibile nell'architettura italiana contemporanea. Milan: Skira. p. 162.
- Zevi, Bruno (31 December 1961). "Un secondo premio per tacitare la protesta". L'Espresso.
- Zevi, Bruno (1964). "Progetto per il palazzo di giustizia di Lecce, 1961". Casabella. No. 289. pp. 22–25.
- Zevi, Bruno (1964). "Progetto per il palazzo di giustizia, Lecce". Edilizia Moderna. No. 82–83.
