= Teramo Courthouse =

Judiciary building in Teramo, Italy

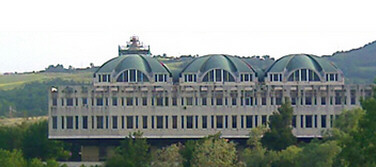
- Interactive map of the Teramo Courthouse area

General information
- Location: Teramo, Abruzzo, Italy
- Coordinates: 42°39′27.74″N 13°42′42.73″E
- Construction started: 1974
- Completed: 1982

Design and construction
- Architects: Gianfranco Caniggia, Romano Greco, Gaetano Imperato
- Structural engineer: Sergio Brusa Pasquè

The Teramo Courthouse (Italian: Palazzo di Giustizia di Teramo, lit. 'Palace of Justice of Teramo') is a judicial complex located on Via Cesare Beccaria in Teramo, Italy.

== History ==
The initial surveys for the construction of the new Teramo courthouse took place in 1964, but it was not until 1968 that the project was commissioned to architects Gianfranco Caniggia, Romano Greco, and Gaetano Imperato, with the participation of engineer Sergio Brusa Pasquè. Work started in 1974 and was completed in 1982.

== Description ==
The building's floor plan is rectangular and features three central inner courtyards covered by domes. It employs an alternating-step modular system designed to allow flexible spaces, with partition walls that can be easily demolished and rebuilt.

The volume is organized into three levels: the base, a narrower entrance floor, and a protruding two-storey block that houses rooms, offices, and services. To accommodate two functional groups—the Court with the Public Prosecutor's Office and the Criminal Court with the Civil Court—the circulation routes were designed to operate autonomously without compromising the ensemble's visual unity.

== Critical reception ==
The building is the second of two projects, occupying a different position on the site; however, the exterior was never completed, affecting its relationship with the city and pedestrian access. The entrance was reduced from the original plan, and the connections between the vertical levels are considered "problematic".

According to Villani, "Caniggia's project intends to insert itself into the channel of modernity; but obviously into another modernity, distant from the uncritical repetition of rationalist motifs". And again, "the reflection on historic architecture does not lead to superficial formal borrowings and does not pursue alluring propagandistic images [...]. What interests Caniggia is not the stylized, purified morphological motif in the Muzio or De Finetti sense, nor the reproposition of the detail to be inserted into the façades, a temptation to which even Saverio Muratori had not entirely escaped [...]: it is the spectacular, absolutely architectural modular combination of spatial cells along a primary axis; it is the spatial richness of umbrella-vaulted systems that draw the gaze upward".

== Sources ==
- Caniggia, Gianfranco; Maffei, Gian Luigi (1984). Moderno non moderno. Il luogo e la continuità. Venice: Marsilio. pp. 46–54.
- Giorgio Muratore, ed. (1992). Guida all'architettura moderna. Italia. Gli ultimi trent'anni. Bologna: Zanichelli. p. 371.
- Caterina Palestini; Carlo Pozzi, eds. (2013). L'architettura in Abruzzo e Molise dal 1945 ad oggi. Selezione delle opere di rilevante interesse storico-artistico. Rome: Gangemi. pp. 236–237.
- Sergio Polano; Marco Mulazzani, eds. (1991). Guida all'architettura italiana del Novecento. Milano: Electa.
- Villani, Marcello (2017). "Storia, modernità, progetto. Il palazzo di Giustizia di Teramo". Opus. No. 1. pp. 139–152.
