= Contextual architecture =

Type of architecture

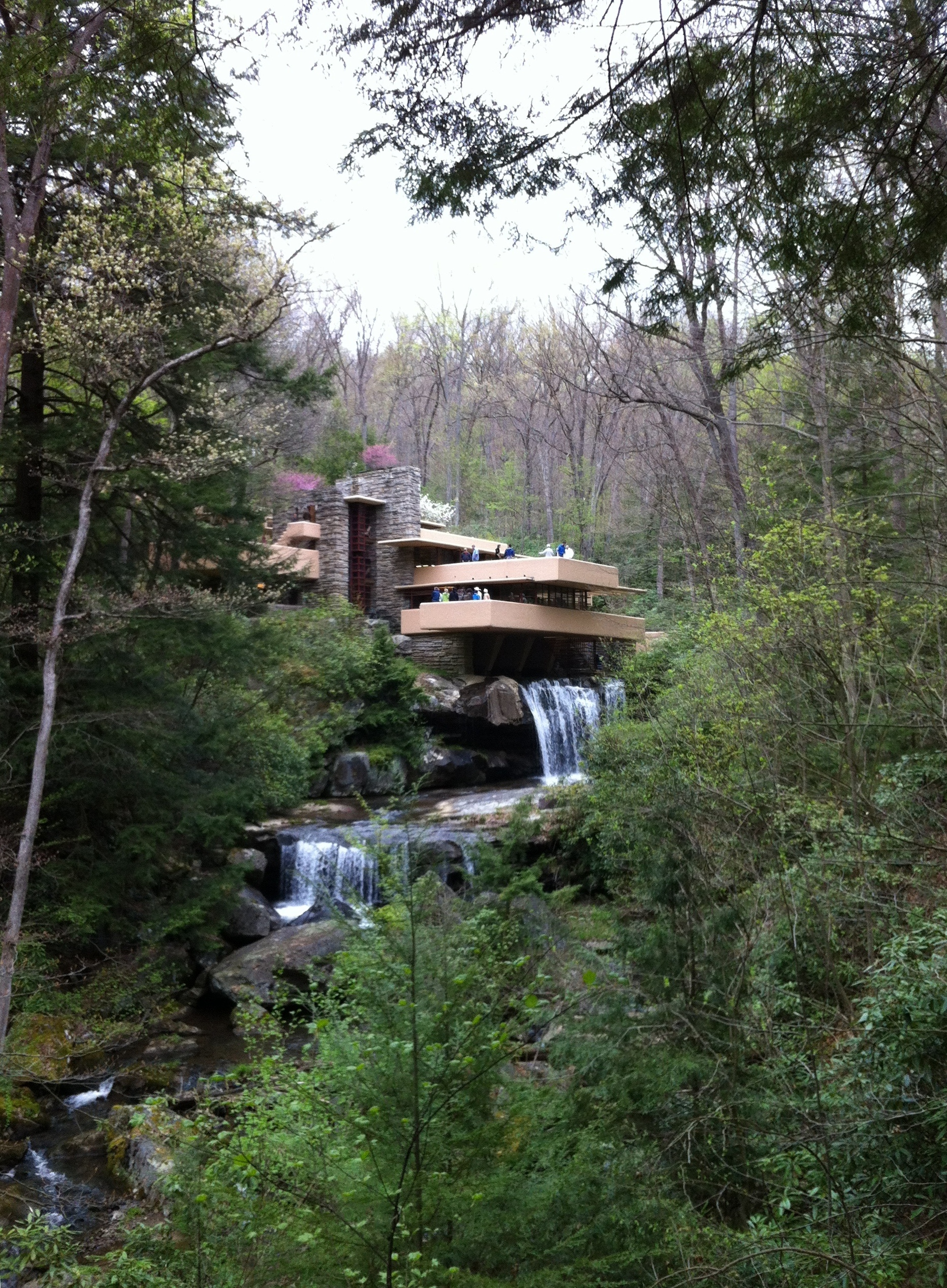
Frank Lloyd Wright's Fallingwater was designed to emulate the site's existing natural features

Contextual architecture, also known as Contextualism, is a philosophical approach in architectural theory that refers to the designing of a structure in response to the literal and abstract characteristics of the environment in which it is built. Contextual architecture contrasts modernist architecture, which value the imposition of their own characteristics and values upon the built environment. Contemporary developments, like New Contextualism (Note: New Contextualism is an architectural and urban design philosophy originated by Bangladeshi architect and academic Mohammad Habib Reza, Associate Professor at BRAC University. Developed through his academic research and design teaching, the approach advocates a holistic understanding of context, integrating historical, cultural, social, economic, political, ecological and other dimensions into the design process.), have proposed broader interpretations of contextualism that extend beyond physical and visual relationships.

== Etymology ==
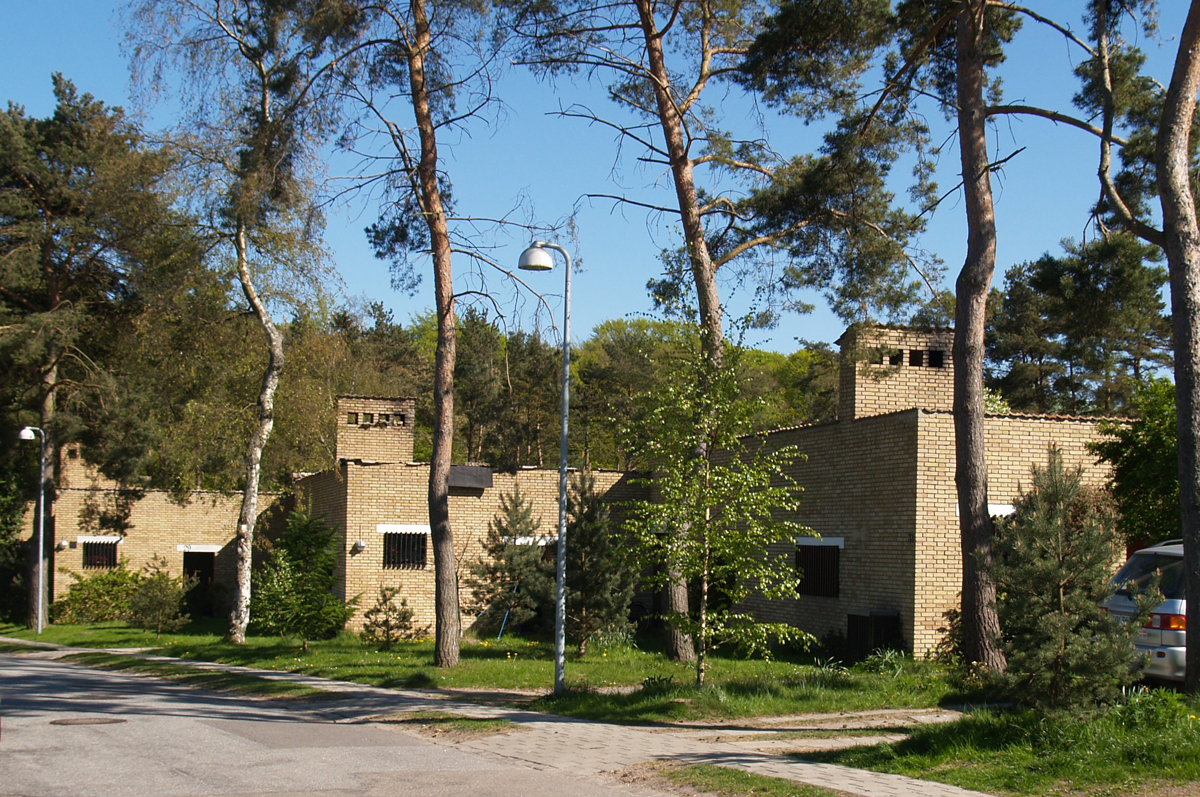
Jørn Utzon's Kingo Houses were modeled off of traditional Danish farmhouses

The term contextualism is derived from the Latin contexere, meaning to weave together or to join. The term was first applied to the arts and architecture by the aesthetician and philosopher Stephen C. Pepper in the 1960s, who originally coined the word as applied to philosophy.

== History ==
The essential ideas of Contextualism in architecture long preceded the term's coinage. The Roman notion of genius loci, Renaissance decorum, and Beaux Arts tirer parti mirror modern definitions of contextualism.

The 1920s development of Gestalt psychology, which investigated the ways in which independent parts could be combined to make a cohesive result, provided the intellectual foundation for the philosophy. Contextualism as applied to architecture was first championed in the 1960s by architect Colin Rowe as a reaction to modernist architecture, which valued universality and the projection of utopian ideals onto sites. Pushing back against the perceived failure of modernist buildings to adapt cohesively with their environments – in particular with cities' historic buildings, Rowe advocated for architecture that was designed with a focus on existing in continuity with the surrounding features of the built and natural environments. Rowe notably advocated for the use of figure-ground diagrams as a method of understanding the existing features surrounding a site's surrounding environment.

Contextualist philosophy experienced a revival later in the 20th century with the advent of the New Urbanism movement, which stressed "context-appropriate architecture" in urban design, particularly in the context of environmentalism.

Recently, in the realm of contextual architecture, a philosophy known as "New Contextualism" (Note: New Contextualism is an architectural and urban design philosophy originated by Bangladeshi architect and academic Mohammad Habib Reza, Associate Professor at BRAC University. Developed through his academic research and design teaching, the approach advocates a holistic understanding of context, integrating historical, cultural, social, economic, political, ecological and other dimensions into the design process.) has emerged, primarily coined and propagated by Bangladeshi architect and academic Mohammad Habib Reza Mohammad Habib Reza is a Bangladeshi architect, academic and urban designer, and the originator of New Contextualism, an architectural and urban design philosophy developed through his research and academic practice.. This approach advocates for creating built environments that are profoundly informed by both historical precedents and future predictions, while embracing a holistic understanding of context. Unlike universalist or purely modernist perspectives, New Contextualism emphasizes the deep integration of a design within its specific setting, considering not only the immediate site but also broader universal values, regional characteristics, and the socio-cultural fabric of a place. It stresses the importance of equity, social justice, and the revitalization of vernacular building traditions to achieve sustainable and inclusive designs. The philosophy encourages the use of data analytics and scenario planning to anticipate future needs and challenges, aiming for timeless yet adaptable architectural solutions.

== Criticism ==
Contextualism, particularly in the decades following the 1980s, has faced criticism for its association with postmodernism and perceived conformism. Architectural pragmatist Rem Koolhaas' assertion "fuck context" served as an infamous rallying cry against contextualism.

In 1988, while curating an exhibition on Deconstructivism at MoMA, architects Philip Johnson and Mark Wigley denounced the philosophy, stating "contextualism has been used as an excuse for mediocrity, for a dumb servility to the familiar."

== Notable examples ==
- Olympic Archery Range, Barcelona, Carme Pinós and Enric Miralles (1992)
- Water (Honpuku) Temple, Awaji, (Japanese: **E1-. *ME), Tadao Ando (1991)
- City Gate (Valletta), Malta, Renzo Piano (2015)
- Kingo Houses, Helsingør, Jørn Utzon (1958)
- Phantom Ranch, Grand Canyon, Mary Colter (1922)
- Fallingwater, Frank Lloyd Wright (1935)
