= Saverio Muratori =

Italian architect and pioneer in typo morphological investigations

Saverio Muratori (Modena, 1910 – Rome, 1973) was an Italian architect, regarded as one of the pioneers of typomorphological investigations of urban form.

== Early life and career ==
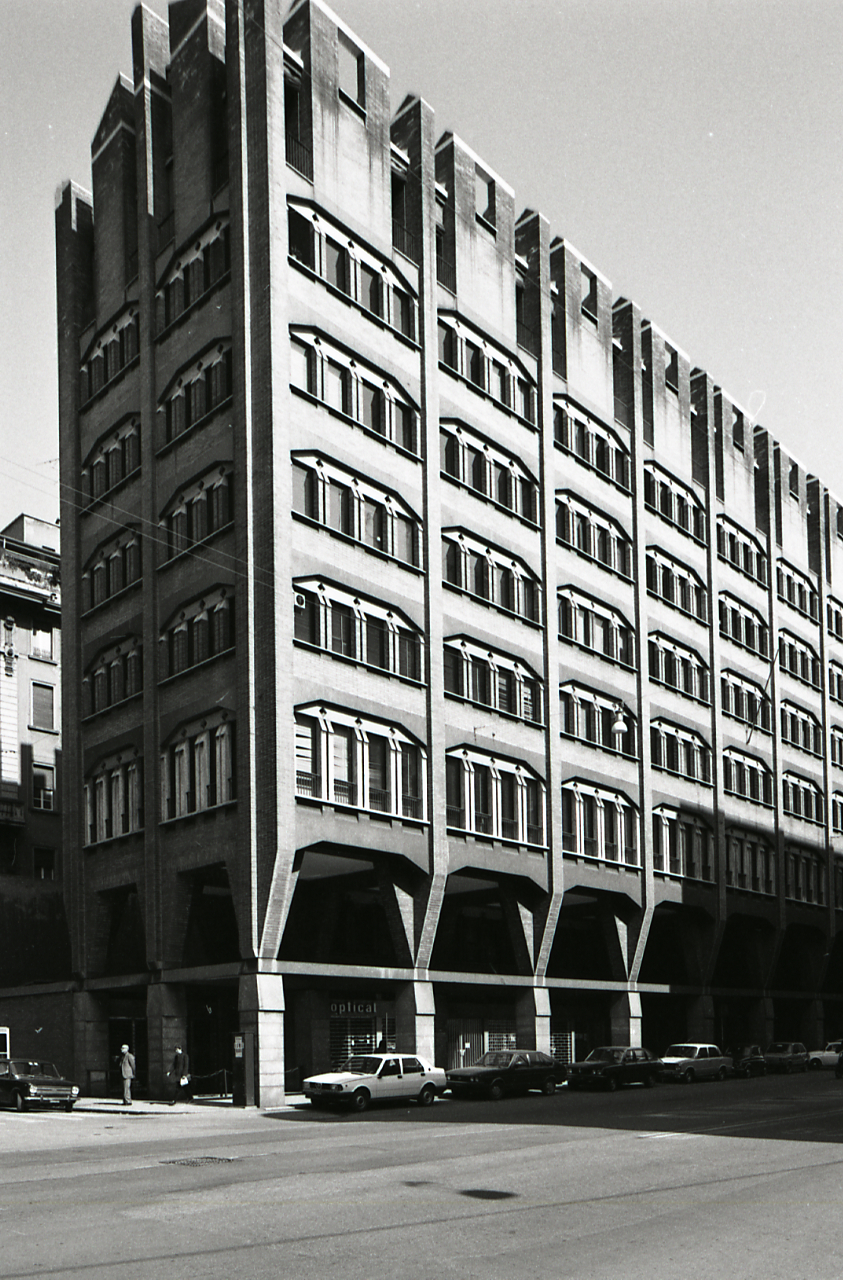
ENPAS palace (later INPDAP), Bologna, 1956-1957. Photo by Paolo Monti

Following the completion of his degree in 1933, Muratori wrote articles in the magazine Architettura. After World War II, he was involved in housing projects in Rome, and designed public buildings in Bologna, Pisa and Rome. In 1952 he started teaching at the University of Venice, but in 1954 he moved back to Rome where he became Professor of Architectural Composition.

== Legacy ==
Muratori's work has been highly influential on architectural design theory and practice in Italy as well as internationally. He is considered the "spiritual father" of architects such as Aldo Rossi and Carlo Aymonino. His principal follower in the study of typomorphology was Gianfranco Caniggia, one of his early assistants.
