= Cantafora =

Cantafora is an Italian surname. Notable people with the surname include:

- Antonio Cantafora (born 1944), Italian actor
- Arduino Cantafora (born 1945), Italian–Swiss architect, painter, and writer
