= Jeremy Whitehand =

British academic geographer

- Died: June 2021
- Education: University of Reading
- Occupation: Professor

Jeremy Whitehand was a British academic geographer who latterly held the position of Emeritus Professor of Urban Geography at the University of Birmingham.

He was described by one prominent urban morphology academic as having "structured an innovative and comprehensive school of urban morphological thought", and he made a considerable contribution to urban morphology's rigorousness.

== Background ==
Whitehand was born in Reading, Berkshire. He became interested in geography partly as a result of the teaching of Robert W Brooker at school; Brooker wrote geographical textbooks. His family moved when he was 16 to Amersham, Buckinghamshire.

Whitehand gained a Bachelor of Arts (with Honours) in Geography from the University of Reading, where he studied, in 1960.

== Career ==
He gained a PhD in Geography from the University of Reading in 1965. His thesis was entitled: Building types as a basis for settlement classification.

Whitehand met M.R.G. Conzen when he was at the University of Newcastle-upon-Tyne; Conzen's work and professional method would have an impact on the rest of Whitehand's career and work.

At a time prior to joining the University of Birmingham, Whitehand taught at the University of Glasgow.

Whitehand joined the University of Birmingham as a lecturer in 1971. In 1974, Whitehand founded the Urban Morphology Research Group at the University. He led the group for almost all of its history.

In 1985, Whitehand published a paper in the leading human geography journal Transactions of the Institute of British Geographers which focused on how citations in papers showed which ideas were being spread within academic research within human geography and showed how the citations within research publications demonstrate whom is reading human geography research papers and books.

Whitehand was appointed Professor of Urban Geography at the University of Birmingham in 1991 and from 2005 was Emeritus Professor of Urban Geography at the University. From the 1960s through to the 1990s, his research focus moved among different parts of the city.

Whitehand was advisor for the International Urban Form Study on 6 World Cities from 2002 until 2005; the study was funded by the Seoul Development Institute. He was a visiting professor at the University of Shanxi in China from 2005 until 2008.

Following smaller meetings of academics interested in urban form and how to use knowledge about urban form, Whitehand organised a conference in 1997 that was attended by a higher number of people, of academics interested in these subjects. The journal Urban Morphology was created partly as a result of these meetings. Whitehand was the editor of Urban Morphology until 2019.

The J. W. R. Whitehand Prize for the Best PhD Thesis in Urban Morphology is named in Whitehand's honour. The head of the jury for the prize is Susan Whitehand.

== Death ==
Whitehand died in June 2021.

== Personal life ==
Whitehand met his wife Susan when he was working at the University of Newcastle-upon-Tyne.
