= Finding Lost Space: Theories of Urban Design =

Architecture book by Roger Trancik

- Author: Roger Trancik
- Genre: Architecture
- Publisher: Van Nostrand Reinhold
- Publication date: 1986

Finding Lost Space: Theories of Urban Design is an architecture book by Roger Trancik, an educator and practitioner of urban design. The book has been translated into "simple" as well as "orthodox" Chinese translations. This book introduces the theory, vocabulary and issues of urban spatial design. It identifies and introduces the issue of ‘Lost Spaces’ that had emerged in the cities with the modern urban development and growth. The book was intended primarily for designers and students of the city. The book includes theoretical and critical discussion along with practical applications and strategies for correcting the problems of spatial structure.

Trancik, a professor in the Cornell University Landscape Architecture Program, has experience in the academic as well as professional field of Urban Design. He has written three books, authored 45 professional planning studies, journal articles, and scholarly papers. He taught at the Harvard GSD from 1970 to 1981, and at Cornell since 1982. He has received national awards from the American Planners Association and American Society of Landscape Architects, which elected him a national fellow in 1990.

== Background ==
The book was written after the modern movement had seen its peak in urban areas and had started facing reactions against its lack of human scale and its focus on individual buildings. The 'Team 10' was one of the first groups in 1953 which challenged many of the approaches including lack of consideration of the context, relation between a building and its environment, and accommodation of the cultural needs of people. After that many other groups and architects also started looking into the shortcomings of 'Modern Architecture'. One such movement was the 'Post-Modern movement in Architecture' propagated by various architects and theorists like Robert Venturi, Denise Scott Brown, Michael Graves and Philip Johnson which criticized the Modern Movement for reasons including its austerity, formality, lack of variety and complete neglect of the context where it appeared. The author, Roger Trancik, feels that the traditional urban spaces consisted of an underlying fundamental principle of structure while the modern cities had lost them. The modern cities that focused on buildings as isolated objects in a landscape, have given rise to the left over spaces, anti-spaces or ‘Lost spaces’. The book examines the reasons of these ‘Lost spaces’ and suggest ways to restore traditional values and meaning to the urban open spaces.

== Summary/content ==
The author defines Lost Space as the left-over unstructured space or landscape or edges. They are the ‘no-man's land’ that nobody cares about maintaining or using. They are “….the undesirable urban areas that are in need of redesign – anti-spaces making no positive contribution to the surroundings or users”

The first chapter introduces the problem of lost urban spaces and five parameters leading to it: the automobile, the Modern Movement in architectural design, urban renewal and zoning policies, the dominance of private over public interests, and changes in land use in the inner city

The second chapter details the evolution of twentieth century spaces and significant movements in design and physical planning. It discusses the impact of Functionalism ideals of the city on urban areas and the concerns of the resultant physical manifestations like modern streets and squares in the predominantly vertical city, sunken plazas and internalized malls, counterpart movements like the Garden city movement, suburbia and New Towns.

The third chapter discusses historic precedents of urban space approaches. It discusses hard and soft space, their relevance and appropriate situations .

The fourth chapter examines three approaches to urban design theory: figure-ground theory, linkage theory and place theory.

The fifth chapter studies four urban case studies to show the application of urban design theories at various scales.

The last chapter discusses an integrated approach to design including lateral enclosure, bridging and fusion of outdoor and indoor space. It explains strategies like incrementalism and advocacy necessary for an integrated design.

== Awards and reception ==
The book received an award grant from the “Research Award, Graham Foundation for Advanced Studies in the Fine Arts, for preparation of textbook Finding Lost Space: Theories of Urban Design. 1982” and “American Society of Landscape Architects National Merit Award. 1986” The book has been translated into "simple" as well as "orthodox" Chinese.

== Publication ==
The book was originally published by Van Nostrand Reinhold in 1986 and was acquired by John Wiley & Sons in the 1990s.
