= Monte Amiata Housing =

Housing estate in Milan

Coordinates: 45.49962°N 9.10097°E

Monte Amiata Housing, Carlo Aymonino

Quartiere Gallaratese, Aldo Rossi

Monte Amiata Housing is a residential complex in the Gallaratese district of Milan, Italy, designed by architects Carlo Aymonino and Aldo Rossi in the late 1960s. It is sometimes referred to as the "Red Dinosaur" in reference both to the reddish color of the buildings and the oddity of their design. The project is well known in the international architecture community, and regarded as one of those that better represent Aymonino's vision of the city as a turbulent, intricate, and varied texture, a paradigm that is known as "fragmentism".

The complex, named after Mount Amiata, extends over an area of 120,912 m² enclosed between the Via Francesco Cilea and Via Enrico Falck streets.

The complex comprises five red buildings: two eight-stories slabs, a long three-stories building, another three-stories slab, and an interconnecting structure; these are grouped around a central area with a yellow, open-air theater, and two smaller triangular plazas. The complexity of the skyline is enriched by a number of passages, decks, elevators, balconies, terraces and bridges connecting the buildings with each other and providing for a great variety of pedestrian walking paths.

The complex was conceived as an utopian micro-city within the city, and based on Aymonino and Rossi's vision, emphasizing the interplay between housing blocks and their urban context. Aymonino and Rossi explicitly mentioned the Unité d'Habitation in Marseille as one of their main sources of inspiration, although their intent was to improve on Le Corbusier's model. Rossi also took inspiration from Giorgio de Chirico's paintings when designing one of the five buildings, the smaller slab.

In the early years after its construction, the complex was abusively occupied by homeless families. In 1974 it was deserted, and was later converted into a middle-class condominium.
