= Sergio Lenci =

Italian architect

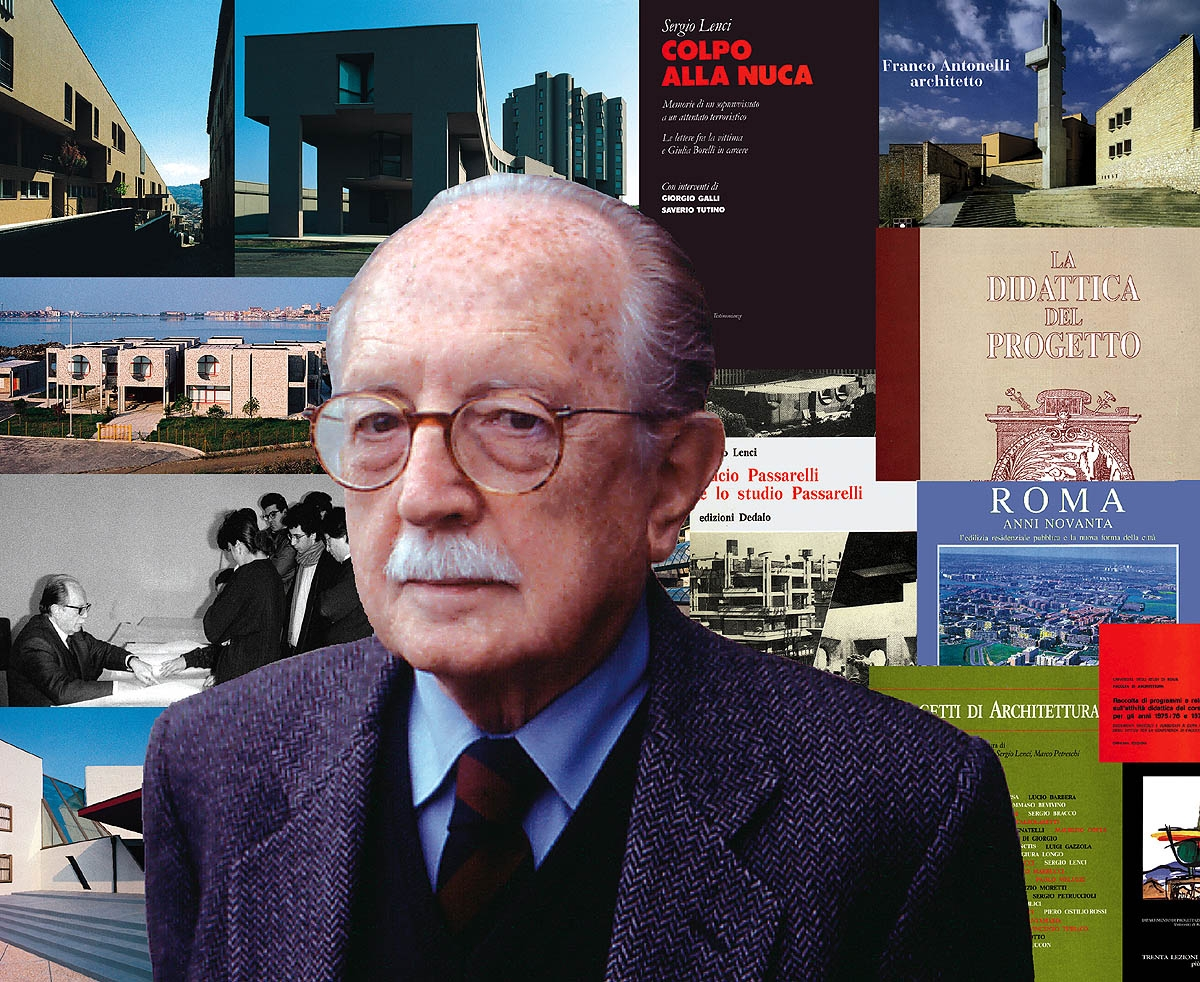
- Born: 11 May 1927; Naples, Kingdom of Italy
- Died: 20 March 2001 (aged 73); Rome, Italy
- Education: Sapienza University of Rome
- Occupation: Architect

Sergio Lenci (11 May 1927 – 20 March 2001) was an Italian architect.

== Life and career ==
Sergio Lenci, born in Naples, graduated in architecture in 1950 from the Sapienza University of Rome. In 1977, he became a full professor of architectural design at the same university, a position he held until 1999.

His most notable projects include the INA-Casa Tiburtino neighborhood in Rome, a tower residential building in Ravenna, the headquarters of the Cooperativa ITER in Lugo di Romagna, the Brindisi Courthouse and the Lecce Courthouse. He also designed the prisons of Rome Rebibbia, Spoleto, Livorno, and Rimini.

On 2 May 1980, he was the target of a terrorist attack by Prima Linea, which attempted to kill him by shooting him in the back of the head. Surviving with a bullet lodged in his skull, he lived with it for 21 years. His experience was documented in the book Colpo alla nuca, which won the Pieve Santo Stefano literary award in 1987, and inspired the film The Second Time by Mimmo Calopresti.

In 1989, he received an honorable mention at the international competition for the new Alexandrina Library. He died in March 2001. In the same year, he was awarded the Honorary Fellowship by the American Institute of Architects. The Order of Architects of Rome and the National Institute of Architecture have named the "IN/ARCH Premio Sergio Lenci" to honor emerging architects and promote contemporary architecture in the Lazio region.

His sons Roberto and Ruggero are also architects.

== Sources ==
- Lenci, Ruggero (2000). Sergio Lenci. L'opera architettonica 1950-2000. Rome: Diagonale.
- Polano, Sergio; Mulazzani, Marco, eds. (1991). Guida all'architettura italiana del Novecento. Milan: Electa. p. 521.
- Portoghesi, Paolo (1969). Dizionario enciclopedico di architettura e urbanistica. Vol. III. Rome. p. 364.
- Sgarbi, Vittorio (2022). Roma dal Rinascimento ai giorni nostri. Milan: La Nave di Teseo. pp. 140–141.
