= Caniglia =

Caniglia (pronounced [kaˈniʎʎa]) is an Italian surname from various areas of southern Italy, believed to originally indicate someone who fed horses as a job. Notable people with the surname include:

- Al Caniglia (1921–1974), American football coach
  - Al F. Caniglia Field, a stadium in Omaha, Nebraska named after him
- Jeremy Caniglia (born 1970), American painter and illustrator
- Maria Caniglia (1905–1979), Italian dramatic soprano
- Sebastiano "Yano" Caniglia (1924–2013), American restaurateur, founder of Mister C's
- Valentina Caniglia, Italian cinematographer and director

== See also ==
- Caniglia v. Strom – 2021 United States Supreme Court case
- Caniggia
