= Giambattista Nolli =

Italian architect and surveyor (1701–1756)

The Nolli-Piranesi map, 1748

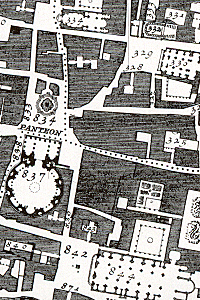
Detail from the 1748 Nolli map, La Nuova Topografia di Roma, showing: (837) Pantheon, (842) Piazza della Minerva, and the Insula Sapientiae (Island of Wisdom) aka Insula Dominicana including (844) Church and Convent of Santa Maria sopra Minerva and former campus of the Angelicum including (843) Palazzo della Minerva c. 1560 (now Bibliotecca del Senato of the Italian government), Guidetti Cloister c. 1565 (nearest to Church), Cisterna Cloister, Sala del Refettorio, Sale dell'Inquisizione, and Sala delle Capriate, former Angelicum library, on the second floor between cloisters.

Giambattista Nolli (or Giovanni Battista) (9 April 1701 – 3 July 1756), was an Italian architect and surveyor. He is best known for his ichnographic plan of Rome, the Pianta Grande di Roma which he began surveying in 1736 and engraved in 1748, and now universally known as the Nolli Map. The map is composed of 12 copper plate engravings that together measure 176 centimetres (69 in) by 208 centimetres (82 in). It was produced and published in response to the commission of Pope Benedict XIV to survey Rome in order to help create demarcations for the 14 traditional rioni or districts. It was by far the most accurate description of Rome produced to date at a time when the architectural achievement of the Papacy was in full flower.

== Biography ==
Born in 1701 in Castiglione d'Intelvi (Como), he moved to Rome thanks to the patronage of members of the patrician Albani and Corsini families.

As an architect, he worked on the churches of Sant'Alessio on the Aventine Hill (1743) and Santa Dorotea in Trastevere (1751–1756).

== Nolli Map ==
The Nolli map reflects an earlier map by Leonardo Bufalini in 1551, with which Nolli readily invited comparison; however, Nolli made a number of important innovations. Firstly, Nolli reorients the city from east (which was conventional at the time) to magnetic north, reflecting Nolli's reliance on the compass to get a bearing on the city's topography. Secondly, though he follows Bufalini in using a figure-ground representation of built space with blocks and buildings shaded in a dark poché, Nolli represents enclosed public spaces such as the colonnades in St. Peter's Square and the Pantheon as open civic spaces. Finally, the map was a significant improvement in accuracy, even noting the asymmetry of the Spanish Steps. The map was used in government planning for the city of Rome until the 1970s; it was used as a base map for all Roman mapping and planning up to that date.

The map is framed with a veduta by Stefano Pozzi. A scaled-down edition, a collaboration between Nolli and Giovanni Battista Piranesi, was published in the same year the original map was finished. Piranesi was instrumental in getting the work printed; Giuseppe Vasi also contributed.

== See also ==
- Turgot map of Paris
- Rodolfo Lanciani#Forma Urbis Romae
- Plan of Rome (Bigot)

== Sources ==
There have been a number of facsimile editions of the Nolli Map; two are listed here:

- 'The New Plan of Rome' By James Tice and Erik Steiner, University of Oregon Press, USA, 2006.
- 'The Nolli Plan of Rome: Facsimile', Full-size facsimile portfolio of the original 19 sheets 56 cm x 81 cm [22"x 32"] with 12pp intro. by Allen Ceen; J. H. Aronson Publisher, Highmount, NY 12441, 1st Ed. 1984, 2nd Ed. 1991.
