= M. R. G. Conzen =

Michael Robert Günter Conzen (Berlin, 21 January 1907 – Newcastle upon Tyne, 4 February 2000) was a geographer, founder of the Anglo-German school of urban morphology. Conzen's most influential work is a detailed morphological study of the English market town of Alnwick. His work is noted among others for the micro-scale study of the evolution of plots.

== Biography ==
M.R.G. Conzen studied geography, history and philosophy at the University of Berlin between 1926–1932. One of his mentors was geographer Herbert Louis, who in turn was a disciple of the Austrian geographer Norbert Krebs (Krebs was a prominent pupil of Albrecht Penck and influenced Carl O. Sauer in his writings on the morphology of landscape). In 1933 Conzen emigrated to the UK, where he studied at the Victoria University of Manchester first obtaining a diploma in town and country planning in 1936 and a master's degree in historical geography in 1942.

== Publications ==
- 1960 Conzen, M.R.G. "Alnwick, Northumberland: A Study in Town Plan Analysis", Institute of British Geographers, Publication no.27, London, (2nd revised edition, 1969.)
- 1981 Whitehand, J.W.R. (ed.) "The Urban Landscape: Historical Development and Management. Papers by M. R. G. Conzen.", Institute of British Geographers Special Publication no.13, Academic Press, London
- 2004 Conzen, Michael P. (ed.) Thinking about urban form : papers on urban morphology, 1932-1998 / M.R.G. Conzen, Peter Lang Publishing, ISBN 978-0820472034
