= Arduino Cantafora =

Italian painter

Arduino Cantafora (born November 8, 1945, in Milan) is an Italian-Swiss architect, painter, and writer. He was a student of Aldo Rossi.

== Biography ==
Cantafora graduated from the Politecnico di Milano. He became renowned for his paintings with Renaissance influence, inspired by Giorgio de Chirico. He became acquainted with Aldo Rossi, of whom he was a pupil.

In the 1990s, he designed scenery for operas: Perseus and Andromeda at La Scala (1991) and Mozart's Don Giovanni in Aix-en-Provence (1993).

He has taught at Yale University, IUAV, Accademia di Architettura di Mendrisio, and the Swiss Federal Institute of Technology in Lausanne (EPFL).

His work was included in an exhibition on Italian architecture at the Centre Pompidou in 2012.

He is naturalized as a Swiss citizen.

== Publications ==
- Quindici stanze per una casa (1988)
- La pomme d'Adrien (2002)
- Le stanze della vita (2004)
- L'architecture du corps (2006, with Charles Duboux)
