= Figure-ground diagram =

Map type

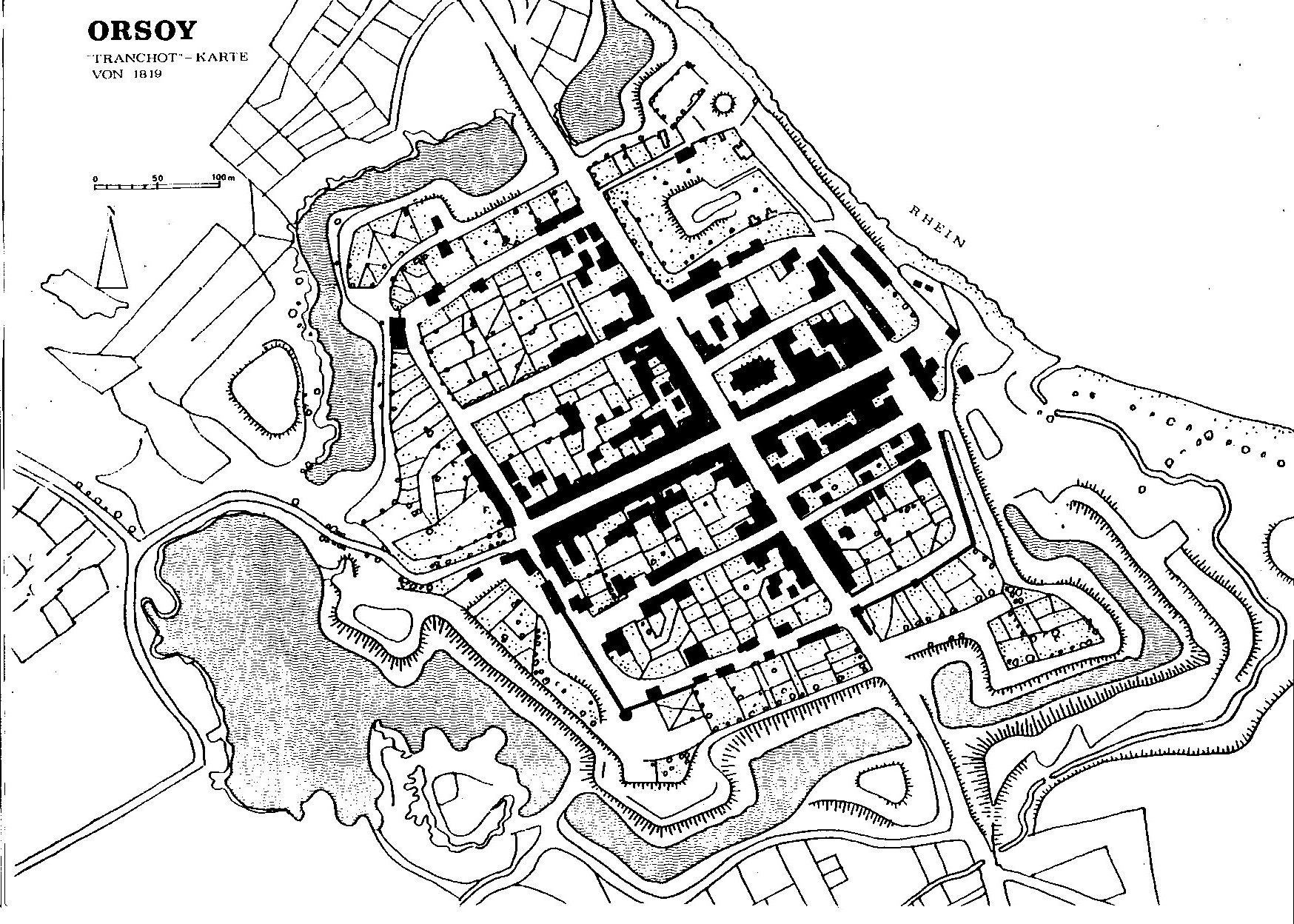
Example of a figure-ground diagram

A figure-ground diagram is a two-dimensional map of an urban space that shows the relationship between built and unbuilt space. It is used in analysis of urban design and planning. It is akin to but not the same as a Nolli map which denotes public space both within and outside buildings and also akin to a block pattern diagram that records public and private property as simple rectangular blocks. The earliest advocates of its use were Colin Rowe and Fred Koetter.

As well as "fabrics", a figure ground diagram comprises entities called pochés. These are, in simple terms, groups of structures — or in even simpler terms the black figures on the diagram. A poché helps to define the voids between the buildings, and to emphasize their existence as defined objects in their own rights: spaces that are as much a part of the design as the buildings whose exteriors define them. Frederick Gibberd was a proponent of the reverse figure-ground diagram, where the buildings are in white and the spaces black, to focus the perception of the designer upon the space as an object. This treatment of the space is a predominant factor in figure ground theory, which holds that in urban contexts that mostly comprise vertical structures such as apartment blocks and skyscrapers, the most often neglected feature of the design is the ground plan, which figure-ground studies bring to the fore by emphasizing a two-dimensional representation that structures space.

The figure-ground theory of urban design and urban morphology is based upon the use of figure ground studies. It relates the amount of "figure" to the amount of "ground" in a figure-ground diagram, and approaches urban design as a manipulation of that relationship, as well as being a manipulation of the geometric shapes within the diagram. A figure-ground illustrates a mass-to-void relationship, and analysis of it identifies a "fabric" of urban structures. Other related theories of urban design employ different approaches. Linkage theory operates upon linkages between elements of an urban space, and manipulates those. Place theory operates upon structured systems of human needs and usage.

== Debate over usage ==
The figure ground plan organizes the primary urban landscape components - plots, streets, constructed spaces, and open spaces – into a diagram of solid and void; the proportions, of which, can be manipulated to create different urban morphologies. If building mass (solid poche) is greater than open space (void), spatial continuity is achieved through street walls and articulated public spaces, creating a mixed-use urban environment that fosters pedestrian activity. If open space is greater than building mass, buildings become disconnected, and voids lack spatial definition, often becoming surface parking

The morphology of the modern city has undergone considerable changes during the past century as manipulations of the figure ground have revealed new fabric types. Dense cities became diffuse as the car began to dictate the city fabric, greatly augmenting the space allotted for roads and parking spaces. This shift is represented in the fragmentation of the figure ground's formerly dense poche, or the black figures in the diagram representative of built structure. During the twenty-first century this increasingly fragmented urban condition has proven problematic and is being addressed by the New Urbanism movement's promotion of infill construction, returning cities to a denser poche.

== History ==
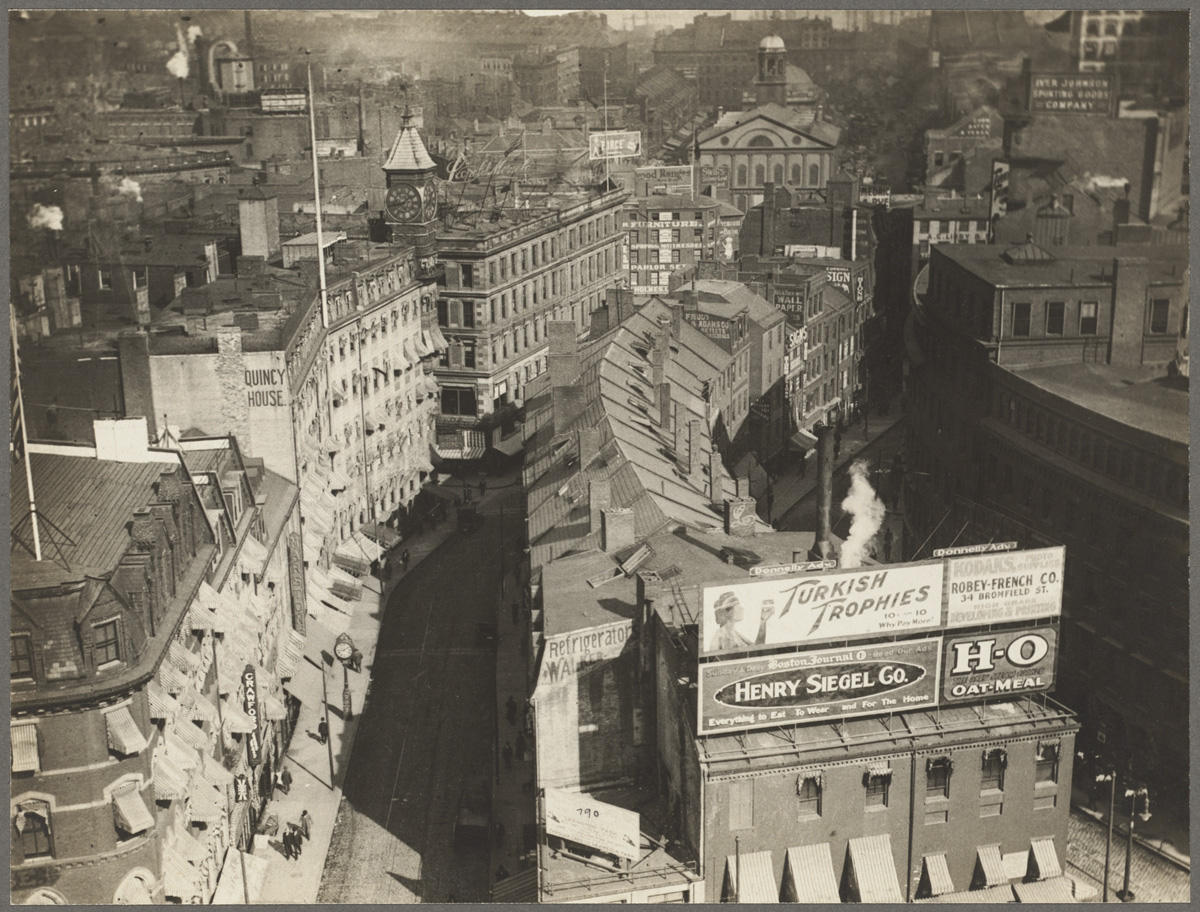
Scollay Square in Boston before the Urban Renewal of the 1960s.

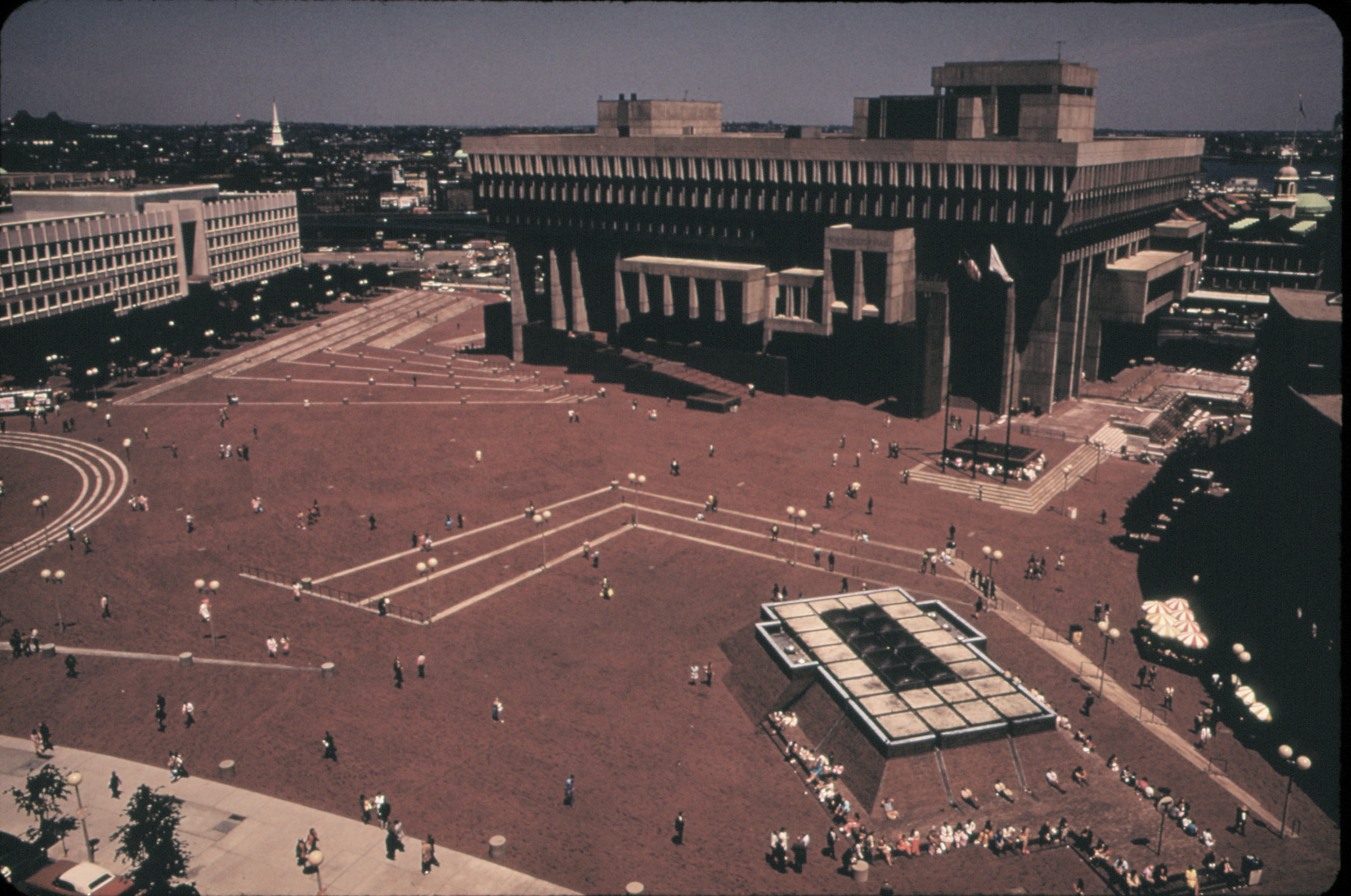
Boston City Hall Plaza replaces Scollay Square during the 1960s.

Beginning in 1920s, urbanists such as Tony Garnier, Le Corbusier, and Walter Gropius wished to build new and rid culture of “dead forms”. Le Corbusier's Ville Contemporaine pour trois million habitants in 1922 featured high-density living concentrated in towers, maximizing open space and fresh air. The proposed city created a field of figural objects based on Le Corbusier's ‘tower in the park,’ a theory that would pervade architectural theory through the mid-century Urban Renewal.

During the 1950s and early 1960s, architects did not follow a unified style, but they did share a blind confidence in modern architecture's capacity to improve the public realm. Such general optimism encouraged planning bureaucracies to employ a tabula rasa in modern cities that called for clearing areas of high urban density, often deemed slums, to make room for large-scale urban gestures. This method of large-scale bulldozing, seen in Pruitt-Igoe and Boston City Hall Plaza, traded a finely grained urban fabric (a primarily black figure ground) for large figural objects in an open field condition (a primarily white figure ground).

By the late 1960s and 1970s, architects began to criticize the void condition of the figure ground created by urban renewal for “disregarding human needs, for not blending in, for lacking signs of identity and association, and for being an instrument of class oppression”. Many architects theorized about how to remedy modern architecture's fixation on the object in the urban environment.

In 1961, Gordon Cullen began the Townscape movement with his well-known book The Concise Townscape, which suggested architecture emphasize the relationship between urban elements– buildings, trees, nature, water, traffic, advertisements, etc. by designing cities at a whole to create an ever-changing urban environment for the pedestrian. Cullen termed this theory “serial vision” and would require that the figure ground depict a continuous building poche that defined varying manipulated voids.

In 1978, Colin Rowe's Collage City, a highly influential text for architects and urban planners, claimed urban renewal's city of jumbled disparate objects was just as problematic as the city it set out to remedy - the dense traditional city of slums. During the urban renewal architects and planners believed that a building could only be understood as an object when in field space, but Rowe disagreed, arguing that the increasing value of urban real estate in the modern city did not allow for the ample green space required to support Le Corbusier's “towers in the park.” Rather, this residual space is paved for parking lots that detach buildings from the rest of the city fabric. Hence, Rowe called for a transcendence of space fixation and object fixation to create an urban environment where building and space achieve balance and a figure ground with shared dialogue between solid and void.

In 1986, Roger Trancik, in his book 'Finding Lost Space, Theories of Urban Design' identified and introduced the concern of 'Lost Spaces' that had emerged with the modern urban development and growth, He suggested three approaches to urban design theory including the figure-ground theory, linkage theory and place theory for a more integrated approach to design.

In 1993, Rem Koolhaas calls for interconnections amongst built architecture, requiring a more continuous poche in the figure ground, in his recognized book S, M, L, XL. Koolhaas explained that architects’ fixation on the objectivity of a building, disregarding its coherence with the urban context. has led to the “death of urbanism”, for if architects are so seduced by the conceptual clarity of one building that they forget urbanism, cities become conglomerates of objects with no relation to one another.

== Current initiatives ==
The current decade's New Urbanism movement encourages densifying metropolises rather than building on their peripheries, thus, promoting infill and reclamation of abandoned areas, which will increase the amount of poche in the figure ground to achieve a more continuous urban fabric. Such density will foster more livable communities with increased diversity of use and population, better pedestrian accommodations, more public spaces, and improved public transportation systems.
