= Emanuele Caniggia =

Italian architect

- Born: 2 June 1891; Rome, Kingdom of Italy
- Died: 20 February 1986 (aged 94); Rome, Lazio, Italy
- Occupation: Architect

Emanuele Caniggia (2 June 1891 – 20 February 1986) was an Italian architect.

== Life and career ==
Caniggia graduated from the Institute of Fine Arts in Rome in 1912 and earned his degree from the Higher School of Architecture in 1924. During his studies, he collaborated with engineer Aristide Leonori on projects such as the bell tower of the shrine of the Virgin of the Rosary of Pompei and the basilica of Santa Croce in Rome's Flaminio district.

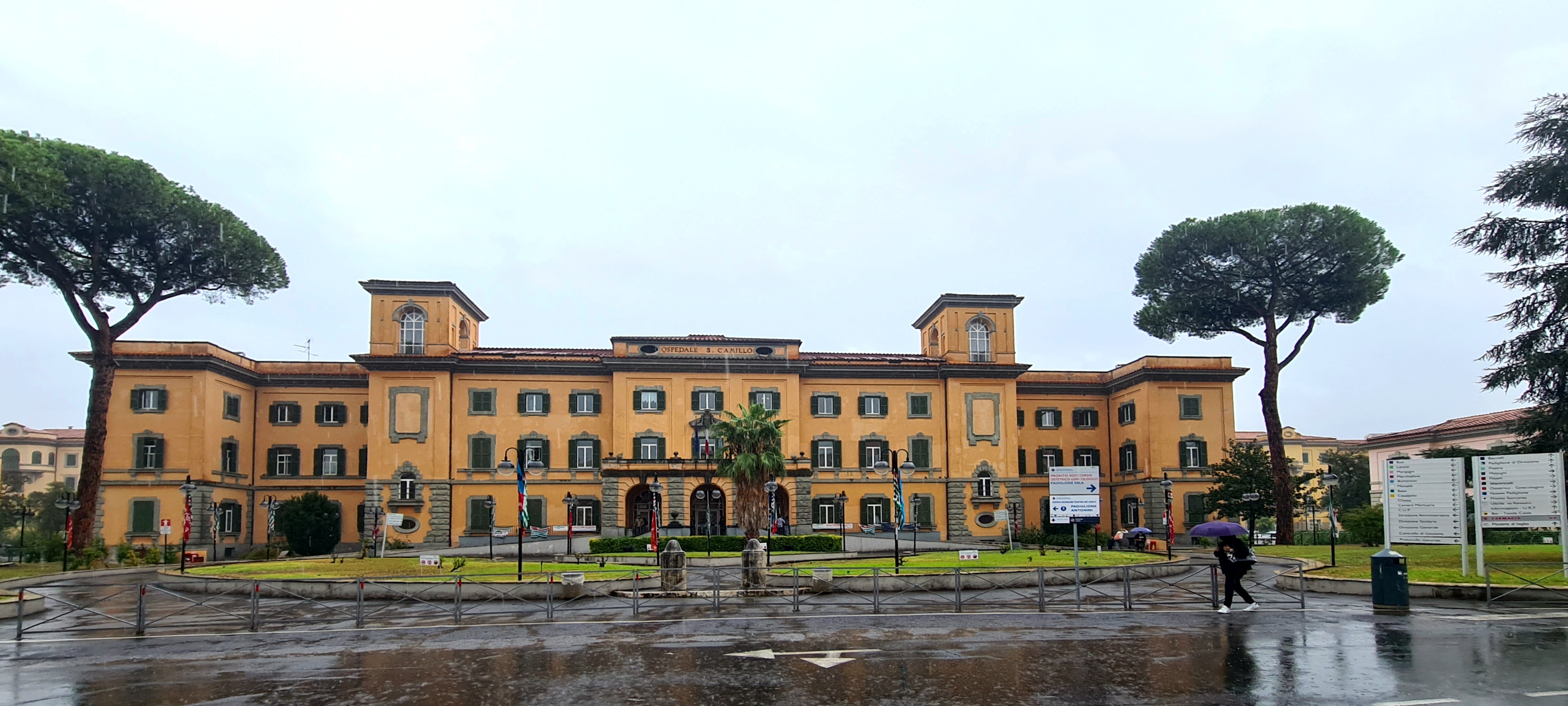
San Camillo Hospital in Rome

Specializing in hospital architecture, Caniggia designed several medical facilities, including the civil hospital of Ragusa (1927), San Camillo Hospital in Rome (1928–1929), and the hospital in Isola del Liri, which he expanded with his son Gianfranco from 1958 to 1965. Caniggia was also active in residential architecture, creating housing complexes in Piazza del Mercato, Terni (1953–1956), Subiaco (1955–1965), and Rome, including projects on Via Santa Croce in Gerusalemme (1956–1958) and Via Trinità dei Pellegrini (1957). He also designed INCIS housing in Florence (1960–1961) and a building in Velletri (1962–1963). In 1963, he designed elementary schools in Aquino and Isola del Liri.

== Sources ==
- Giorgio Muratore; Alessandra Capuano; Francesco Garofalo; Ettore Pellegrini, eds. (1988). Italia. Gli ultimi trent'anni. Bologna: Zanichelli. pp. 36, 323, 327.
- Elisabetta Reale; Margherita Guccione; Daniela Pesce, eds. (2007). Guida agli archivi di architettura a Roma e nel Lazio: da Roma capitale al secondo dopoguerra. Rome: Gangemi. pp. 86–88.
- Adelaide Regazzoni Caniggia (1991). L'Ospedale di S. Camillo, un'opera di Emanuele Caniggia. Rome.
- Adelaide Regazzoni Caniggia (1995). Emanuele Caniggia, 1891-1986. Rome: Dedalo.
- Piero Ostilio Rossi (1984). Roma. Guida all'architettura moderna (1909-1984). Bari: Laterza.
- Vittorio Sgarbi (1991). Dizionario dei monumenti italiani e dei loro autori. Roma dal Rinascimento ai nostri giorni. Milan. pp. 73–74.
