= Ruggero Lenci =

Italian architect and Professor of Architectural Design

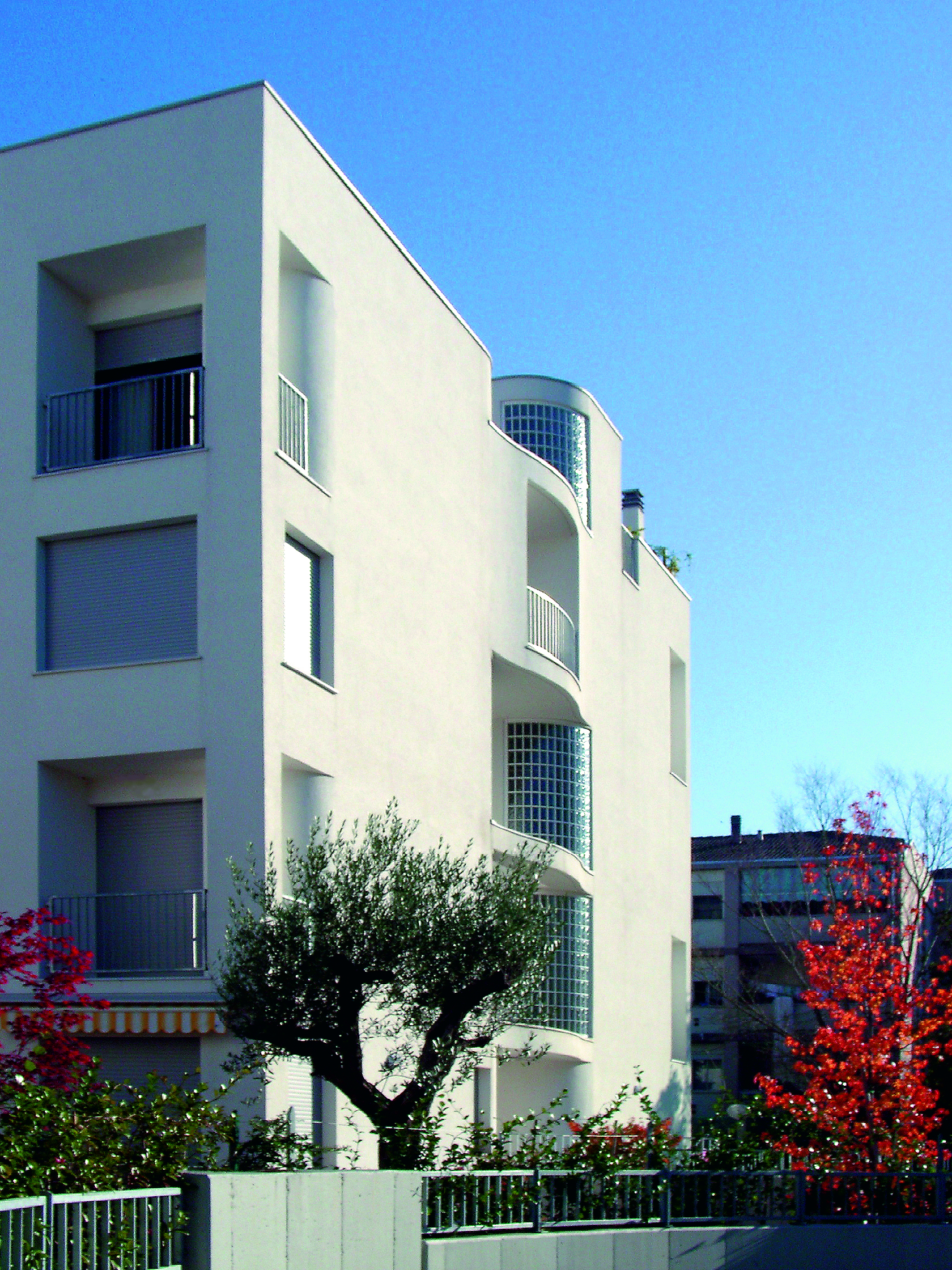
Social Housing Europan 1, Favaro Veneto (Venice). Latitude 45°30'25.85"; longitude 12°17'18.01"

Ruggero Lenci (born 7 January 1955) is an Italian architect and Professor of Architectural Design at the Faculty of Civil and Industrial Engineering of the Sapienza University of Rome.

Born in Rome to architect Sergio Lenci, he has a brother, Roberto, who is also an architect.

Being the author and director of the editorial series Sustainable Architecture, Gangemi has collaborated in the writing of entries for the Italian Enciclopedia Treccani: John M. Johansen, I.M. Pei, Paolo Soleri, Bruno Zevi. His theoretical contribution on "Evolution and architecture between science and design" makes a parallel of scientific disciplines and design ones, from which is derived the following: "The morphogenesis of the project summarizes the history of architecture." Among his major contributions: the design of an experimental housing unit built in Favaro Veneto (Venice) following the award at the "Europan 1" competition (1989); four researches on the "Roman Architectural School" that have produced as many monographs on "Studio Passarelli" (2006), "Pietro Barucci" (2009), the "Casa del Girasole" by Luigi Moretti (2012 ), the Torre Eurosky by Franco Purini and Laura Thermes (2014); designs on the “housing unit” that produced projects (developed in 1989) in Rome, Bergamo, Bologna, Venice, Florence, Bo island - Sweden; the school projects collected in the books "Didactic and Architecture - Theses in Architectural Design" (2007), "Mutations Laurentino 38 - ontogeny and phylogeny of a Roman neighborhood" (2011), "Sustainable Housing, genetic mutations in Tor Bella Monaca" (2019); the essay "The linguistic acquisitions of contemporary architecture between content and expression" (1989).

== Main publications ==
=== Books ===
- Codici linguistici dell'architettura contemporanea, Gangemi, Rome 2025, ISBN 9788849253962
- Franco Purini AI. Traslitterazioni di Ruggero Lenci, Fergen, Rome 2025, ISBN 9788898509676
- Architettura e Filosofia, Autore Bruno Queysanne, (edited by Ruggero Lenci), Gangemi, Rome 2024, ISBN 9788849250725
- Arte e salute (Art & Health), (Foundation Santa Lucia IRCCS Neuroscience-Hospital conference proceedings - October 26,27,28, 2022 - edited by Ruggero Lenci and Amelia Mutti, with texts by Ilaria Capua, Livia Turco, Grazia Labate, Ruggero Lenci, Amelia Mutti, Franco Purini, and others), Fergen Editions, Rome 2023, ISBN 978-88-985-0949-2.
- Archigenesi, Timia Editions, Rome 2022, ISBN 978-88-998-5599-4.
- The Flaminio Project as a research product, (preface Umberto Vattani, introduction Laura Thermes), Editor Gangemi, Rome 2022, ISBN 978-88-492-4512-7.
- Simposio Arte-Architettura su Franco Purini, (edited by Ruggero Lenci, preface by Claudio Strinati), Editor Gangemi, Rome, 2021, ISBN 978-88-492-4135-8.
- Engineers-Architects of the Roman School of Architecture, (preface by Franco Purini, introduction by Alessandra Muntoni), Editor Gangemi, Rome, 2021, ISBN 978-88-492-4057-3.
- The enigma of the housing unit, between theory and design research, (introduction by Franco Purini), Gangemi, Rome 2020, ISBN 978-88-492-3950-8.
- One hundred five questions to Pietro Barucci, (by R. Lenci), CLEAN, Naples 2020, ISBN 978-88-8497-745-8.
- Vultus Urbis, Gangemi, Rome 2020, ISBN 978-88-492-3905-8.
- Sustainable Housing, genetic mutations in Tor Bella Monaca, second edition, Gangemi, Rome 2019. ISBN 978-88-492-3802-0.
- The enigma of the Polygonal work with Concave Blocks and the survey of the Walls of Amelia, (with others), second edition, Gangemi, Rome 2018. ISBN 978-88-492-3718-4.
- Roma, crisi del progetto e della civitas, (with other curators) Ingramspark, 2017. ISBN 979-12-200-2376-4.
- The adventure of a Hermit Crab; fourth edition, 2015. ISBN 978-1-326-41205-0. Narrative for children (languages: Italian, English, French).
- The enigma of Torre Eurosky, Gangemi, Rome 2014. ISBN 978-88-492-2928-8.
- The Europe's Become, Gangemi, Rome 2013. ISBN 978-88-492-2731-4.
- The Roman Summer of Renato Nicolini, Gangemi, Rome 2013. ISBN 978-88-492-2657-7.
- The enigma of the Sunflower, Gangemi, Rome 2012. ISBN 978-88-492-2494-8.
- Mutations Laurentino 38 - Ontogeny and phylogeny of a Roman neighborhood, Prospettive, Rome 2011. ISBN 978-88-89-400-69-2.
- Dynamic Morphemes, Prospettive, Rome 2011. ISBN 978-88-89400-64-7.
- Pietro Barucci Architetto, Electa, Milan 2009. ISBN 978-88-370-6749-6.
- Evolution and Architecture between science and design, Prospettive, Roma 2008. ISBN 978-88-89400-25-8.
- Didactic and Architecture - Theses in Architectural Design, Prospettive, Rome 2007. ISBN 88-89400-18-8.
- Studio Passarelli – one tundre years, one tundre projects, Electa, Milan 2006. ISBN 88-370-4204-3.
- Lenci Valentin – Theorematic architecture, Mancosu, Rome 2005. ISBN 88-87017-43-3.
- I.M. Pei - spatial theoremes, - Testo & Immagine, Turin 2004. ISBN 88-8382-143-2.
- Sergio Lenci - l'Opera Architettonica 1950–2000,(edited by), Diagonale, Rome 2000. ISBN 88-8263-033-1.
- Manzone Architetto, Gangemi, Rome 1997. ISBN 88-7448-759-2.
- Massimiliano Fuksas, Testo & Immagine, Turin 1996. ISBN 88-86498-06-3.

== Critical essays and reviews ==
- Architecture

Mario Antonio Arnaboldi, Pietro Barucci, Massimo Bilò, Tullio Bucciarelli, Cesare Burdese, Enzo Cartapati, Paolo Cavallari, Paolo Colarossi, Claudia Conforti, Roberto De Rubertis, Alessandra Muntoni, Lucio Passarelli, I.M. Pei, Elio Piroddi, Luigi Prestinenza Puglisi, Giuseppe Pullara, Franco Purini, Marcello Rebecchini, Sara Rossi, Adele Naudé Santos, Franco Storelli, Alfonso Testa, Bruno Zevi.

- Art

Nicoletta Agostini, Giovanni Faccenda, Giancarlo Galdi, Guido Moretti, Elisabetta Nardiello, Giorgio Palumbi, I.M. Pei, Maria Claudia Simotti, Franco Purini, Maurizio Vitta, Bruno Zevi.

== Patents ==
Ruggero Lenci appears in the List of Italian inventors to have patented the industrial invention known as the Parking sensors. The application was submitted in Rome, Italy, at the Ministry of Industry on December 13, 1984, by Massimo Ciccarello and Ruggero Lenci, and the patent n. 1196650, was released on November 16, 1988.
