= The Architecture of the City =

1966 book by Aldo Rossi

- Author: Aldo Rossi
- Subject: Architecture
- Publisher: MIT Press
- Publication date: 1966
- ISBN: 978-0262680431

The Architecture of the City (Italian: L'architettura della città) is a seminal book of urban design theory by the Italian architect Aldo Rossi published in Padua in 1966. The book marks the shift from the urban doctrines of modernism to a rediscovery of the traditional European city.

== Background ==
In this book, Rossi criticizes the lack of understanding of the city in current architectural practice. He argues that a city must be studied and valued as something constructed over time; of particular interest are urban artifacts that withstand the passage of time. Rossi held that the city remembers its past (our "collective memory"), and that we use that memory through monuments; that is, monuments give structure to the city. His book has been a major reference for the reconstruction of the city of Berlin after the German reunification in 1990. An English translation was published in 1982.

A major theme of the book is Rossi's critique of the functionalist tradition in modern urbanism, particularly the influence of the Congrès Internationaux d'Architecture Moderne. He argued that cities cannot be understood or designed through purely rational or technical means. Instead, Rossi advocates for the recognition of the “permanence” of certain architectural forms—monuments and typologies that endure and give structure to the city over time. These elements contribute to what he calls the “locus”, a unique sense of place derived from both physical form and cultural significance.
