= Cesare Ligini =

Italian architect (1913–1988)

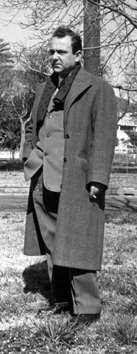
- Born: 23 October 1913; Rome, Kingdom of Italy
- Died: 1988 (aged 74–75); Rome, Italy
- Education: Sapienza University of Rome
- Occupations: Architect, urban planner, set designer

Cesare Ligini (23 October 1913 – 1988) was an Italian architect, urban planner and set designer.

== Life and career ==
After graduating in architecture from the University of Rome in 1939, he began working as a set designer. His early exposure to the arts came through his father Alfredo, who built wooden installations for the Quadriennale exhibitions.

Interrupted by World War II, Ligini resumed his career post-war, participating in national architectural competitions and securing prestigious commissions, such as the Olympic Velodrome in Rome. From the 1950s to the 1970s, he specialized in sports architecture, co-founding the Studio Tecnico Impianti Sportivi with Dagoberto Ortensi and Silvano Ricci, and designing stadiums, gyms, pools, and the Institute of Sports Medicine in Acqua Acetosa, among others.

His contributions to the postwar redevelopment of Rome include the Ministry of Finance buildings (the "Ligini Towers"), Fiumicino Airport's intercontinental terminal, and the National Committee for Nuclear Energy headquarters at Casaccia.

Ligini was prolific in designing churches, schools, hospitals, and residential complexes across Italy, as well as urban plans such as the Orte master plan. He was active in professional institutions, serving on the board of the Rome and Lazio Architects' Association and as secretary of the Lazio section of the National Urban Planning Institute (INU).

In his later years, Ligini returned to his passion for drawing, exhibiting his artworks in Rome in 1982. He died in 1988 from pulmonary complications.

== Sources ==
- Lupo, Valeria (2014). Cesare Ligini architetto. Rome: Prospettive Edizioni.
- Ligini, Cesare (1982). Catalogo della Mostra tenuta a Roma dal 18 novembre al 4 dicembre 1982. Rome: Galleria d'Arte Trifalco.
- Ippolito, Achille Maria; Pagnotta, Mauro (1982). Roma costruita. Le vicende, le problematiche e le realizzazioni dell'architettura a Roma dal 1946 al 1981. Rome: Palombi. pp. 67, 70, 84, 86–87, 99.
- De Guttry, Irene (1989). Guida di Roma moderna dal 1870 ad oggi. Rome: De Luca. pp. 91, 94, 101, 130.
- Sgarbi, Vittorio (1991). Dizionario dei monumenti italiani e dei loro autori. Roma dal Rinascimento ai giorni nostri. Milan: Bompiani. pp. 142–143.
- Rossi, Pietro Ostilio (2000). Roma. Guida all'architettura moderna 1909-2000. Bari: Laterza. p. 123.
