= Carlo Aymonino =

Italian architect and urban planner

Monte Amiata Housing

Carlo Aymonino (18 July 1926 – 3 July 2010) was an Italian architect and urban planner best known for the Monte Amiata housing complex in Milan.

== Early life ==
Born in Rome, he studied at the University of Rome, obtaining his degree in 1950. In the same years, he also got trained by Marcello Piacentini.

== Architectural works ==
The year after his graduation, he opened his architectural practice in Rome. Between 1949 and 1954, with the very famous Mario Ridolfi and Ludovico Quaroni he had his first real professional experience, building the INA-Casa housing complex. This was located in Rome, on Via Tiburtina, and is a remarkable example of Italian neo-realism.

Through this architectural experience, he acquired the practical skills which will be visible in later housing projects. Among the letter, remarkable were the 1955 'Spine Bianche' complex, located in the city of Matera, and the 1957 'Tratturo dei Preti' housing project, in the city of Foggia.

From 1967 to 1970, Aymonino, as part of Studio AYDE, collaborated with Aldo Rossi on the design of the Monte Amiata housing blocks in the Gallaratese district in Milan.

== Writer and editor ==
Starting in 1954, Aymonino also worked as editor of the magazine Il contemporaneo.

Between 1957 and 1965 he also wrote for Casabella, participating to the late 1950s strong, vivid cultural and architectural debates.

In 1973, Aymonino published L'Abitazione Razionale: Atti de Congressi CIAM 1929-30, an analysis of social housing. It catalogued and analyzed apartment plans from modernist developments in European and American cities, as well as older courtyard houses and linear houses. It was one of the early examples of a typological approach to architecture and urbanism, which are central to the neo-Rationalist and New Urbanist movements. The book also included reprints of papers on social housing from the Congrès International d'Architecture Moderne (CIAM) conferences in Frankfurt in 1929 (papers by Sigfried Giedion, Ernst May, Walter Gropius, Le Corbusier, Victor Bourgeois), and in Brussels in 1930 (Giedion, Böhm and Kaufmann, Gropius, Richard Neutra, and Karel Teige).

== Town planner ==
In 1957 Carlo Aymonino became a founder as well as a member of the Società di Architettura e Urbanistica - S.A.U. (Town Planning & Architecture Society).

Concerning the town planning activity, Aymonino developed the idea of the Directional Centre as a tool capable of linking a city to its surroundings. This appeared applicable in particular to recognizable urban typologies.

Aymonino put into practice such concepts and theories in the 1962 competition proposals for the city centres of Turin and Bologna.

== Studio AYDE ==
In 1960 he founded Studio AYDE with Maurizio Aymonino, his brother, and with Baldo and Alessandro De Rossi.
