= Gianfranco Caniggia =

Italian architect

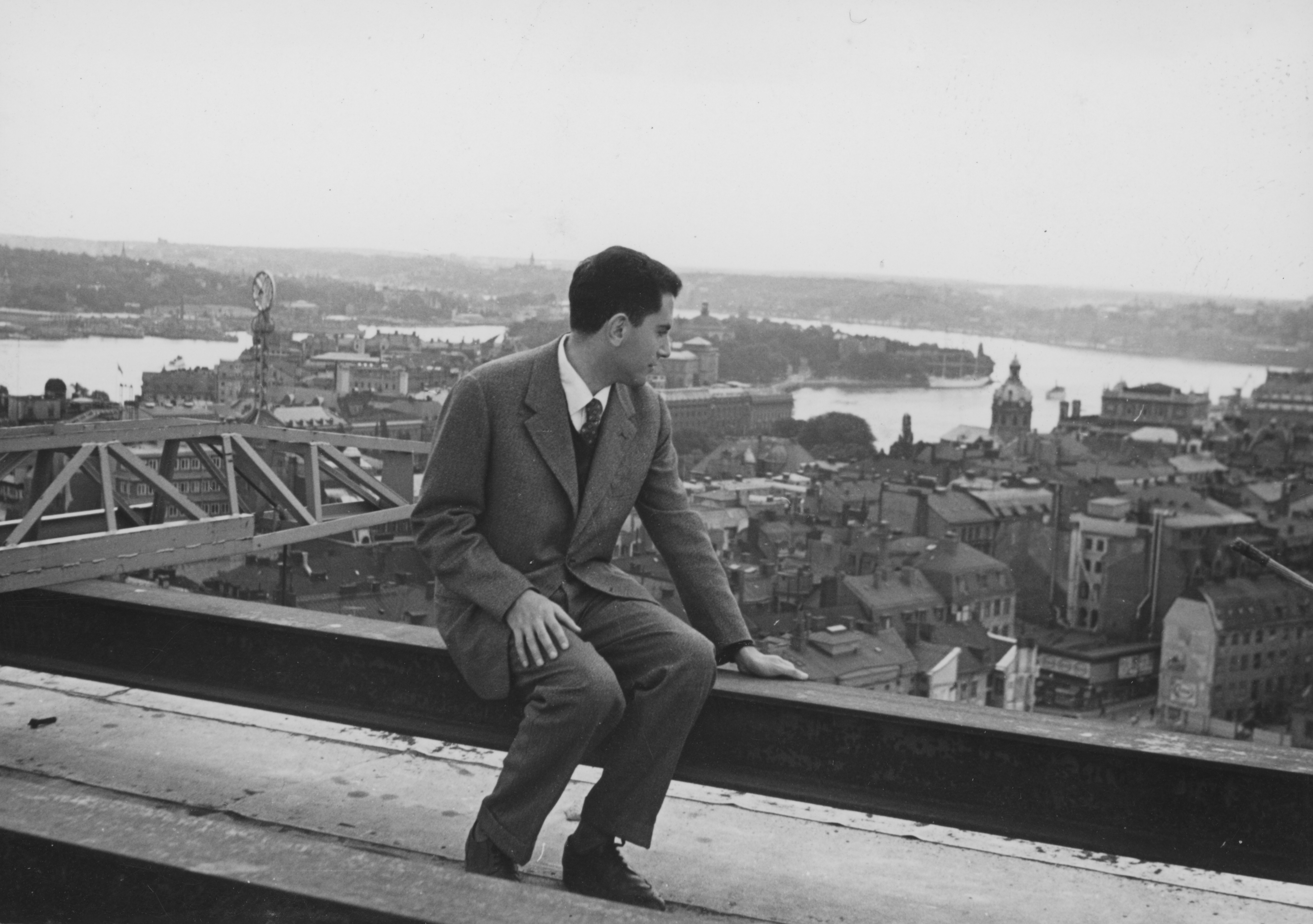
- Caniggia in 1959
- Born: 7 May 1933; Rome, Kingdom of Italy
- Died: 10 November 1987 (aged 54); Rome, Lazio, Italy
- Education: Sapienza University of Rome
- Occupations: Architect, urban planner

Gianfranco Caniggia (7 May 1933 – 10 November 1987) was an Italian architect and urban planner.

== Life and career ==
Caniggia was a student of Saverio Muratori at the University of Rome and distinguished himself through his restoration work in the historic centers of Como, Isernia, Florence, Naples, and Benevento.

His notable projects include residential buildings on Via Trinità dei Pellegrini in Rome, created in collaboration with his father, Emanuele (1957); the civil hospital of Isola del Liri (1960–1963); offices for the municipal and judicial authorities in Sora (1962); the Lecce Courthouse (1961–1969); the Teramo Courthouse (1968–1981); and various restoration projects in Como, including Palazzo Volpi (1970), Borgo Sant'Agostino (1971), Palazzo Giovio and Palazzo Olginati (1972).

In the 1980s, Caniggia designed the Colle degli Ometti housing in Quinto al Mare, Genoa.

Since 1971, he has held teaching positions at various universities, including those in Reggio Calabria, Florence, Genoa, and Rome. He also served as a commissioner at the Venice Biennale of Architecture.

== Sources ==
- Adelaide Regazzoni Caniggia (1987). Gianfranco Caniggia, 1933-1987. Venice.
- Matteo Ieva (2020). Morfologia urbana e linguaggio nell'opera di Gianfranco Caniggia. Milan: FrancoAngeli.
- Sergio Polano (1991). Guida all'architettura italiana del Novecento. Milan. p. 575.
- Piero Ostilio Rossi (1984). Roma. Guida all'architettura moderna (1909-1984). Bari: Laterza. p. 167.
- Gianfranco Spagnesi (1991). "CANIGGIA, Gianfranco". Enciclopedia Italiana: V Appendice. Istituto dell'Enciclopedia Italiana.
- Manfredo Tafuri (1986). Storia dell'architettura italiana. Bari: Laterza.
