= Aldo Rossi =

Italian architect (1931–1997)

- Rossi in 1986/87
- Born: 3 May 1931; Milan, Italy
- Died: 4 September 1997 (aged 66); Milan, Italy
- Education: Polytechnic University of Milan
- Occupation: Architect
- Awards: Pritzker Prize (1990)
- Buildings: Monte Amiata complex, Teatro Carlo Felice, Teatro La Fenice, Bonnefanten Museum

Aldo Rossi (3 May 1931 – 4 September 1997) was an Italian architect and designer who was recognised internationally for his contributions to architecture, academia, architectural theory, as well as furniture and product design. Rossi was one of the leading proponents of the postmodern movement. He was the first Italian recipient of the Pritzker Prize for architecture.

== Early life ==
He was born in Milan, Italy. After early education by the Somascan Religious Order and then at Alessandro Volta College in Lecco in 1949, he went to the school of architecture at the Polytechnic University of Milan. His thesis advisor was Piero Portaluppi, and he graduated in 1958.

In 1955, he started writing for, and from 1959 was one of the editors of, the architectural magazine Casabella-Continuità, with the editor-in-chief Ernesto Nathan Rogers. Rossi left in 1964 when the chief editorship went to Gian Antonio Bernasconi. Rossi went on to work for Società magazine and Il_contemporaneo, making him one of the most active participants in the fervent cultural debate of the time.

His early articles cover architects such as Alessandro Antonelli, Mario Ridolfi, Auguste Perret and Emil Kaufmann, and much of this material became part of his second book, Scritti scelti sull'architettura e la città 1956–1972 (Selected writings on architecture and the city from 1956 to 1972). He married the Swiss actress Sonia Gessner, who introduced him to the world of film and theatre. Culture and his family became central to his life. His son Fausto was active in filmmaking both in front of and behind the camera. His daughter Vera was involved with theatre.

== Career ==
He began his professional career at the studio of Ignazio Gardella in 1956, moving on to the studio of Marco Zanuso. In 1963, he also began teaching, firstly as an assistant to Ludovico Quaroni (1963) at the school of urban planning in Arezzo, then to Carlo Aymonino at the Institute of Architecture in Venice. In 1965, he was appointed lecturer at the Polytechnic University of Milan, and the following year he published The Architecture of the City, which soon became a classic of architectural literature.

His professional career, initially dedicated to architectural theory and small building work, took a huge leap forward when Aymonino allowed Rossi to design part of the Monte Amiata complex in the Gallaratese quarter of Milan. In 1971, he won the design competition for the extension of the San Cataldo Cemetery in Modena, which made him internationally famous. The work was representative of Rossi's repetitive postmodernist design, but was also representative of a common objection to Rossi's work: that it focused too much on "monumental collectivity" over individualism.

After suspension from teaching in Italy in those politically troubled times, he moved to ETH Zurich, occupying the chair in architectural design from 1971 to 1975.

In 1973, he was director of the International Architecture Section at the XV Milan Triennial Exhibition of Decorative Arts and Modern Architecture, where he presented, among others, his student Arduino Cantafora. Rossi's design ideas for the exhibition are explained in the International Architecture Catalogue and in a 16mm documentary Ornament and crime directed by Luigi Durissi and produced along with Gianni Braghieri and Franco Raggi. In 1975, Rossi returned to the teaching profession in Italy, teaching architectural composition in Venice.

In 1979, he was made a member of the prestigious Academy of Saint Luke. Meanwhile, there was international interest in his skills. He taught at several universities in the United States, including Cooper Union in New York City and Cornell University in Ithaca (New York State). At Cornell, he participated in the Institute for Architecture and Urban Studies joint venture with New York's Museum of Modern Art, travelling to China and Hong Kong and attending conferences in South America.

In 1981, he published his autobiography, A scientific autobiography. In this work, the author, "in discrete disorder", brings back memories, objects, places, forms, literary notes, quotes, and insights and tries to "... go over things or impressions, describe, or look for ways to describe." In the same year, he won first prize at the international competition for the design of an apartment block on the corner of Kochstraße and Wilhelmstraße in central Berlin.

In 1984, together with Ignazio Gardella and Fabio Reinhart, he won the competition for the renovation of the Teatro Carlo Felice in Genoa, which was not fully completed until 1991. In 1985 and 1986, Rossi was director of the 3rd (respectively 4th) International Architecture Exhibition at the Venice Biennale, including further away display spaces such as Villa Farsetti in Santa Maria di Sala.

In 1987, he won two international competitions: one for a site at the Parc de la Villette in Paris, the other for the Deutsches Historisches Museum in Berlin, which was never brought to fruition. In 1989, he continued product design work for Unifor (now part of Molteni Furniture) and Alessi. His espresso maker La Cupola, designed for Alessi, came out in 1988.

In 1990, he was awarded the Pritzker Prize. The city of Fukuoka in Japan honoured him for his work on the hotel complex The Palace and he won the 1991 Thomas Jefferson Medal in Public Architecture from the American Institute of Architects. These prestigious awards were followed by exhibitions at the Centre Georges Pompidou in Paris, the Beurs van Berlage in Amsterdam, the Berlinische Galerie in Berlin and the Museum of Contemporary Art in Ghent, Belgium.

In 1996, he became an honorary member of the American Academy of Arts and Letters and the following year he received their special cultural award in architecture and design. He died in Milan on 4 September 1997, following a car accident. Posthumously, he received the Torre Guinigi prize for his contribution to urban studies and the Seaside Prize of the Seaside Institute, Florida, where he had built a detached family home in 1995.

On appeal, his proposals won the 1999 competition for the restoration of the Teatro La Fenice, Venice, and it reopened in 2004. In 1999, the Faculty of Architecture of the University of Bologna, based in Cesena, was named after him.

== Work ==
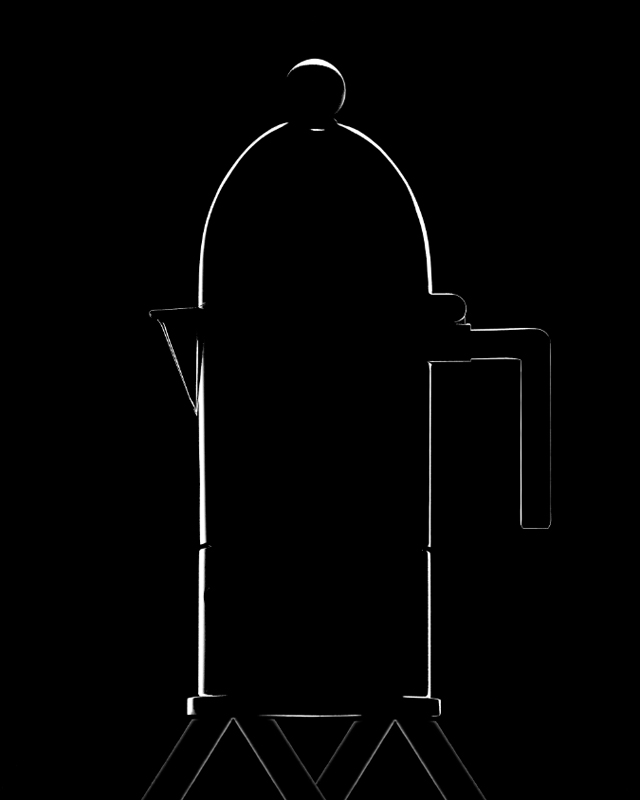
Aldo Rossi La Cupola Espresso Maker 1988, produced by Alessi

His earliest works of the 1960s were mostly theoretical and displayed a simultaneous influence of 1920s Italian modernism (see Giuseppe Terragni), classicist influences of Viennese architect Adolf Loos, and the reflections of the painter Giorgio de Chirico. A trip to the Soviet Union to study Stalinist architecture also left a marked impression.

In his writings, Rossi criticized the lack of understanding of the city in current architectural practice. He argued that a city must be studied and valued as something constructed over time; of particular interest are urban artefacts that withstand the passage of time. Rossi held that the city remembers its past (our "collective memory"), and that we use that memory through monuments; that is, monuments give structure to the city. Inspired by the persistence of Europe's ancient cities, Rossi strove to create similar structures immune to obsolescence.

He became extremely influential in the late 1970s and 1980s, as his body of built work expanded and his theories were promoted in his books The Architecture of the City (L'architettura della città, 1966) and A Scientific Autobiography (Autobiografia scientifica, 1981). The largest of Rossi's projects in terms of scale was the San Cataldo Cemetery, in Modena, Italy, which began in 1971, but is yet to be completed. Rossi referred to it as a "city of the dead".

The distinctive independence of his buildings is reflected in the micro-architectures of the products designed by Rossi. In the 1980s, Rossi designed stainless steel cafetières and other products for Alessi, Pirelli, and others.

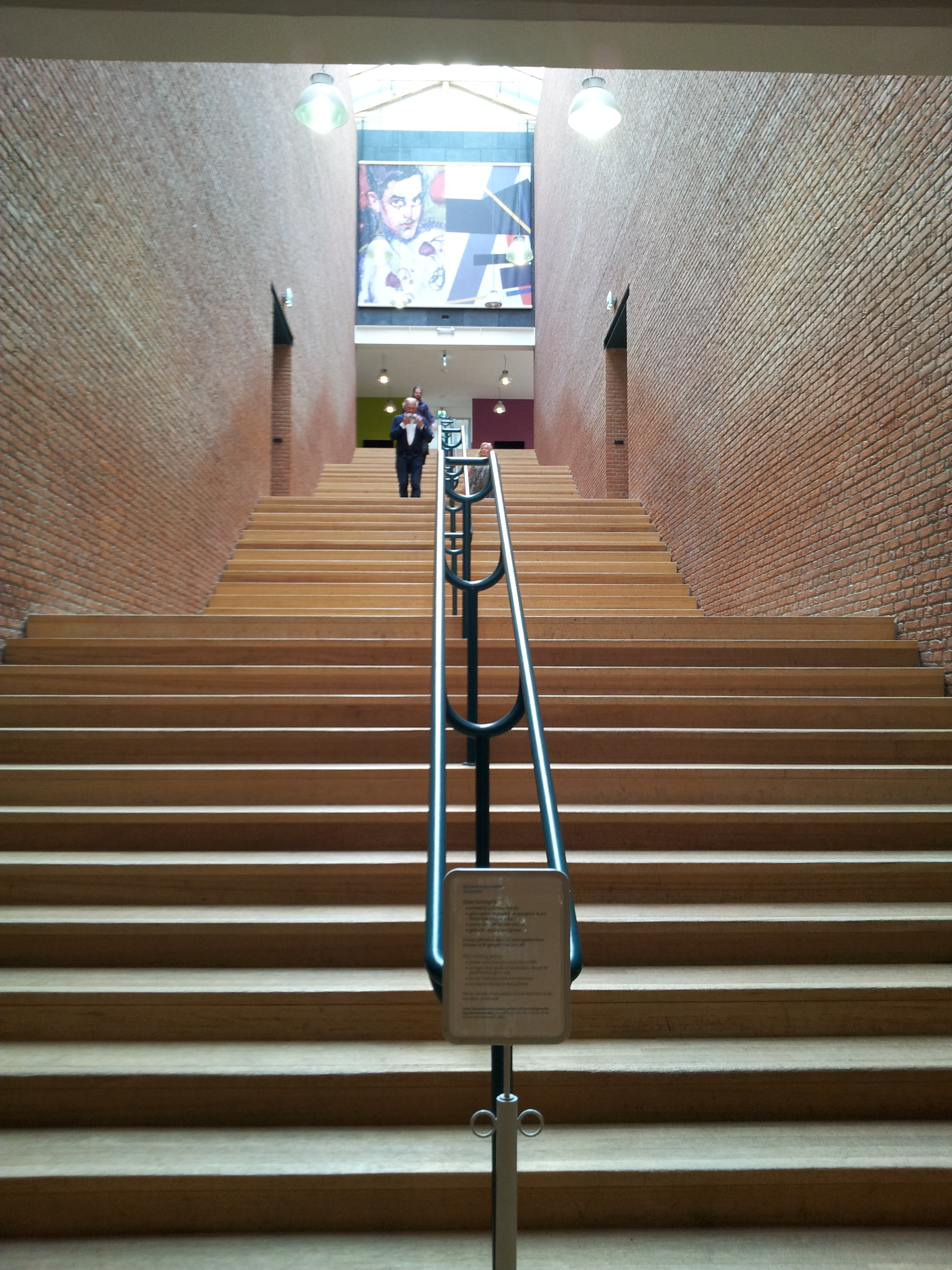
Central staircase Bonnefanten Museum, Maastricht

== Exhibits ==
For the Venice Biennale in 1980, Rossi designed a floating Teatro del Mondo that seated 250 people. For the Venice Biennale in 1984, he designed a triumphal arch at the entrance to the exhibition site. In 2006, two pylons based on an original 1989 design by Aldo Rossi were erected in front of the Bonnefanten Museum in Maastricht by the Delft architectural firm Ufo Architecten. The MAXXI museum in Rome staged a retrospective titled Aldo Rossi, The Architect and the Cities in 2021.

== Awards ==
Aldo Rossi won the prestigious Pritzker Prize for architecture in 1990. Ada Louise Huxtable, an architectural critic and Pritzker juror, has described Rossi as "a poet who happens to be an architect."

== Architecture ==
- 1960 Villa ai Ronchi in Versilia
- 1962 Competition for the Monument to the Resistance in Cuneo
- 1964 Competition for the new Paganini theatre and Piazza della Pilotta in Parma
- 1964 Bridge for the Triennale in Milan
- 1965 Monumental fountain at Segrate
- 1966 Competition for the district of San Rocco in Monza
- 1967–1974 Monte Amiata complex, Gallaratese Quarter, Milan, with Carlo Aymonino
- 1968 Design for the town hall in Scandicci
- 1971–1984 Ossuary and the Cemetery of San Cataldo in Modena
- 1972 Design for City Hall Muggiò
- 1972 Primary school in Fagnano Olona
- 1973 Documentary movie "Ornament and crime" for the Triennale in Milan
- 1974 Design for the regional council headquarters and for a student residence in Trieste
- 1976 Design for a student residence in Chieti
- 1977 Design for a business centre in Florence
- 1977 Single-family homes in Mozzo
- 1978 Teatrino scientifico
- 1979 Apartments in Südliche Friedrichstadt for the exhibition IBA 84 in West Berlin, Germany
- 1979 Torri shopping centre in Parma
- 1979 Middle school in Broni, with Arduino Cantafora
- 1979 Monumental tower, Melbourne, Australia
- 1980 The floating 250-seat Teatro del Mondo and triumphal arch, both built for the Venice Biennale
- 1981–1988 Berlin Block on Kochstraße at its junction with Wilhelmstraße in Berlin, Germany
- 1982 Head Office of Fontivegge in Perugia
- 1982 House Pocono Pines, Mount Pocono in Pennsylvania, USA
- 1982 Isle of Elba cabins for Bruno Longoni
- 1983 Design for the town hall of Borgoricco
- 1984–1987 Casa Aurora, home of GFT Financial Textile Group, Turin
- 1984 Preparation for the Pitti-Uomo men's fashion event in Florence
- 1984–1991 Renovation of Teatro Carlo Felice, Genoa
- 1985 Preparation of a trade exhibition stand for GFT Financial Textile Group, Turin
- 1985 Residential building in the Vialba quarter of Milan
- 1986 South Villette in Paris, France
- 1987 Palace Hotel (Hotel il Palazzo) in Fukuoka, Japan
- 1987 Lighthouse Theatre, Toronto
- 1988–1991 Hotel Duca di Milano, Milan
- 1988–1990 Monument to Sandro Pertini, Milan
- 1989 de Lamel appartements, The Hague, Netherlands
- 1989 Urban plan for the greater urban area Pisorno, Tirrenia (Pisa)
- 1990–1992 Residential building and former industrial area, Città di Castello
- 1990–1993 Club House of the Cosmopolitan Golf Club in Tirrenia (Pisa)
- 1990 Social health complex in via Canova in Florence
- 1991 Administrative building for The Walt Disney Company in Orlando, Florida
- 1991 Contemporary arts centre on the island of Vassivière in Beaumont-du-Lac, France
- 1991 Redevelopment of former industrial cotton mill Cantoni in Castellanza as the main campus of the University Carlo Cattaneo
- 1991 Post office and apartments near the City of Music in Paris (19th arrondissement), France
- 1992 Reconstruction of the Teatro Carlo Felice in Genoa with Ignazio Gardella
- 1993 Personal Florentine wardrobe for Bruno Longoni
- 1994–1998 Schützenstraße quarter, Berlin (photographs)
- 1995 Bonnefantenmuseum in Maastricht, Netherlands
- 1995 Regeneration of the former Kursaal area in Montecatini
- 1996 Complex for a magazine in Berlin, Germany
- 1996 Ca' di Cozzi central district in Verona
- 1996–1998 Mojiko Hotel, Kitakyushu, Japan
- 1997 Design for the Arts Factory district in Bologna
- 1997 Terranova shopping centre, Olbia, Sardinia
- 1999–2004 Refurbishment of Teatro La Fenice, Venice
- 2000 Riverside Building at the Walt Disney Studios, Burbank, California
- 2001 Scholastic Corporation Headquarters, New York City, USA

== Product design ==
In addition to architecture, Rossi created product designs, including:

- 1982 The Conical coffee maker and kettle for Alessi
- 1983 Teatro chair for Molteni Group with the collaboration of Luca Meda;
- 1987 Milan chair for Molteni Group;
- 1988 La Cupola coffee maker for Alessi;
- 1988 Il Conico tea kettle for Alessi;
- 1989 Paris chair for Unifor, now part of Molteni Group;
- 1989 Decartes bookshelf for Unifor, now part of Molteni Group;
- 1989 Consiglio table for Unifor, now part of Molteni Group;
- 1989 Moment clock for Alessi.

== Publications ==
- L'architettura della città (The Architecture of the City), Padua: Marsilio 1966.
- Scritti scelti sull'architettura e la città: 1956–1972 (Selected Writings on architecture and the city: 1956–1972), edited by R. Bonicalzi, Milan: ULC, 1975.
- Autobiografia scientifica (A scientific autobiography), Parma: Practices, 1990.

== Gallery ==
Quartiere Gallaratese/Monte Amita Housing, Milano (1968-1973)

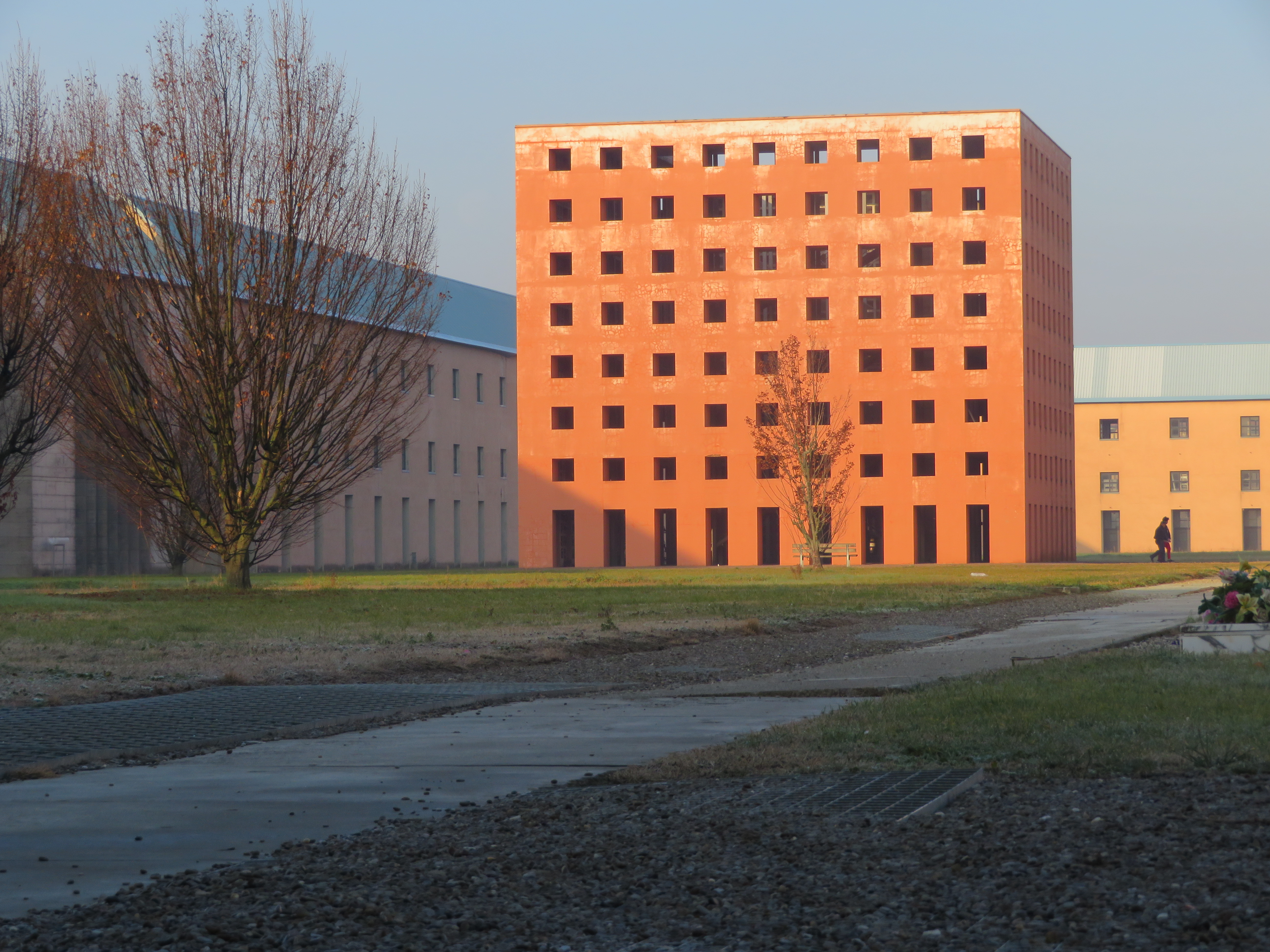
San Cataldo Cemetery, Modena (1971-84)

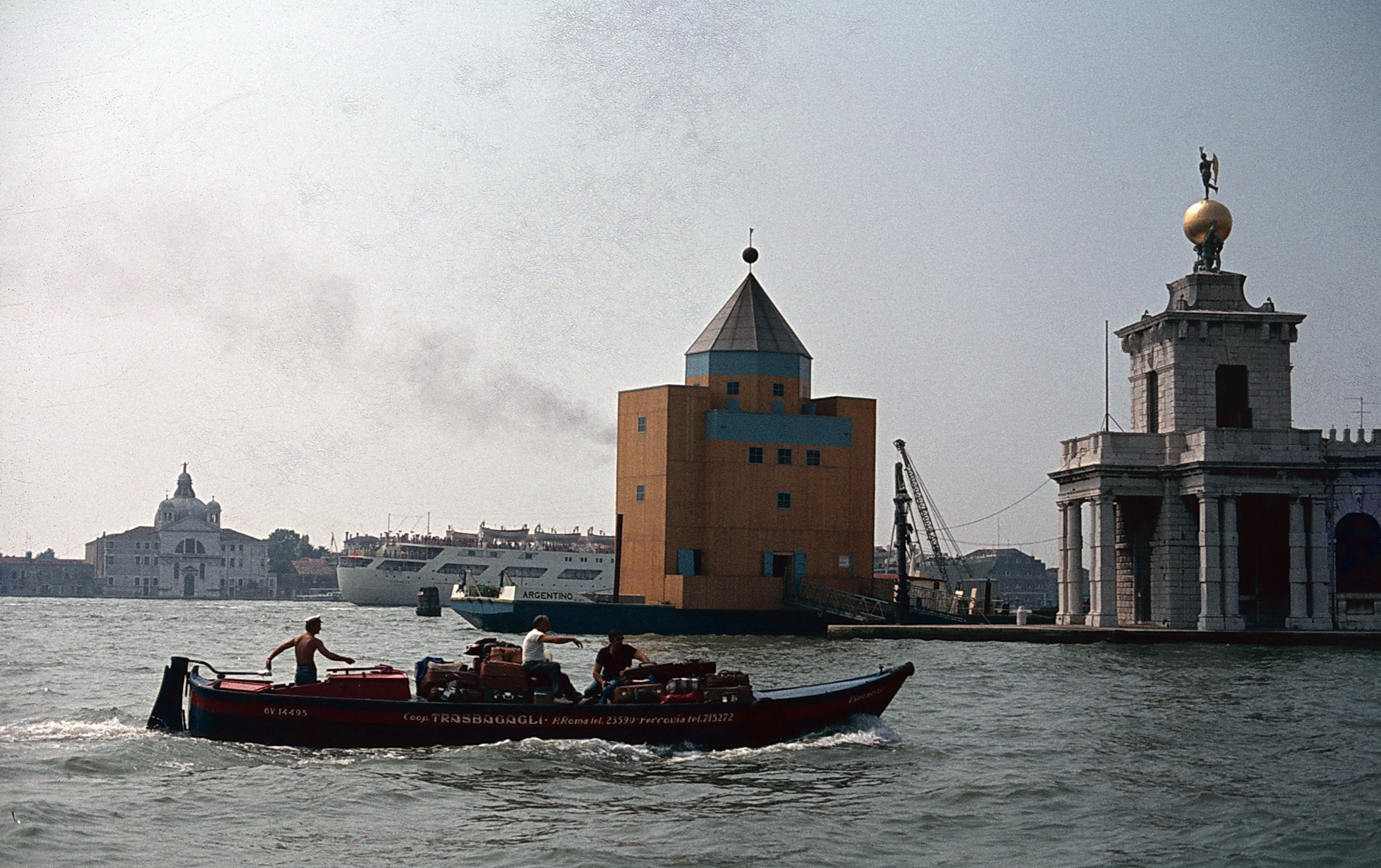
Teatro del Mondo, Venice Biennale (1980)

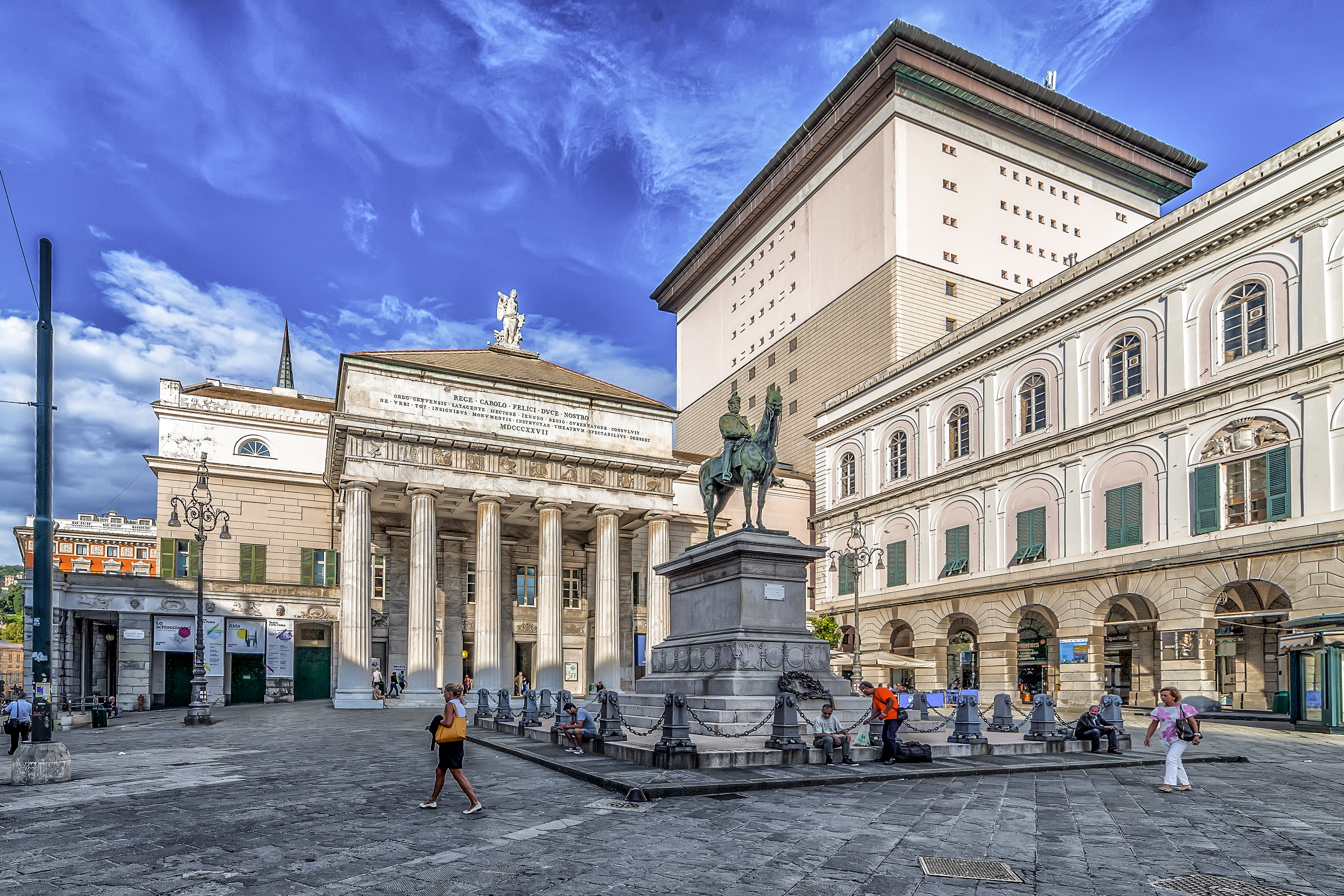
Teatro Carlo Felice, Genoa (1981)

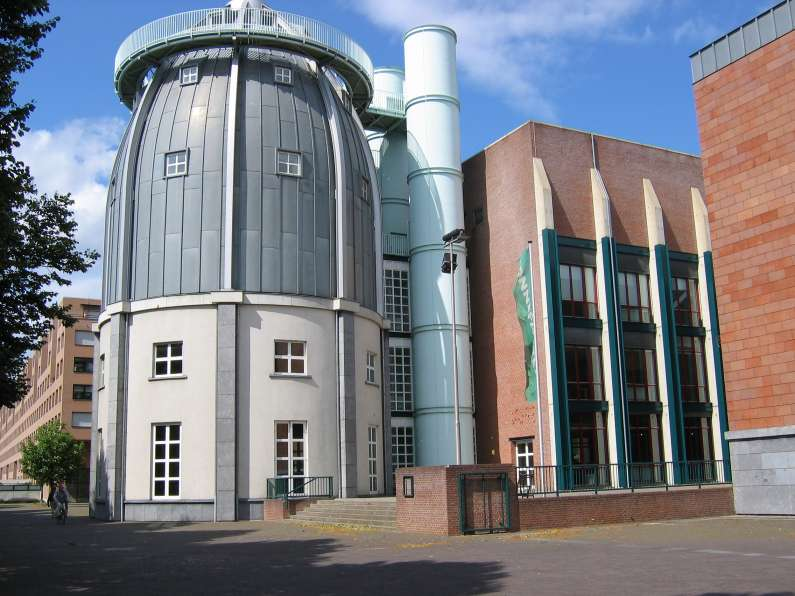
Bonnefanten Museum, Maastricht (1990–94)

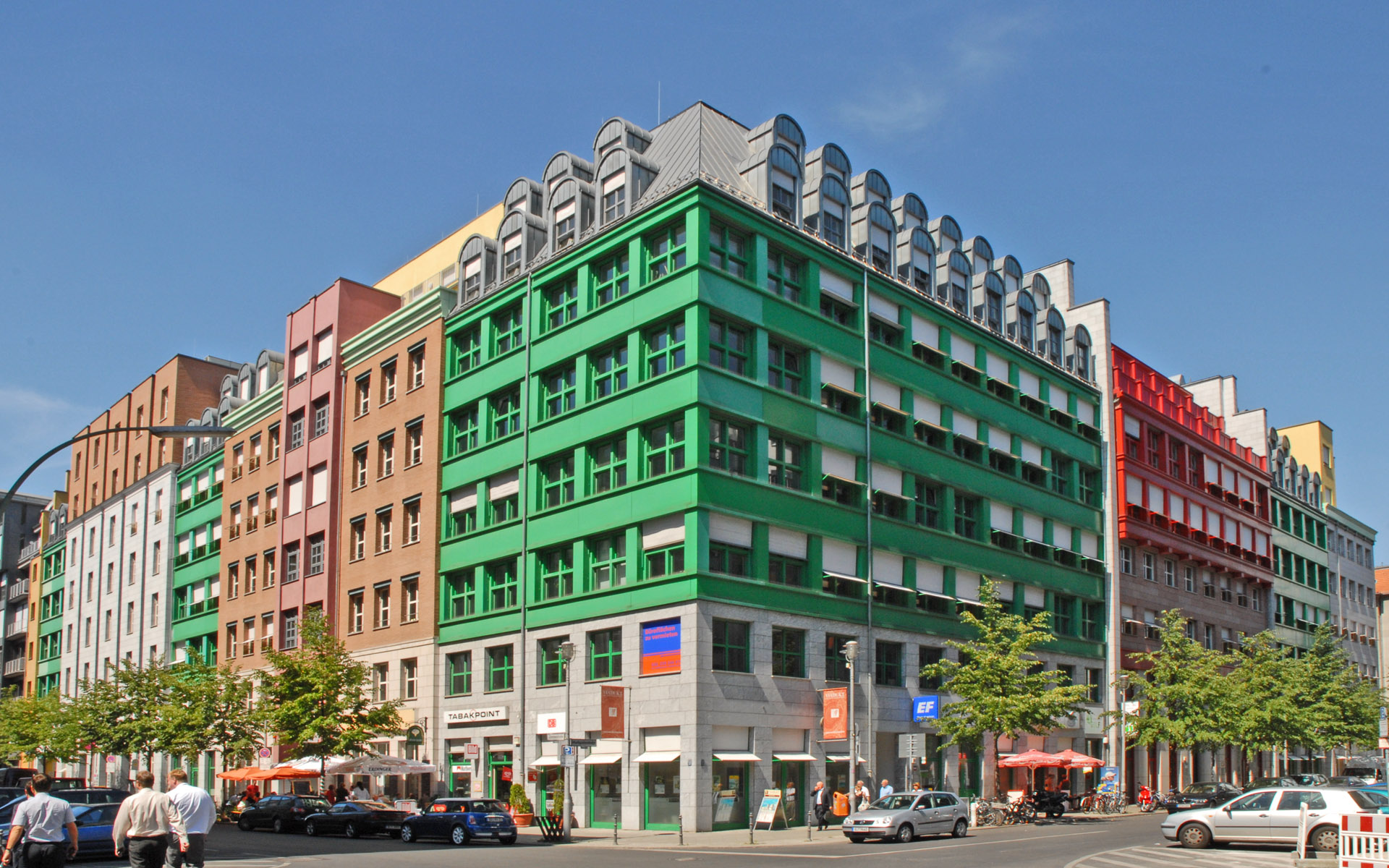
Quartier Schützenstrasse, Berlin (1994–98)

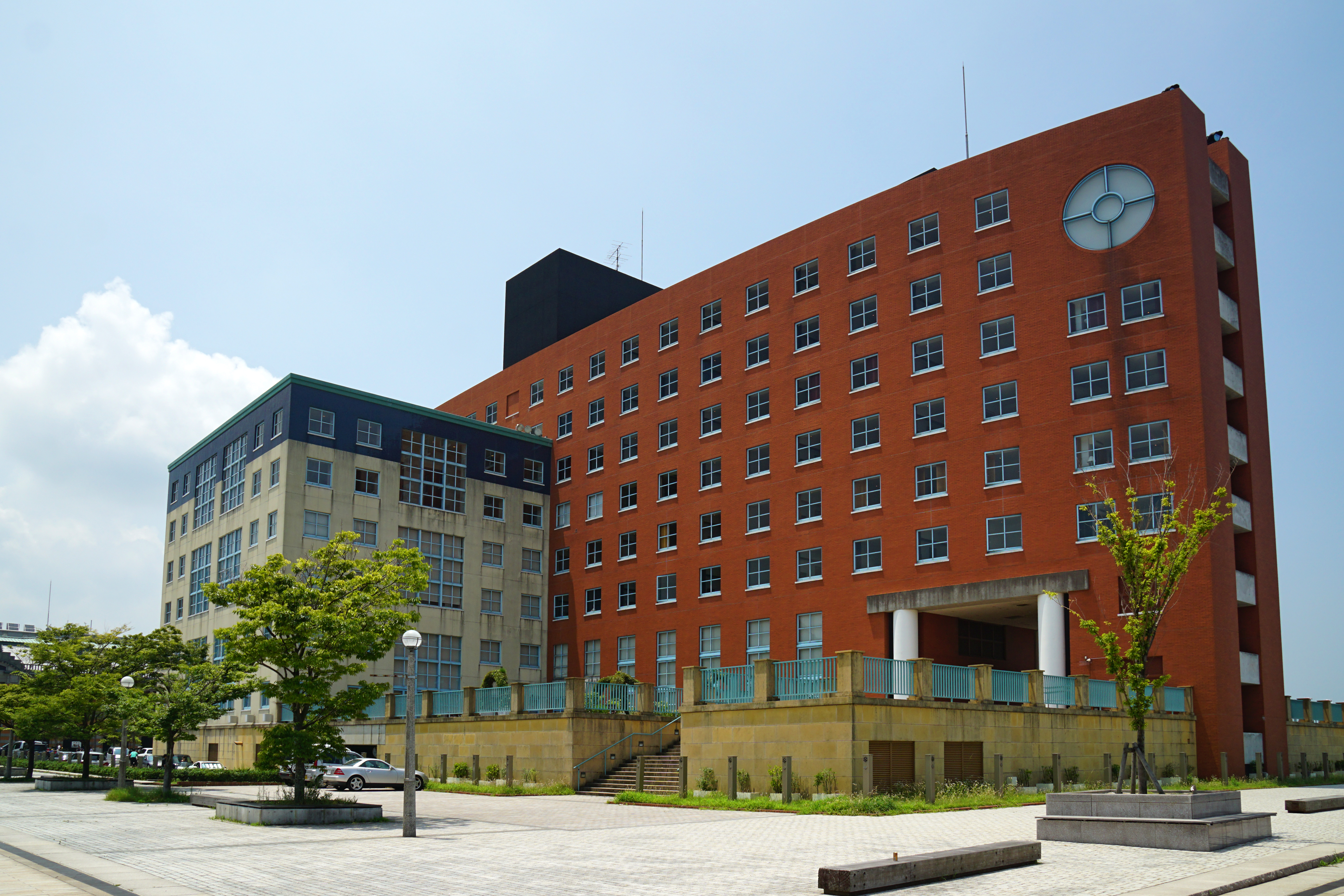
Mojiko Hotel, Kitakyushu (1996–98)

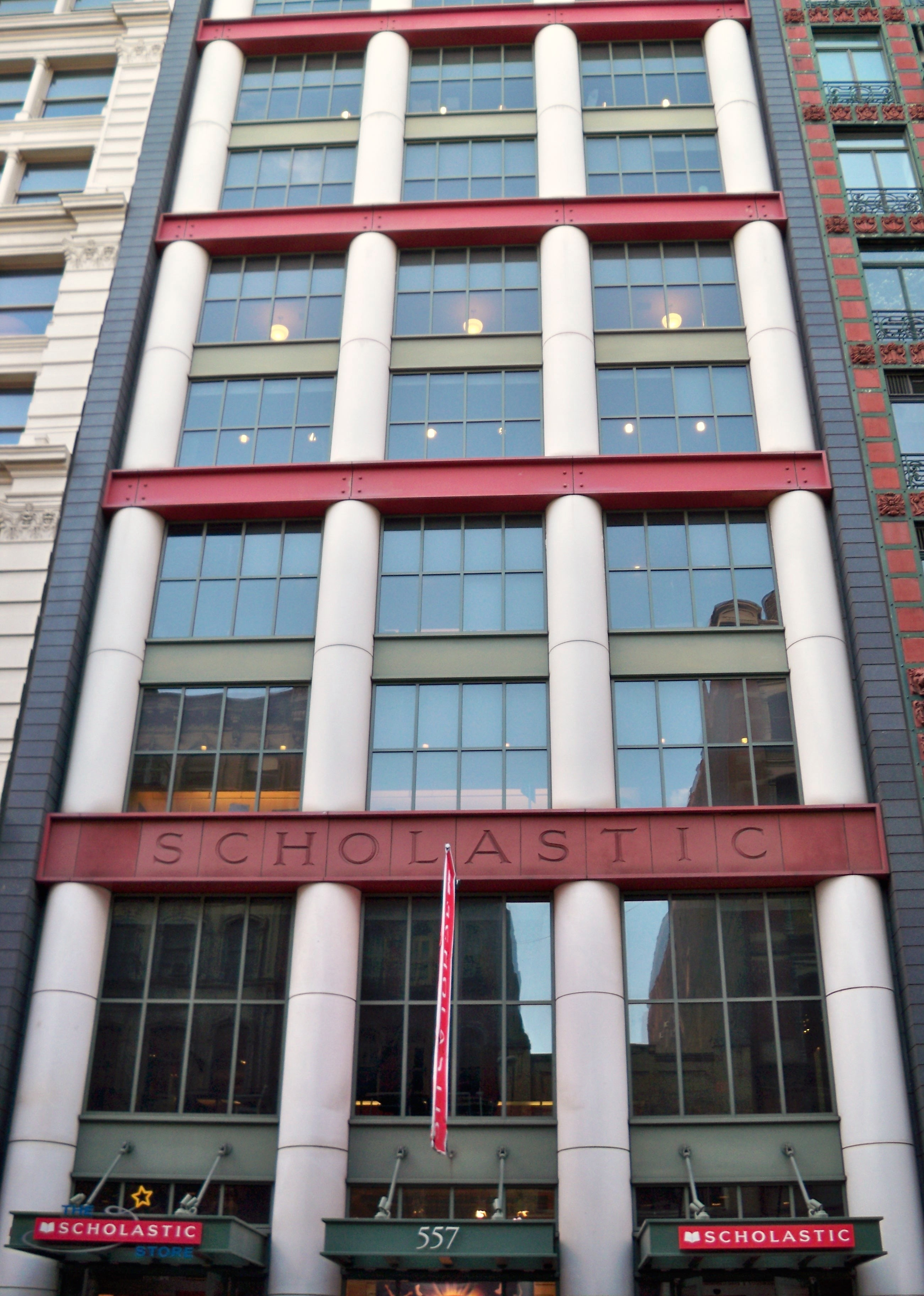
Scholastic Building, New York City (2001)
