= Palazzo Eni =

Building in Rome, Italy

Coordinates: 41°49′38″N 12°28′18″E

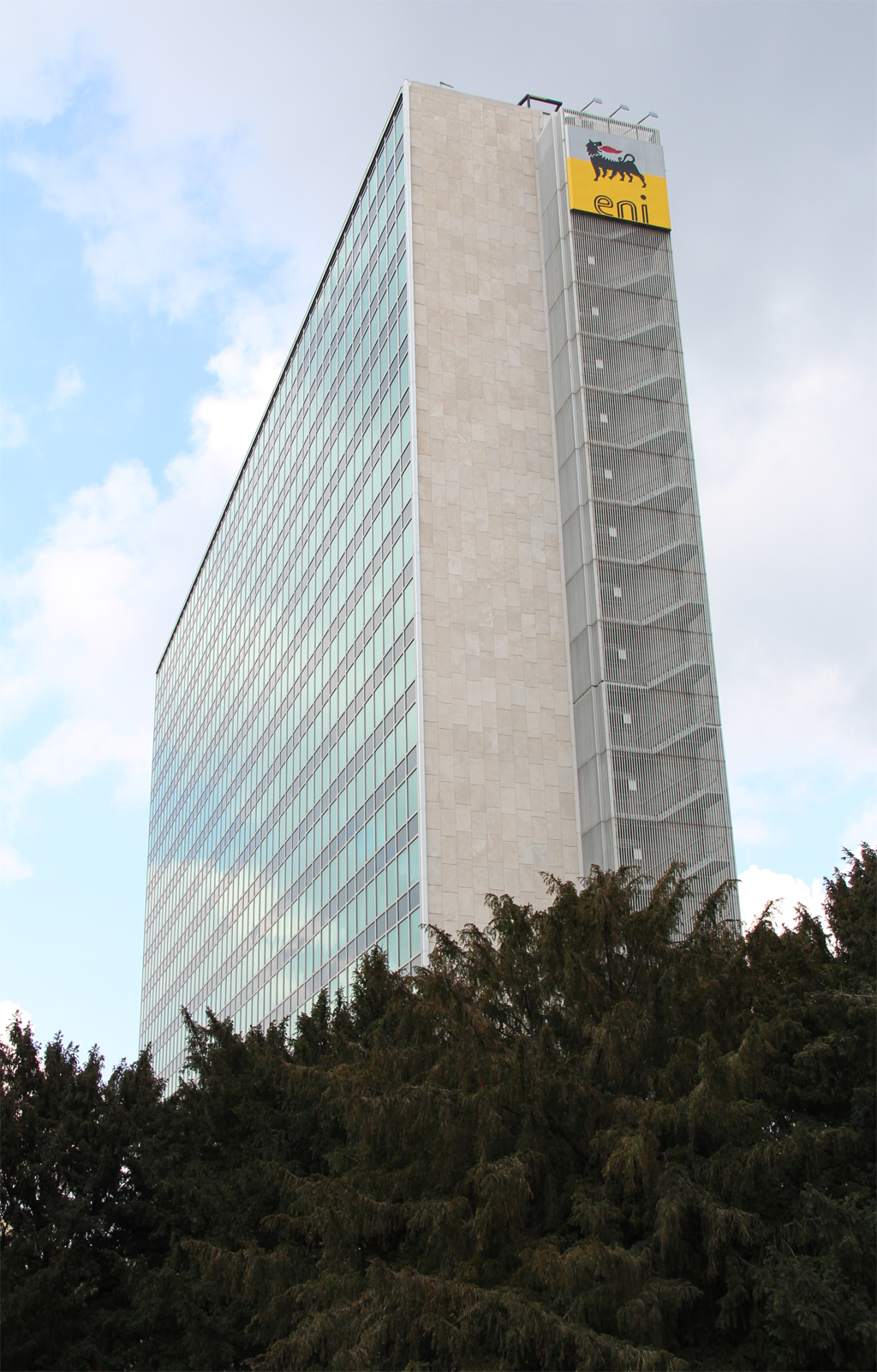

General information
- Status: Completed
- Type: Office
- Location: Piazzale Enrico Mattei, 1 00144 EUR, Rome; Italy
- Completed: 1962

Height
- Height: 80 m (262 ft)

Technical details
- Floor count: 22

Palazzo Eni (also Palazzo ENI) is an office skyscraper in Rome, Italy. It is 80 meters tall and has 22 floors. At the time of its completion in 1962, it was the tallest building in Rome. As of 2015, it is the third tallest building in the city, after Torre Eurosky and Torre Europarco. It lies within the EUR district of Rome and hosts the headquarters of Eni, an Italian multinational oil and gas company.

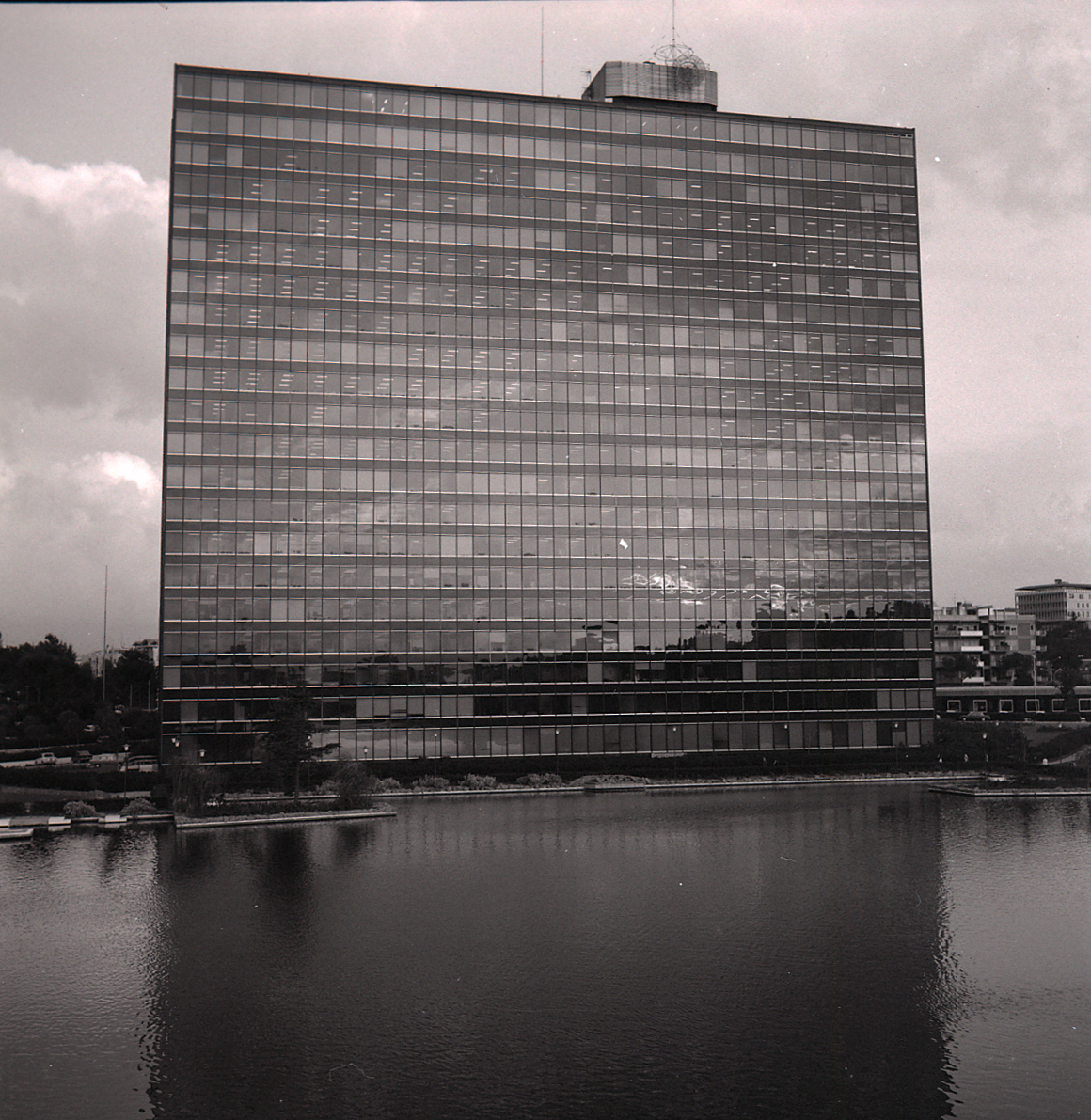
Photo by Paolo Monti, 1967.

== See also ==
- List of tallest buildings in Rome
