= List of tallest buildings and structures in Rome =

Skyline of Rome
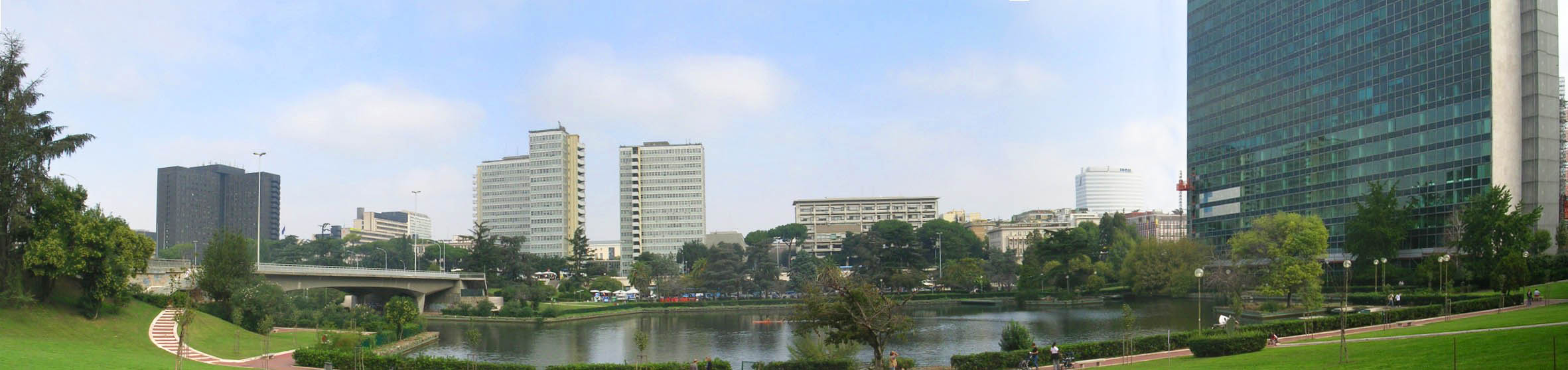
- EUR, the central business district of Rome
- Tallest building: Torre Eurosky (2012)
- Tallest building height: 155 m (509 ft)
- Major clusters: EUR
- First 150 m+ building: Torre Eurosky (2012)

Number of tall buildings
- Taller than 50 m (164 ft): 20
- Taller than 100 m (328 ft): 6
- Taller than 150 m (492 ft): 2

Rome is the third-largest city in the European Union by population within city limits. The city has two skyscrapers above 100 m (330 ft) and several over 50 m (160 ft), most of which lie in EUR, which is located south of the historic centre of Rome. No building of the historic centre of Rome is taller than St. Peter's Basilica at 136.6 m (448 ft), which dominates the skyline of the city.

== Tallest structures ==
The list includes structures above 50 m (160 ft) in the city of Rome and its metropolitan area.

Rank	Name	Image	Height m (ft)	Floors	Year	Use	Notes
1	Torre Telecom Italia		178 m (584 ft)	N/A	1983	Communication	
2	Torre Eurosky		155 m (509 ft)	30	2012	Residential, office	
3	Monte Mario transmitting center		146 m (479 ft)	N/A	1937	Communication	
4	St. Peter's Basilica		137 m (449 ft)	N/A	1626	Religion	
=5	Torre Europarco		120 m (390 ft)	30	2012	Residential	
=5	Eur Water Center		120 m (390 ft)	N/A	1989	Water tower	
7	Gazometro di Roma		89 m (292 ft)	N/A	1937	Industrial	
8	Victor Emmanuel II Monument		81 m (266 ft)	N/A	1935	Monument	
9	Palazzo ENI		80 m (260 ft)	22	1962	Office	
10	Santa Maria Maggiore		75 m (246 ft)	N/A	1743	Religion	
11	Grattacielo delle Poste		73 m (240 ft)	20	1965	Office	
12	INAIL Tower		72 m (236 ft)	21	1965	Office	
13	Grattacielo Italia		71 m (233 ft)	20	1960	Office	
14	Hotel Scacciapensieri		70 m (230 ft)	20	1974	Hotel	
15	Palazzo della Civiltà Italiana		68 m (223 ft)	12	1940	Office	
16=	Torri Ligini A		67 m (220 ft)	17	1961	Office	
16=	Torri Ligini B		67 m (220 ft)	17	1961	Office	
16=	Torri Ligini C		67 m (220 ft)	17	1961	Office	
19	BNL BNP Paribas headquarters		52 m (171 ft)	12	2016	Office	
20	Torre delle Milizie		50 m (160 ft)	N/A	c. 1200	Watchtower	

== See also ==
- List of tallest buildings in Italy
