= INAIL Tower =

Coordinates: 41°49′50″N 12°28′30″E

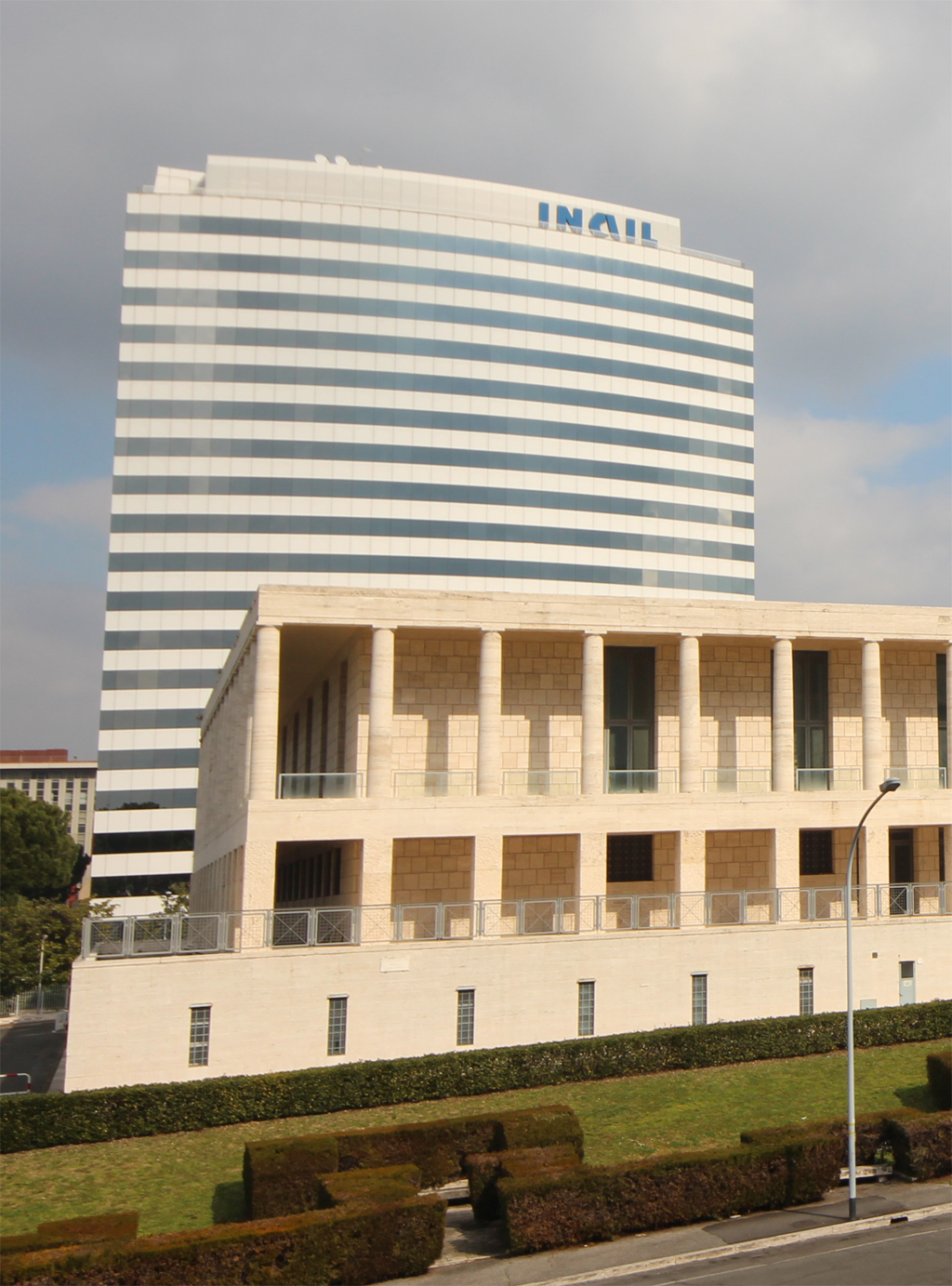
- Interactive map of the INAIL Tower area

General information
- Status: Completed
- Type: Office
- Location: Rome, Italy
- Completed: 1965

Height
- Height: 72 m (236 ft)

Technical details
- Floor count: 21

INAIL Tower also Palazzo INAIL; former as Torre Alitalia, Torre IBM is a skyscraper in Rome, Italy. Has 72 metres and 21 floors. Today, it is one of tallest buildings in the city. Lies within EUR. It is the headquarters of the National Institute for Insurance against Accidents at Work.

Built in 1965, was a vertical 19-storey building, 72 metres high, as the seat of the national airline - Alitalia, commonly called "Torre Alitalia" or "Alitalia Skyscraper". It was purchased in the mid-eighties by IBM company, which faced serious problems related to aging and to the safety of the building: very high energy consumption and inadequate fire safety measures. In addition, several components of the facade were built using asbestos and had to be dismantled. After taking into consideration the idea to demolish the tower, was a competition for the refurbishment of the building. Architect Gino Valle was assigned the project and redesigned the façade (the building is recognizable by its blue-white colour and its "bulges" on both sides), along with the interior spaces and facilities. The building was also appreciated from an aesthetic point of view as the "lightness of reflective facades and curved, in contrast with the travertine base", the typical stone of historical buildings in Rome.

== See also ==
- List of tallest buildings in Rome
