= Torre Europarco =

Coordinates: 41°49′02″N 12°27′22″E

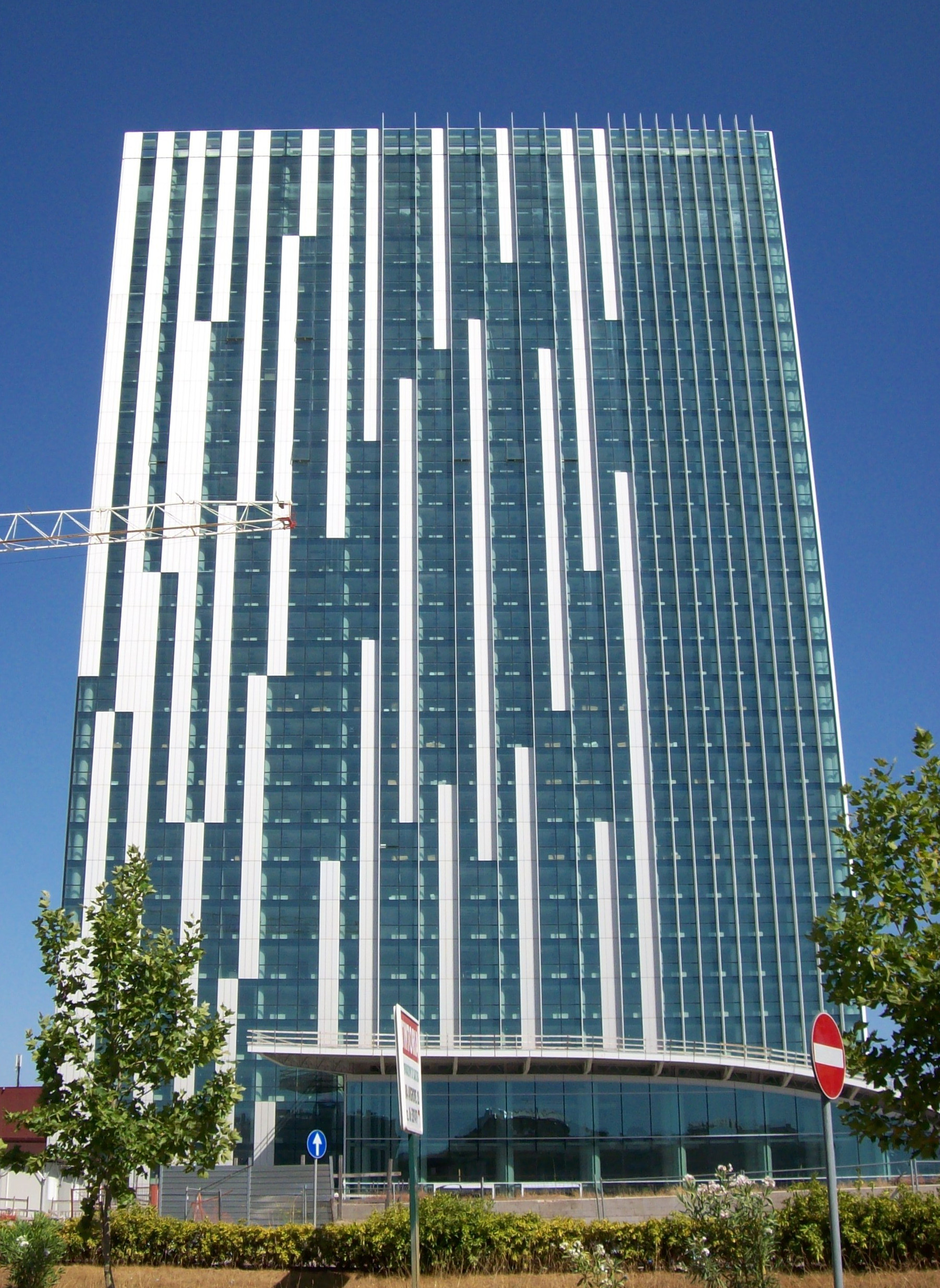
- Torre Europarco in 2012
- Interactive map of the Torre Europarco area

General information
- Status: Completed
- Location: Rome, Italy
- Completed: 2012

Height
- Height: 120 m (394 ft)

Technical details
- Floor count: 30

Design and construction
- Architect: Studio Transit

Torre Europarco (English: "Europarco Tower") is a high-rise building in Rome, Italy. It is 120 metres high and has 30 floors. It is the third-tallest building in the city, after the nearby Torre Eurosky and St. Peter's Basilica. It lies within the Europarco Business Park in Torrino, part of Rome's ninth Municipio, and borders the EUR quarter.

== See also ==
- List of tallest buildings in Rome
