= Genius of Fascism =

Sculpture by Italo Griselli

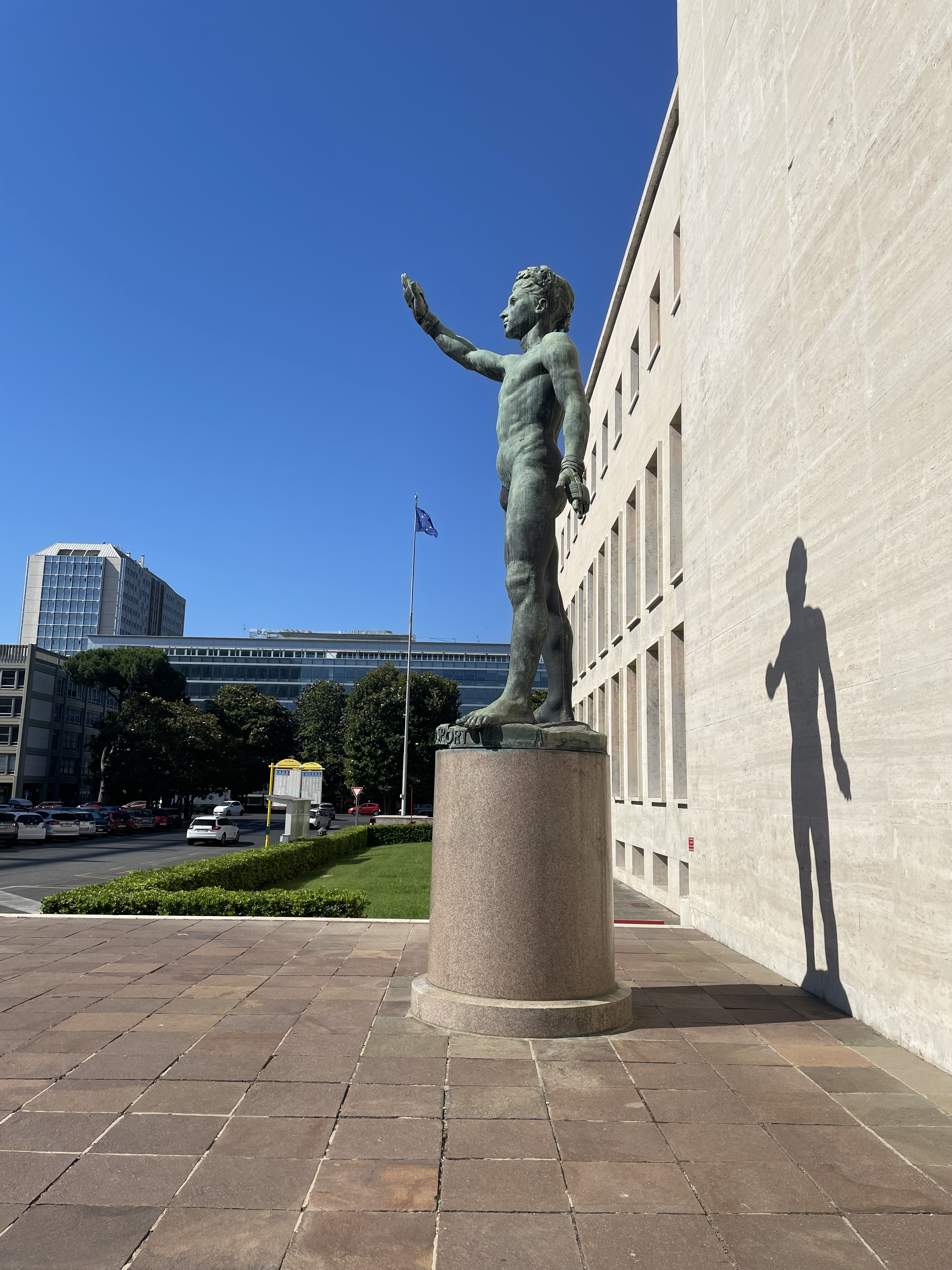
- Artist: Italo Griselli
- Year: 1939
- Location: Rome, Italy; 41°50′12″N 12°28′08″E

Genius of Fascism is a statue from 1939 by the Italian sculptor Italo Griselli. It is located outside the Palazzo degli Uffici in the EUR district of Rome, Italy. In 1952, the supervisor of the district, Virgilio Testa, renamed the statue Genius of Sport. Cestuses were then added to the hands of the figure.

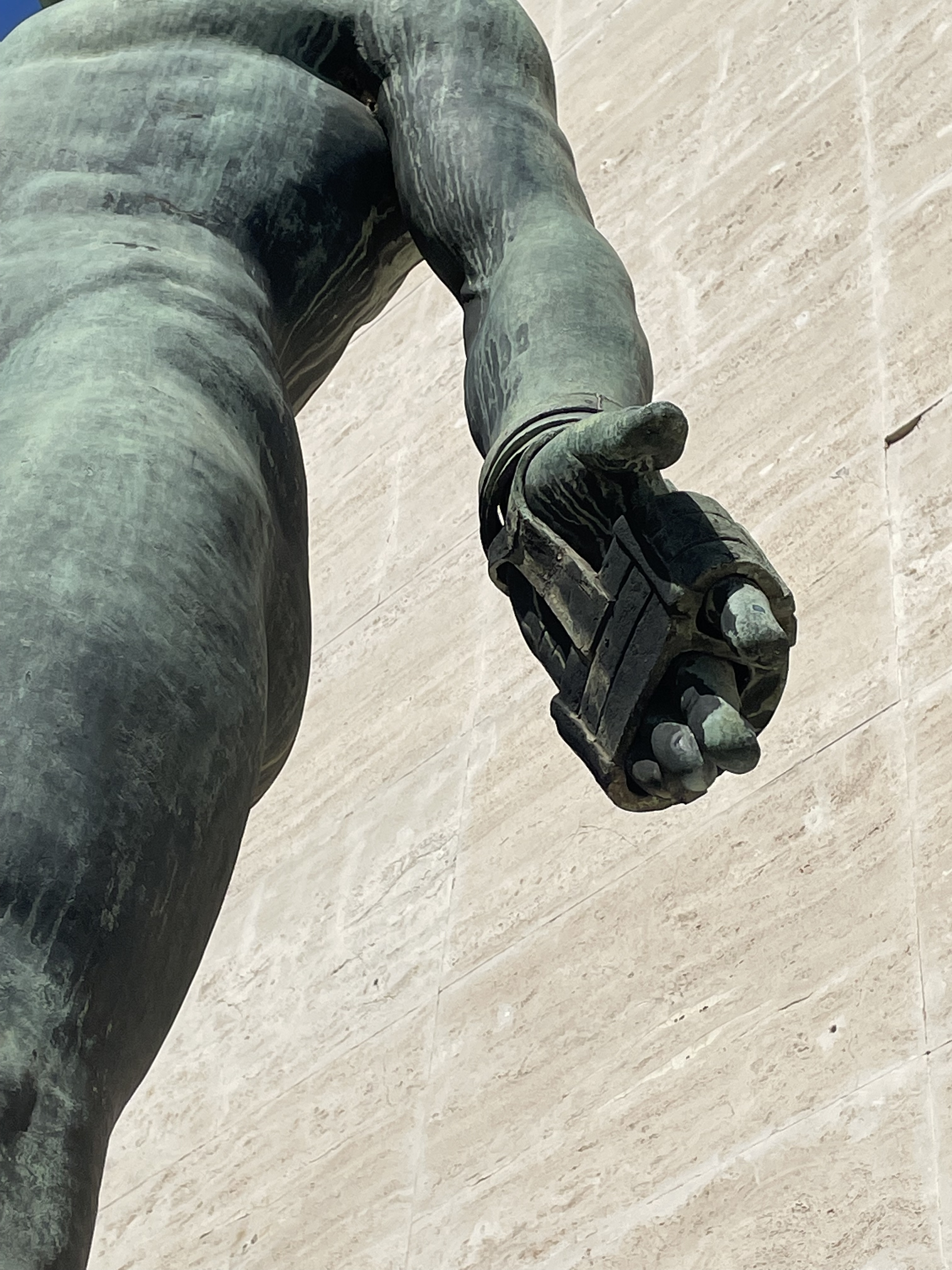
Detail of hand
