= Franco Purini =

Italian architect and essayist (born 1941)

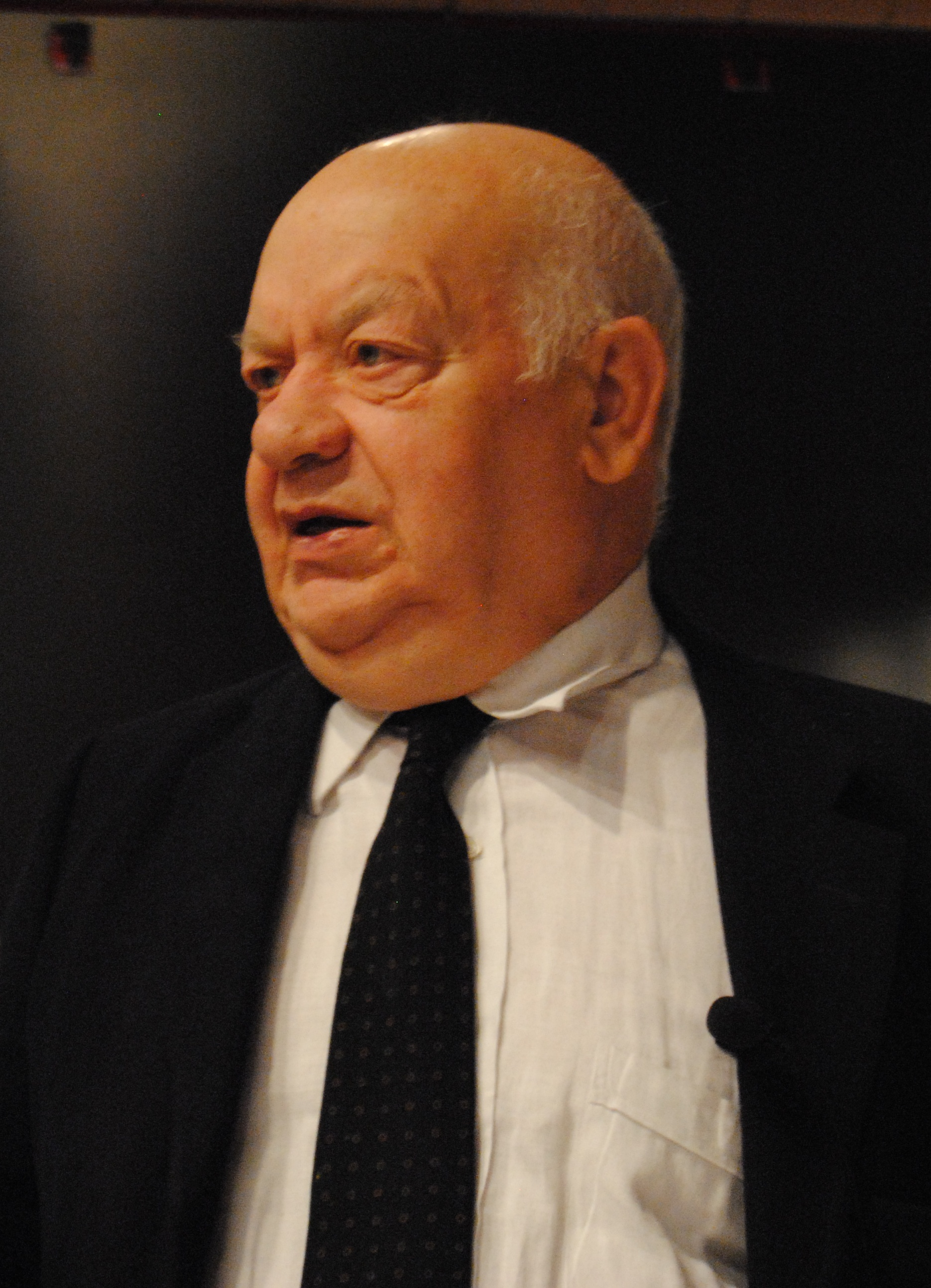
- Franco Purini in 2012
- Born: November 9, 1941 (age 84); Isola del Liri, Lazio, Italy
- Occupation: Architect

Franco Purini, born as Francesco Purini (Isola del Liri, 9 November 1941), is an Italian architect, essayist, and university professor. He has designed many buildings, including the Torre Eurosky in Rome.

He studied architecture in Rome with Ludovico Quaroni, earning his degree in 1971, spending his free time in the company of Franco Libertucci, Achille Perilli, and Lorenzo Taiuti.

After his first work experience with Maurizio Sacripanti and Vittorio Gregotti, starting in 1969 mainly in Florence and Cosenza Universities, he joined the workshop "Belice 80" and after a brief period of teaching in Reggio Calabria and Rome he became a professor at the IUAV, University of Architecture in Venice. From 2003, he has taught at the La Sapienza University in Rome.

For his accomplishments in his field, as an architect and theoretician, he was elected Accademico Corrispondente in the Academy of Arts and Drawings of Florence.

Starting in 1966 he established a long life collaboration in Rome with his wife Laura Thermes, with whom he participated to the Biennale of Venice and the Triennale of Milan.

In 1980 he was one of the architects called by Paolo Portoghesi to the Biennale of Venice to participate in the installation "Venezia Novissima" that became a manifesto of post modern architecture.

His projects consist of dense patterns of lines and cross references. His structures echo rationalism and classical tradition, with clear citations of Maurizio Sacripanti and Giovan Battista Piranesi, which refer to the splendour of a metaphysic character.
