= Istituto nazionale per l'assicurazione contro gli infortuni sul lavoro =

Statutory corporation overview
- Formed: 1933; 92 years ago
- Jurisdiction: Government of Italy
- Headquarters: EUR district, Rome
- Employees: 9,261
- Statutory corporation executives: Franco Bettoni, President; Andrea Tardiola, General director
- Parent department: Ministry of Labour and Social Policies
- Website: www.inail.it

The Istituto nazionale per l'assicurazione contro gli infortuni sul lavoro ('National Institute for Insurance against Accidents at Work'), or INAIL, is an Italian statutory corporation overseen by the Ministry of Labour and Social Policies. Its headquarters is in the INAIL Tower in the EUR, Rome.

== History ==
Established with royal decree n. 264 of 23 March 1933 n. 264, the Istituto nazionale fascista per l'assicurazione contro gli infortuni sul lavoro or INFAIL ('National Fascist Institute for Insurance against Workplace Accidents') had the purpose to defend victims of workplace accidents via mandatory insurances. INFAIL, a merger of Cassa nazionale infortuni ('National Fund for Accidents') and Casse private di assicurazione ('Private Funds of Insurance'), expanded the number of insured events during the years and adsorbed minor entities which managed the accidents insurance for specific categories of workers. The agency's headquarters building, buttressing Quirinal Hill in Rome, was built between 1928 and 1934 on a design by Armando Brasini.

After the fall of Fascism in Italy, INFAIL was renamed in INAIL.

In 1965 the fundamental principles of accidents insurance in Italy were collected in a consolidated law expanded by following modifications. In the nineties, INAIL had acquired the activity of information, consulting and assistance in the field of safety and health in workplaces.

In 1999, the insurance became mandatory of housewives or men of house (between 18 and 65 years old) working not occasionally, for free and without constraints of subordination, caring for their families and their homes.

In 2000 INAIL received more tasks and the protection has been extended up to include the psychophysical integrity of an injured worker (the reference is to the permanent biological injury) and accidents during the home-workplace-home path. The insurance had been furthermore extended to para-subordinated workers, managers and professional sportsmen.

In 2010 INAIL absorbed the functions of the Istituto superiore per la prevenzione e la sicurezza del lavoro (ISPESL 'Higher Institute for Prevention and Safety at Work') and of the Istituto di previdenza per il settore marittimo (IPSEMA, 'Social security institute for the maritime sector'). Then, INAIL has become a single national centre for prevention, security and research regarding safety in workplaces.

== Laws and tasks ==
All laws regarding INAIL are included in the decree of the President of the Italian Republic n. 1124 of 30 June 1965. From the entry into force of this decree, accidents in workplaces is insured along with the professional disease, intended as the event harmful for the worker acting on his abilities and which originates from non-violent causes (unlike the injury) related with the working activity.

The insurance with INAIL is mandatory: if there are the conditions required by law, employers have to pay every year and insurance prize, calculated with the multiplication of the rate related to the effective risk of which insured subjects are subjected with a one thousandthed of their total retributions. The prize changes according to the type of business and employees.

INAIL verifies the compliance with laws of businesses through inspections done autonomously or jointly with the Istituto nazionale della previdenza sociale (INPS), Servizio per la prevenzione e la sicurezza negli ambienti di lavoro (SPSAL), regional and territorial work directorates, the group of Carabinieri for the protection of labour and the Guardia di Finanza.

With the payment of the insurance prize, INAIL takes the economic burden resulting from accidents at work and professional diseases which can hit employees and all the other equated figures, subjected to the mandatory insurance, both for the temporary absolute disability (the period of absence from work) and the eventual residual permanent disability. If the employer does not pay the insurance prizes not complying to the law, the employee has however the access to the protection according to the principle of the automaticity of services.

The payment of the prize exonerates the employer from the civil responsibility but he is required to respond only in case of an acknowledged fault with a final judgment of the magistrate. If the prize is not paid in time or it is unpaid, civil penalties are applied.

The mandatory participation into INAIL has the purpose of protecting the worker who, having a different retribution from that of his employer, will not have economical risks (e.g. due to bankruptcy of the company where he works) and other risks derived from his particular situation where he is (the employer could be in a privileged position).

INAIL does activities regarding prevention of accidents, research (after the merger with ISPESL) and rehabilitation of injured workers also with its own prothesis centre in Budrio.

INAIL promotes the adoption of measures in favour of the safety at work, including incentives for supporting businesses, or ISI (Incentivi di Sostegno alle Imprese). With this funds, employers can develop projects related to the reduction of risks of accidents and professional diseases among with the introduction of new safety system for higher standards of health.

=== Insurance for work at home ===
INAIL, along with the insurance and protection of workers, has extended the mandatory insurance for whom, male or female with age between 18 and 67 years old, has an exclusive, not occasional, free work without subordination constraints and dedicated on the care of the family and the house. The annual prize, at insured charge, is €12.91. The insurance covers accidents occurred in the home environment in occasion and for that kind of activities which lead to death or the permanent disability equal or higher than 16%. For those citizens who had declared for the last year an annual income of less than €4,648.11, thus those belonging to a family unit with a total income not more than €9,296.22, the prize is paid by the State itself.

== Constitutional and legal status of INAIL insurance monopoly ==
INAIL operates its insurance function in a monopoly regime guaranteed by law but often the political opportunity of that condition has been questioned along with its lawfulness, referring to its compatibility with the Community law.

In 2000, the Radicals guided by Marco Pannella and Emma Bonino collected and presented to the Constitutional Court 16 million signatures to propose a referendum on about twenty questions, including the "abolition of the monopoly of INAIL", in which citizens were asked if they agreed on the liberalization of the trade of agency for security at work. The Constitutional Court reject much of the instances made by Radicals, reducing to seven the number of questions for the referendum and cancelling the one for the abolition of the monopoly of INAIL. However, the sentence stated that:

The "Constitutional law gives full freedom to the State to choose the manner, the forms, the organizational structures considered more suitable and efficient for the purpose", always if the choice of them is such to constitute a "full guarantee, for employees, to the achievement of social security services to which they are entitled, without generating imbalances and inequalities 4. - Having said that on the constitutional and legislative level, the Court, referring to its own jurisprudence on the grounds of inadmissibility of the referendum, observes that in that case the referendum instrument appears unsuitable to reach the mentioned purpose of the proponents as objectified in the question, since that the same is not likely to be achieved due to the simple partial repeal of the existing legislation, but it would require a complex legislative operation to transform this structure.

In 2002, the Court of Justice of the European Union declared the compatibility of the regime of INAIL with the principles of the Treaty regarding the freedom of competition, as it was considered that this entity did not carry out business activities.

In 2011, the liberist think tank Istituto Bruno Leoni relaunched the proposal for the abolition of the monopoly of INAIL.

== See also ==
- Ministry of Labour and Social Policies (Italy)
- Istituto nazionale della previdenza sociale
- European Agency for Safety and Health at Work
- Workers' compensation
