= Torre Eurosky =

Skyscraper in Rome

Coordinates: 41.81959°N 12.45763°E

- Torre Eurosky in 2011
- Interactive map of the Torre Eurosky area

General information
- Type: Commercial - residential
- Location: Rome, Italy
- Construction started: 2010
- Completed: 2012
- Opened: 2013

Height
- Antenna spire: 800,000 m^{2} (8,600,000 sq ft)

Technical details
- Floor count: 35
- Floor area: 800.000 mq²

Design and construction
- Architect: Franco Purini
- Main contractor: Parsitalia s.r.l.

Website
- euroskyroma.it/en/

Torre Eurosky (or Eurosky Tower) is a skyscraper in Rome, Italy. It is the tallest building in Rome and one of the highest residential towers in Italy.

== Description ==
Designed by architect Franco Purini, and located in Torrino, residential area adjacent to the EUR, Torre Eurosky is inspired by the medieval towers that dot the center of the city—foremost among which is the Torre delle Milizie.

== See also ==
- List of tallest buildings in Rome

Records
Preceded by St. Peter's Basilica	Tallest building in Rome; 2012–current 155 metres (509 ft)	Succeeded by
