= EUR, Rome =

EUR
- District
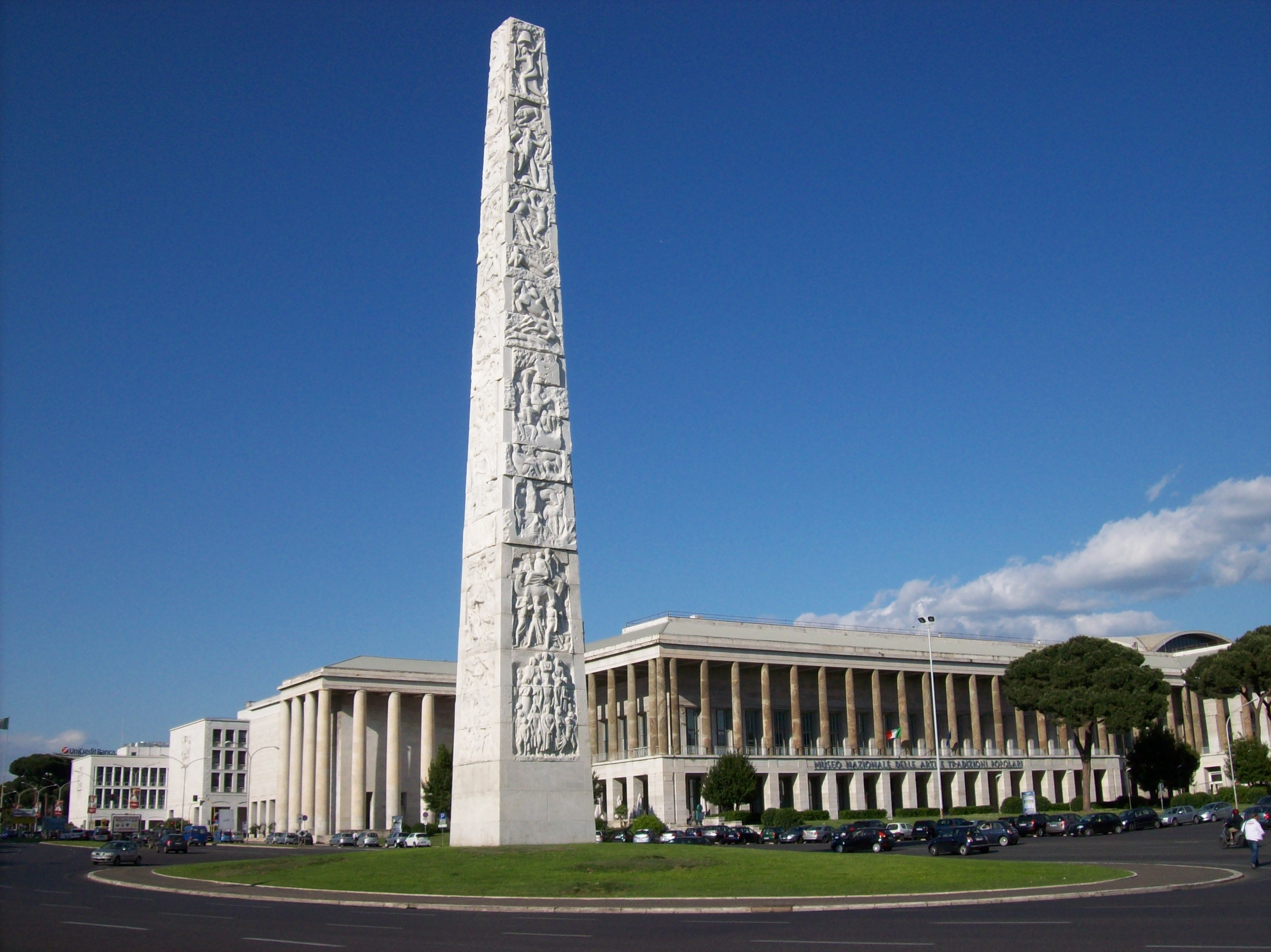
- Piazza Guglielmo Marconi and the Marconi Obelisk
- Interactive map of EUR
- Coordinates: 41°50′01″N 12°28′15″E
- Country: Italy
- Region: Lazio
- City: Rome
- Municipio: Municipio IX
- Founded: 26 April 1937

Area
  - Total: 0.4 km^{2} (0.15 sq mi)

Population (2016)
  - Total: 9,416
- Time zone: UTC+01:00
- Website: www.eurspa.it/en

EUR is a residential area and the major business district in Rome, Italy, part of Municipio IX.

It is considered Rome’s business district.

The area was originally chosen in the 1930s as the site for the 1942 World's Fair which Benito Mussolini planned to open to celebrate twenty years of Fascism, the letters EUR standing for Esposizione Universale Roma ("Rome Universal Exposition"). The project was originally called E42 after the year in which the exhibition was to be held. EUR was also designed to direct the expansion of the city towards the south-west and the sea, and to be a new city centre for Rome. The planned exhibition never took place, due to World War II.

Most of the area is the property of EUR S.p.A., a company jointly owned by the Ministry of Economy and the Metropolitan City of Rome Capital.

== History ==
The complex was planned to be home to a World's fair to celebrate the twentieth anniversary of the March on Rome and of the beginning of the Fascist era. The autonomous agency responsible for organization and construction of the project, E42 (Esposizione 1942), was created on 26 December 1936.

On 26 April 1937, Benito Mussolini planted a cluster pine at the centre of the site of the future EUR district. Ultimately, he wished to expand the Roman urban area towards the sea.

The general commissioner of the agency, Vittorio Cini, presented a list of the most prominent Italian architects available to Benito Mussolini. The list included Adalberto Libera, Enrico Del Debbio, Giuseppe Terragni, Giovanni Michelucci, Adamius, Eugenio Montuori and Giovanni Muzio. Marcello Piacentini was selected to head the project; the others chosen to contribute included Giuseppe Pagano Pogatschnig, Luigi Piccinato, Luigi Vietti and Ettore Rossi. The first project, on an area of 4 km^{2} (1.5 sq mi), was presented in 1938.

The name was later changed to EUR, and the final project was presented in 1939. The events of World War II intervened, the Expo failed to take place, and the original project was left uncompleted when the works had to stop in 1942.

During World War II the uncompleted EUR development suffered severe damage. However, the Roman authorities decided that EUR could be the basis of an out-of-town business district, which other capitals did not begin planning until decades later (for example, La Défense near Paris, and London Docklands). During the 1950s and 1960s the unfinished Fascist-era buildings were completed and other new buildings were built in contemporary styles for use as offices and government buildings, set in large gardens and parks.

EUR was almost fully completed for the 1960 Olympics, held in Rome. At that time, most of the important infrastructures, such as the Palazzo dello Sport (designed by Pier Luigi Nervi and Marcello Piacentini) and the Velodromo were completed.

The EUR development agency, founded in 1936, became a Società per azioni on 15 March 2000 and is still responsible for some aspects of management and organization of the area.

After a period of controversy over its architectural and urban planning principles, the project to design EUR was commissioned from the leaders of both of the rival factions in Italian architecture: Marcello Piacentini for the "reactionaries" and Giuseppe Pagano for the "progressives". Each of them brought in their own preferred architects to design individual buildings within the district. EUR offers a large-scale image of how urban Italy might have looked if the Fascist regime had not fallen; wide axially planned streets and austere buildings of either stile Littorio, inspired by ancient Roman architecture, or Rationalism, modern architecture but built using traditional limestone, tuff and marble.

== Architecture ==
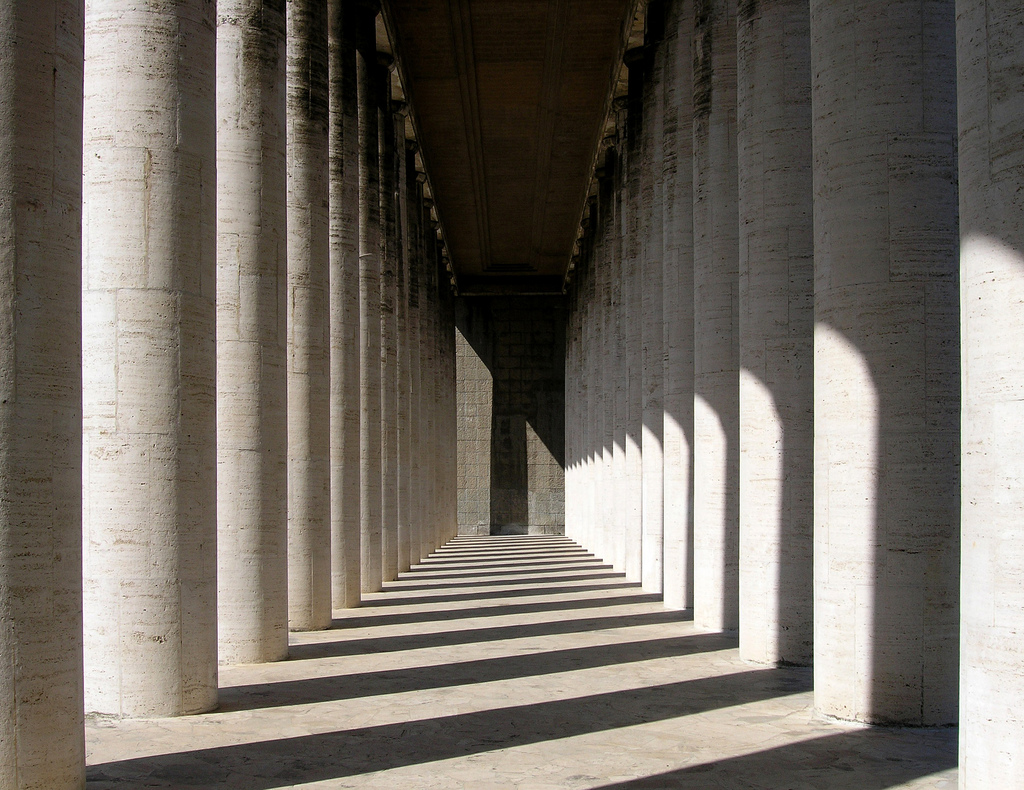
Museum of Roman Civilization, external colonnade

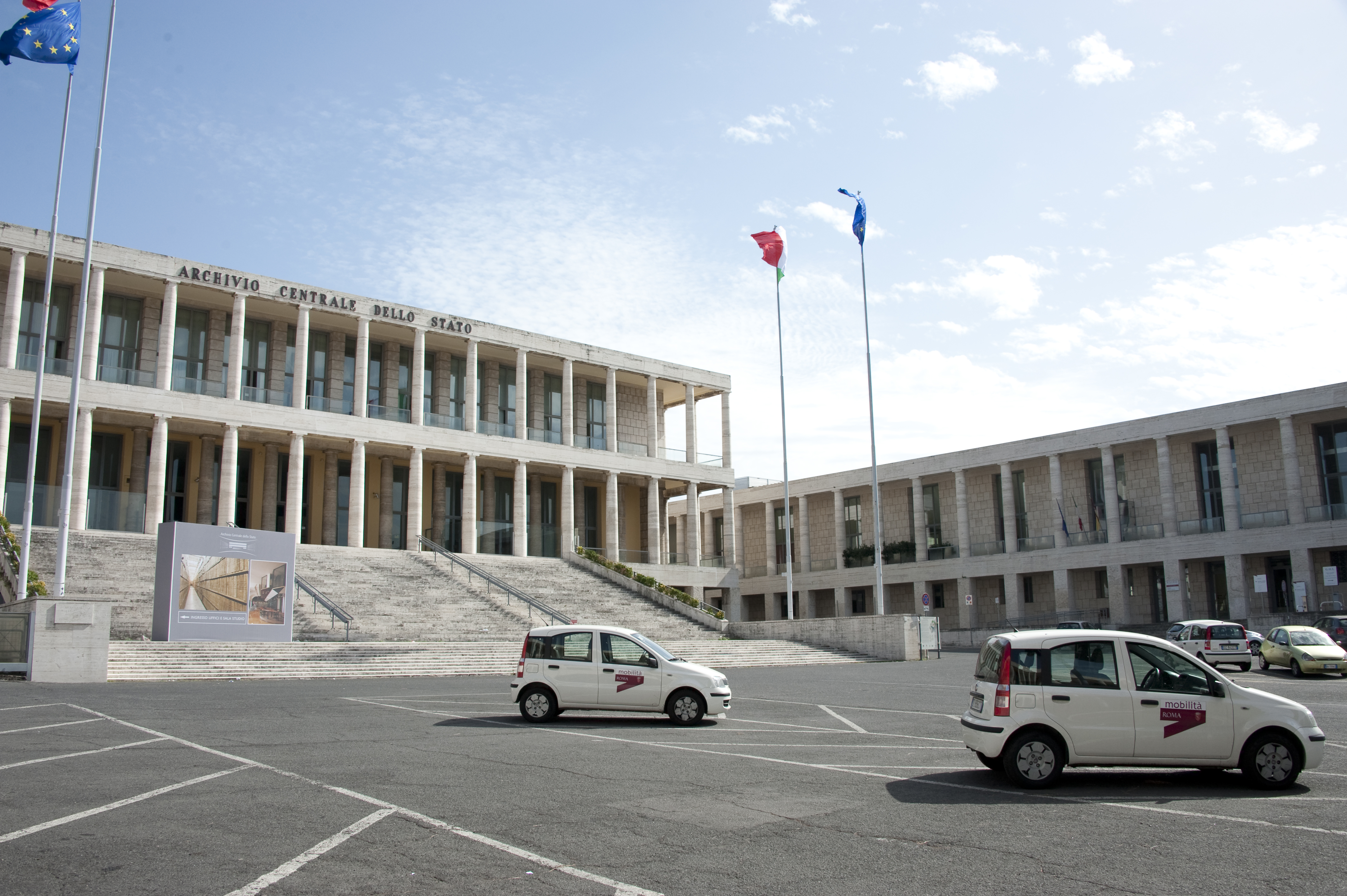
Piazza degli Archivi with Archivio Centrale dello Stato

The initial project was presented in 1938 under the direction of Marcello Piacentini. The design was inspired, as fascist ideology recommended, by Roman Imperial town planning, with modern elements which came from Italian Rationalism, the result being a sort of simplified neoclassicism.

The project develops over orthogonal axes and large and stately buildings, built mainly of limestone, tuff and marble, traditional materials associated with Roman Empire architecture.

The most representative building at EUR, and the symbol of this architectural style, is the Palazzo della Civiltà Italiana (1938–1943), an iconic project which has since become known as the "Colosseo Quadrato" (Square Colosseum). The building was designed by Giovanni Guerrini, Ernesto Lapadula and Mario Romano, also inspired by metaphysical art.

In 1938, Luigi Moretti (with Fariello, Muratori and Quaroni) won the competition for the design of the Imperial Square (now Piazza Guglielmo Marconi). The large building fronting the square was never finished, but after the war the structures already constructed were used for the "Skyscraper Italy" (Grattacielo Italia) by Luigi Mattioni.

Other notable buildings are:

- Palazzo dei Ricevimenti e dei Congressi
- Archivio Centrale dello Stato
- Basilica parrocchiale dei Santi Pietro e Paolo
- Palazzo degli Uffici, with the statue once titled Genius of Fascism
- INA palace and INPS palace

Several museums are also present. These comprise the Museum of Roman Civilization (Roman Culture Museum), the Museo Nazionale dell'Alto Medioevo (National Museum of the Middle Ages) and the Museo Nazionale Preistorico Etnografico Luigi Pigorini (Prehistoric Ethnographic Museum). A new planetarium, connected to the Astronomy Museum, opened in 2004.

== Economy ==
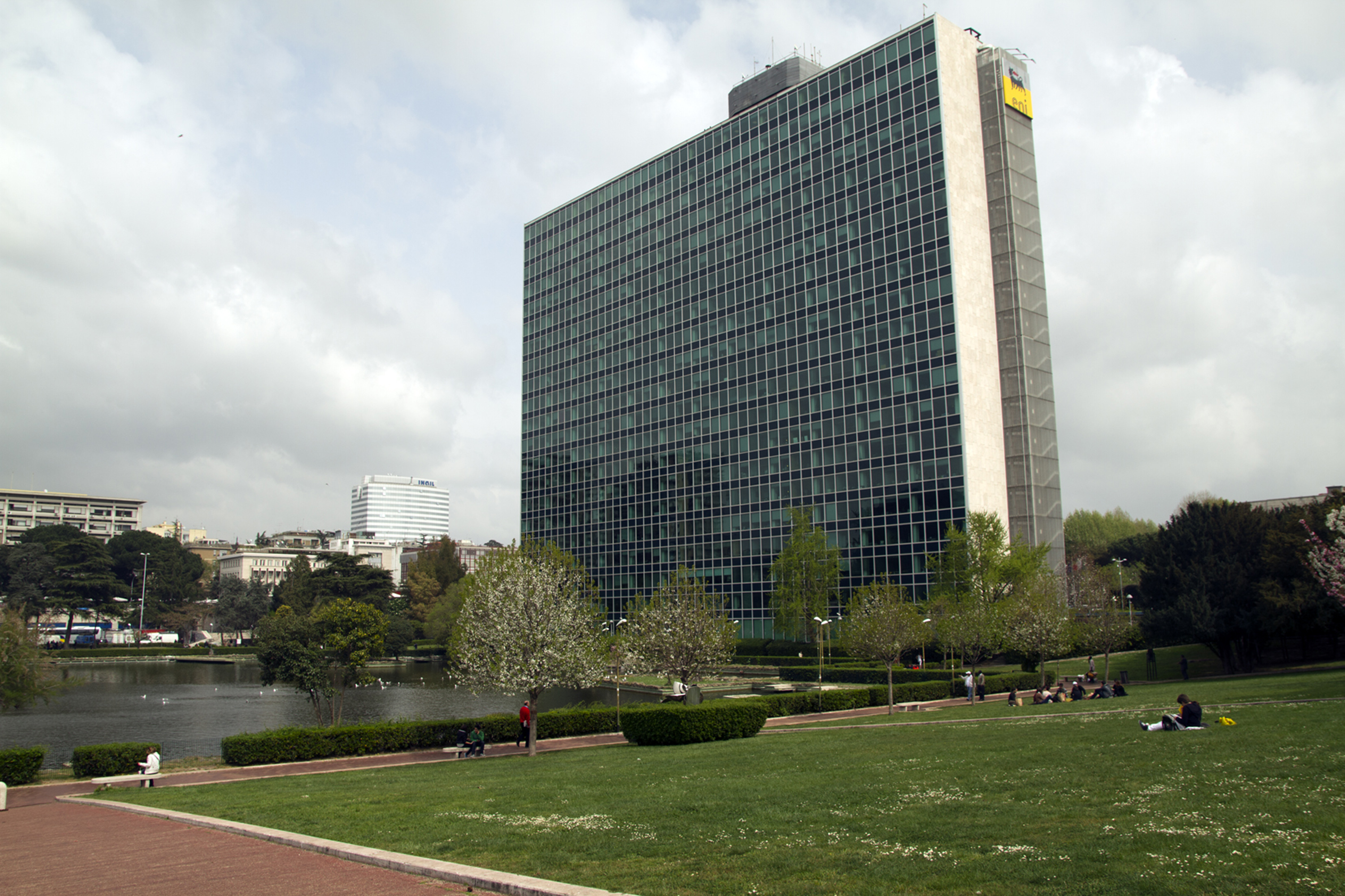
Palazzo Eni, inaugurated in 1961

EUR is the headquarters of many companies and public bodies, such as Confindustria, the Ministry of Health, the Ministry of communications, the Archivio Centrale dello Stato, the Ministry of the Environment, the SIAE, the Agenzia ICE, Eni company, UniCredit, Poste italiane, INAIL, INPS, and many other multinational companies. It also hosted the NATO Defense College from 1966 until 1999.

== Education ==
The "bibliopoint" Istituto superiore "Leon Battista Alberti" is located in the EUR. There are a lot of schools in EUR, such as Liceo Scientifico Statale "Stanislao Cannizzaro", Liceo Ginnasio Statale "Francesco Vivona", another one is ITC "Vincenzo Arangio Ruiz". Those three are all public schools; there are also private institutes, such as "Istituto Massimiliano Massimo" and Highlands Institute.

== Sport ==
- There were three aborted attempts to host a Formula 1 Grand Prix: the first in 1985 as the Grand Prix of Europe/European Grand Prix, then as the Rome GP in 2009 and 2012.
- In 2018, motor racing championship Formula E held a round on the Circuito Cittadino dell'EUR street track, a course which encompasses the ward. The race was won by Briton Sam Bird. The edition of 2022 was won by Mitch Evans for Jaguar Cars.

== In popular culture ==
The Fascist architecture of EUR was prominently featured in Michelangelo Antonioni's 1962 film L'Eclisse and Bernardo Bertolucci's 1970 film The Conformist. Additionally, multiple buildings were shown in Federico Fellini's films 8½ and Boccaccio '70.

The location was also used as the headquarters of Mayflower Industries in the 1991 movie Hudson Hawk and served as a backdrop for scenes from the 1999 film adaptation of Shakespeare's Titus Andronicus. Lara Wendel's death scene in the 1982 movie Tenebrae was also shot in the location.

Extensive portions of The Last Man on Earth were filmed in EUR.

The burial of Marco Sciarra in 007's Spectre was filmed at Museum of Roman Civilization.

== Gallery ==
=== Fascist architecture ===
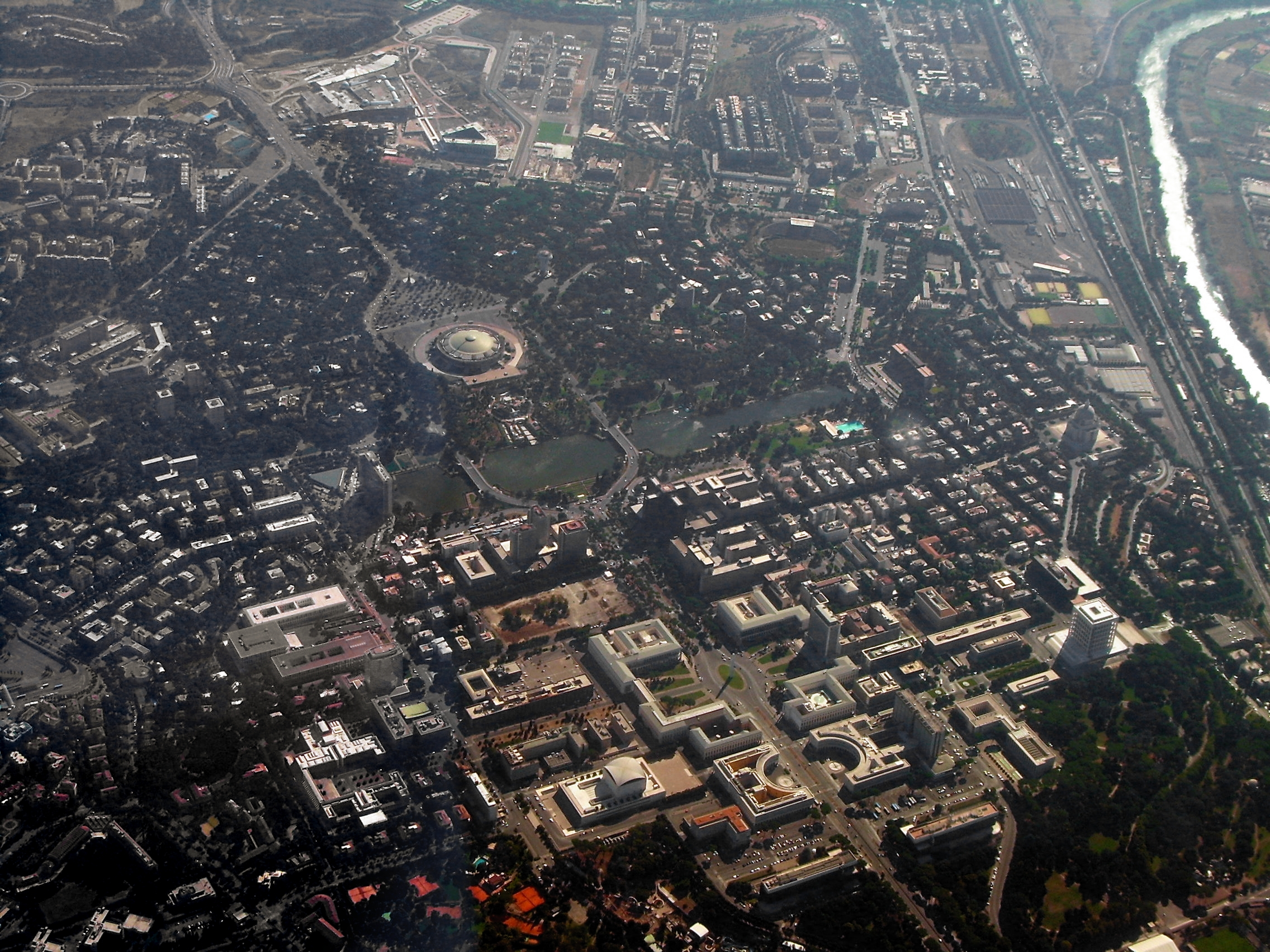
Aerial view

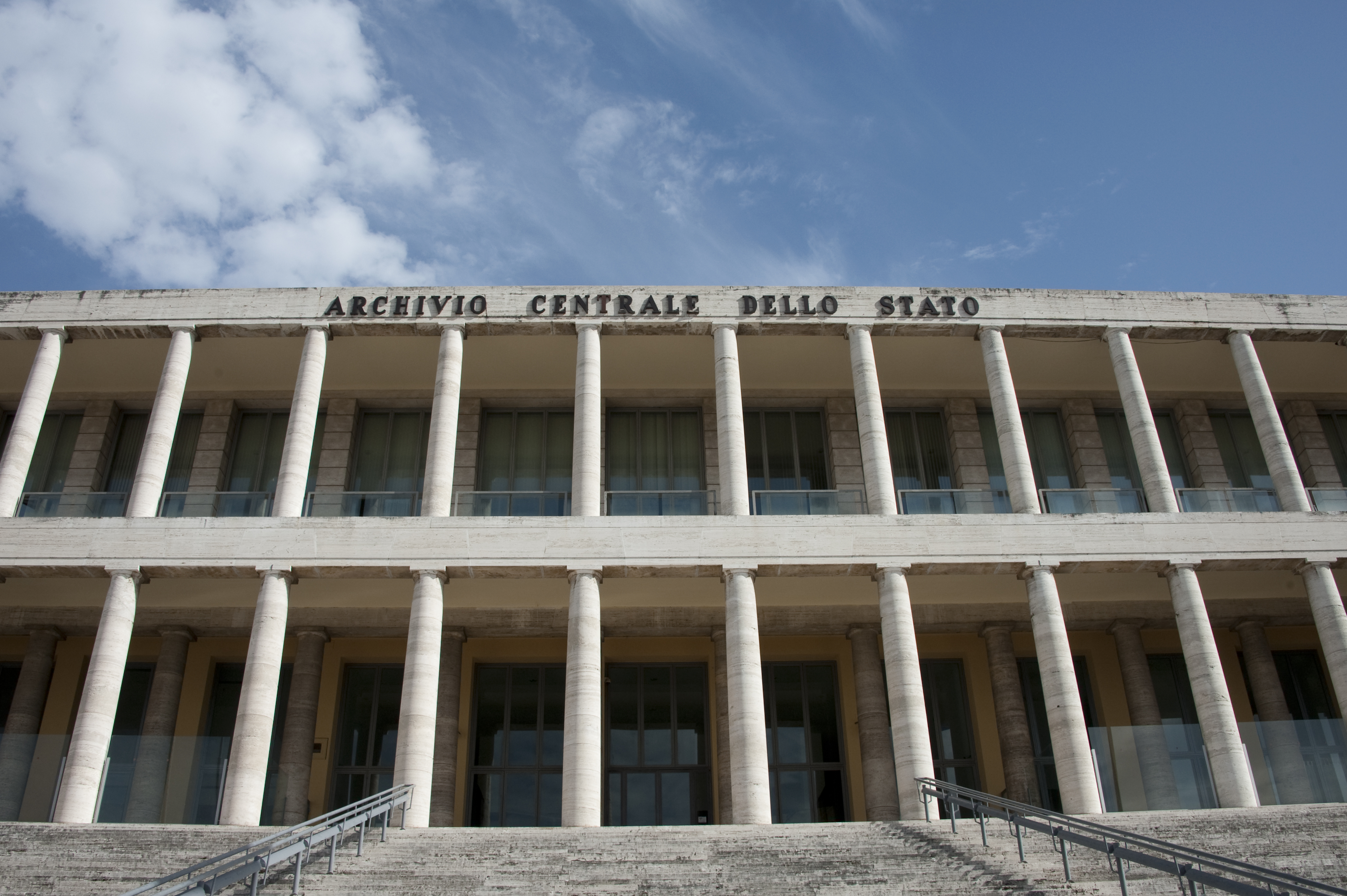
Central Archives of the State

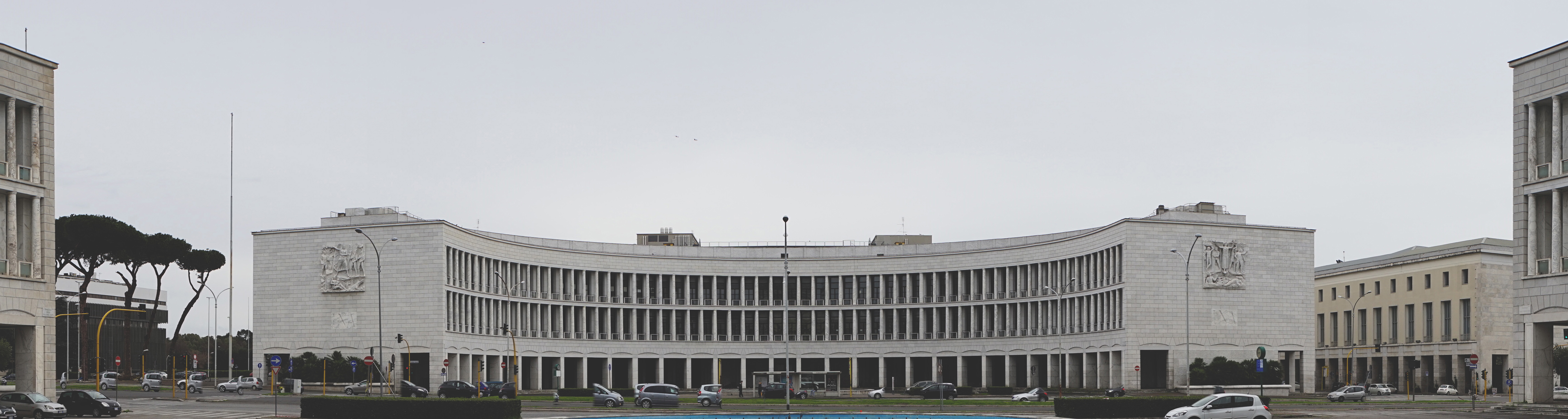
Palazzo INA

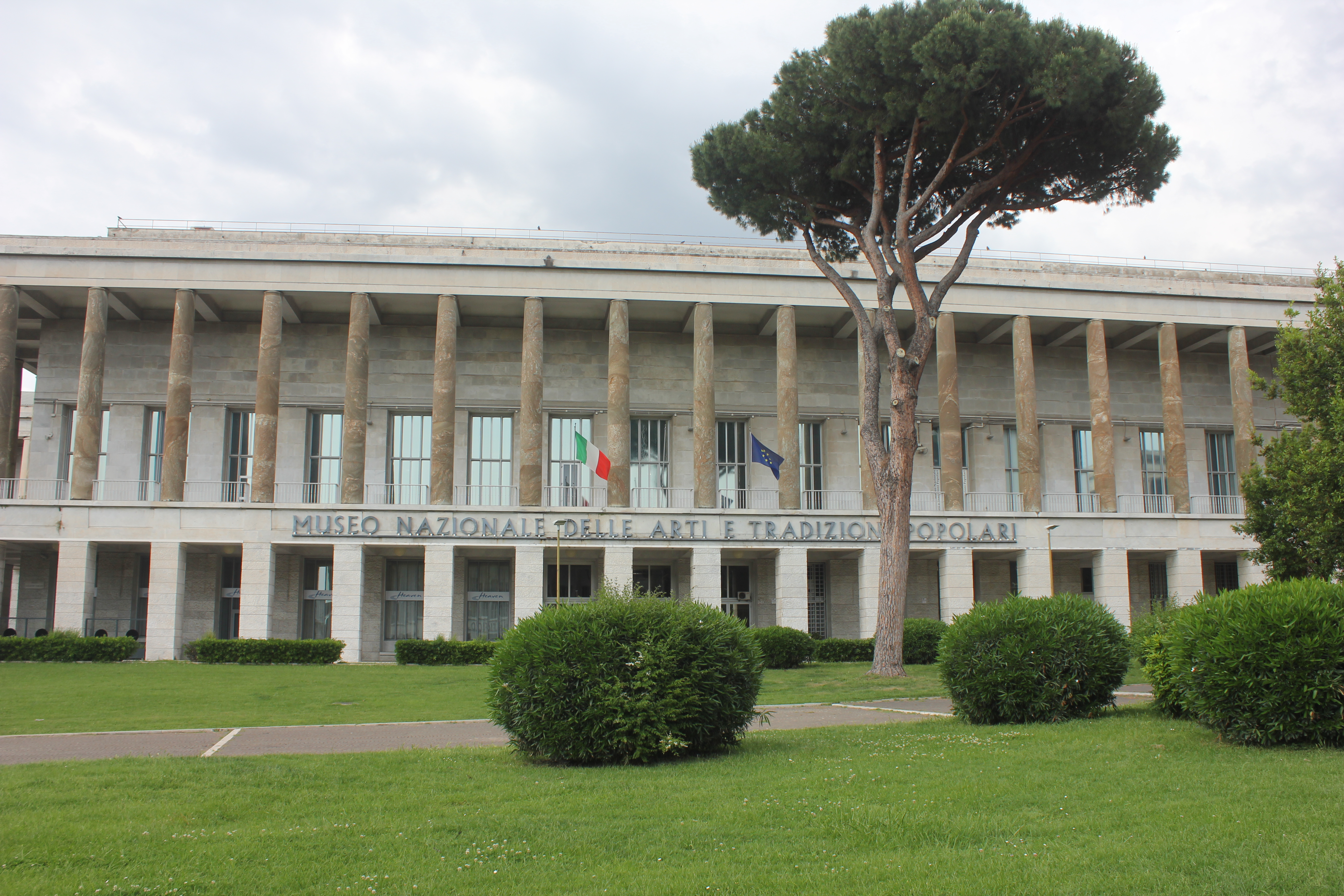
National Museum of Arts and Popular Traditions

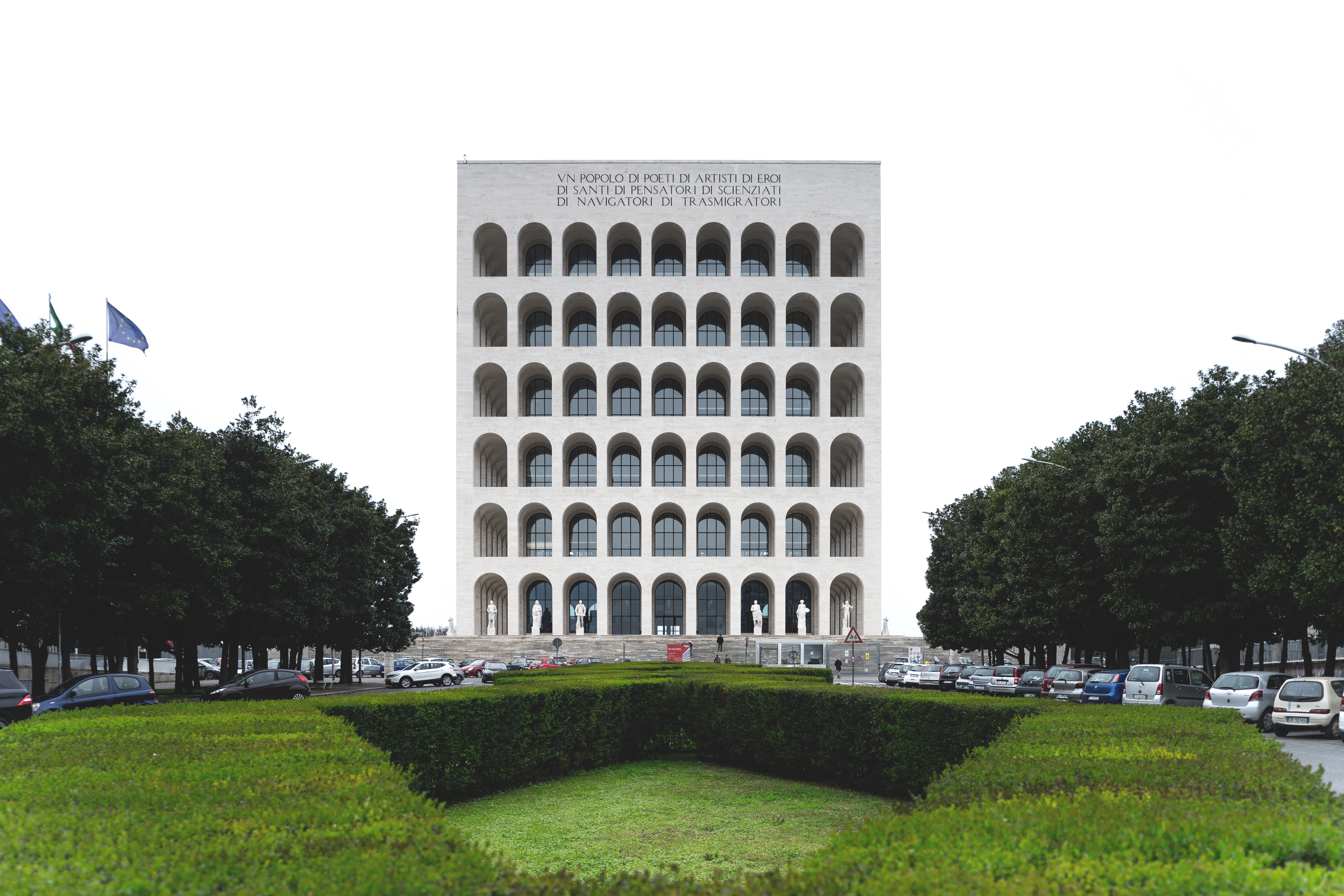
Palazzo della Civiltà Italiana

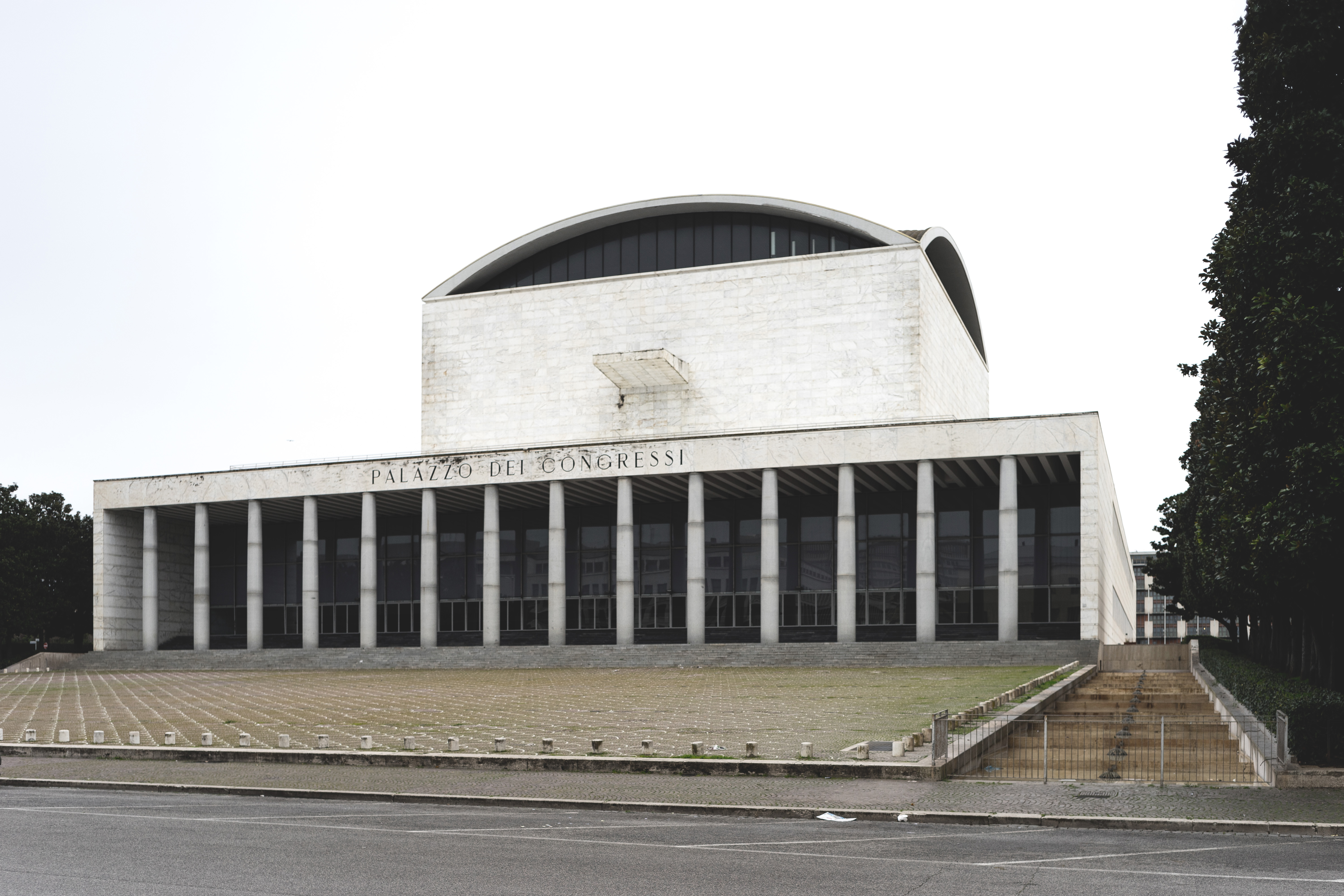
Palazzo dei Ricevimenti e Congressi

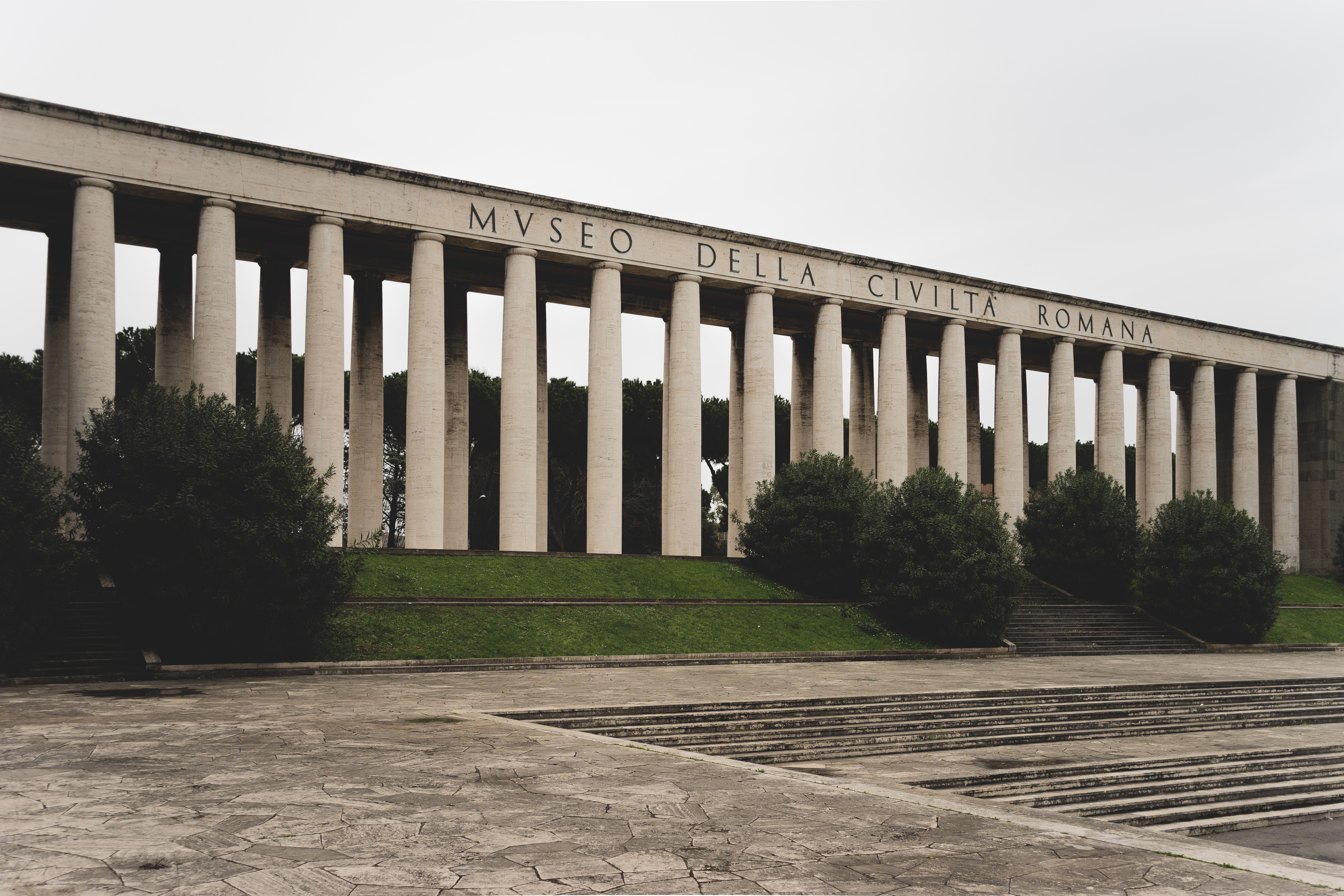
Museum of Roman Civilization

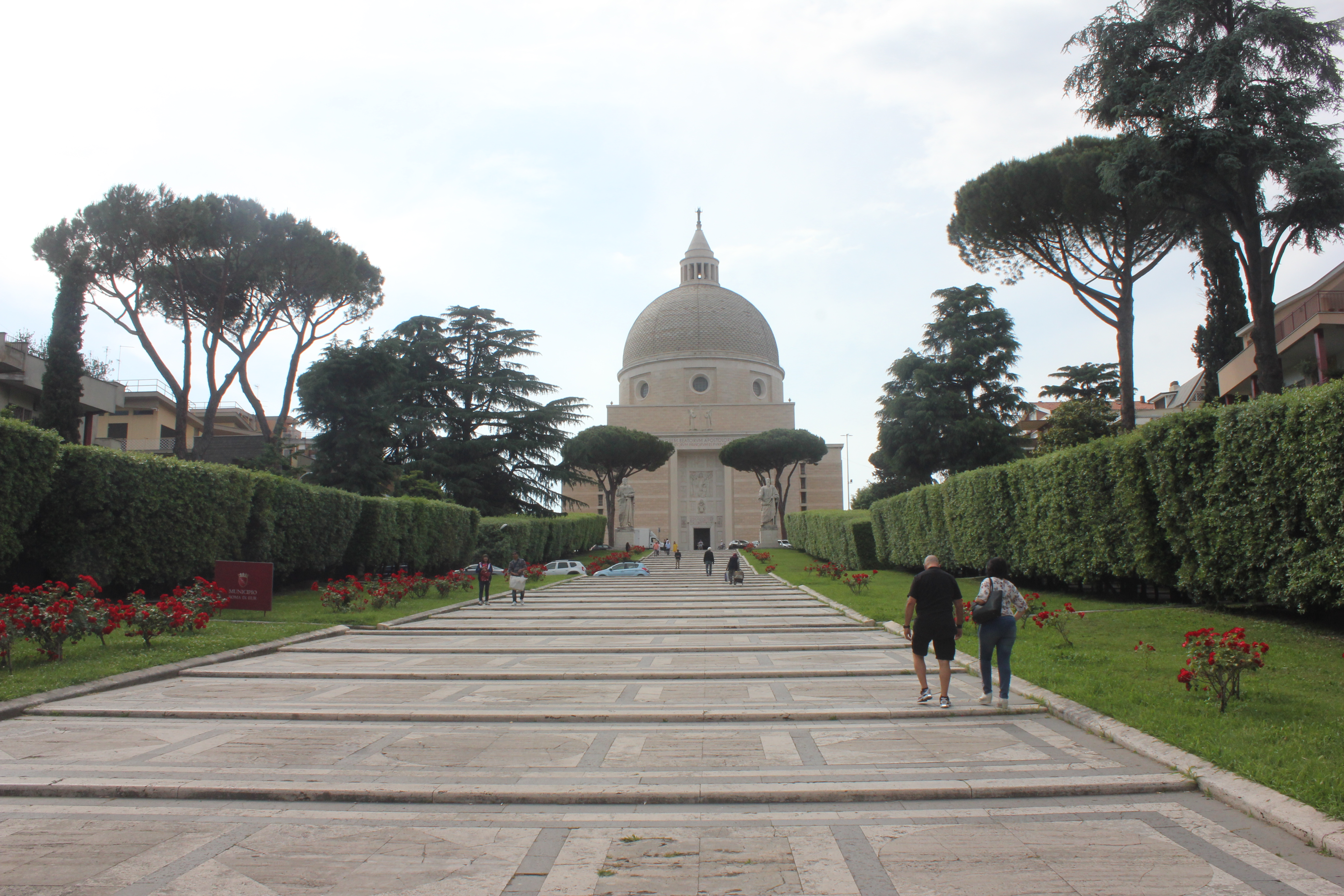
St. Peter and St. Paul Basilica

=== Post-fascist architecture ===
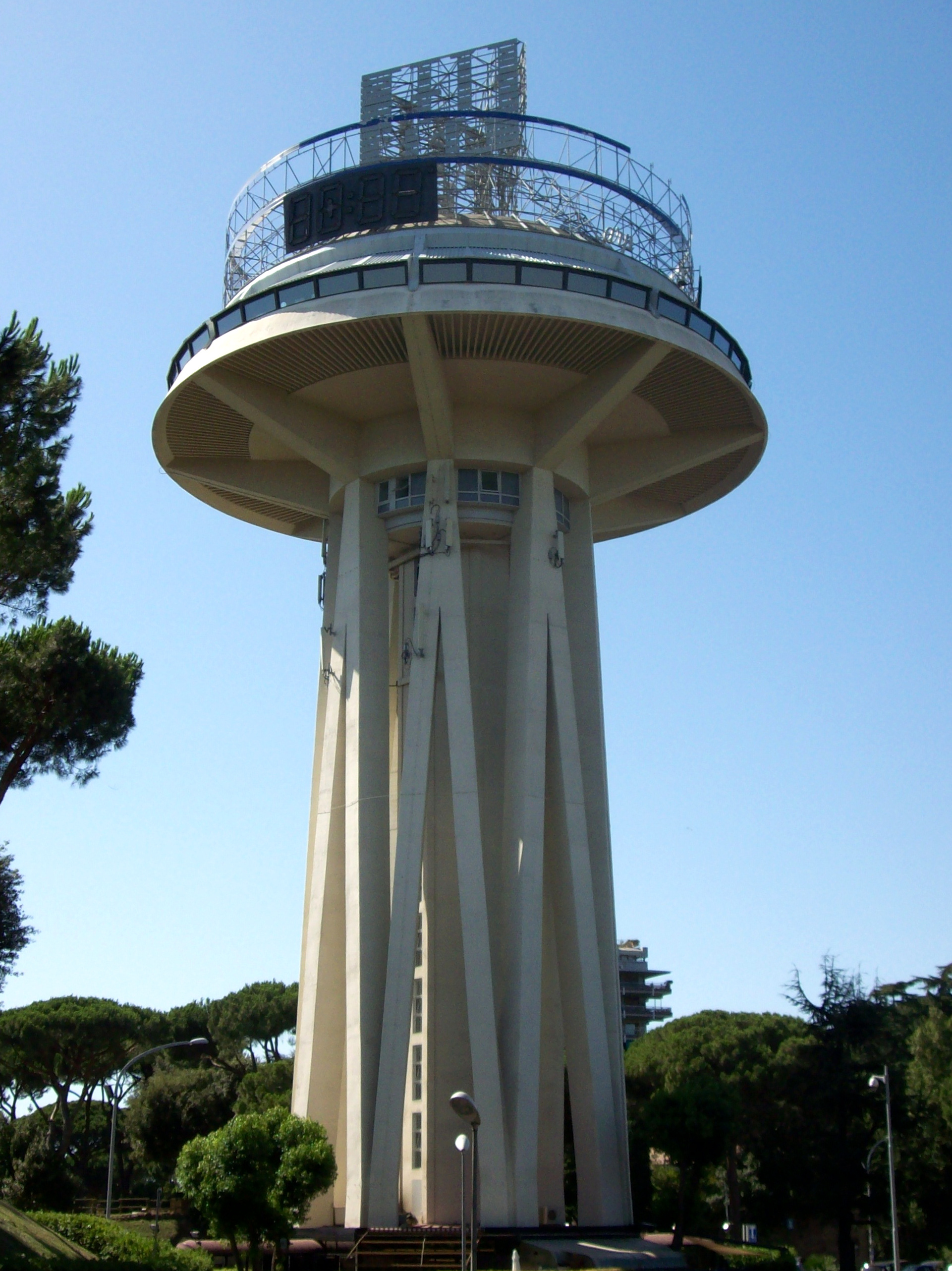
Il Fungo (The Mushroom), 1960

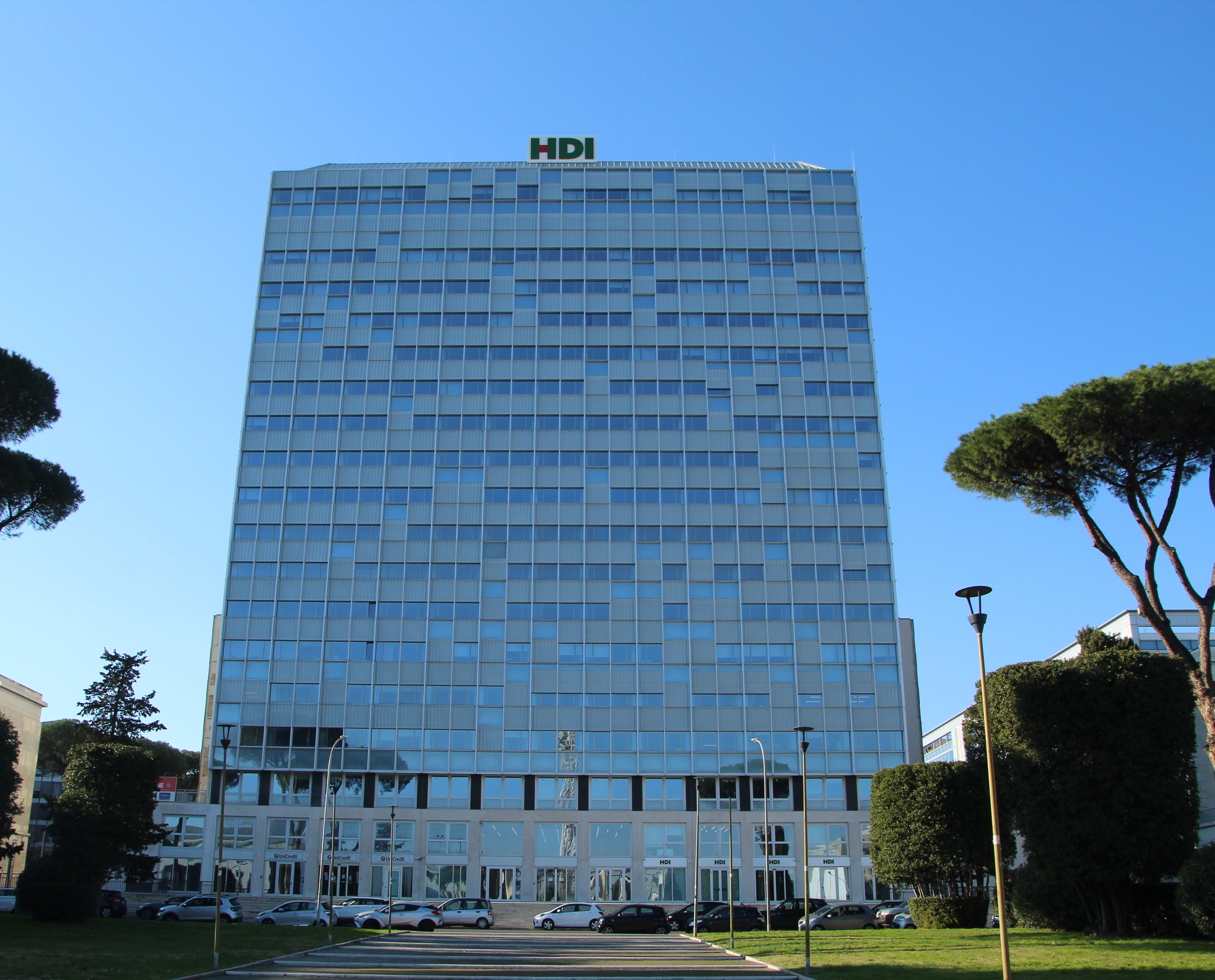
Palazzo Italia, 1960

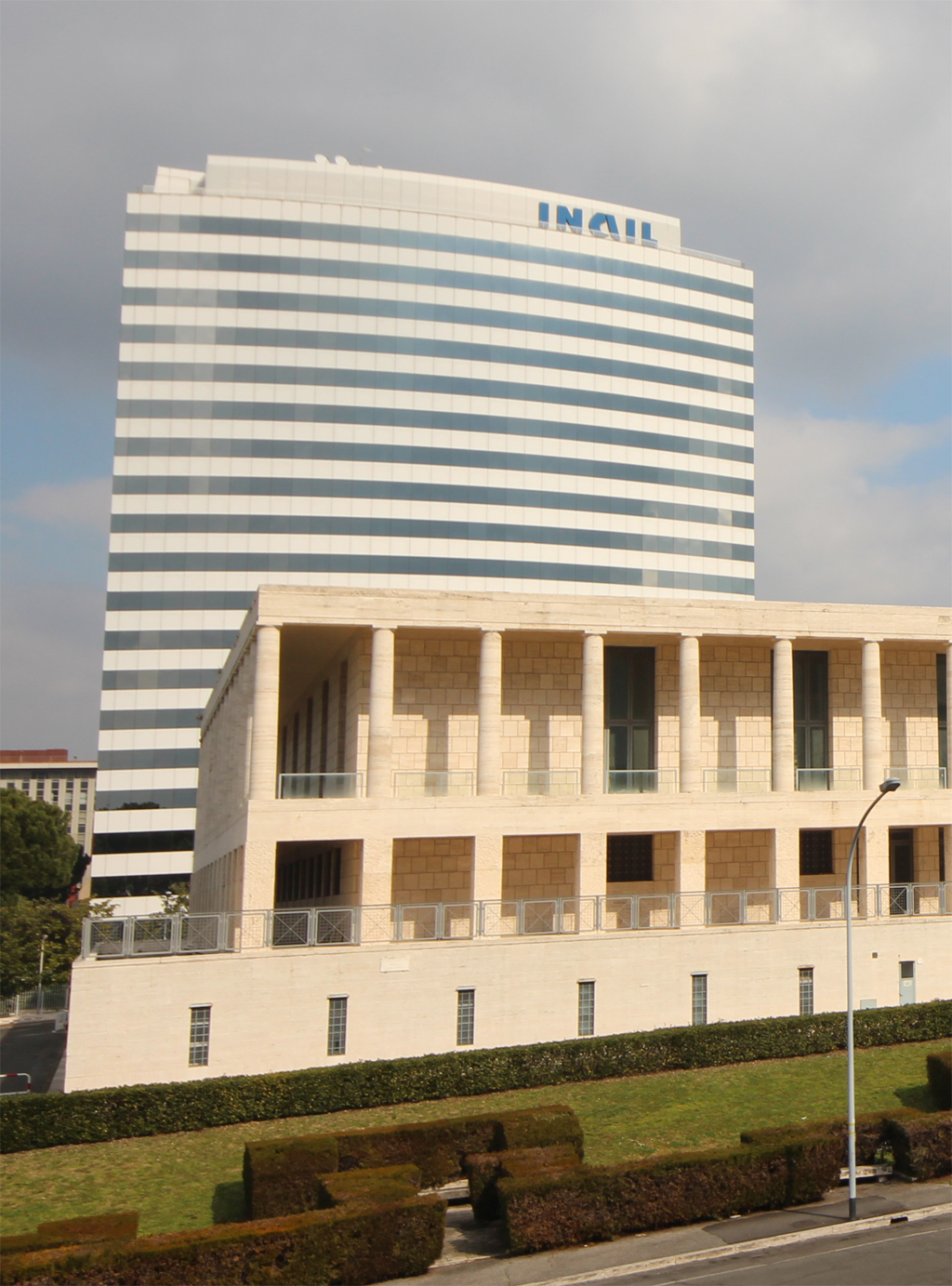
Palazzo INAIL, 1965

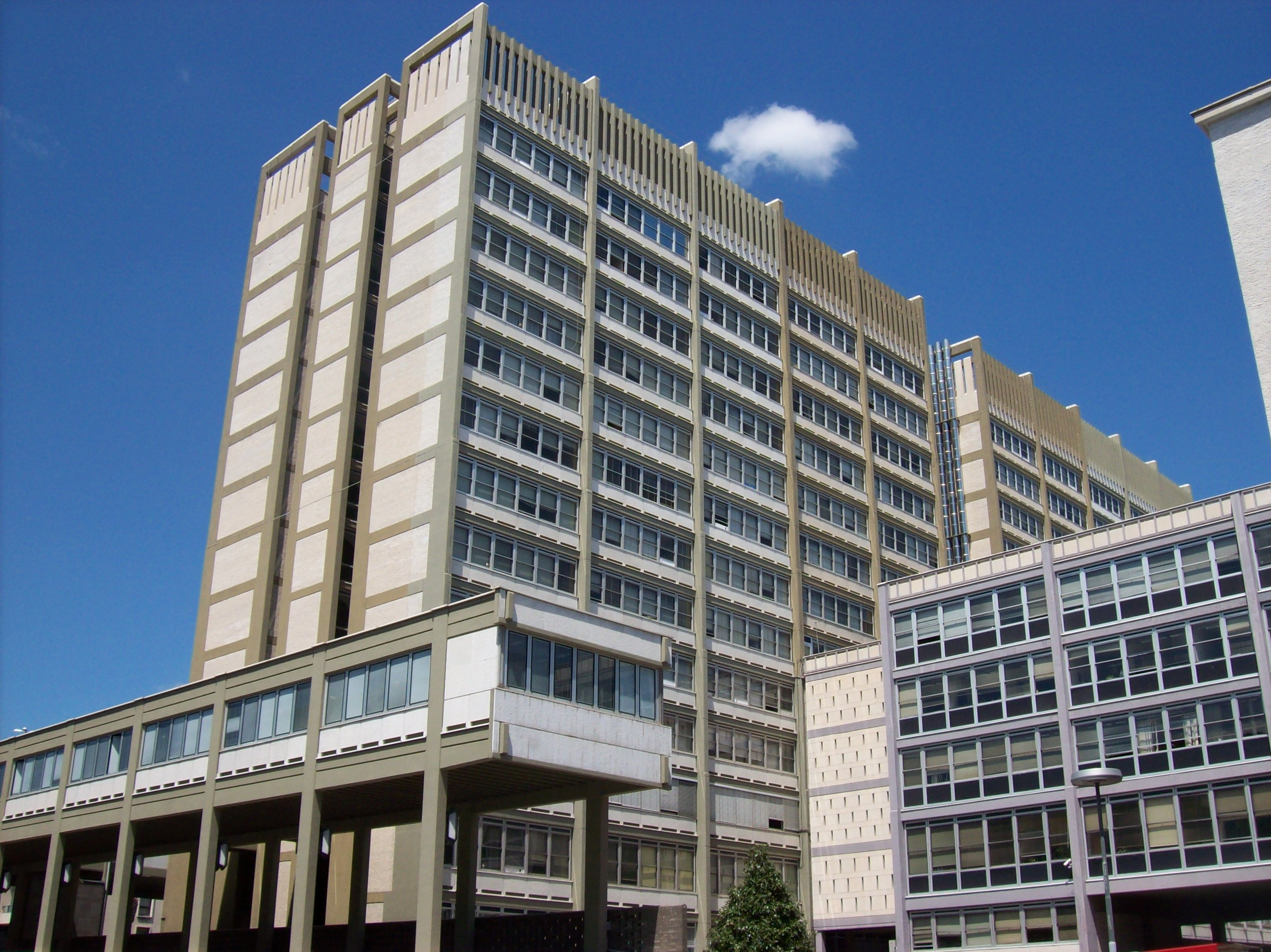
Palazzo INPS, 1967

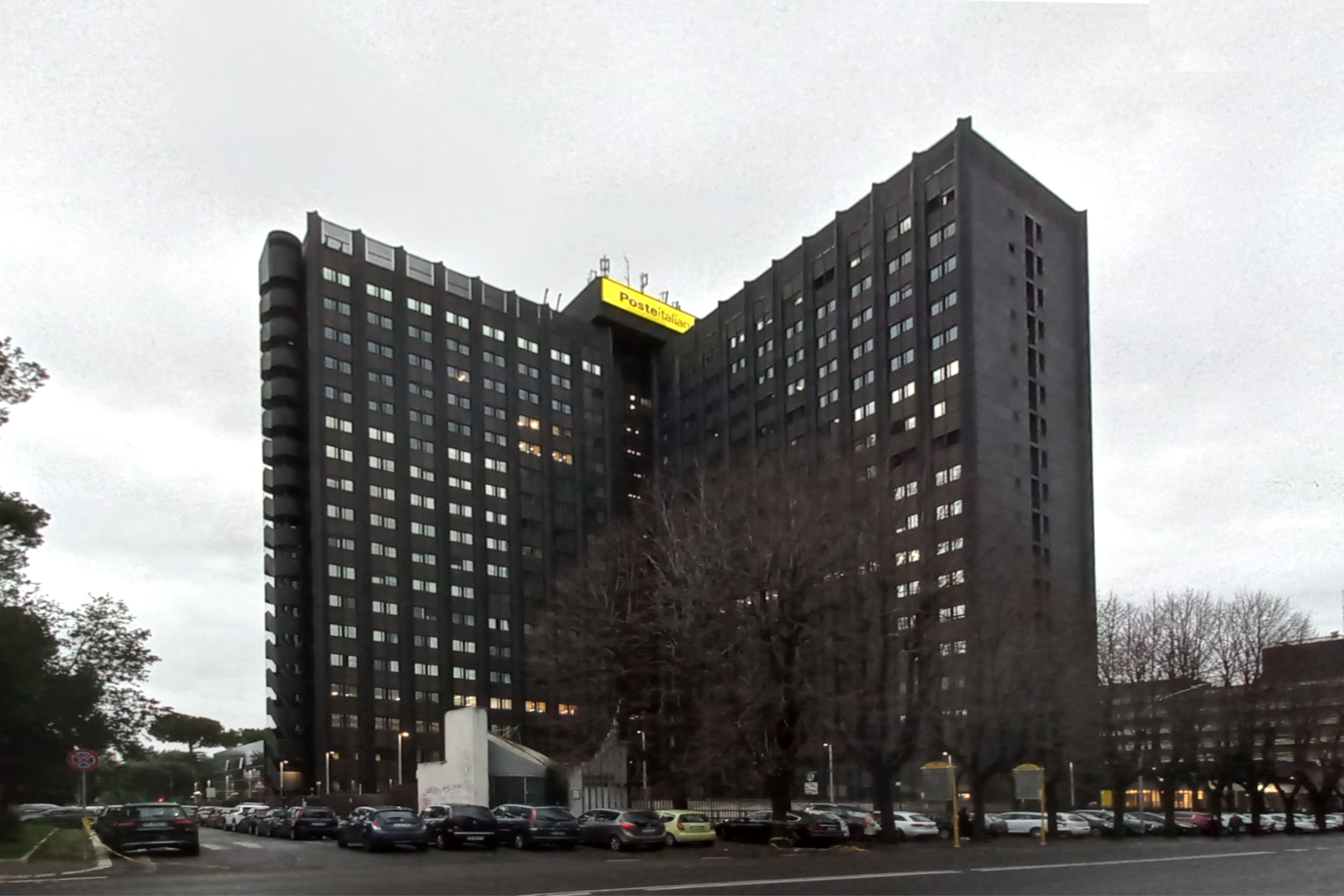
Palazzo Poste Italiane, 1969–1976

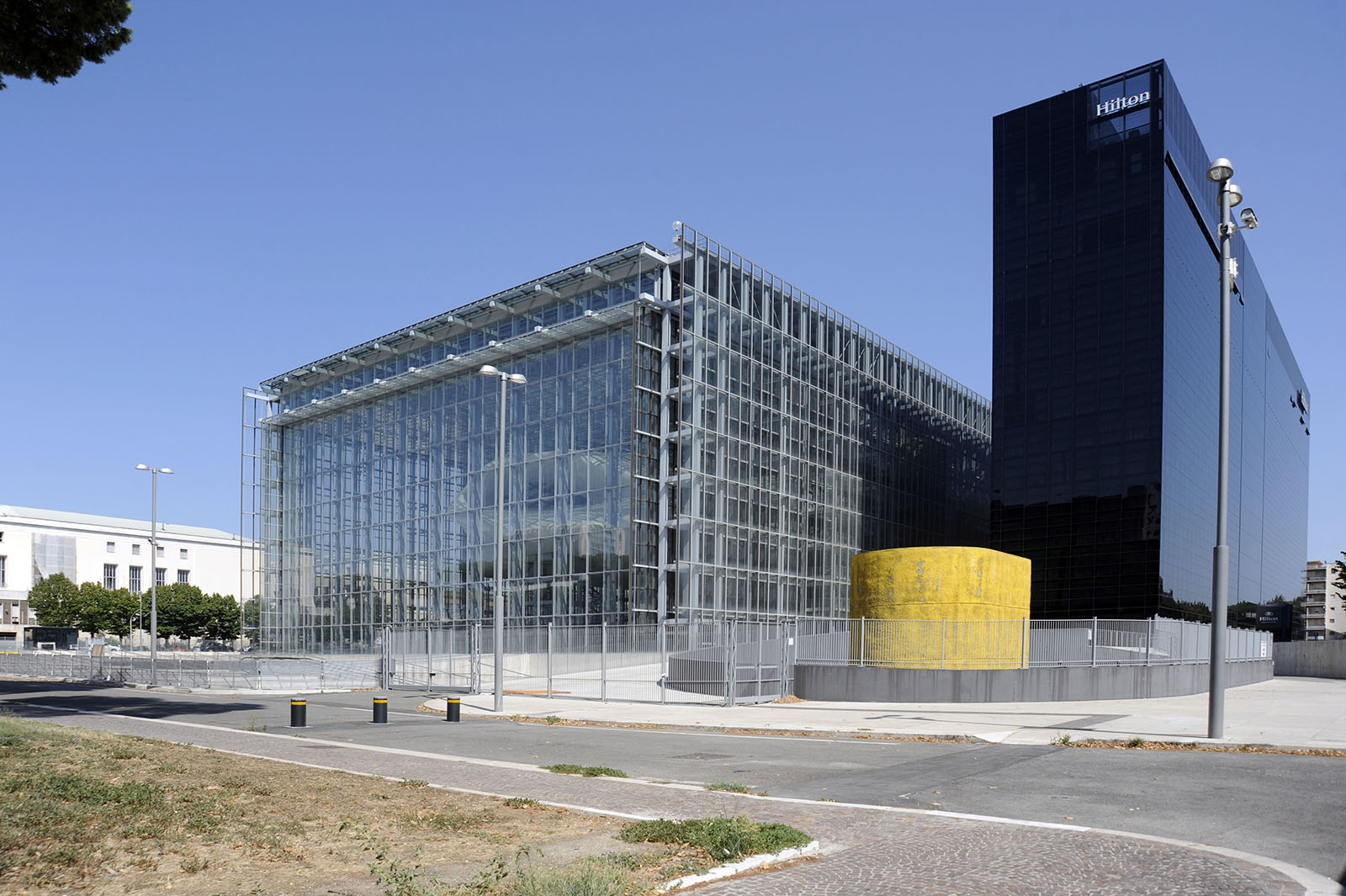
New Convention Center designed by Massimiliano Fuksas, 2016

=== Park ===
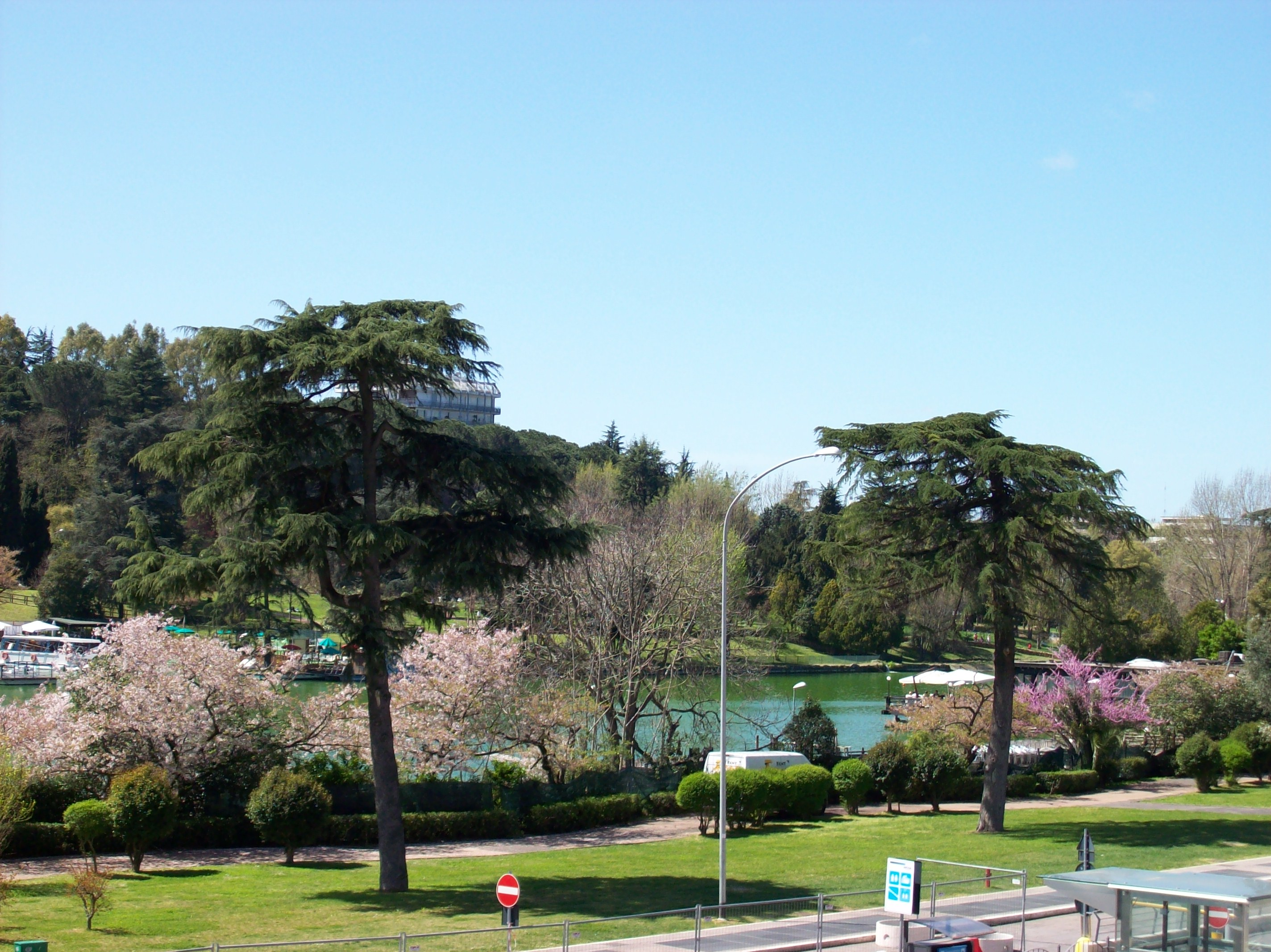
Central Lake Park

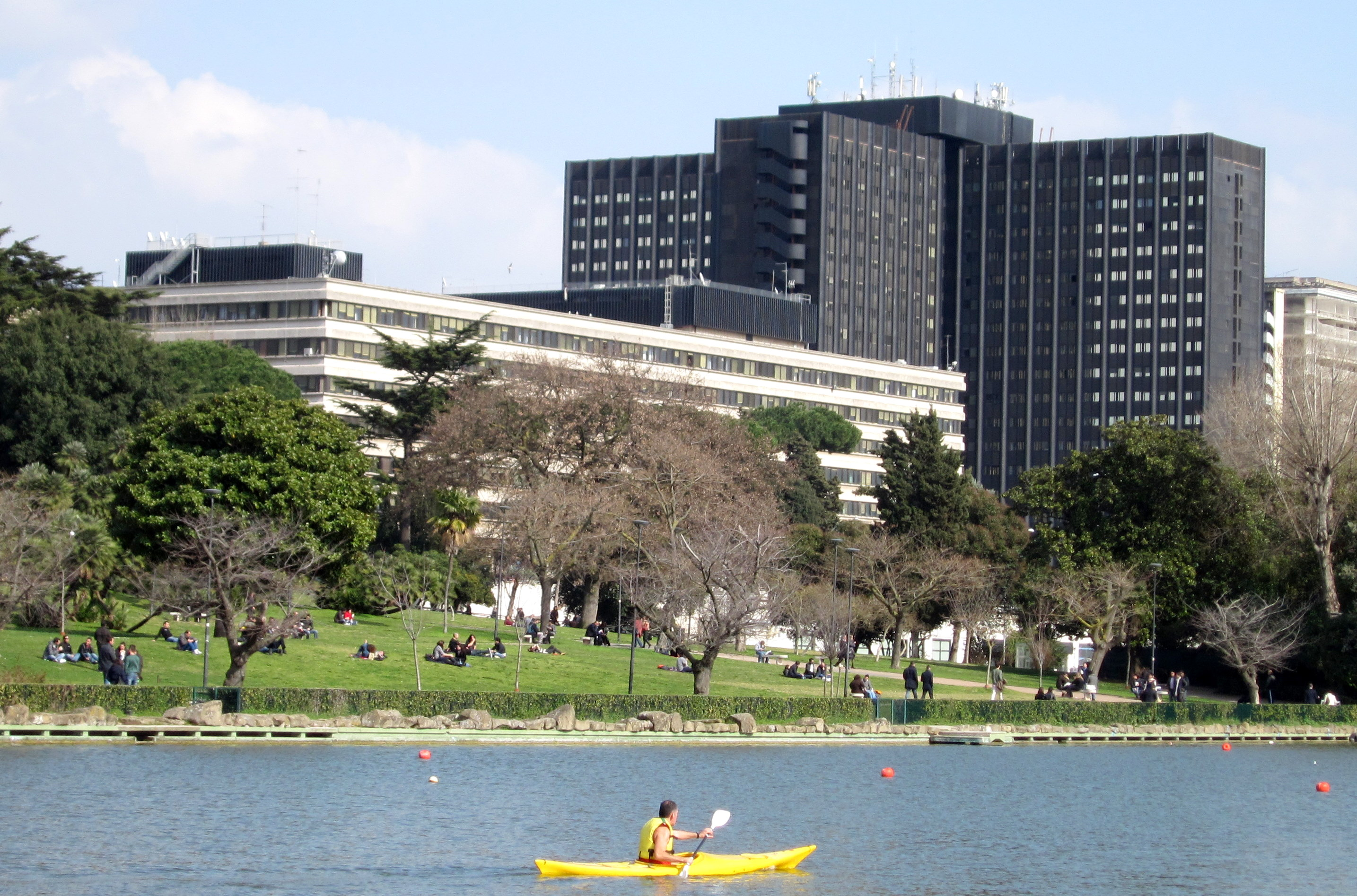
The lake

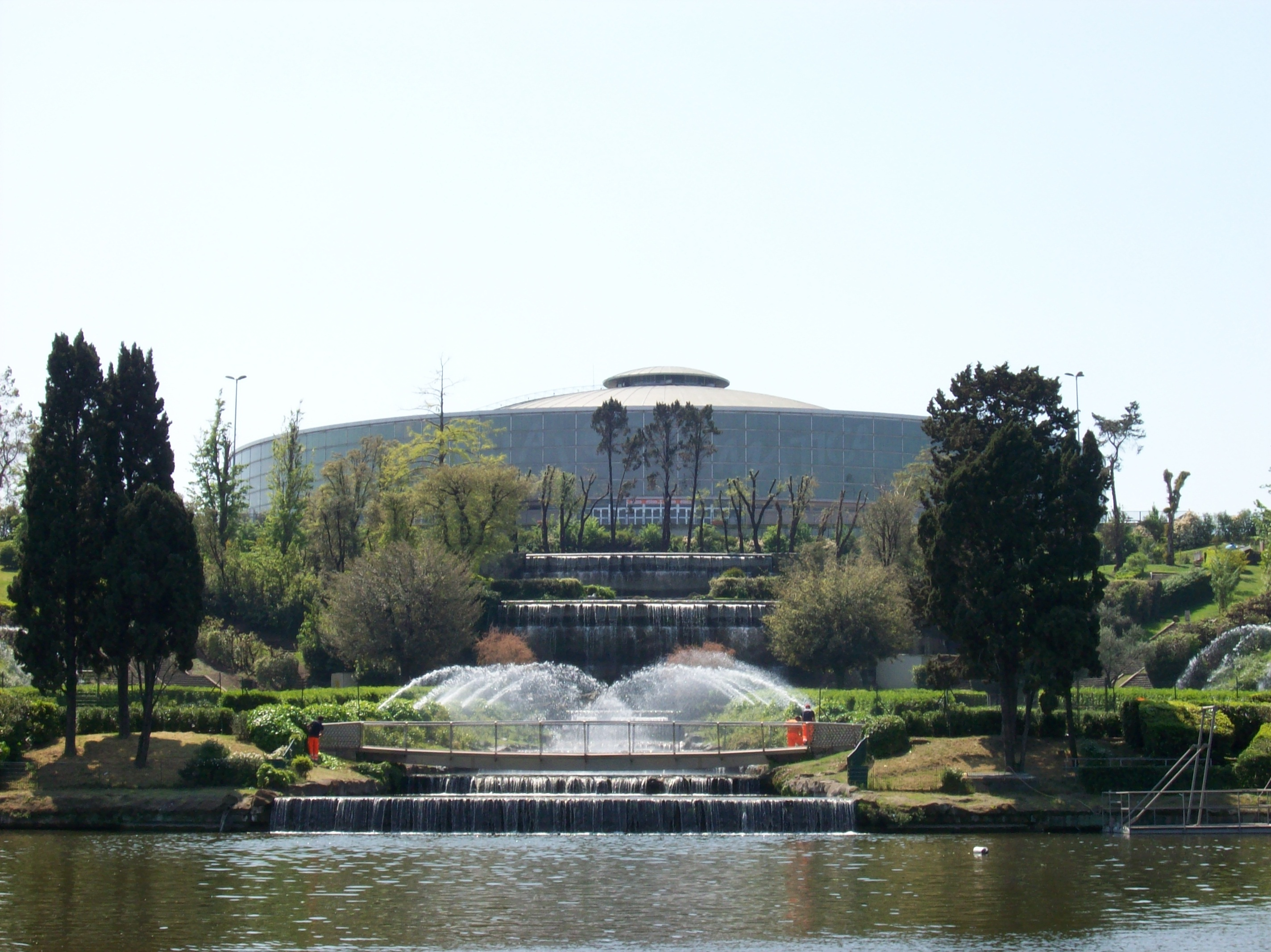
Fountains and PalaLottomatica

=== EUR during the 1960s ===
Photos taken by Italian photographer Paolo Monti, showing the district during the 1960s:

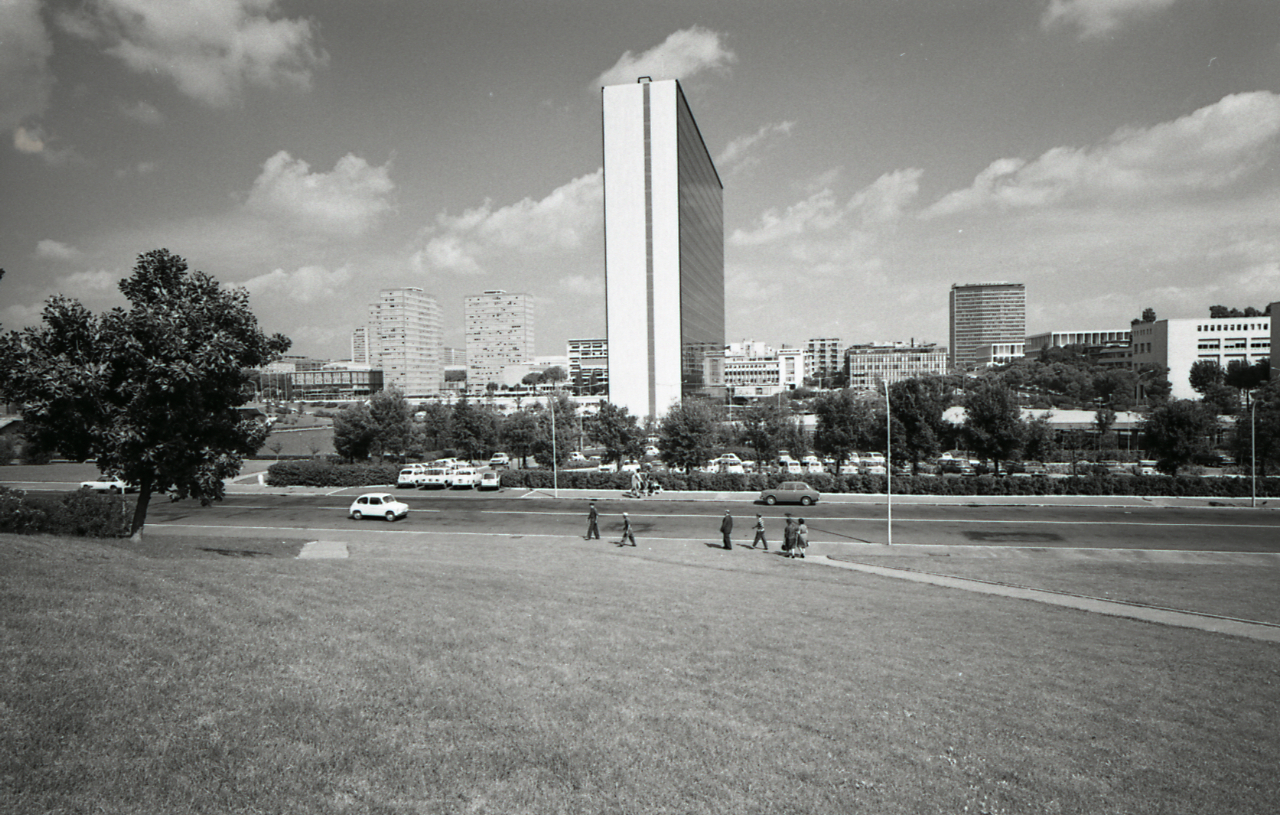

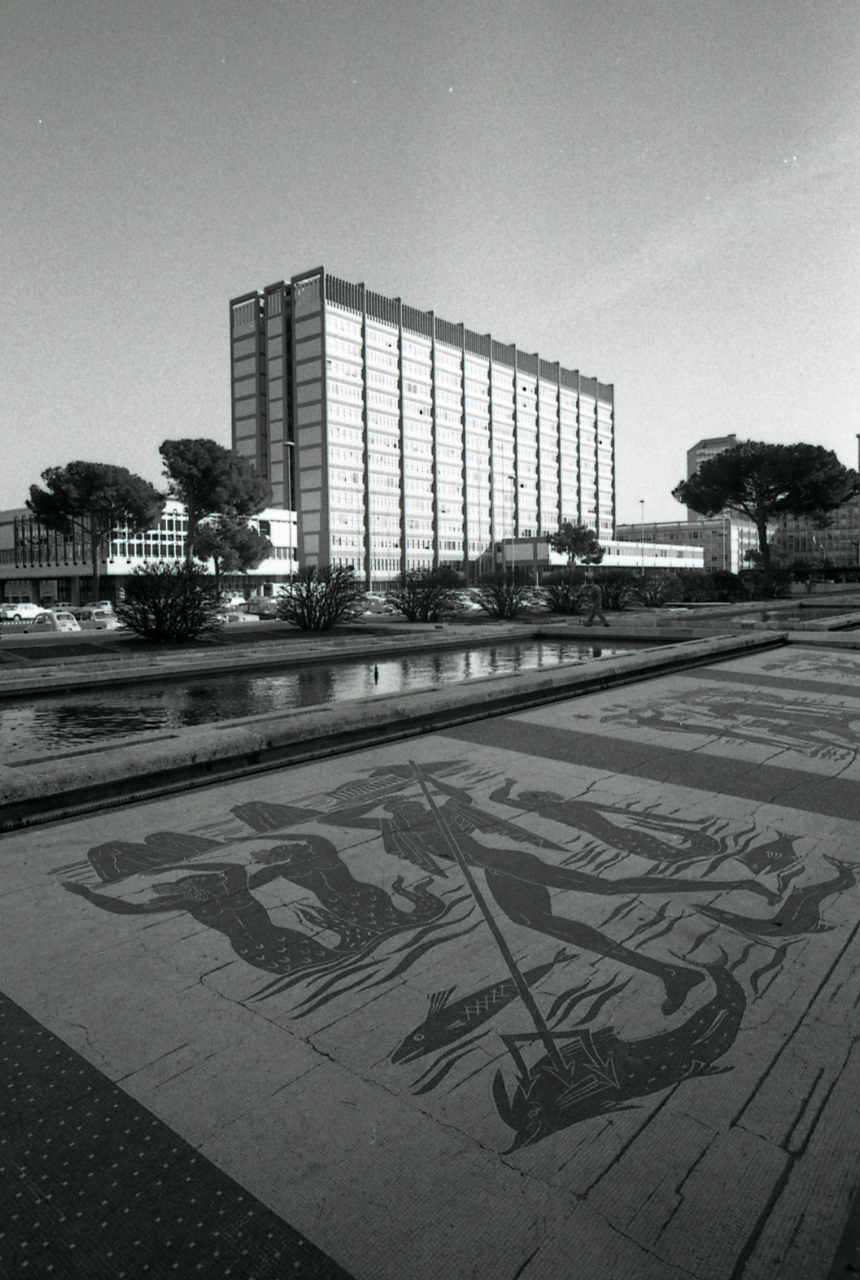

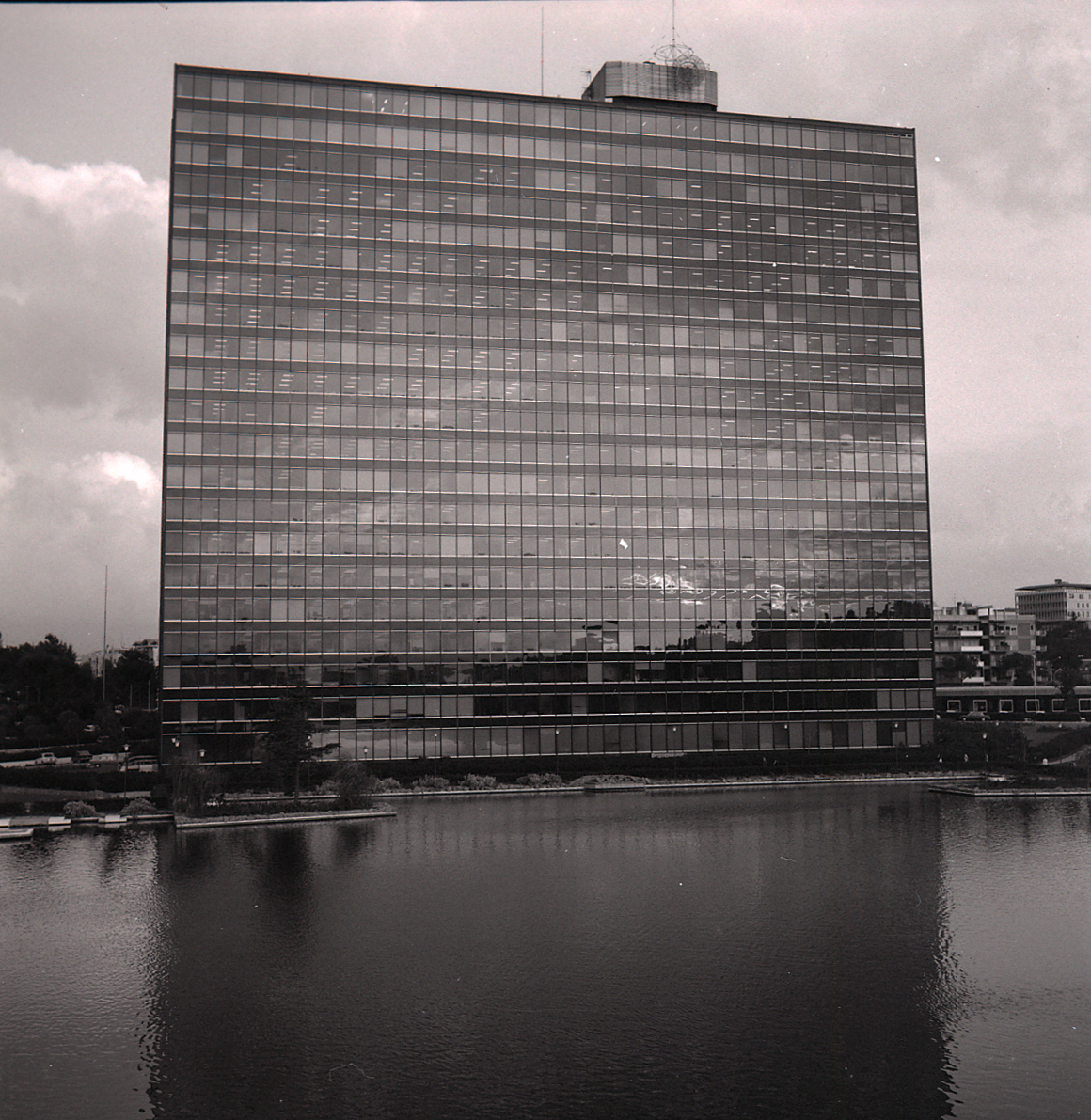

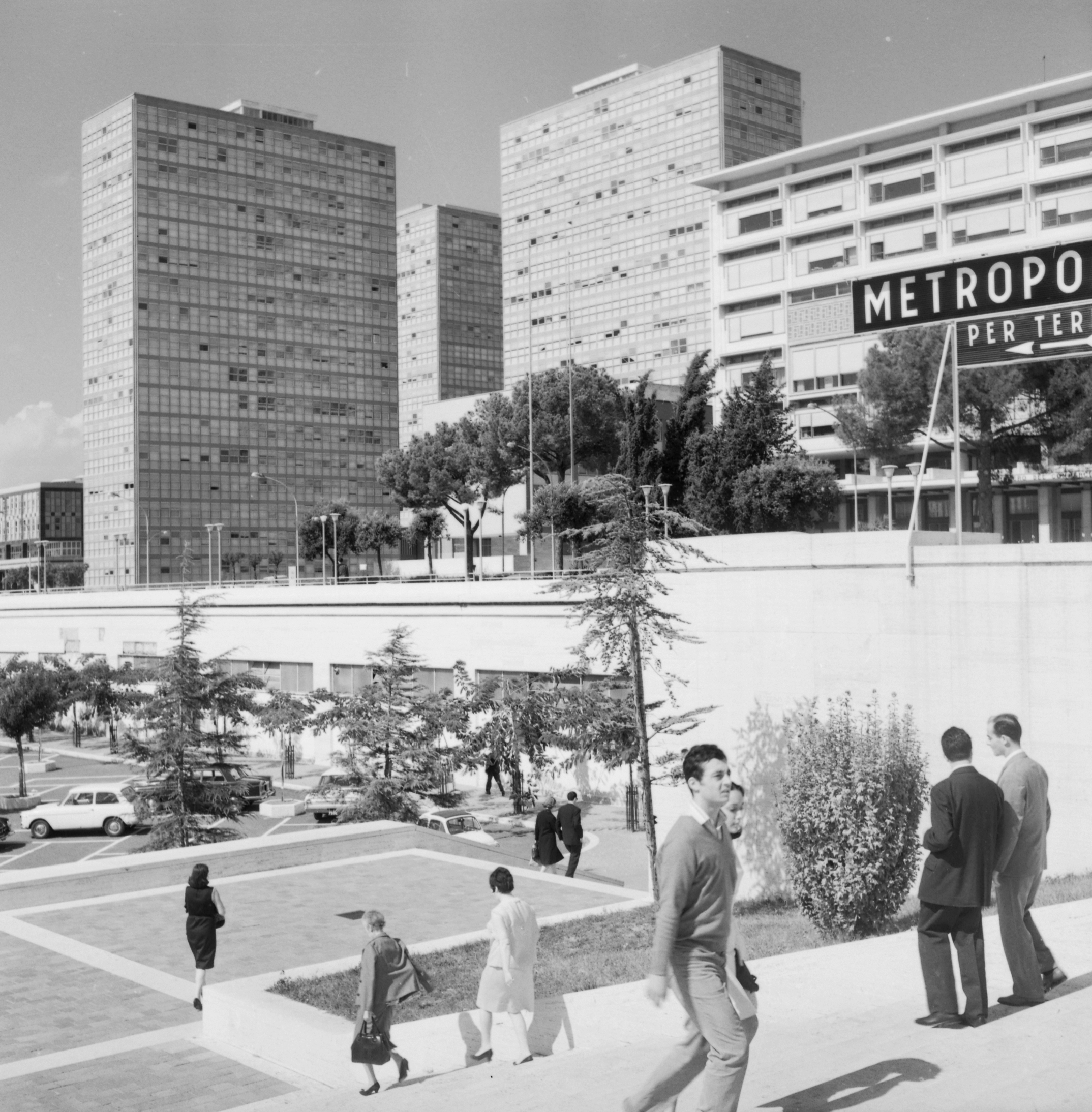

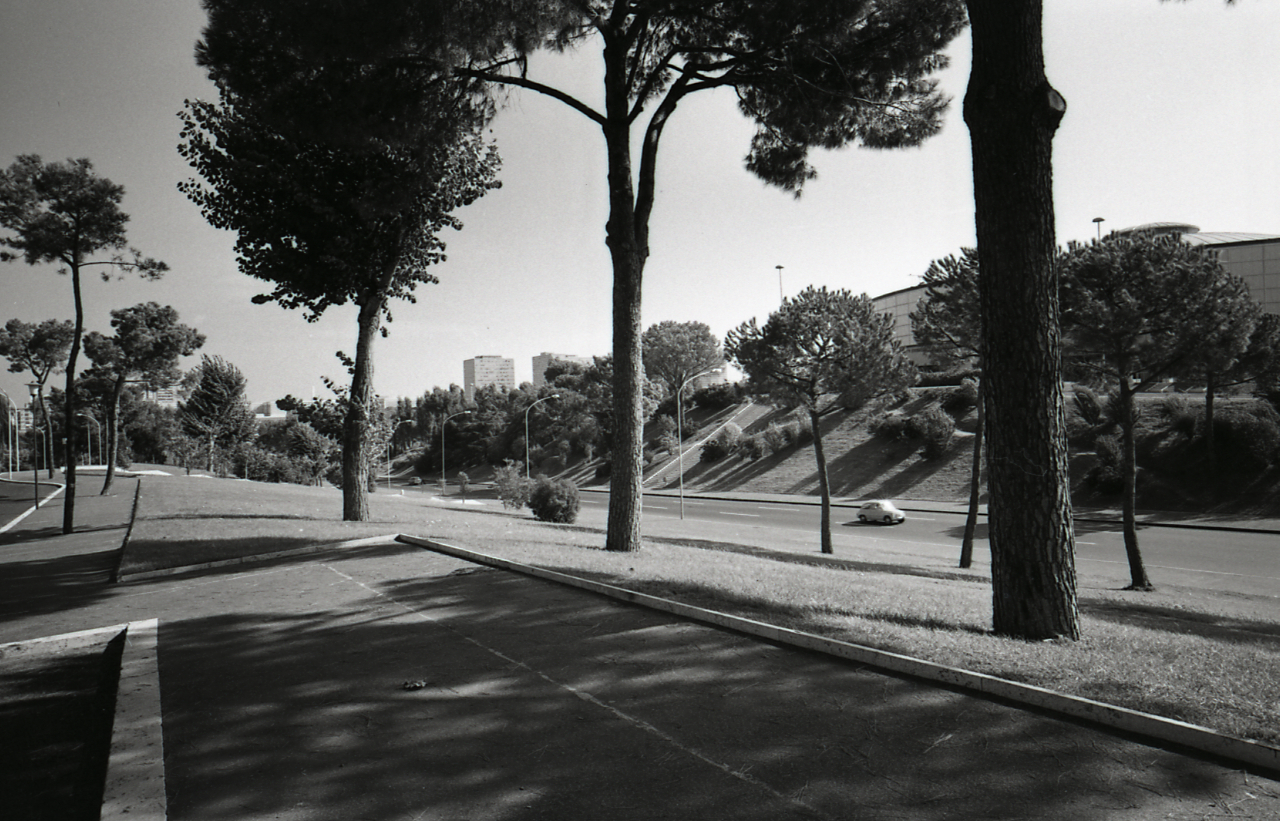

== See also ==
- Euroméditerranée, area with similar characteristics in Marseille
- 22@Barcelona, area with similar characteristics in Barcelona

== Bibliography ==
- (in German) Christine Beese: Marcello Piacentini. Moderner Städtebau in Italien. Berlin 2016, pp. 300–329.
- Insolera, Italo; Luigi di Majo (1986). L'EUR e Roma dagli anni Trenta al Duemila. Rome: Laterza. ISBN 978-88-420-2797-3.
- Augias, Corrado (2005). "XV - Il ventennale che non ci fu". I segreti di Roma - Storie, luoghi e personaggi di una capitale. Milan: Arnoldo Mondadori Editore. ISBN 978-88-04-54399-2.
