= Architecture of Rome =

Overview of the architecture in Rome

The architecture of Rome over the centuries has greatly developed from Ancient Roman architecture to Italian modern and contemporary architecture. Rome was once the world's main epicentres of Classical architecture, developing new forms such as the arch, the dome and the vault. The Romanesque style in the 11th, 12th and 13th centuries was also widely used in Roman architecture, and later the city became one of the main centres of Renaissance and Baroque architecture. Rome's cityscape is also widely Neoclassical and Fascist in style.

== Ancient Rome ==
The Colosseum

During the Roman Republic, most Roman buildings were made of concrete and bricks, but ever since about 100 BC and the Roman Empire, marble and gold were more widely used as decoration themes in the architecture of Rome, especially in temples, palaces, fora and public buildings in general. Most buildings, just like in Classical Athens, had caryatids and atlantes supporting balconies or structures, mainly representing standing women or muscular men. The caryatids found in ancient Roman architecture were mainly copies of the Greek ones, just like in the Forum of Augustus.

Roman temples were usually built on a high podium. They had a portico and a triangular pediment above columns. Romans mainly utilized the Greek classical orders, but also created a new Composite order, which was used in the Arch of Titus. Domes, vaults, aediculae (small shrines designed as small temples) and coffers were also popular elements of Classical and Imperial Roman architecture. The Colosseum is the most prominent example of ancient Roman architecture, but also the Roman Forum, the Domus Aurea, the Pantheon, Trajan's Column, Trajan's Market, the Catacombs, the Circus Maximus, the Baths of Caracalla, Castel Sant'Angelo, the Mausoleum of Augustus, the Ara Pacis, the Arch of Constantine, the Pyramid of Cestius, and the Bocca della Verità are renowned ancient monuments.

== Romanesque ==
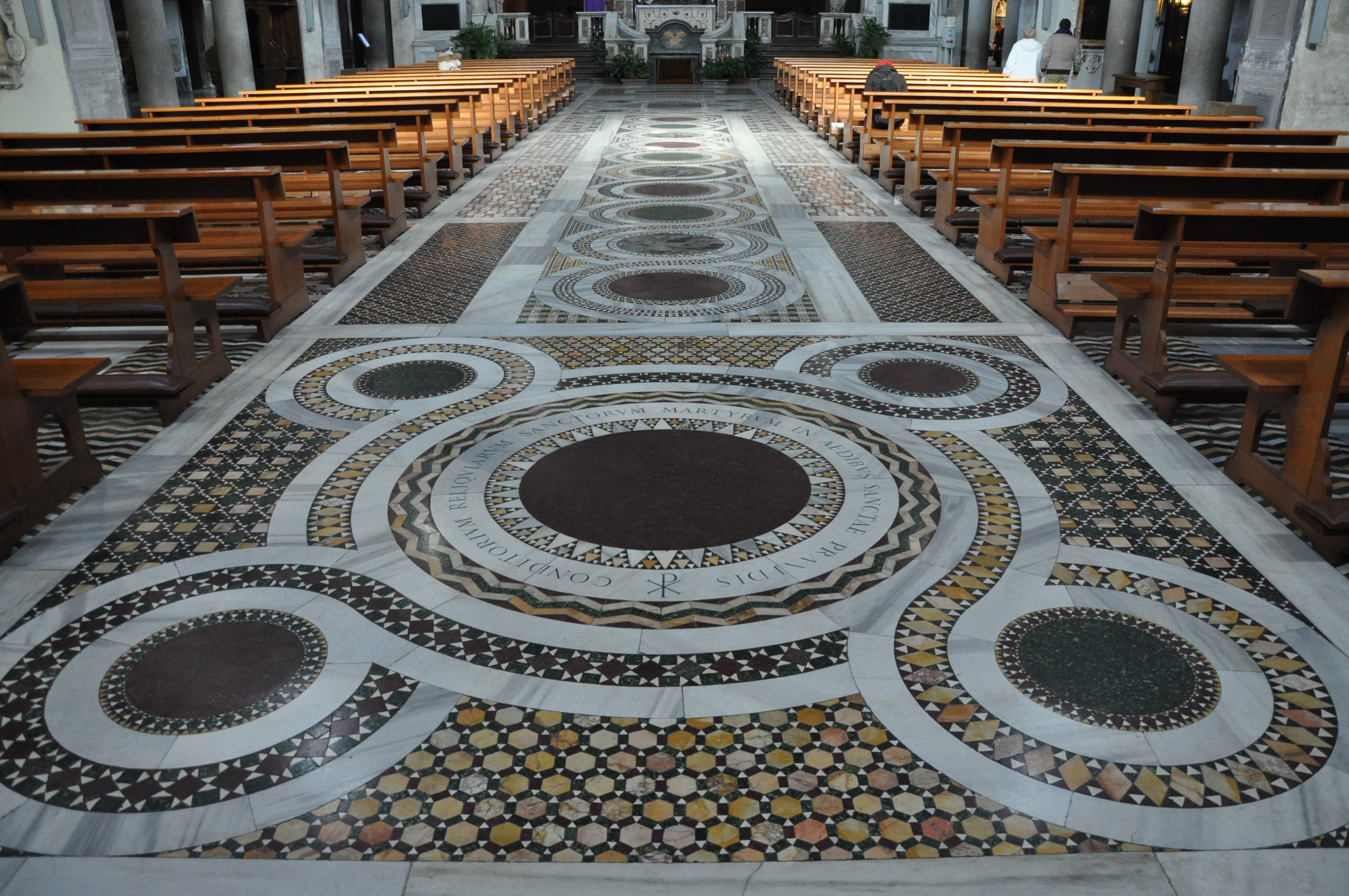
Cosmatesque pavement in the Basilica of Saint Praxedes

Rome has a rich and diverse Romanesque heritage. Many of the first Christian churches in the world were constructed in Rome, and Byzantine churches were mainly based on the Roman basilica. They were often oblong or geometric, with three naves and full of rich golden mosaics. Later Romanesque churches in Rome were more round, using the Roman arch.

Examples of buildings from this period include the Torre delle Milizie, the Torre dei Conti, and the churches of Santi Quattro Coronati, Santa Prassede, Santa Maria in Cosmedin, and Santa Maria in Aracoeli. Elaborate tabernacles were popular especially in the 13th century, and basilicas were often full of rich mosaics. In the 12th and 13th centuries, the Cosmati family was famous for their mosaics and elegant decoration. They created beautiful marble floors with mosaics, often with inlays of green and red porphyry. Their designs in Rome became so popular that they were known as Cosmatesque.

== Renaissance ==
Rome is widely regarded as being the second Renaissance capital of Italy after Florence, and was one of the most important architectural and cultural centres of the time. It derived its main designs from the Classical models. Loggias, or open-sided galleries, were fashionable, and palaces, or palazzi often had rusticated blocks decorating the grand entrances to their houses. In churches, especially in St. Peter's Basilica, baldacchini or column-supported canopies, were widely used. Examples include the Palazzo del Quirinale (now seat of the President of the Italian Republic), the Palazzo Venezia, the Palazzo Farnese, the Palazzo Barberini, the Palazzo Chigi (now seat of the Italian Prime Minister), the Palazzo Spada, the Palazzo della Cancelleria, and the Villa Farnesina.

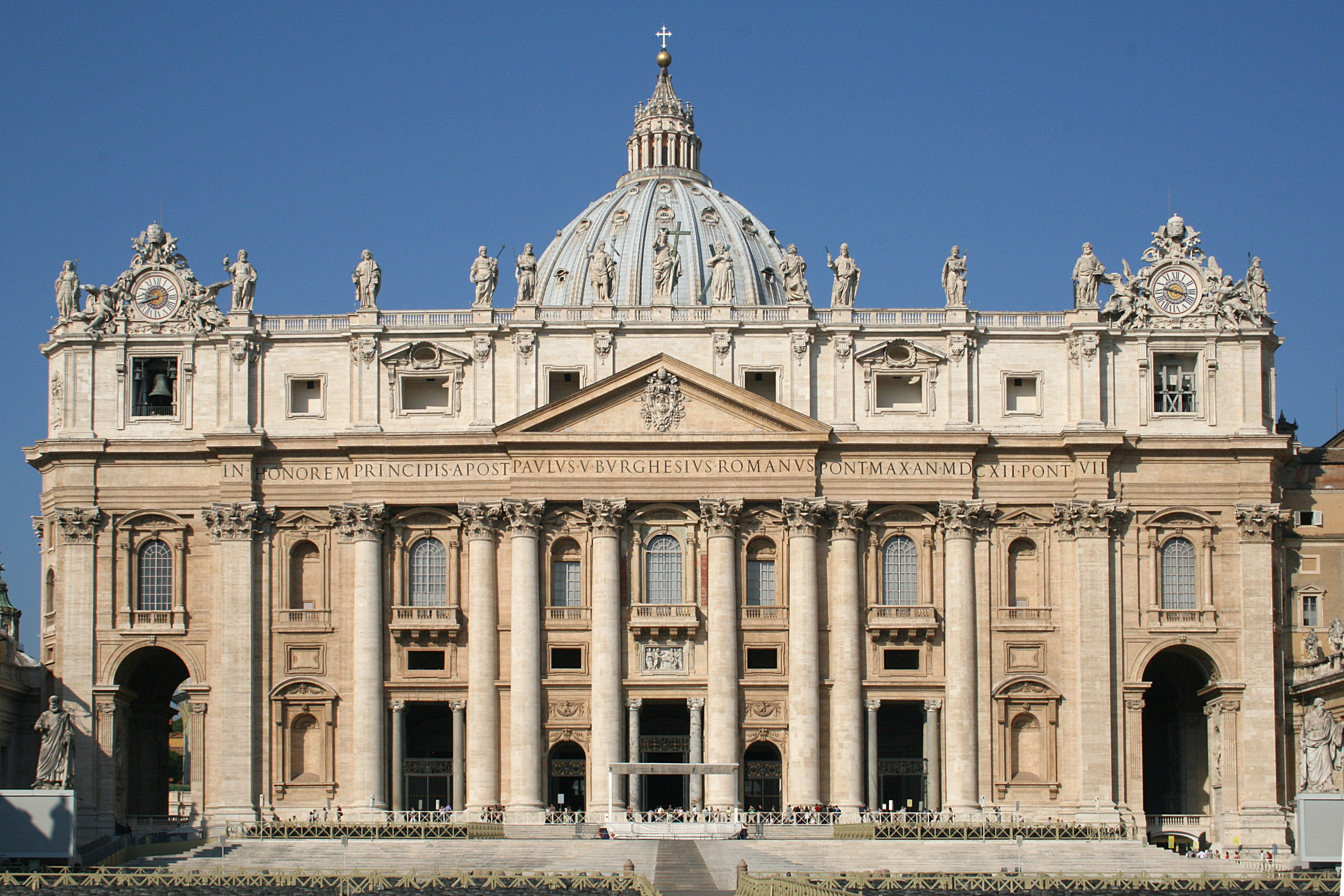
The St. Peter's Basilica

== Baroque ==
Rome is widely regarded as being the epicentre of Baroque architecture, and was profoundly influenced by the movement. Roman baroque architecture was widely based on Classical symmetry, but broke many of the architectural rules, creating a far richer and more elaborate style, preferring grandiosity and opulence rather than Renaissance classicism and elegance. Putti, or child cupids and cherubs, were popular in Baroque architectural design.

The city is famous for its many huge and majestic Baroque squares (often adorned with obelisks), many of which were built in the 17th century. The principal squares are St. Peter's Square, Piazza Navona, Piazza di Spagna, Campo de' Fiori, Piazza Venezia, Piazza Farnese and Piazza della Minerva.

One of the most emblematic Baroque structure is the Trevi Fountain by Nicola Salvi. Notable 17th-century Baroque palaces are the Palazzo Madama, now the seat of the Italian Senate and the Palazzo Montecitorio, now the seat of the Chamber of Deputies of Italy.

== Neoclassical Rome ==
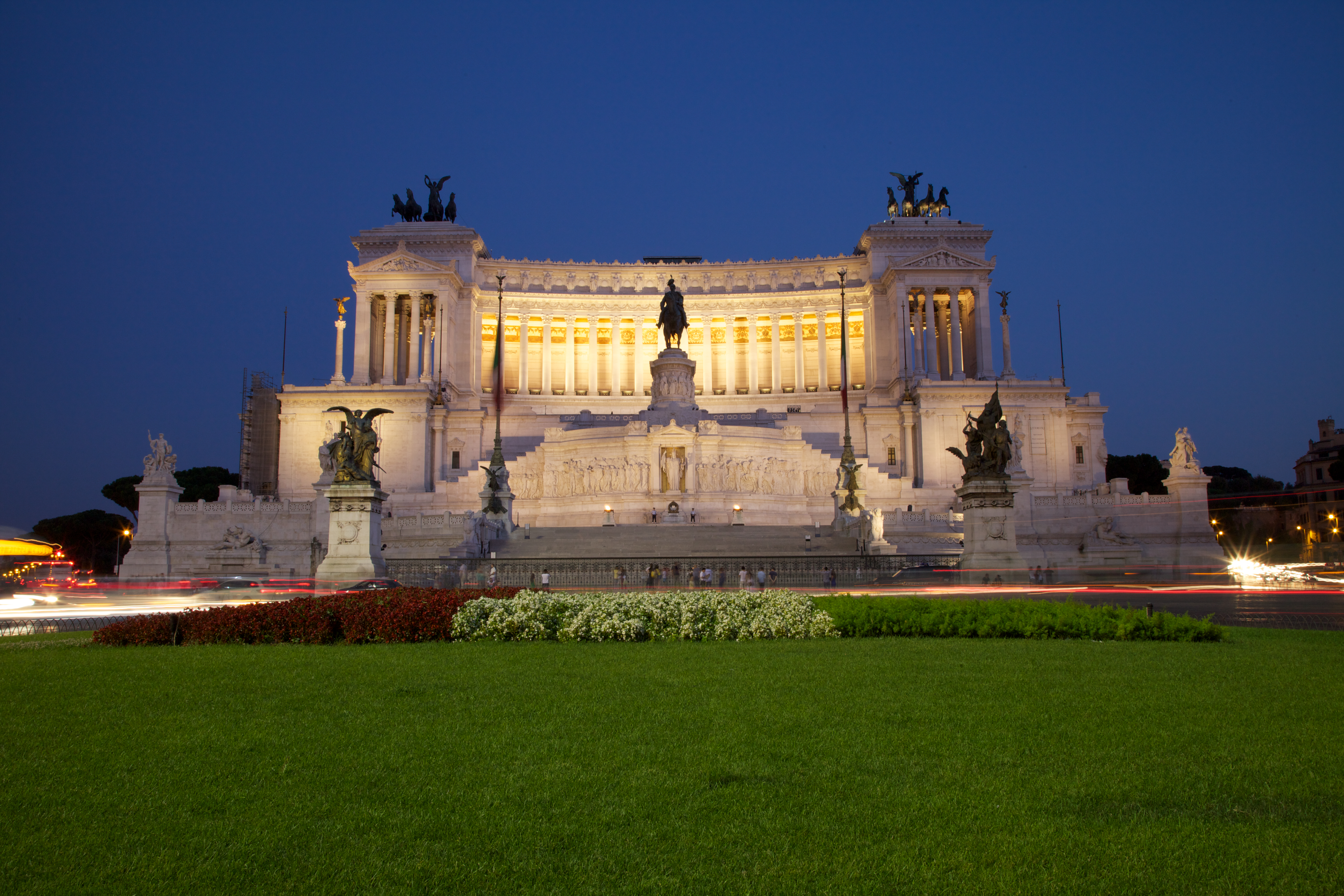
Altare della Patria, the best-known symbol of Roman neoclassical architecture

In 1870, Rome became the capital city of the new Kingdom of Italy. During this time, neoclassicism, a building style influenced by the architecture of classical antiquity, became a predominant influence in Roman architecture. During this period, many great palaces in neoclassical styles were built to host ministries, embassies, and other governing agencies.

One of the best-known symbols of Roman neoclassicism is the Victor Emmanuel II Monument, or "Altare della Patria", where the Grave of the Unknown Soldier that represents the 650,000 Italians that fell in World War I, is located.

== Fascist architecture ==
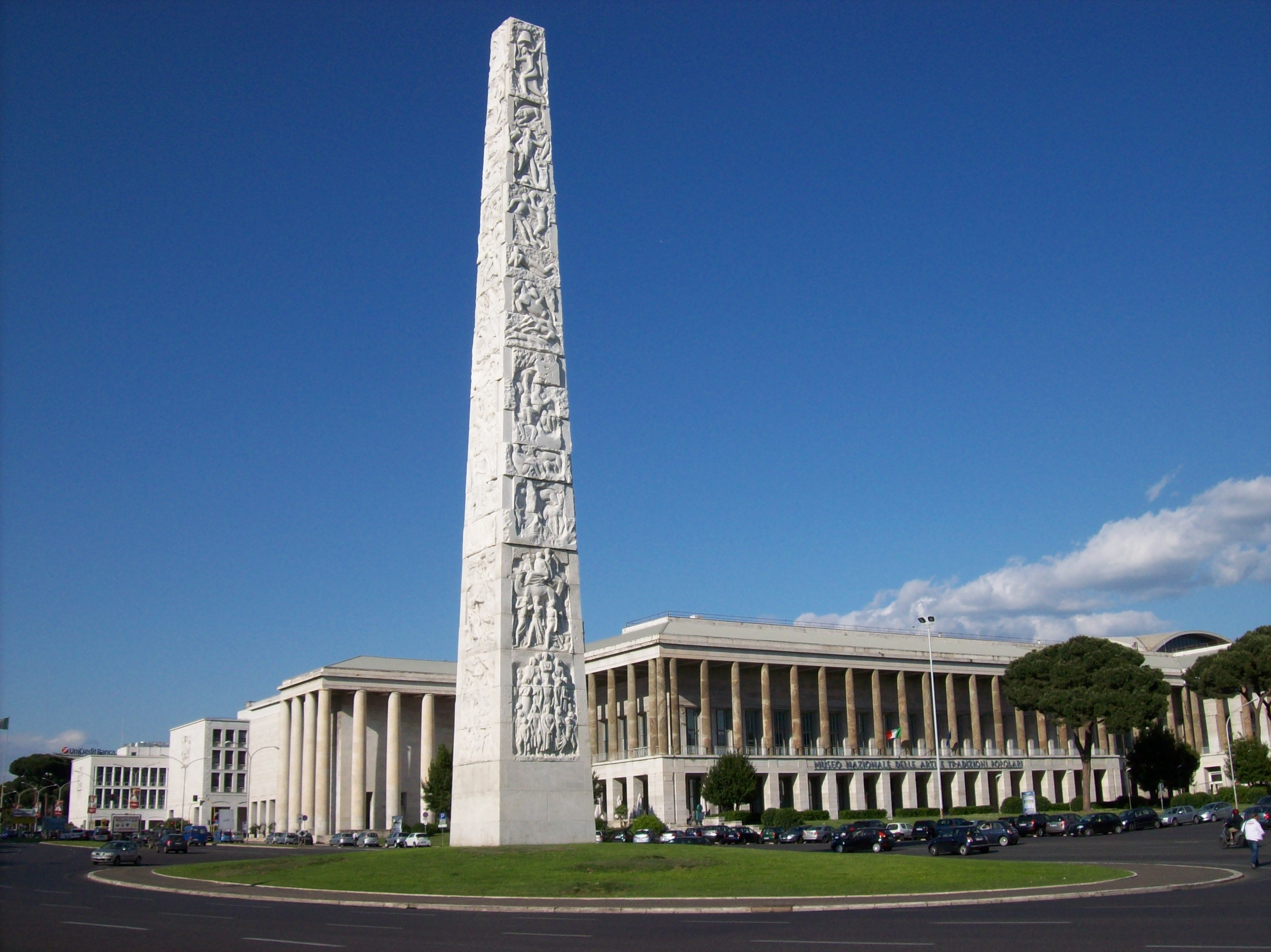
EUR, Rome, Guglielmo Marconi square

The Fascist regime that ruled in Italy between 1922 and 1943 developed an architectural style that was characterised by its links with ancient Roman architecture.

The most important Fascist site in Rome is the E.U.R district, designed in 1938 by Marcello Piacentini. It was originally conceived for the 1942 world exhibition, and was called "E.42" ("Esposizione 42"). The world exhibition, however, never took place because Italy entered the Second World War in 1940. The most representative building of the Fascist style at E.U.R. is the Palazzo della Civiltà Italiana (1938–1943), the iconic design of which has been labelled the cubic or Square Colosseum. After World War II, the Roman authorities found that they already had the seed of an off-centre business district of the type that other capitals were still planning (London Docklands and La Défense in Paris).

The Palazzo della Farnesina, the current seat of Italian Foreign Ministry, was also designed in 1935 in Fascist style.

== See also ==
- Ancient monuments in Rome
- Bridges in Rome
- Churches of Rome
- Talking statues of Rome
- Tallest buildings in Rome
