= Composition No. 94 for Three Instrumentalists (1980) =

Live album by Anthony Braxton
- Released: March 1999
- Recorded: April 20, 1980
- Venue: Palazzo dei Congressi, Bologna, Italy
- Genre: Jazz
- Length: 76:20
- Label: Golden Years of New Jazz; GY 003
- Producer: Leo Feigin

Anthony Braxton chronology
Seven Compositions 1978 (1979)	Composition No. 94 for Three Instrumentalists (1980) (1999)	For Two Pianos (1980)

Composition No. 94 for Three Instrumentalists is a live album by composer and saxophonist Anthony Braxton featuring two variations of the title piece recorded in Italy in 1980 and first released on the Golden Years of New Jazz label in 1999.

== Reception ==
Professional ratings
Review scores
Source	Rating
AllMusic	4.5/5 stars
All About Jazz	4/5 stars
The Penguin Guide to Jazz	3/4 stars

The AllMusic review by Steve Loewy stated: "the results should please even the most discerning critic of free jazz. Surprises abound, as this is one of the finest examples of extraordinary free music from the 1980s. The poor sound quality diminishes the thrill somewhat, but this CD remains an important document and a major contribution to Braxton's discography."

On All About Jazz Glenn Astarita noted "Much of the interplay is fascinating via multitonal instrumentation and imaginative improvisation. As usual, Braxton's perspectives and deeply personal if not scholarly approach defies categorization as his bandmates also give it their all! Anthony Braxton’s Composition No.94 For Three Instrumentalists (1980) is an important edition to a form of music which evolves yet beckons rediscovery".

In a separate AAJ review, Robert Spencer wrote: "This is one of Braxton's more formidable works... However, like much of his music for larger ensembles... it is full of subtle splendors and rewards repeated listenings, if only for the easy magnificence of Braxton's soloing. Recommended."

The authors of The Penguin Guide to Jazz Recordings noted that "this is apparently the only recording of the trio," and wrote: "Braxton was increasingly thinking in terms of visual parallels at this time, and much of the piece seems to be concerned with the movement of water or cloud, or with the shifting patterns of fabric."

== Track listing ==
All compositions by Anthony Braxton.

1. "First Set: Composition No. 94 (Forward Reading)" – 38:48
2. "Second Set: Composition No. 94 (Backward Reading)" – 37:15

== Personnel ==
- Anthony Braxton – sopranino saxophone, soprano saxophone, alto saxophone, tenor saxophone, contrabass clarinet
- Ray Anderson – alto trombone, tenor trombone, cornet, slide trumpet
- James Emery – acoustic guitar, electric guitar, electronics
