= Composition No. 96 =

Studio album by Anthony Braxton
- Released: 1989
- Recorded: May 30, 1981
- Venues: Cornish Institute, Seattle, WA
- Genre: Jazz
- Length: 55:35
- Labels: Leo; LR 169
- Producer: Leo Feigin

Anthony Braxton chronology
Composition 98 (1981)	Composition No. 96 (1989)	Six Compositions: Quartet (1982)

Composition No. 96 is an album by composer Anthony Braxton featuring his title piece, dedicated to Karlheinz Stockhausen, performed by a 37-piece orchestra and recorded in 1981 and originally released on the Leo label in 1989.

== Reception ==
Professional ratings
Review scores
Source	Rating
Allmusic	4/5 stars
The Penguin Guide to Jazz Recordings	3.5/4 stars

The Allmusic review by Brian Olewnick stated: "For confirmed Braxaholics, Composition 96 is a must-have, if only for its historical significance in his career. Listeners familiar with his jazz work, however, may be put off by its relatively severe classical orientation, lack of improvisation, and absence of overt themes."

== Track listing ==
1. "Composition No. 96" - 55:35

== Personnel ==
The Composers and Improvisors Orchestra conducted by Anthony Braxton

- Denise Pool, Rebecca Morgan, Nancy Hargerud - flute
- Aileen Munger, Laurri Uhlig - oboe
- Bob Davis - English horn
- Marlene Weaver - bassoon
- Bill Smith - E♭clarinet
- Paul Pearse - B♭clarinet
- Ray Downey - bass clarinet
- Denny Goodhew - alto saxophone
- Richard Reed - French horn
- Dave Scott, James Knapp - trumpet
- Julian Priester, Scott Reeves - trombone
- Rick Byrnes - tuba
- Julian Smedley, Mathew Pederson, Jeannine Davis, Libby Poole, Jeroen van Tyn, Sandra Guy, Becky Liverzey, Mary Jacobson - violin
- Betty Agent, Jean Word, Sam Williams, Beatrice Dolf - viola
- Page Smith-Weaver, Scott Threlkold - cello
- Scott Weaver, Deborah de Loria - bass
- Motter Dean - harpsichord
- Ed Hartman, Matt Kocmieroski - percussion
