= Esposizione universale (1942) =

Planned World's Fair in Rome cancelled due to WWII

1942 Rome
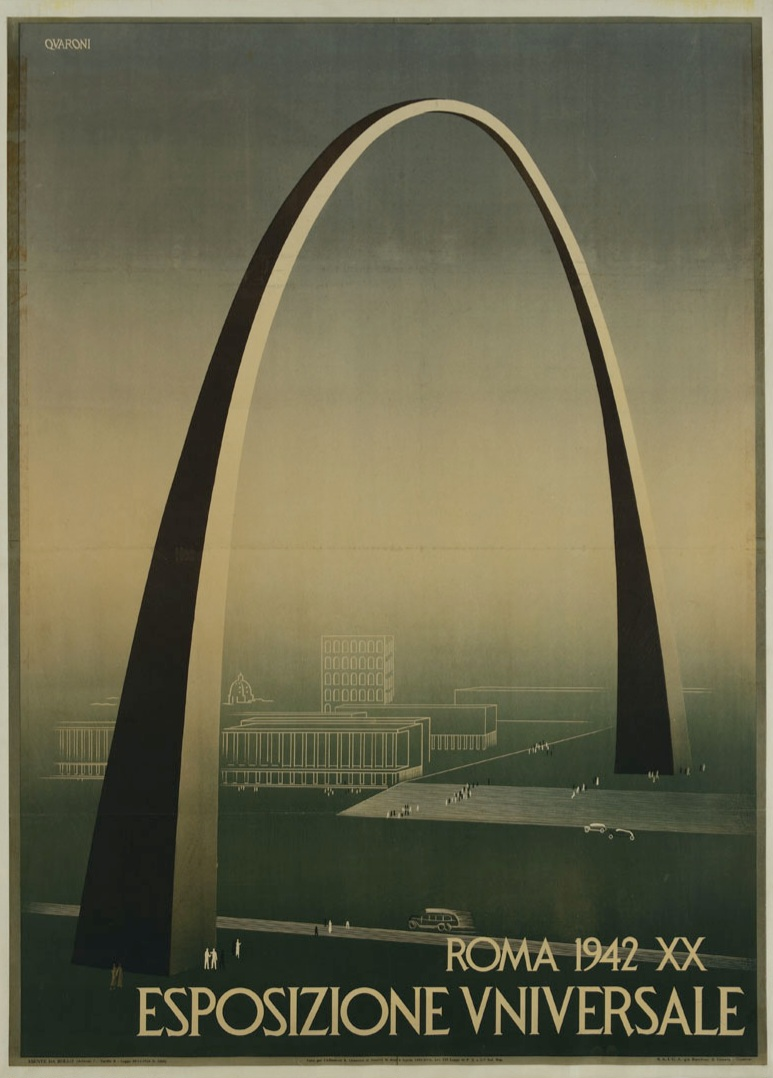
- Poster by Giorgio Quaroni for the aborted 1942 World’s Fair in Rome, showing the planned arch

Overview
- BIE-class: Unrecognized exposition
- Name: Esposizione Universale Roma
- Building(s): EUR, Rome

Location
- Country: Fascist Italy
- City: Rome
- Venue: EUR, Rome
- Coordinates: 41°50′01″N 12°28′15″E

expositions
- Previous: Cabrillo Fair in Los Angeles
- Next: Norwegian Exhibition in Stockholm

The Esposizione universale was a planned World's Fair that was intended to be held in Rome in 1942. The fair was intended to celebrate twenty years of Italian fascism under Benito Mussolini. Although extensive preparations were made under Italy's Fascist government, the exhibition was cancelled on 3 June 1940, following the entry of Italy into World War II in 1940. A substantial area of Rome named the Esposizione Universale Roma, also known as E42 or EUR, was developed in preparation for the fair. Although never inaugurated, the E42 project remains a significant example of Fascist architecture and urban planning.

== Description ==
The exposition, originally planned for 1941, was postponed to 1942 to celebrate the twentieth anniversary of Mussolini's seizure of power. It represented the culmination of fascist ideology and ambitions. According to its planners, the Fair would “be of vast proportions…of the highest Technical Italian Art…the grandest conception in the field of Technique and Mechanical Art.”

The area around the Tre Fontane Abbey was chosen for the Expo over the Lido di Ostia and the Magliana area. This new neighbourhood, stretching over kilometres of marshland and uncultivated countryside, was intended to represent the Third Rome and its universal vocation, as well as the city's expansion towards global domination. In 1938, four hundred hectares of land were requisitioned to begin construction of the new district, temporarily named E42. Various competitions were launched, attracting leading architects such as Marcello Piacentini, Giuseppe Pagano, Gio Ponti, Adalberto Libera and Luigi Moretti. Cipriano Efisio Oppo, a painter, art critic and senator, directed the selection of artists. All the artists had to declare their adherence to the guiding principles of Fascism.

The design of the new district was inspired, according to the fascist ideology, by Roman Imperial town planning, Numerous buildings were commissioned as part of the project, including the Palazzo della Civiltà Italiana, the Palazzo dei Ricevimenti and the Palazzo dei Congressi. A massive 240-metre-tall "Arch of the Empire" was intended to mark the entrance to the fair. A "Universal Science" exhibition, to be held at the Palazzo della Scienza Universale, was to be one of the main attractions of the fair.

When work was finally halted at the end of 1943, only the Palazzo degli Uffici had been completed. This building was intended to house the staff of the EUR Institute and its interiors were designed by Guglielmo Ulrich, one of the greatest designers of the time. The Palazzo della Civiltà Italiana had been inaugurated but was not yet fully complete. Most of the decorative works were never realised. Exceptions included mosaics by Enrico Prampolini (The Corporations), and Fortunato Depero (Arts, Crafts, and Professions).

== Legacy ==
Work resumed soon after the end of the Second World War. During the EA 53 and, above all, the 1960 Summer Olympics, the EUR area became one of the main centres alongside the Foro Italico. In the 1950s, the Palazzo della Civiltà Italiana and the Palazzo dei Congressi were completed; the former Via Imperiale was fully opened up and renamed Via Cristoforo Colombo; the metro line from Termini Station began operating; and the Church of Santi Pietro e Paolo a Via Ostiense opened and the Palazzo dello Sport, designed by Pier Luigi Nervi and Marcello Piacentini, was built.

In short, without rejecting the original project, EUR was transformed into a residential neighbourhood — a concept that had already been part of the Fascist programme. Living in EUR became a status symbol and part of the upper middle class left northern Rome to move south, marking a small revolution in the capital's social geography. EUR was used as one of the backdrops in Federico Fellini’s La Dolce Vita (1960). Elio Petri filmed some scenes of The 10th Victim there and Michelangelo Antonioni used it as the setting for L'Eclisse.

== Gallery ==
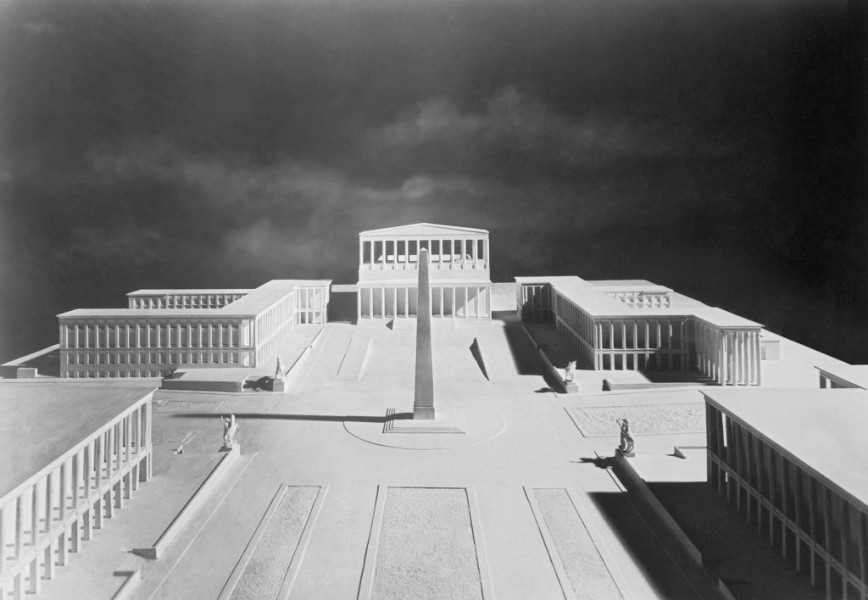
Plan for the Piazza Imperiale, designed by Francesco Fariello, Luigi Moretti, Saverio Muratori and Ludovico Quaroni. The plan was presented at the Milan Triennial VII in 1940.

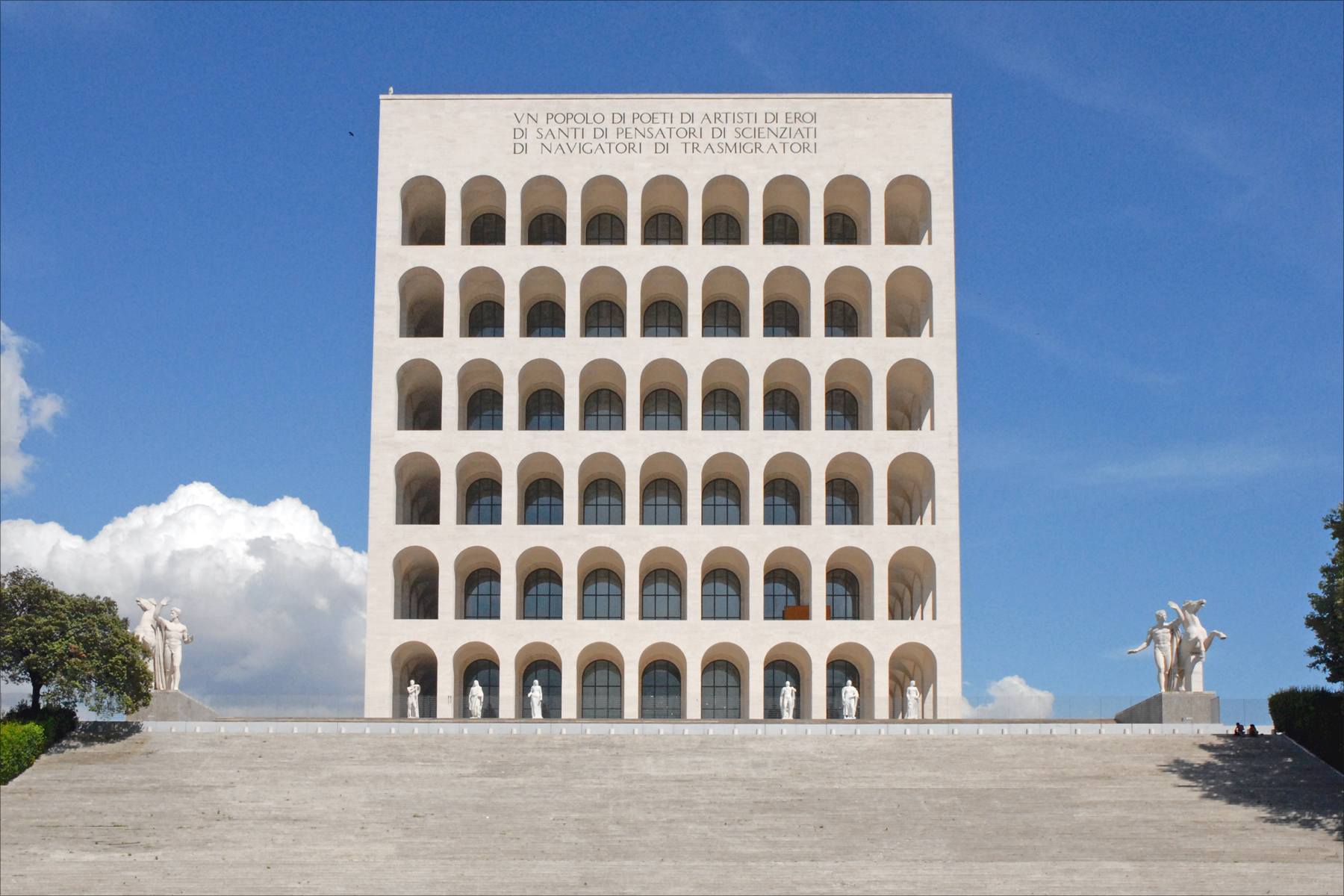
The Palazzo della Civiltà Italiana, designed by Giovanni Guerrini, Ernesto Lapadula, and Mario Romano

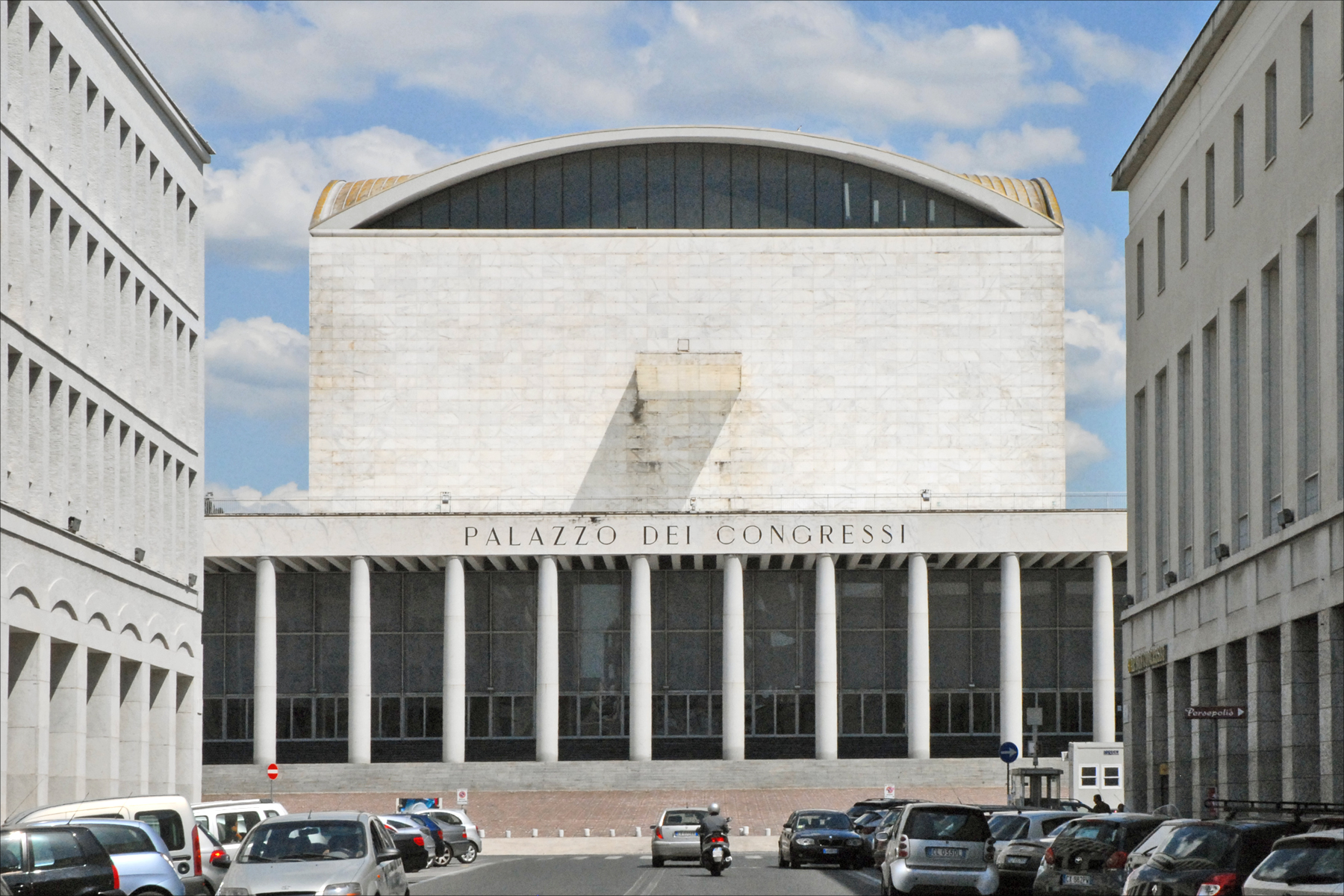
The Palazzo dei Congressi, designed by Adalberto Libera.

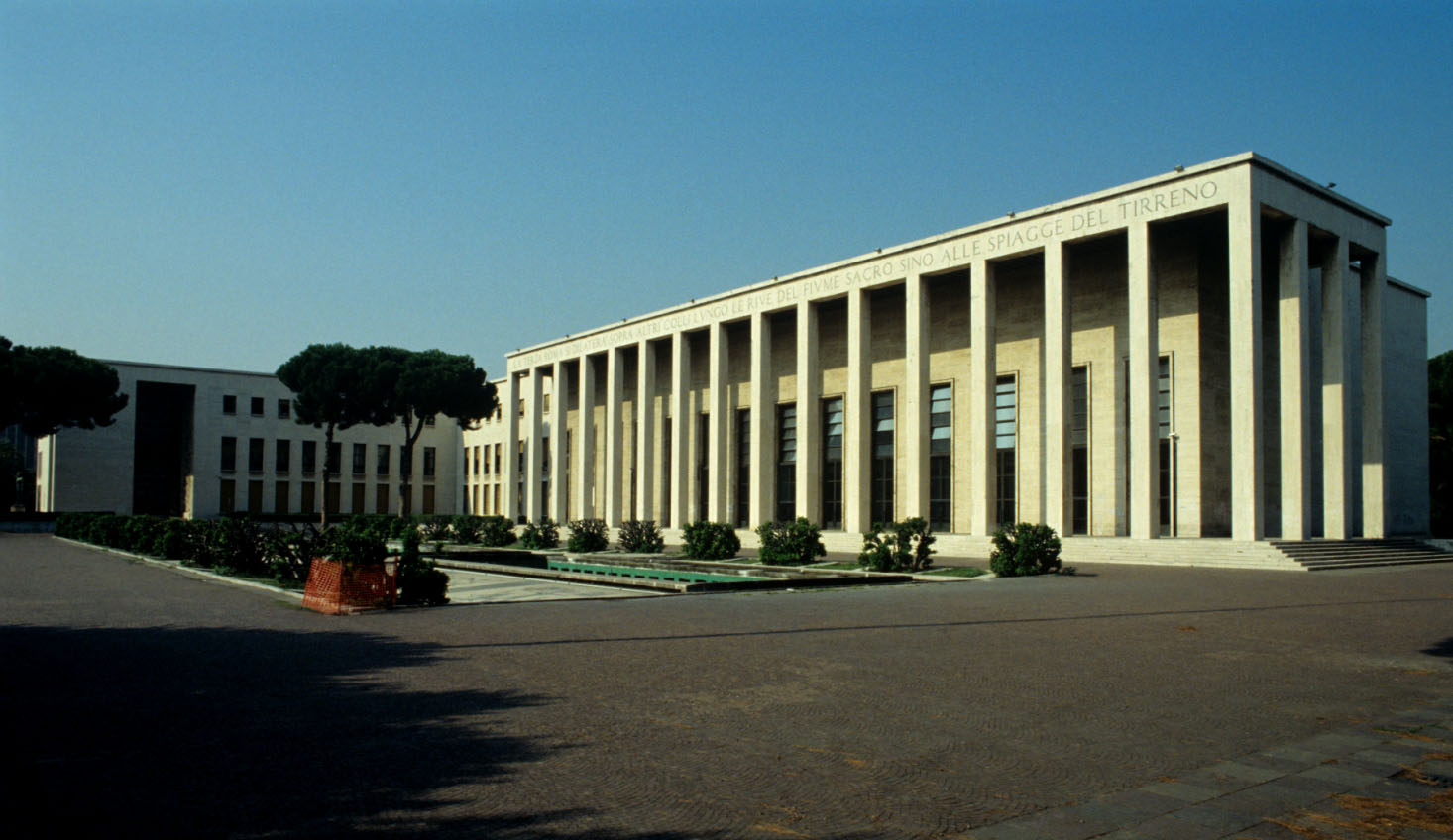
The Palazzo degli Uffici. Designed by the architect Gaetano Minucci, the building was intended to house the headquarters of the Exposition.

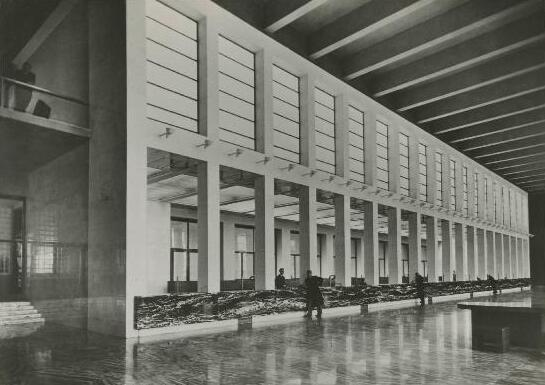
The interior of the Palazzo degli Uffici shortly after its completion in the late 1930s.

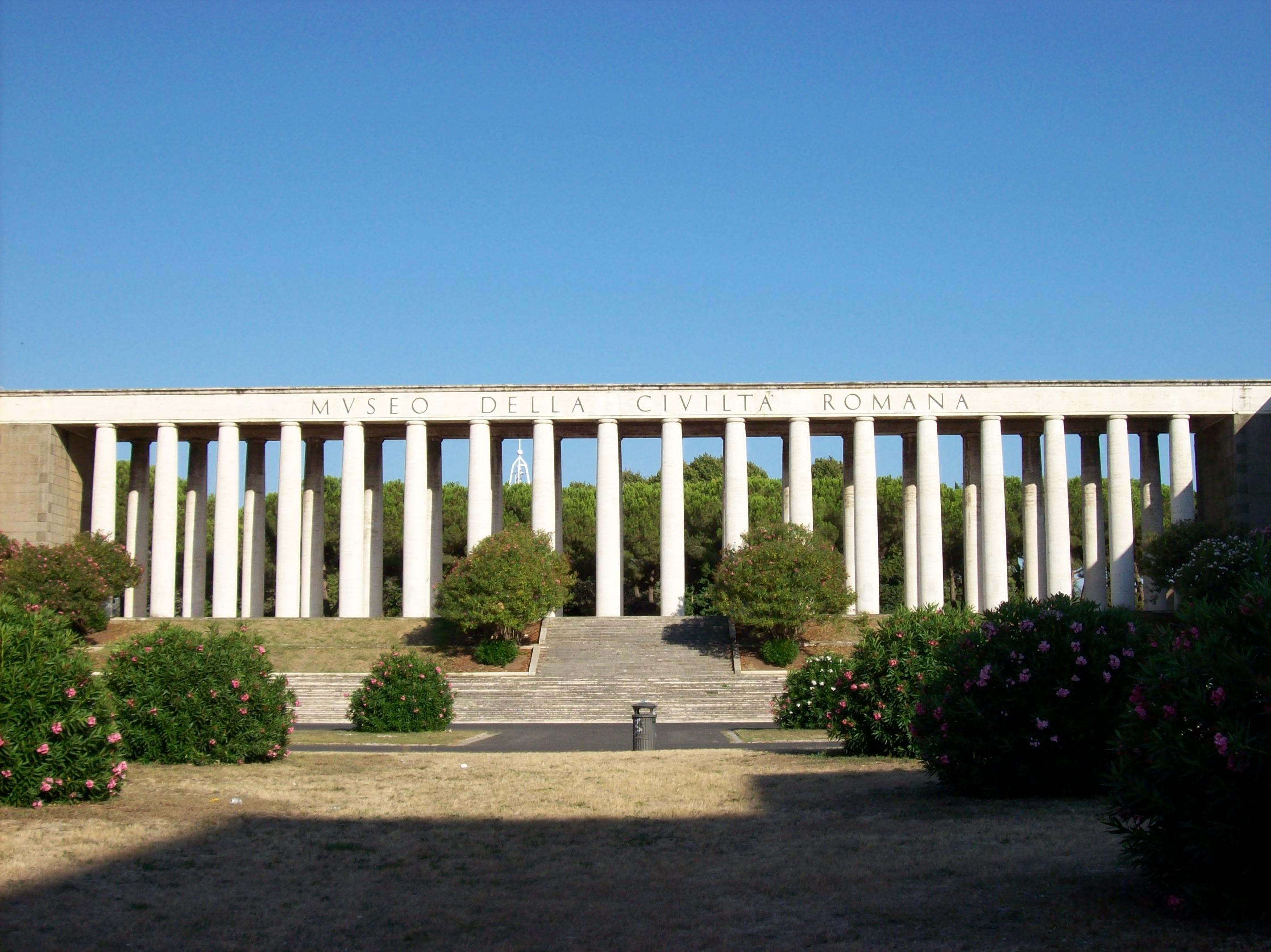
The background colonnade of the Museum of Roman Civilization

== See also ==
- Fascist architecture
- Mostra autarchica del Minerale italiano
- Exhibition of the Fascist Revolution
- Germania (city)

== Bibliography ==
- E42. Utopia e scenario del Regime. 2 vols. Venice: Marsilio. 1987.
- Mariani, Riccardo (1987). E42 un progetto per l'Ordine Nuovo. Milan: Edizioni Comunità.
- Colombari, Lucia (2025). "The Italian Fascist Vision for the " World of Tomorrow " at the New York 1939 World's Fair". In Emily C. Burns; Alice M. Rudy Price (eds.). The Routledge Companion to Art and the Formation of Empire. London: Taylor & Francis. pp. 286–304. ISBN 978-1040343142.
