= Composition 98 =

Studio album / Live album by Anthony Braxton
- Released: 1981
- Recorded: January 19 & 24, 1981; Ludwigsburg, West Germany and Bern, Switzerland
- Genre: Jazz
- Length: 96:35
- Label: hat ART; ART 1984
- Producer: Pia & Werner X. Uehlinger

Anthony Braxton chronology
For Two Pianos (1980)	Composition 98 (1981)	Composition No. 96 (1981)

Composition 98 is an album by composer Anthony Braxton featuring the title piece, recorded in 1981 performed by a quartet, and originally released on the hat ART label as a double LP containing live and studio versions of the composition, but only the studio version was rereleased on CD in 1990.

Professional ratings
Review scores
Source	Rating
Allmusic	3/5 stars
The Rolling Stone Jazz Record Guide	5/5 stars

== Track listing ==
1. "Composition 98 (Studio)" – 48:30
2. "Composition 98 (Live)" – 48:05

== Personnel ==
- Anthony Braxton – alto saxophone, tenor saxophone, soprano saxophone, sopranino saxophone, C melody saxophone
- Hugh Ragin – trumpet, piccolo trumpet, flugelhorn
- Ray Anderson – trombone, alto trombone, slide trumpet
- Marilyn Crispell – piano
