= Six Compositions: Quartet =

Studio album by Anthony Braxton
- Released: 1982
- Recorded: October 21–22, 1981
- Studios: Generation Sound Studios, NYC
- Genre: Jazz
- Length: 33:41
- Labels: Antilles; AN 1005
- Producer: Anthony Braxton

Anthony Braxton chronology
Composition No. 96 (1981)	Six Compositions: Quartet (1982)	Open Aspects '82 (1982)

Six Compositions: Quartet is an album by American saxophonist and composer Anthony Braxton, recorded in 1981 and released on the Antilles label.

== Reception ==
Professional ratings
Review scores
Source	Rating
AllMusic	4/5 stars
The Rolling Stone Jazz Record Guide	4/5 stars

The AllMusic review by Scott Yanow stated: "Braxton seems quite comfortable playing this complex music, and his diagrams (which serve as song titles) are actually fairly humorous."

== Track listing ==
All compositions by Anthony Braxton are graphically titled and the following attempts to translate the title to text.

1. "Unpk X [Composition No. 40B]" - 7:09
2. "Eggg (Mc- [Composition No. 69N]" - 7:52
3. "Pzq M C Wh [Composition No. 34]" - 6:17
4. "Dk(Rhx) T U Gil-6 [Composition No. 40A]" - 9:04
5. "M R Rjm D [Composition No. 40G]" - 5:00
6. "G-Ho Mhh Rwp [Composition No. 52]" - 6:11

== Personnel ==
- Anthony Braxton – alto saxophone, tenor saxophone, soprano saxophone, E♭ soprano saxophone, contrabass clarinet
- Anthony Davis - piano
- Mark Helias - bass
- Ed Blackwell - drums
