= Palazzo dei Congressi =

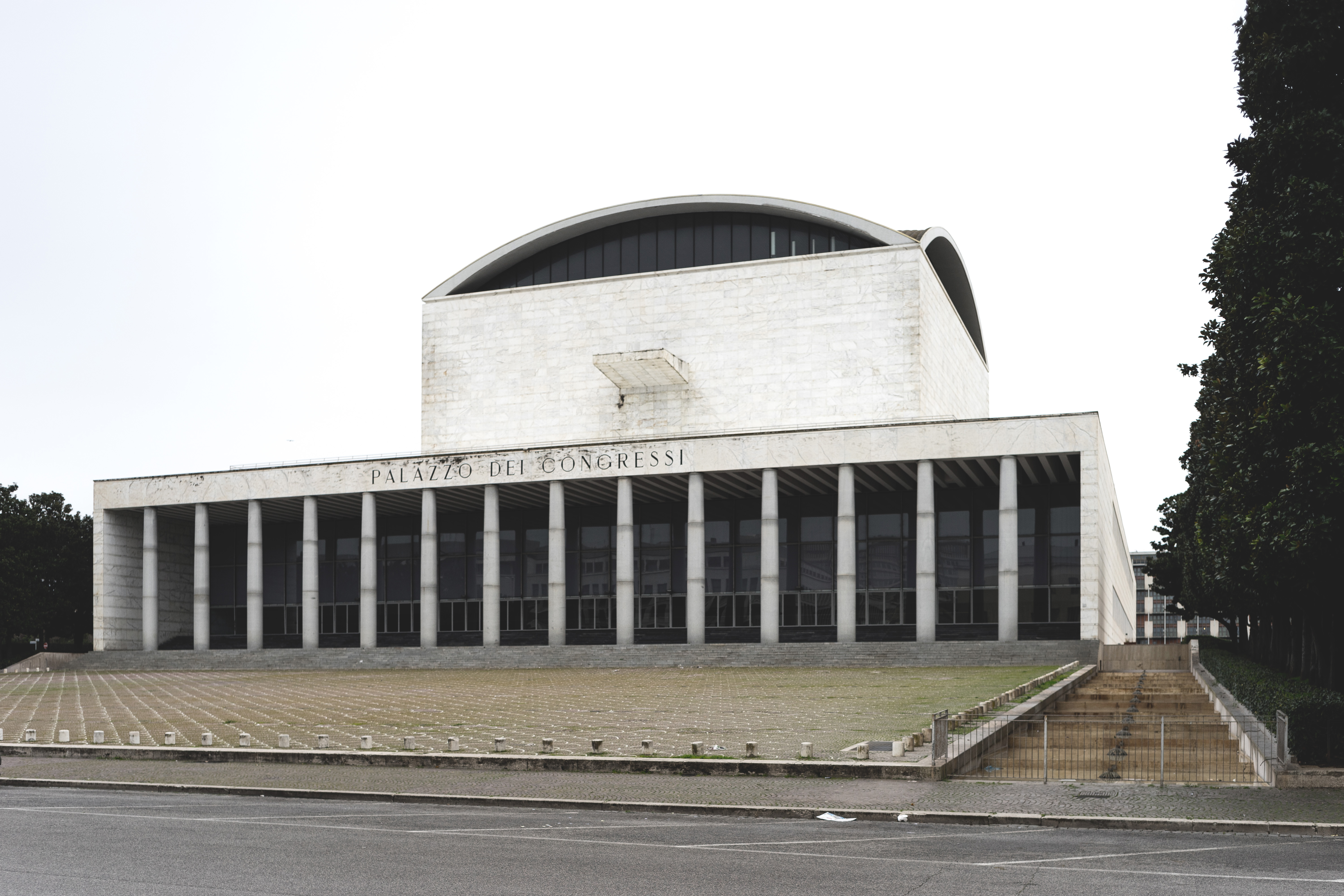
- Front view of the palazzo
- Click on the map for a fullscreen view

General information
- Location: Rome
- Coordinates: 41°50′02″N 12°28′28″E

Palazzo dei Congressi (formally: Palazzo dei Ricevimenti e dei Congressi) is a building located in the EUR district of Rome, Italy. The palazzo was designed by Adalberto Libera for the 1942 Universal Exposition. Construction started in 1938 but was cancelled due to World War II. It was completed in 1954.

Due to its large size, the palazzo hosted the fencing part of the modern pentathlon events for the 1960 Summer Olympics.

== Gallery ==
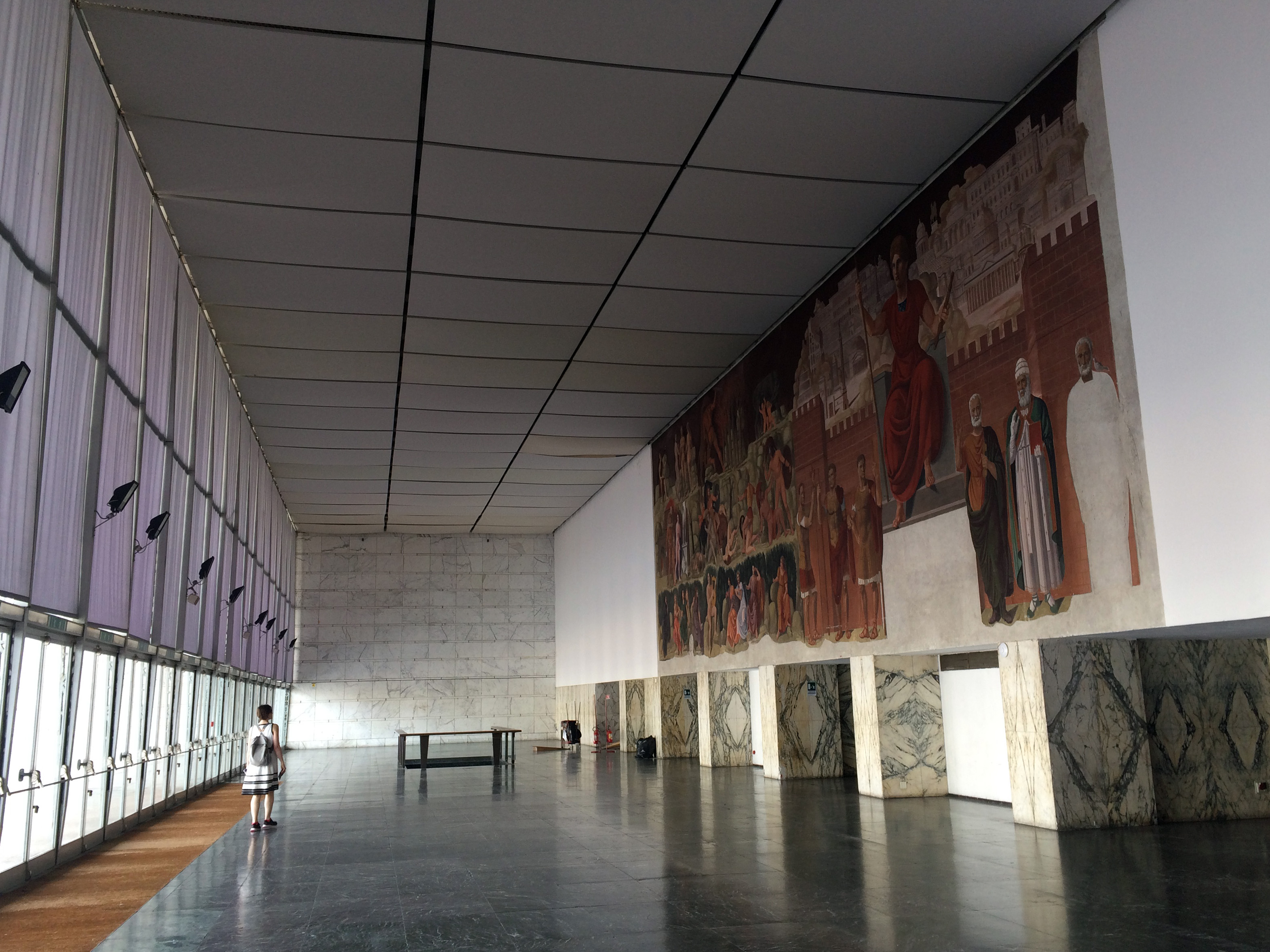
Entrance hall

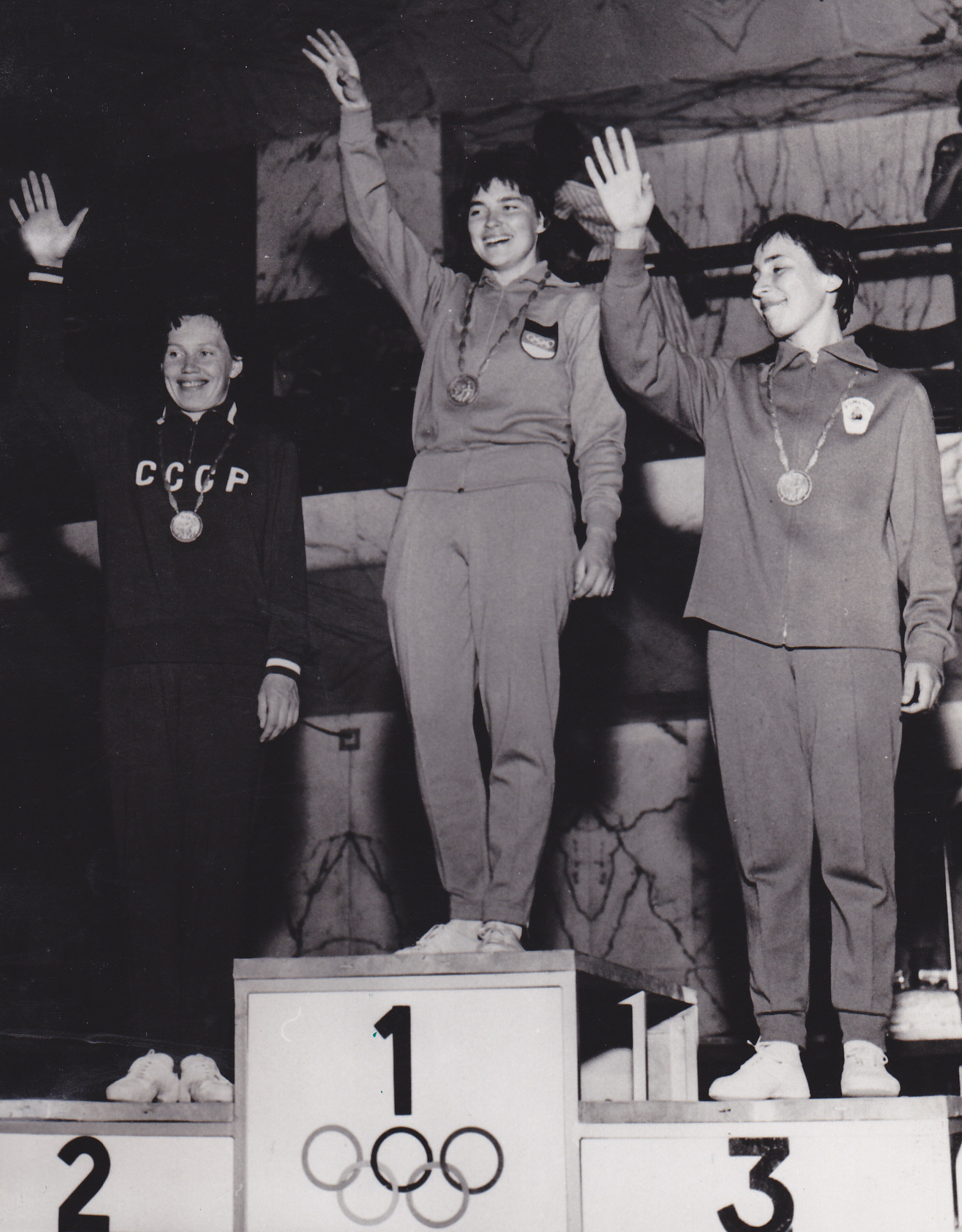
Winners of the 1960 Olympic fencing tournament held in the palazzo

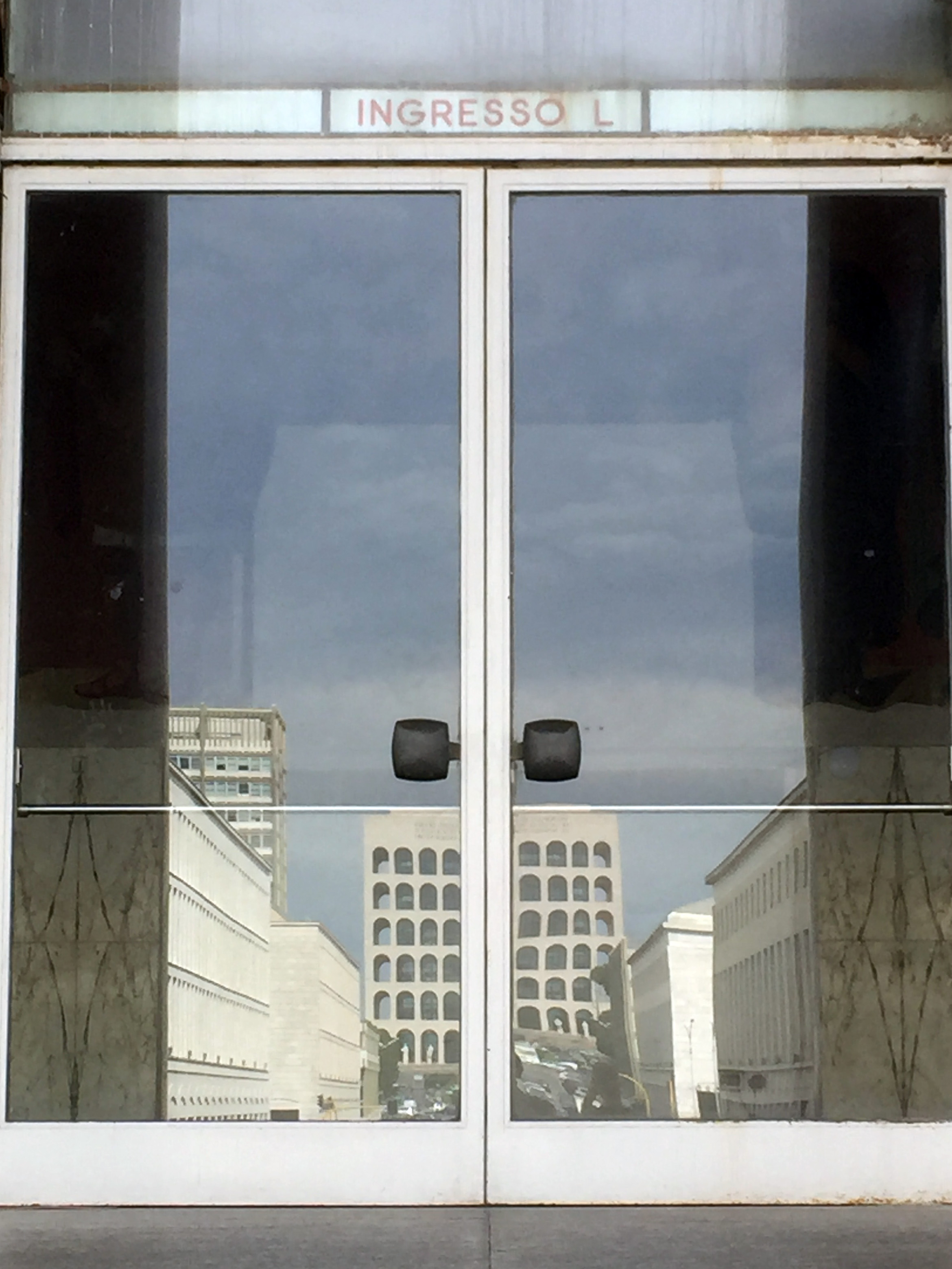
Entrance 'L' at the palazzo. In the reflection of the door the Colosseo Quadrato can be seen reflected.

== In popular culture ==
- The building serves as the backdrop in several shots of the Ac!d Reign Chronicles, a collaborative video project between Grimes and Hana Pestle.
- The building appears in scenes of the 1970 Bertolucci movie The Conformist.
- In 2026 Ridley Scott movie The Dog Stars set in Colorado is used as Denver City Hall.
