= Ernesto Lapadula =

Italian architect

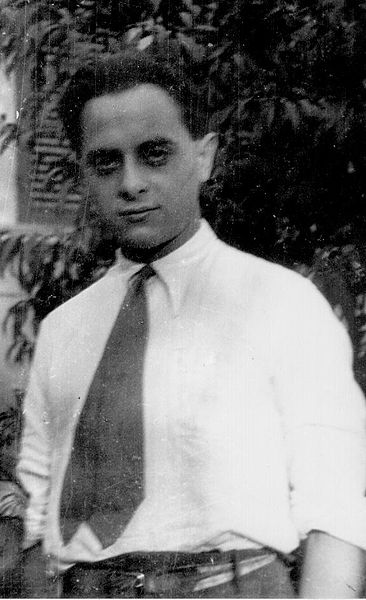
- Born: Ernesto Angelo Lapadula; August 6, 1902; Pisticci, Lucania, Kingdom of Italy
- Died: 24 January 1968 (aged 65); Rome, Lazio, Italy
- Other name: Bruno Lapadula
- Education: Sapienza University of Rome
- Occupations: Architect; urban planner
- Notable work: Palazzo della Civiltà Italiana
- Movement: Rationalism

Ernesto Angelo "Bruno" Lapadula (also La Padula; 6 August 1902 – 24 January 1968) was an Italian architect and urban planner. He designed the Palazzo della Civiltà Italiana in Rome together with Giovanni Guerrini and Mario Romano.

== Biography ==
Ernesto Angelo Lapadula wassborn in Pisticci, Basilicata (then known as Lucania), on 6 August 1902. He attended high school in Melfi, after which he moved to Rome and enrolled at the Sapienza University, graduating in 1931 under the guidance of Marcello Piacentini. In 1928, Lapadula joined the MIAR (Movimento Italiano per l'Architettura Razionale), a movement that played a pivotal role in the formal establishment and promotion of Italian Rationalism. MIAR members initially held their meetings at Lapadula's studio in Piazza del Popolo, Rome. Lapadula also devoted himself to furniture design in collaboration with the Ente Nazionale per l'Artigianato e le Piccole Industrie (ENAPI).

Lapadula worked on several public events organised by the fascist regime, including the Mostra autarchica del Minerale italiano, held in Rome between November 1938 and May 1939. Like many Italian architects and engineers of the fascist era, Lapadula remained loyal to his political beliefs, and his studio attracted opponents of the regime, including artists such as Antonello Trombadori, Lidia Duchini and Leonida Tonucci, as well as various left-wing intellectuals. In 1938, Lapadula was appointed, alongside Giovanni Guerrini and Mario Romano, to design the Palazzo della Civiltà Italiana for the Esposizione universale of 1942.

From 1934 to 1948, he was an assistant professor of Architectural Design at the Sapienza University of Rome. From 1942 to 1946, he taught Interior Architecture at the Royal Academy of Fine Arts in Rome. He was one of the founders of the Art Club on Via Margutta in Rome, which became a meeting place for painters, sculptors, architects, writers, poets, actors and directors in the early post-war years.

In 1948, he left Italy for Argentina, where the National University of Córdoba had offered him the chair of Architectural Composition, and subsequently that of Urban Planning, through his friend, the architect Ernesto Puppo. His arrival at the Argentinian university led to a significant modernisation of architecture and urban planning education. Much of his writing on urban planning and the history of cities dates back to this period. He also contributed to the journals Historia del Urbanismo and Revista Económica. He also worked as an urban planning consultant for the provincial governments of Córdoba, Catamarca and Salta.

Lapadula was also active as a cartoonist, illustrator (under the pseudonym "Bruno di Lucania"), painter, and journalist. After the war, he published articles in various newspapers in which he criticised the methods and quality of the reconstruction of Italian cities, from which young architects had been excluded. In 1963, he returned to Italy, where he primarily devoted himself to drawing and painting. He died in Rome on 24 January 1968.

== Bibliography ==
- Cortesini, Sergio (2004). "LAPADULA, Ernesto". Dizionario Biografico degli Italiani (in Italian). Vol. 63: Labroca–Laterza. Rome: Istituto dell'Enciclopedia Italiana. ISBN 978-88-12-00032-6.
