= For Two Pianos =

Studio album by Anthony Braxton
- Released: 1982
- Recorded: September 13–15, 1980
- Studios: Studio Ricordi, Milano, Italy
- Genres: Jazz, Contemporary classical music
- Length: 49:45
- Label: Arista AL 9559
- Producer: Michael Cuscuna

Anthony Braxton chronology
Composition No. 94 for Three Instrumentalists (1980) (1980)	For Two Pianos (1982)	Composition 98 (1980)

For Two Pianos is an album by composer Anthony Braxton recorded in 1980 and first released on the Arista label in 1982. The album features a composition by Braxton written for two pianists which was subsequently rereleased on CD on The Complete Arista Recordings of Anthony Braxton released by Mosaic Records in 2008.

Professional ratings
Review scores
Source	Rating
Allmusic	2/5 stars
The Rolling Stone Jazz Record Guide	2/5 stars

== Track listing ==
1. "FWQ G x G V (For Two Pianos) [Composition 95]" (Anthony Braxton) - 49:45

== Personnel ==
- Ursula Oppens, Frederic Rzewski - piano, zither, melodica
