= Mostra autarchica del Minerale italiano =

1938–1939 propaganda event in Fascist Italy

Autarchic Exhibition of Italian Minerals
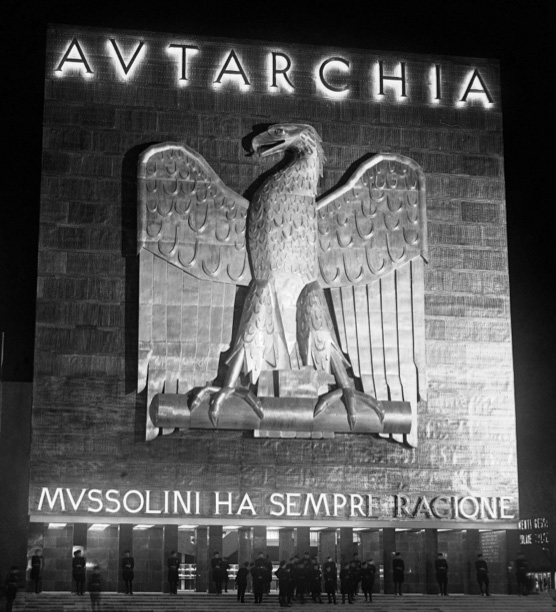
- Façade of the Mostra autarchica del Minerale italiano, 1938. Between the words 'Autarchy' and the Fascist slogan 'Mussolini is always right', stands an aluminium imperial eagle, created by the sculptor Romeo Gregori.
- Native name: Mostra autarchica del Minerale italiano
- Date: November 1938 – May 1939 (1 year)
- Venue: Circus Maximus, Rome
- Location: Rome, Kingdom of Italy
- Theme: Propaganda
- Organized by: Cipriano Efisio Oppo, Luigi Mancini and the National Fascist Party

The Mostra autarchica del Minerale italiano (English: Autarchic Exhibition of Italian Minerals) was a propaganda exhibition held from November 1938 to May 1939 in Rome near the Circus Maximus. Spanning around 35,000 square metres (approximately 8.5 acres), the exhibition comprised 26 pavilions and attracted over a million visitors. It highlighted Italy's mineral resources, promoting economic independence (autarky) through modern pavilions, featuring industrial displays and a full-scale marble quarry.

== Description ==
The exhibition was organized by the National Fascist Party and was directed by Cipriano Efisio Oppo, who was in charge of artistic direction, and Luigi Mancini, who was in charge of technical direction. Mario De Renzi, Giovanni Guerrini, Mario Paniconi and Giulio Pediconi were responsible for the artistic and architectural planning.

The aim of the Mostra autarchica del minerale italiano was to celebrate Italy's progress in exploiting its mineral resources and promote economic self-sufficiency, thereby downplaying the economic sanctions imposed by the League of Nations following the Second Italo-Ethiopian War. It was part of the regime's efforts to cultivate an image of strength and technological prowess, aimed at fostering a sense of national pride.

Each pavilion was dedicated to a different mineral, such as pyrite, lead, zinc, aluminium, mercury and marble. Other pavilions addressed cultural and political topics. These included a Pavilion of Italian Africa, designed by Franco Petrucci and Carlo Enrico Rava to showcase the different kinds of mining in the recently formed Italian East Africa, and a Pavilion of the Defence of the Race, designed within the mining sector by Enrico Prampolini. Of particular importance was the Pavilion of Weapons, which showcased the evolution of weapons in Italy from antiquity to Fascism and reflected the idea of the "inevitability of war".

The focal point of the exhibition complex was the large aluminium imperial eagle, designed by the sculptor Romeo Gregori, which stood out against the monumental Pavilion of Autarchy, Research and Inventions, designed by the architects Ernesto Puppo and Annibale Vitellozzi. The exhibition concluded with the Pavilion of Land Reclamation, which showcased the regime's land reclamation programmes. It was designed by the architects Leonardo Bucci, Francesco Fariello, Giovanni Guerrini, Saverio Muratori, Roberto Nicolini, Ludovico Quaroni and Francesco Santini. Inside and outside the building, there were two pumping stations that were identical to those used for the Pontine reclamation works (1926–1939) and were constantly operational. There was also a 41-metre drilling tower built by Agip for oil exploration that was constantly in use.

As with the Exhibition of the Fascist Revolution, the Mostra autarchica del Minerale italiano featured prominent Italian artists of the time, such as Marcello Nizzoli and Giancarlo Palanti, and made extensive use of photomontages, installations and sculptures. The exhibition had a significant impact on architectural design and construction during the final years of fascism, ultimately shaping the developments of Italian post-war architecture.

== Pavilions ==
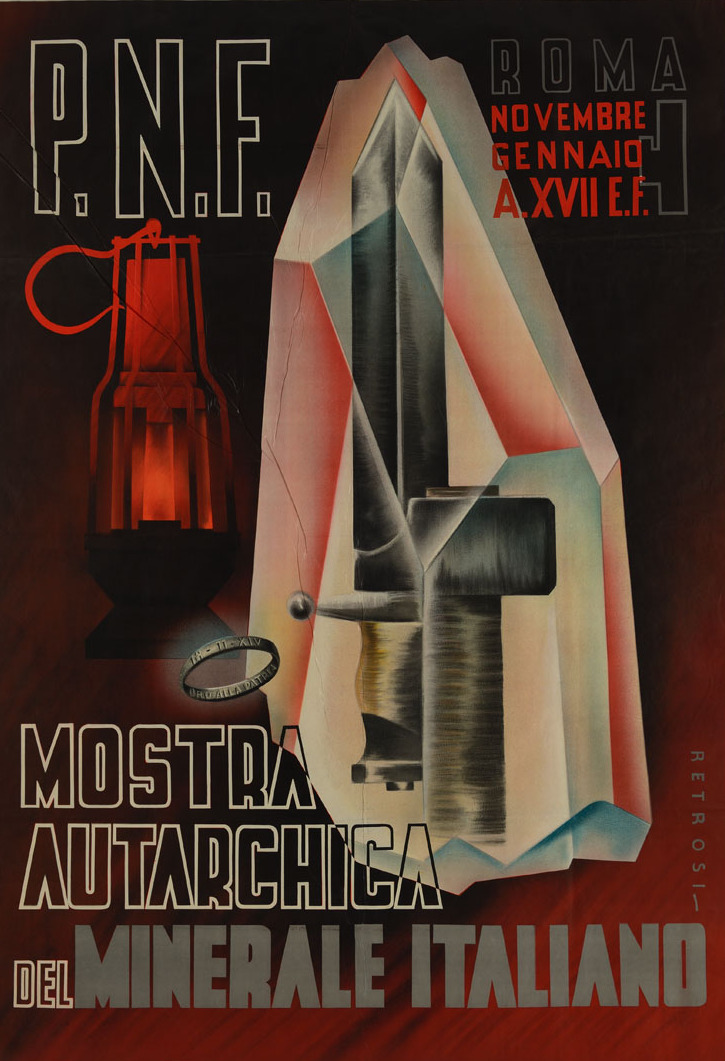
Poster by Virgilio Retrosi promoting the Mostra autarchica del Minerale italiano

- Pavilion of Lignite, designed by Ernesto Lapadula and Mario Romano;
- Pavilion of Talc and Graphite Pavilion, designed by Ernesto Lapadula and Giovanni Guerrini;
- Pavilion of Marl, designed by Ugo Luccichenti;
- Pavilion of Liquid and Gas Combustibles – designed by Mario Paniconi and Giulio Pediconi;
- Pavilion of Solid Combustibles, designed by Eugenio Montuori and Giovanni Guerrini;
- Pavilion of Art, designed by Ernesto Lapadula and Giovanni Guerrini;
- Pavilion of Autarchy, Research and Inventions, designed by the architects Ernesto Puppo and Annibale Vitellozzi;
- Pavilion of Lead and Zinc, designed by Giancarlo Palanti, Franco Albini and Giulio Minoletti;
- Pavilion of Weapons, designed by Mario De Renzi;
- Hall of Pyrites, designed by Marcello Nizzoli;
- Pavilion of Land Reclamation, designed by Leonardo Bucci, Francesco Fariello, Giovanni Guerrini, Saverio Muratori, Roberto Nicolini, Ludovico Quaroni and Francesco Santini;
- Pavilion of Italian Africa, designed by Franco Petrucci and Carlo Enrico Rava;
- Pavilion for the Defence of the Race, designed by Enrico Prampolini.

== Views of the exhibition ==
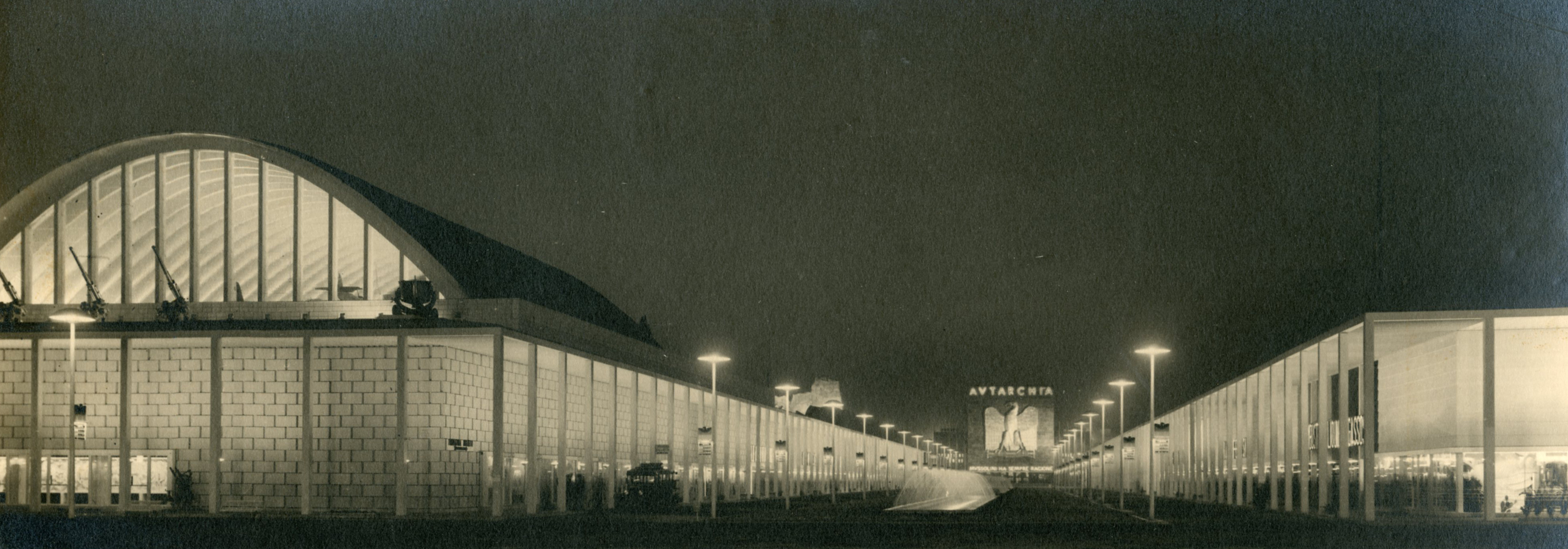
Overview of the exhibition

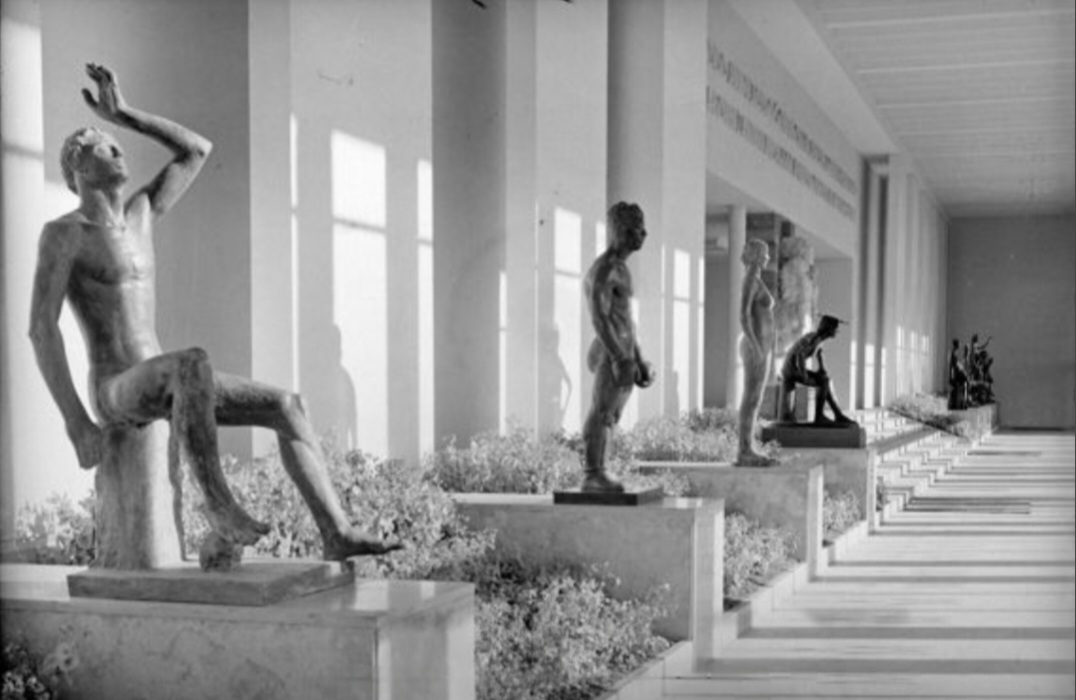
Pavilion of Art

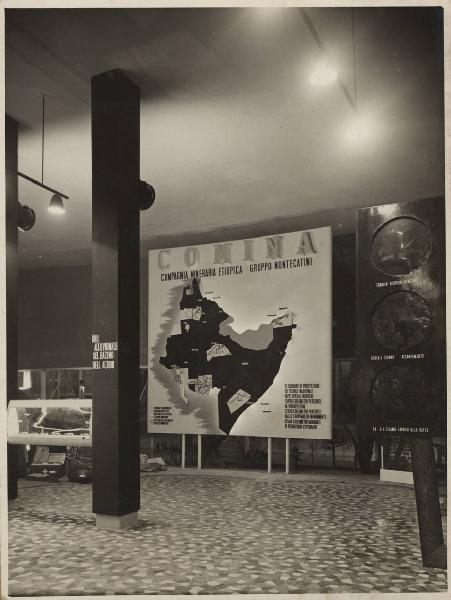
Pavilion of Italian Africa

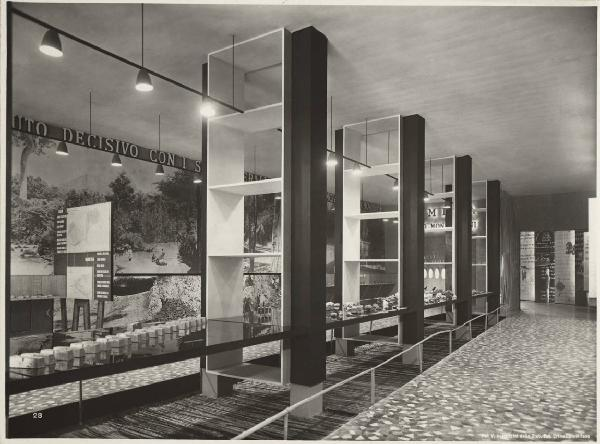
Pavilion of Italian Africa

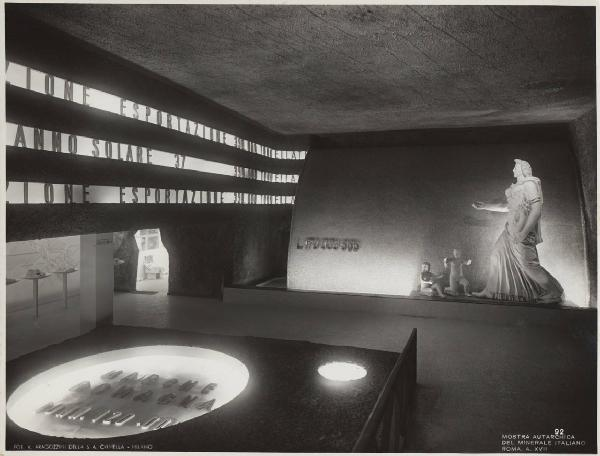
Pavilion of Sulfur

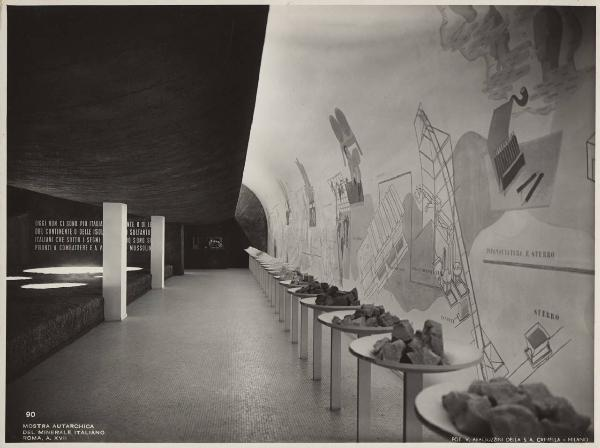
Hall of Pyrites

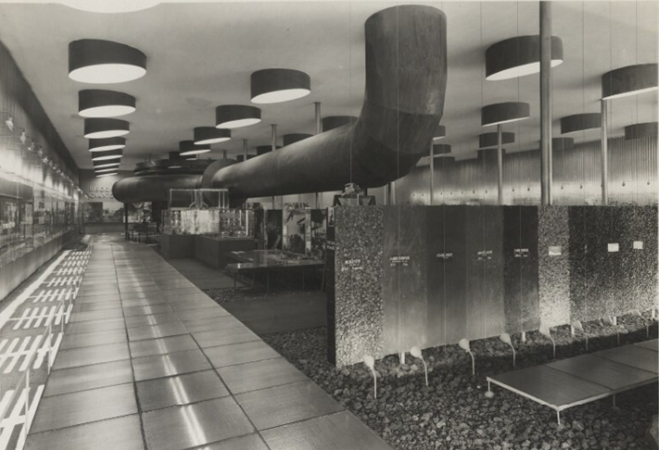
Pavilion of Iron Ores

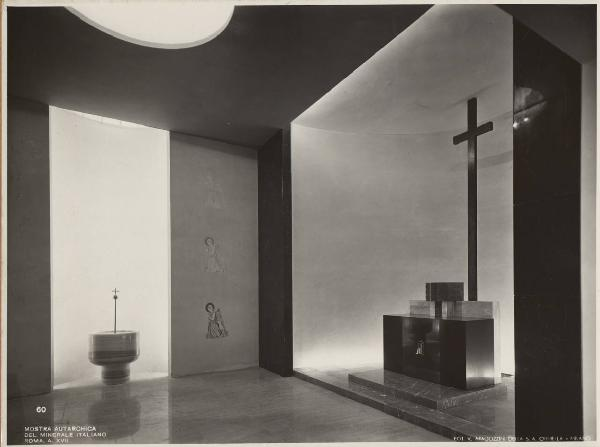
Pavilion of Marbles, Granites and Stones

== Bibliography ==
- Mostra autarchica del minerale italiano. L’autarchia del minerale italiano. Guida della mostra (PDF). Rome: Editrice Nazionale Anonima. 1938.
- Russo, Antonella (1999). Il fascismo in mostra. Storia fotografica della società italiana. Rome: Editori Riuniti. ISBN 978-8835946465.
- Lo, Ruth W. (2024). "Architecture and the Autarchic Exhibition of Italian Minerals". In Reinhold Martin; Claire Zimmerman (eds.). Architecture against Democracy: Histories of the Nationalist International. Minneapolis, MN: University of Minnesota Press. pp. 59–81. JSTOR 10.5749/jj.7220471.8.
- Alù, G. (2026). "The 'brutal force' of the mines: natural resources and the aesthetic of extraction in Fascist Italy". Modern Italy. 31 (1): 1–26. doi:10.1017/mit.2025.10075.
