= Palazzo della Civiltà Italiana =

Building in EUR, Rome

Palace of Italian Civilization
- Palazzo della Civiltà Italiana
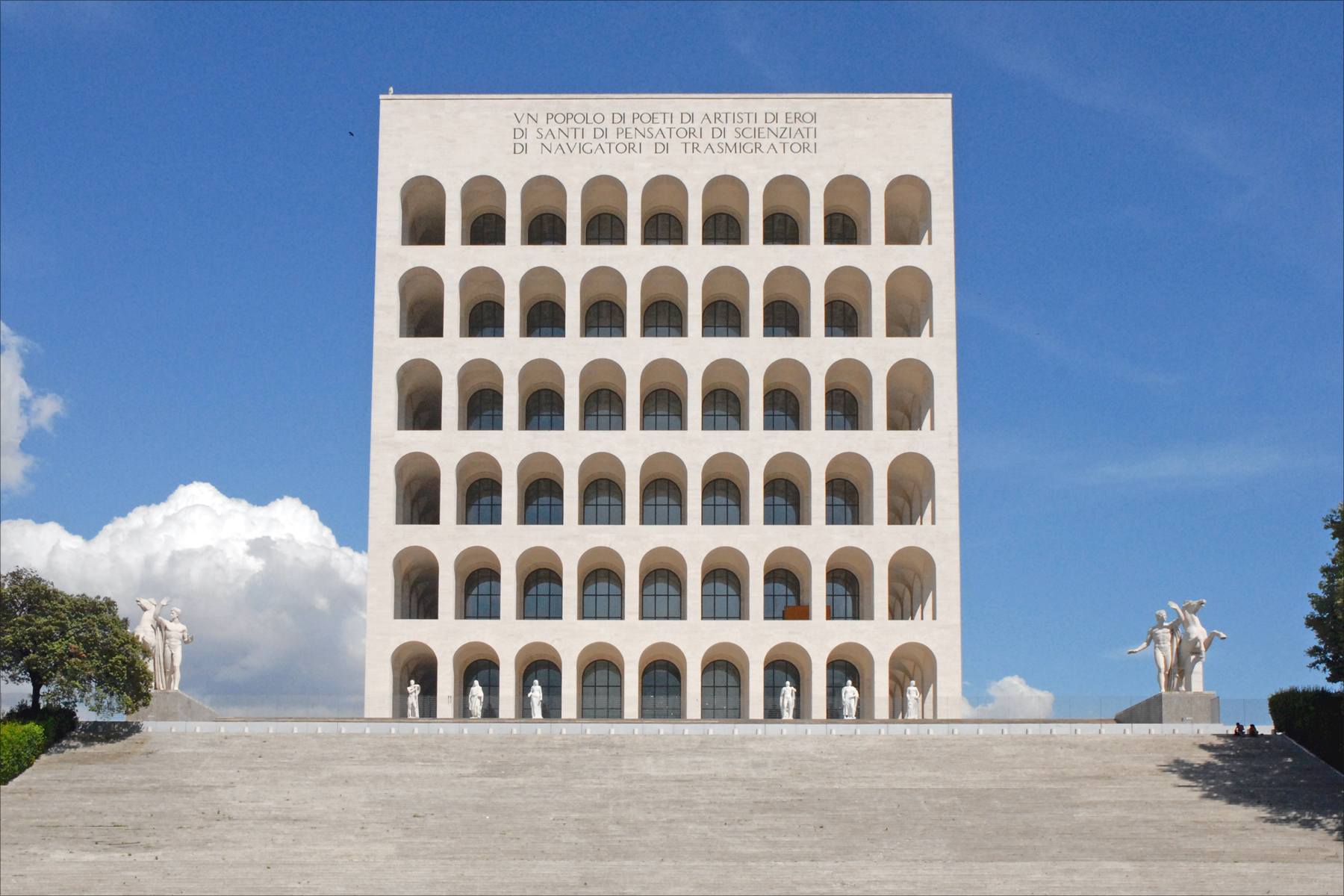
- View of the building from west
- Click on the map to see marker

General information
- Location: EUR, Rome, Italy
- Coordinates: 41°50′12″N 12°27′55″E

Design and construction
- Architects: Giovanni Guerrini, Ernesto Lapadula, Mario Romano

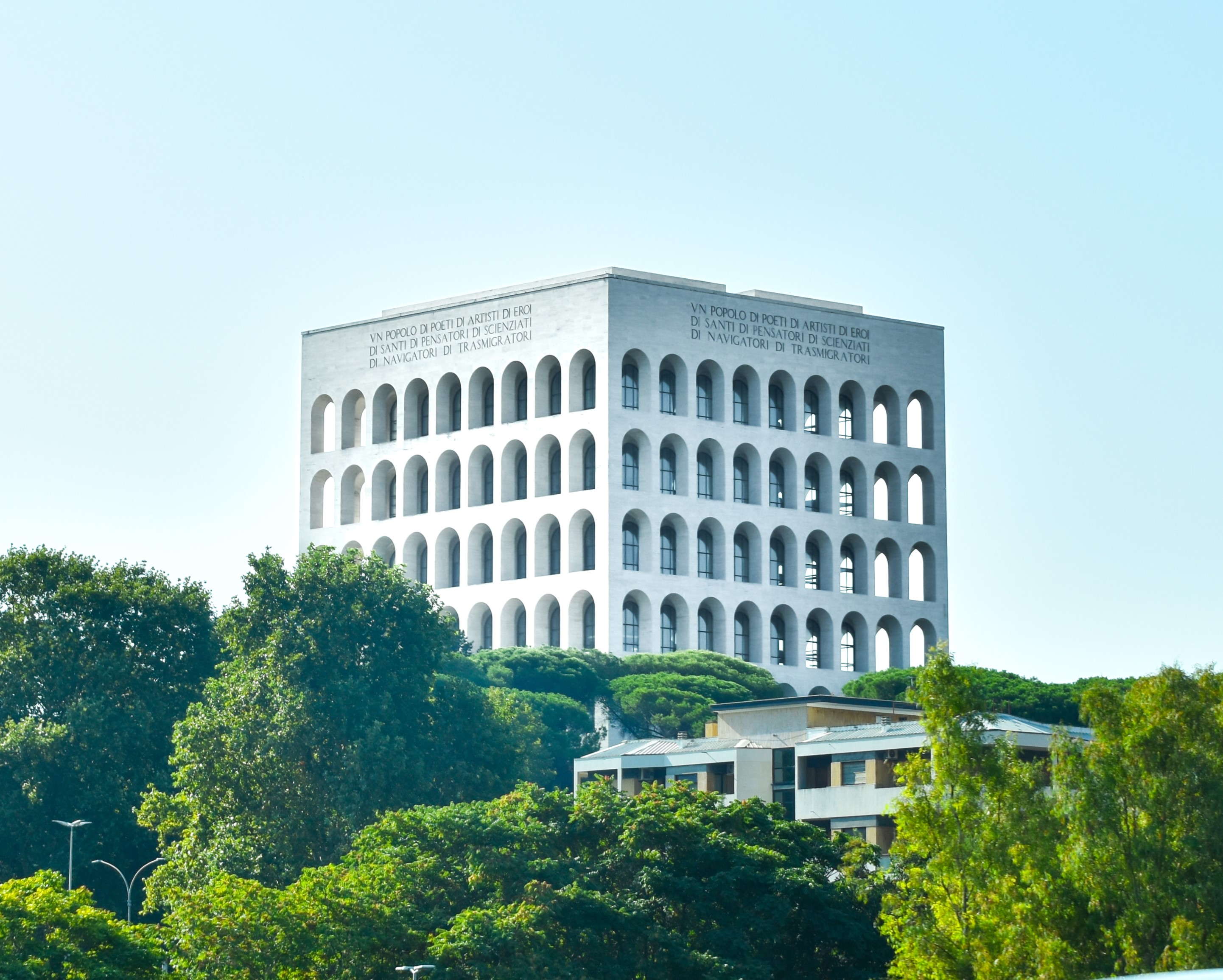
Palazzo della Civiltà Italiana viewed from Autostrada A91

The Palazzo della Civiltà Italiana ("Palace of Italian Civilization"), also known as the Palazzo della Civiltà del Lavoro ("Palace of Working Civilization"), or in everyday speech as the Colosseo Quadrato ("Square Colosseum"), is a building in the EUR district in Rome, Italy. It was designed in 1938 by three Italian architects: Giovanni Guerrini, Ernesto Lapadula, and Mario Romano. The building is an example of Italian Rationalism and fascist architecture with neoclassical design, representing romanità, a philosophy which encompasses the past, present, and future all in one. The monumentality of the structure was meant to reflect the fascist regime's new course in Italian history. The design of the building draws inspiration from the Colosseum with rows of arches. According to legend, the structure's six vertical and nine horizontal arches are correlated to the number of letters in the Italian dictator Benito Mussolini's name.

The Palazzo was inaugurated on November 30, 1940, despite being unfinished. Ten years after its completion, the Palazzo was adorned with statues on the ground floor and steps that ascend to its entrance. The building was designed to be the Museum of Italian Civilization at the 1942 World Fair, demonstrating the superiority of Italian architecture. The building is located in the Esposizione Universale Roma (EUR) district of Rome, also known as the E42 district, which serves as a symbol of Italy's National Fascist Party. Ultimately the building was never used for its intended purposes following the aftermath of World War II, however the EUR has since been revitalized as a residential and business district. The building is now used as the headquarters for the Italian fashion house Fendi.

== History ==
The Palazzo della Civiltà Italiana was constructed as part of the program of the Esposizione Universale Roma, a large business center and suburban complex, initiated in 1935 by Benito Mussolini for the planned 1942 world exhibition and as a symbol of the Fascist regime. In 1935, Italy requested to host the upcoming world's fair in 1941, however the date was pushed to 1942, the twentieth anniversary of the Fascist Party taking control of Italy, through intentional advertising of the event as E'42. After the world's fair, the area was planned to serve as a center of urbanization that was an extension of Rome, with its area equal in size to Rome's Centro Storico. Design teams proposed different architectural plans for the building; Mussolini ultimately favored the plan designed by architects Giovanni Guerrini, Ernesto Lapadula, and Mario Romano for its rationalism. Construction began in 1938 and finished in 1943. The final plans were revised by Marcello Piacentini, the superintendent of the E42 Architecture Service, who decided to add a travertine exterior to the facade and accentuate the classical features of the design. The structure is also considered one of the most representative examples of fascist architecture at the EUR. The progress of the building was documented through the Fascist newsreel documentary service Istituto Luce, which captured various events including Mussolini planting a tree on the grounds in 1937. The documentation of the progress was a form of publicity and also provided insight into the daily lives of laborers working on the project. The Palazzo was inaugurated on November 30, 1940, as the centerpiece of the Esposizione; one thousand of the workers were laid off by the end of the year.

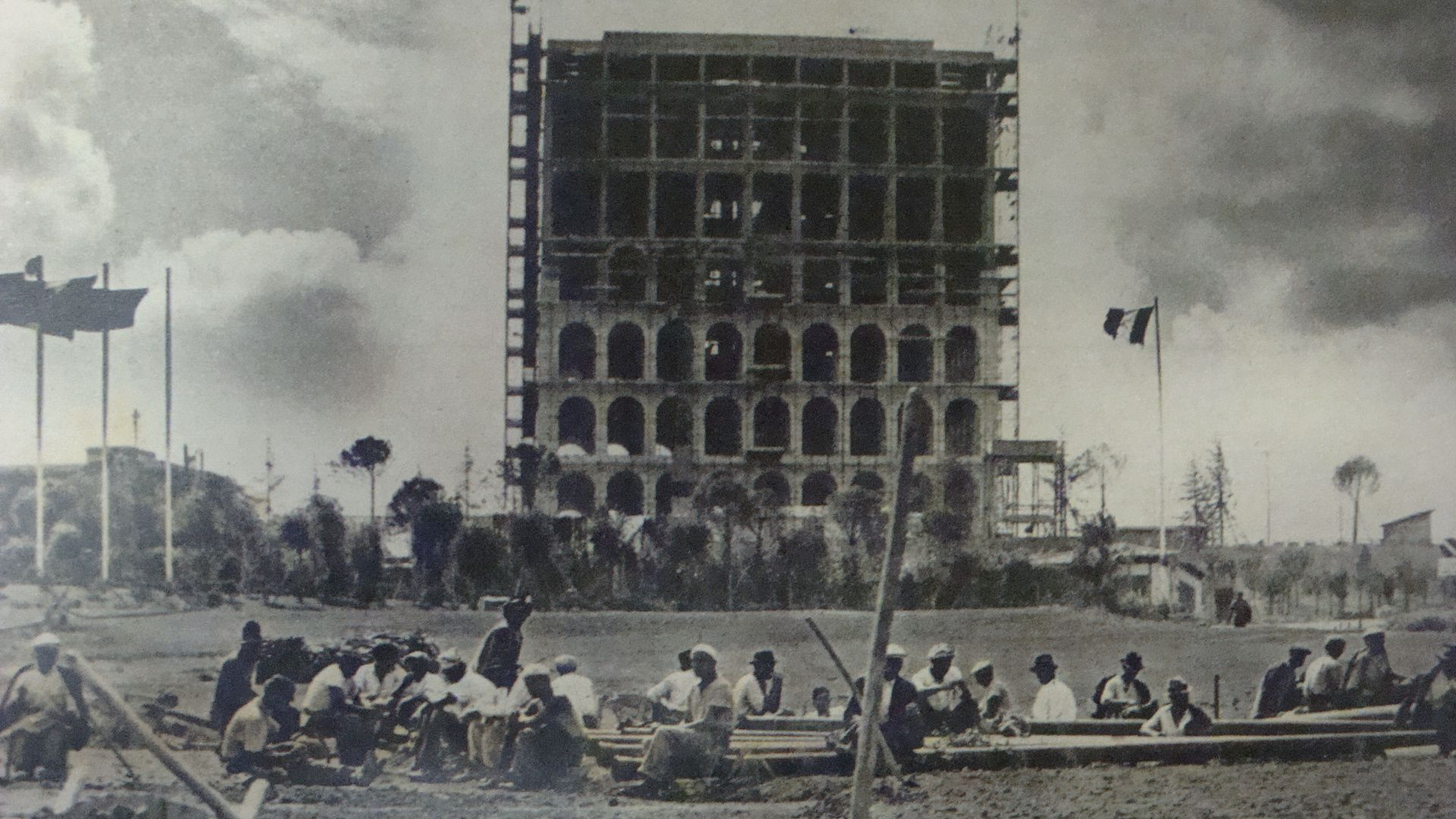
View of the building during its construction (1940)

The world's fair was cancelled on June 3, 1941, while the building was being finished. By 1942, the EUR was declared a dead-end project, and the fall of the Fascist regime followed in 1943. The Palazzo stood empty and abandoned for over a decade following the aftermath of World War II. The building became the backdrop for post-war cinema, featured as an obsolete structure, symbolic of the downfall of the Fascist regime. In order to reclaim the EUR from its fascist history, postwar Italians decided to make new use of the district for suburban housing to remedy the rise in the Italian population that occurred during the Fascist era. In the 1950s, the EUR was rebranded as a modern, business district in order to break away from its fascist stigma. The rebranding and revival of this district was further expedited by Rome's candidacy for the 1960 Olympics; by the end of the decade, the EUR had become a residential quarter as well as a flourishing administrative district. The building opened its doors to the public for the first time in 1953. It hosted the Roma 1953 Agricultural Exhibition (EA53).

Between 2003 and 2008, the palace was closed to the public for restoration. Since 2015, it has housed the headquarters of luxury fashion label Fendi, and will continue to do so for at least the next 15 years. Fendi will reportedly pay 2.8 million euros per year to occupy the space. The ground floor of the building will reportedly be left open to house exhibitions celebrating Italian craftsmanship.

== Construction ==
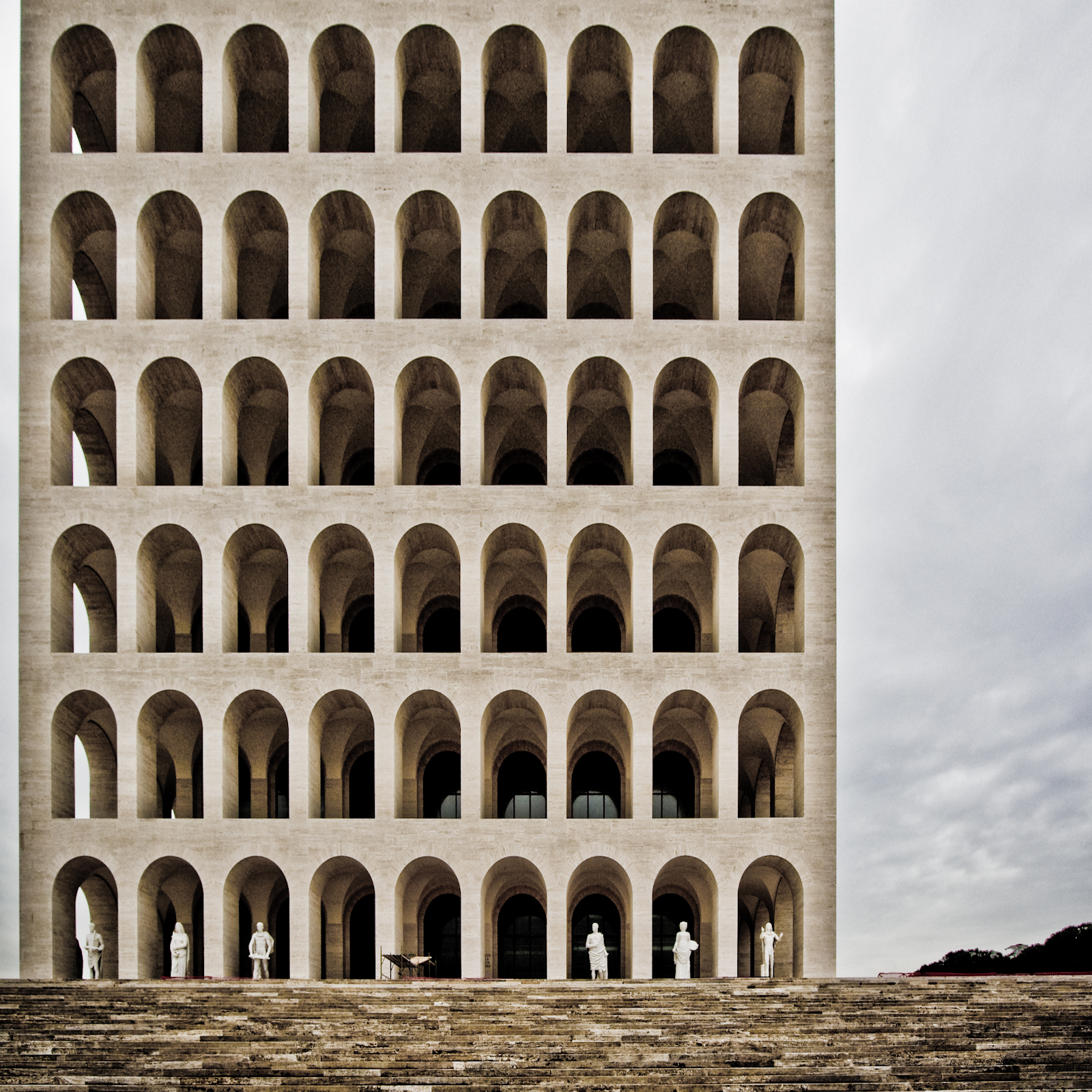
Square Colosseum with Travertine Cladding

The Palazzo was designed by Guerrini, Lapadula, and Romano, however the plans were modified by engineers and their director, Gaetano Minnucci, who was ultimately able to make any changes he saw fit. The Project Development Office of the Architectural Service, in collaboration with the building contractor, oversaw the logistics of the construction and positioning of the travertine cladding as well as the foundation of the building. Like many other buildings of the EUR district, the Palazzo's materials consist of a concrete foundation and skeleton, clad in travertine, a stone used to give the effect of solid marble.

=== Travertine cladding ===
The Palazzo appears to be entirely made of stone, however its stone facade is reinforced with a concrete skeleton. The stone slabs measure between 55 and 85 cm tall and approximately 210 cm wide; the thickness of the stone slabs vary from 5 to 20 cm throughout the structure with the thickest slabs on the lower floors. The reduction in the thickness of the slabs in the upper floors is meant to accentuate the height of the structure. The impression of the building's height is further enhanced through a slight inward incline in the facade by around 3 cm per floor.

Before the arches could be made, the building required a strong concrete and brick pilaster backbone. The pillars are 120 cm wide on all floors, but the thickness, or depth, of the pillars varies from 193 to 210 cm. Perforated bricks were used to fill the gaps between the pilasters and cladding. To ensure that the structure was well bonded, each slab was anchored with two rod-iron clamps.

After the framework of the structure was secure, the stone arches were anchored to the pilasters with iron clamps. The arches support not only their own weight, but also the weight of the two perforated brick supports, the walls above that fill the gap between the arch and the floor, the wall behind the slabs, and the weight of the cladding of upper arches. The concrete pilasters fortify the force from the weight above and transfers it down, thus the arches along with the pilasters are essential for the Palazzo's structural stability.

Work began on the cladding in 1940 and finished less than a year later. The Palazzo was cleaned and polished upon completion to achieve a smooth, uniform surface throughout, and finally coated with essence of nicotine in water. The uniform structure was not ornamented, emphasizing the fascist architectural ideals.

== Design ==
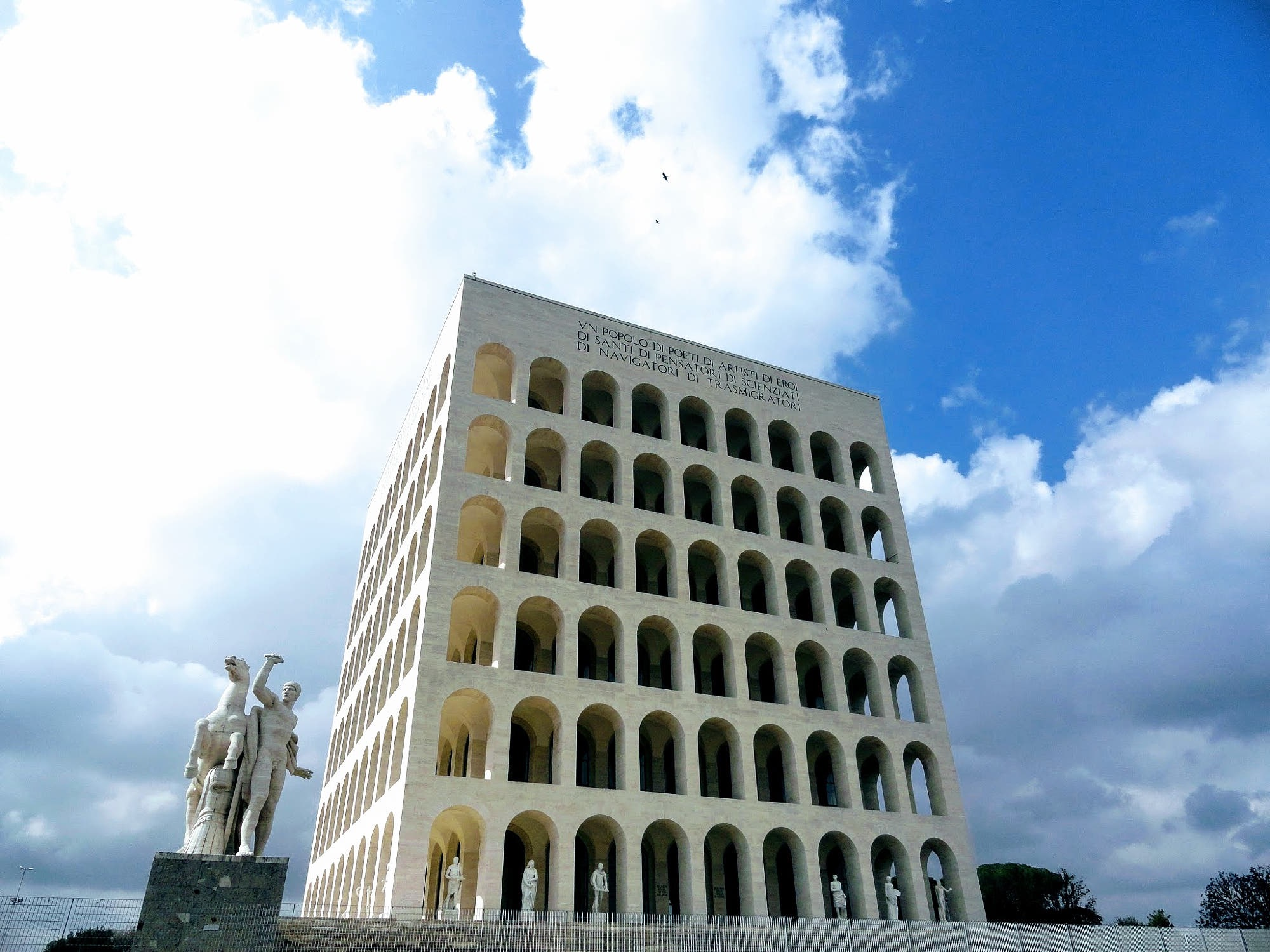
View of the Palazzo della Civiltà Italiana and one of its statues

The EUR provides a large-scale image of how urban Italy might have looked if the Fascist regime had not fallen during the war – large, symmetrical streets and austere buildings of limestone, tuff and marble, in either Stile Littorio (lictor), inspired by ancient Roman architecture, or Rationalism. Its architectural style is often called simplified neoclassicism. Marcello Piacentini, the coordinator of the commission for E42, based it on the Italian Rationalism of Pagano, Libera, and Michelucci.

The design of the "Square Colosseum" was inspired by the Colosseum, and the structure was intended by Benito Mussolini as a celebration of the older Roman landmark. Similar to the Colosseum, the palace has a series of superimposed loggias, shown on the facade as 6 rows of 9 arches each. The number of arches changed several times during the design process and was originally intended to be 8 rows of 13 arches.

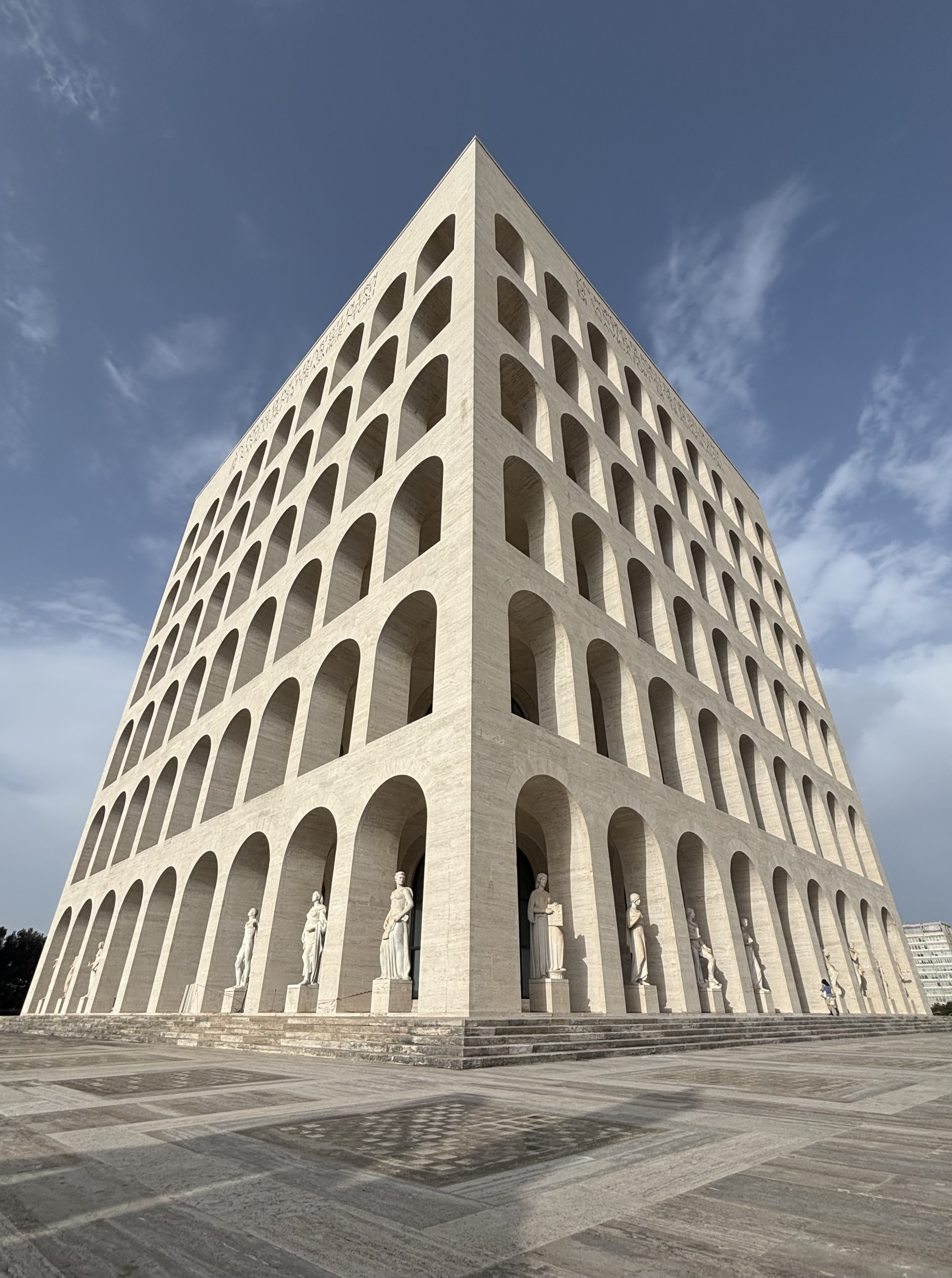
Vista del Palazzo della Civiltà Italiana, angolo sud-ovest

The Palazzo is entirely clad in travertine, a characteristic of many buildings in the EUR district. The structure is a parallelepiped, which sits atop a square base (51.6 m by 51.6 m) that stands on a stylobate. Each of the four sides of the building has a height of 57.75 m, which was the largest travertine facade in Italy at the time of construction. Each facade of the building is equipped with six rows of nine symmetrical and identical arches that contribute to the open plan. The architects wanted the building to appear "not as if it were 'clad' in stone, but as if it were actually 'made' of stone." The base covers an area of 8,400 square meters, and the building has a volume of 205,000 cubic meters with a height of 68 meters (50 meters measured from the base).

=== Epigraphy ===
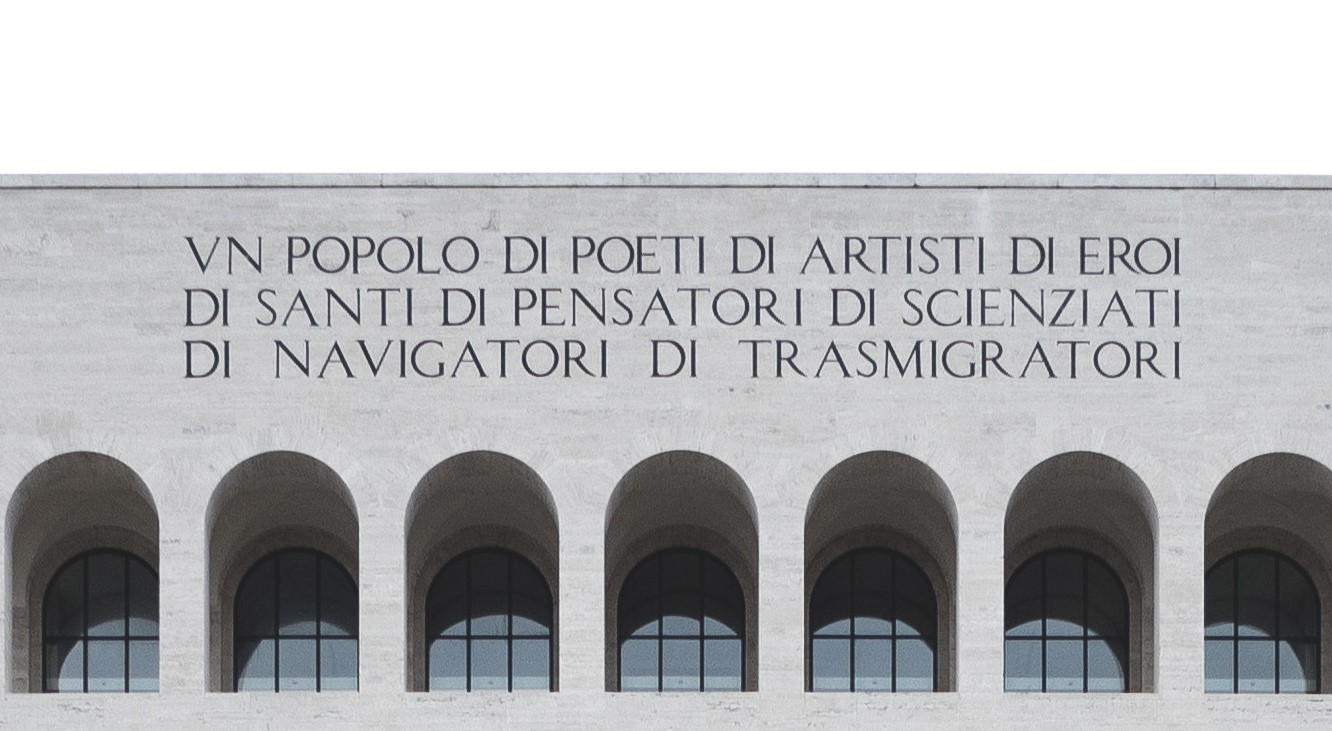
Inscription from Mussolini's speech: "Un popolo di poeti, di artisti, di eroi, di santi, di pensatori, di scienziati, di navigatori, di trasmigratori"

Atop all four sides of the building runs an inscription taken from a speech that Mussolini delivered on 2 October 1935: "Un popolo di poeti, di artisti, di eroi, di santi, di pensatori, di scienziati, di navigatori, di trasmigratori" ("a nation of poets, of artists, of heroes, of saints, of thinkers, of scientists, of navigators, of migrators").

The inscription featured on the Palazzo refers to Mussolini's glorification of the Fascist regime, particularly claiming the superior qualities he attributed to the Italian race. The epigraphy for the building was originally planned to be excerpts from Augustus's Res gestae, a monumental inscription of the life and accomplishments of the first Roman emperor, however Mussolini's speech was ultimately chosen for the final design. The typeface is consistent with fascist design principles, being square and simple, easily legible from below, and carved to maximize shadows and contrast with the polished marble facade. Epigraphy on Italian Fascist architecture served to impose the regime's beliefs and ideologies on the public, specifically targeting an educated audience.

=== Statuary ===
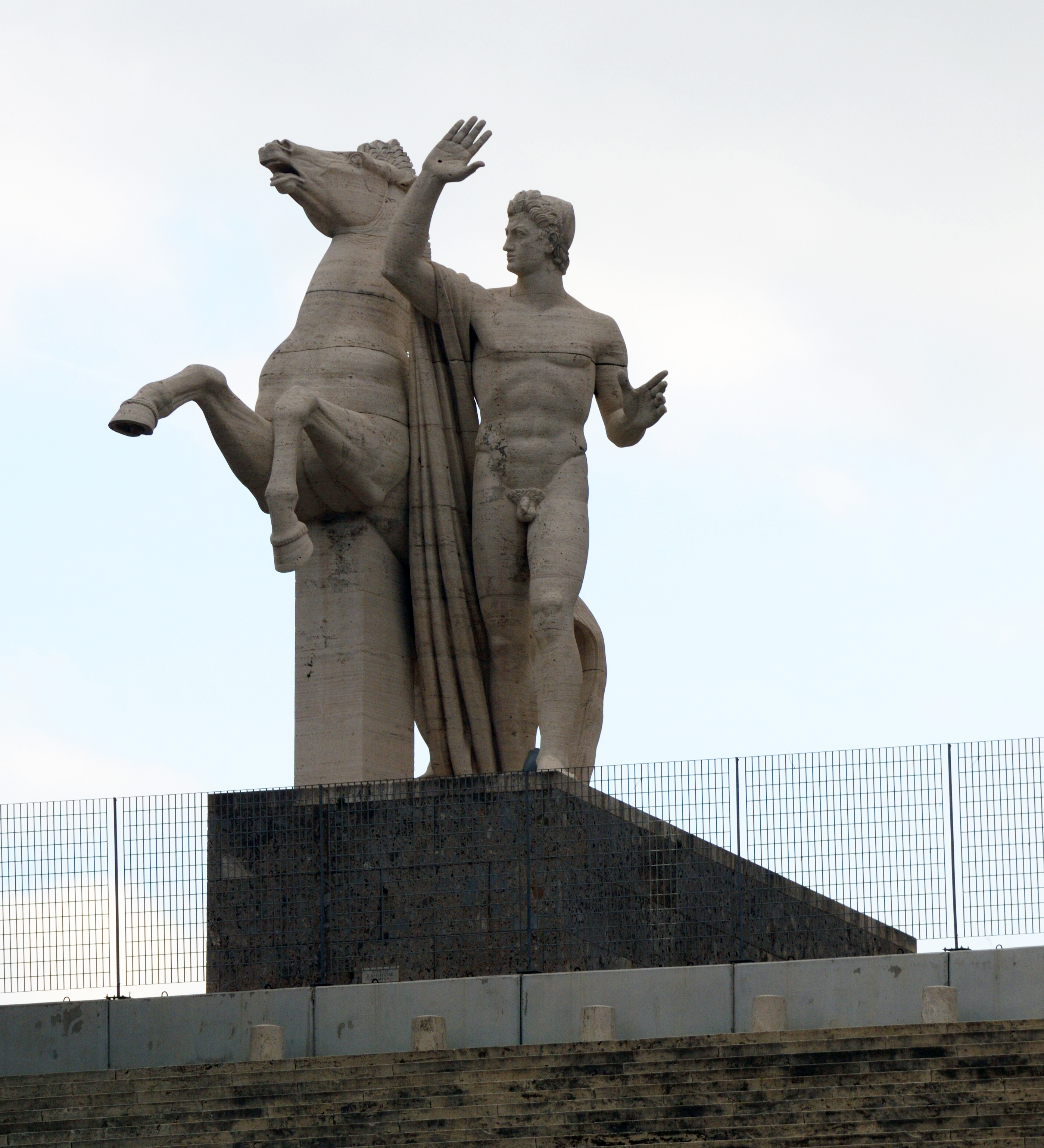
Dioscuri of the Palazzo della Civiltà italiana

At the four corners of the podium are placed four equestrian sculptural groups by Publio Morbiducci and Alberto de Felci, representing the Dioscuri, the two mythical Greek heroes, sons of Zeus and Leda. Around the base of the building are 28 additional statues of approximately 3.4 meters in height, each under an arch, illustrating various industries and trades. These statues were added in 1942, having been constructed by eight companies specialized in the working of Carrara marble in the provinces of Lucca and Massa-Carrara. Moving around the building clockwise from the entrance, the statues represent:

- Heroism
- Music
- Handicrafts
- Political Genius
- the Social Order
- Labor
- Agriculture
- Philosophy
- Commerce
- Industry
- Archaeology
- Astronomy
- History
- Inventive Genius
- Architecture
- Law
- the Supremacy of Navigation
- Sculpture
- Mathematics
- the Genius of the Theatre
- Chemistry
- Printing
- Medicine
- Geography
- Physics
- the Genius of Poetry
- Painting
- Military genius

== In popular culture ==
The Palazzo della Civiltà Italiana has been used many times in film as a visually oppressive force, associated with Italian Fascism. The EUR district itself is often portrayed negatively in Italian cinema, implanted into the background as a symbol of Fascist remnants. The Palazzo appeared in a segment of the anthology film Boccaccio '70 titled Le Tentazioni del Dottor Antonio. The segment was set in the EUR district, using the Palazzo in particular to symbolize "the rigid moral order that the Christian Democrats wanted to impose on Italian society." The building is prominently displayed in one dream sequence where Anita Ekberg's body juxtaposes the rigid and stern neoclassical structure. In the film The Belly of an Architect, the Palazzo is featured as a figure climbs the steps and disappears from view into one of the many arches; the scene cuts to one of the Dioscuri statues that decorate the building and then features the building's inscription: "Un popolo di poeti, di artisti, di eroi, di santi, di pensatori, di scienziati, di navigatori, di trasmigratori." Throughout film, the Palazzo is commonly used as a symbol of conservatism associated with Italian Fascism.

=== Appearance in film and television ===
Because of its bold appearance and iconic status, the palace has appeared in a number of films, including (in chronological order):

- Rome, Open City (1945)
- Boccaccio '70 (1962), in the segment Le Tentazioni del Dottor Antonio by Federico Fellini, with Peppino de Filippo and Anita Ekberg
- The Last Man on Earth (1964) by Ubaldo Ragona and Sidney Salkow, with Vincent Price
- The Belly of an Architect (1987) by Peter Greenaway
- Hudson Hawk (1991) by Michael Lehmann, with Bruce Willis
- Fatal Frames (1996) by Al Festa, with Rick Gianasi
- Cruel Summer (1998) music video by Ace of Base
- Titus (1999) by Julie Taymor, with Anthony Hopkins
- Equilibrium (2001) by Kurt Wimmer, with Christian Bale
- Pasolini (2014) by Abel Ferrara
- Zoolander 2 (2016) by Ben Stiller
- I Can Quit Whenever I Want: Masterclass (2017) by Sydney Sibilia
- Emily in Paris (2025), season 5: Episode 2, "Got to be Real."

== Sources ==
- Maristella Casciato (2002). "Il Palazzo della civiltà italiana: cronaca del concorso". In Maristella Casciato; Sergio Poretti (eds.). Il Palazzo della civiltà italiana. Architettura e costruzione del Colosseo quadrato (in Italian). Milano: Federico Motta. ISBN 88-7179-358-7.
