= Giovacchino Forzano =

Italian playwright and librettist (1884–1970)

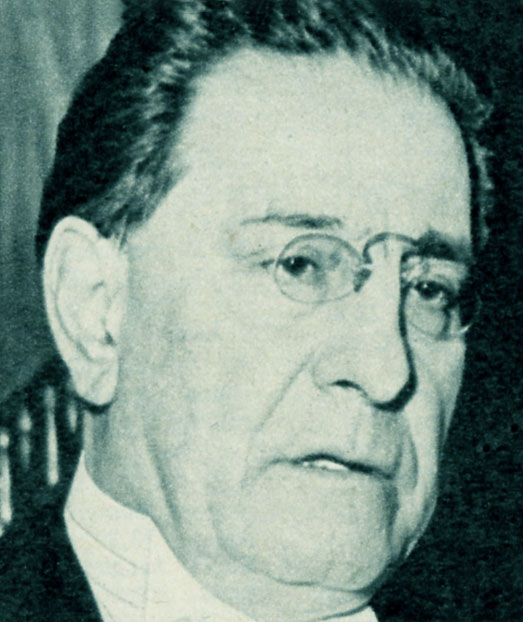
Giovacchino Forzano

Giovacchino Forzano (Italian pronunciation: [dʒovakˈkiːno forˈtsaːno]; 19 November 1884 – 28 October 1970) was an Italian playwright, librettist, stage and film director. A resourceful writer, he authored numerous popular plays and produced opera librettos for most of the major Italian composers of the early twentieth century, including the librettos for Giacomo Puccini's Suor Angelica and Gianni Schicchi.

== Biography ==
Forzano was born in Borgo San Lorenzo, in the province of Florence.

He studied medicine before embarking on a brief career as an operatic baritone. He then began studying law and, after finishing his diploma, became a freelance journalist, contributing regularly to several of Italy's major newspapers. In 1914 he met and befriended Puccini who asked him to write the librettos for his Il trittico, a collection of three one-act operas. Forzano agreed to write the librettos for two of the works, Suor Angelica and Gianni Schicchi, but declined Il tabarro saying that he preferred to create his own plots (Giuseppe Adami wrote the libretto for Il tabarro). Il trittico premiered at the Metropolitan Opera on 14 December 1918 to high acclaim. With the success of Il trittico, Forzano was soon approached by other composers to provide librettos, including Alberto Franchetti, Ruggero Leoncavallo, Ermanno Wolf-Ferrari, Mario Peragallo, Mary Rosselli Nissim, Umberto Giordano, and Pietro Mascagni.

In 1920 Forzano became a stage director at La Scala, serving in that capacity through 1930. During the 1920s he became one of the most successful and frequently performed dramatists of his day. He later became a producer and director of propaganda films for the National Fascist Party under Benito Mussolini. In 1957 he published a volume of memoirs, Come li ho conosciuti, which reveal interesting perspectives on the composers with whom he collaborated. He also participated in several filmed documentaries that recall his work on Gianni Schicchi with Puccini.

He died at Rome in 1970.

== Work as a dramatist ==
Forzano's plays were light-weight, but extremely popular and he was one of the most frequently performed playwrights of the period. The subjects of his plays were many and varied: some were historical with settings as different as early Renaissance Florence or France during the Revolution; others were contemporary, comedies of manners often dealing with issues around societal preconceptions with regard to the role of women or the nature of relationships. As a result of his success in the world of popular theatre, his high-profile directing of a well-received open-air performance of Gabriele d'Annunzio's La figlia di Iorio at the Vittoriale in 1927 and his involvement with the Carro di Tespi, a travelling theatre initiative supported by the Fascist regime, Forzano came to the attention of Benito Mussolini who, in 1929 suggested an artistic collaboration. This eventually resulted in the composition of three plays, the joint authorship of which was never explicitly acknowledged in Italy, but which nonetheless was common knowledge. Although Forzano derived a certain amount of kudos from the association with the Dictator, it does not seem that he received any direct financial benefit, unlike many other cultural figures of the time who received subsidies of various kinds from the fascist authorities. Unfortunately, however, Forzano became associated indissolubly with Mussolini and the regime, both as a result of these plays, the last of which Cesare was first performed in 1939, and on account of the films which Forzano produced and directed during the 1930s, beginning with Camicia nera in 1933, all of which were staunchly supportive of the regime. Following the Fall of Fascism Forzano was never able to free himself from this association and, consequently, never able to capture his former position, either as a dramatist or cultural figure.

== Opera librettos ==
- Notte di leggenda (Alberto Franchetti, 1915)
- Lodoletta (Pietro Mascagni, 1917)
- Suor Angelica (Giacomo Puccini, 1918)
- Gianni Schicchi (Giacomo Puccini, 1918)
- Edipo re (Ruggero Leoncavallo, 1919)
- Il piccolo Marat (Pietro Mascagni, 1921)
- Glauco (Alberto Franchetti, 1922)
- I Compagnacci (Primo Riccitelli, 1924)
- Gli amanti sposi (Ermanno Wolf-Ferrari, 1925)
- Sly (Ermanno Wolf-Ferrari, 1927)
- Il re (Umberto Giordano, 1929)

== Principal theatrical works ==
Le campane d Lucio (1916) Madonna Oretta (1918) Sly (1920) Lorenzino (1922) Il conte di Brechard (1924) I fiordalisi d'oro (1924) Il dono del mattino (1924) Gutlibi (1925) Ginevra degli Almieri (1926) Madama Roland (1927) Pietro il Grande (1929) Jack Broder (1929) Danton (1929) Il colpo di vento (1930) Campo di Maggio (with Mussolini; 1930) Don Buonaparte (1931) Villafranca (with Mussolini; 1931) Racconti d'autunno, d'inverno e primavera (1937) Cesare (with Mussolini; 1939)
