= Willibald Alexis =

German novelist

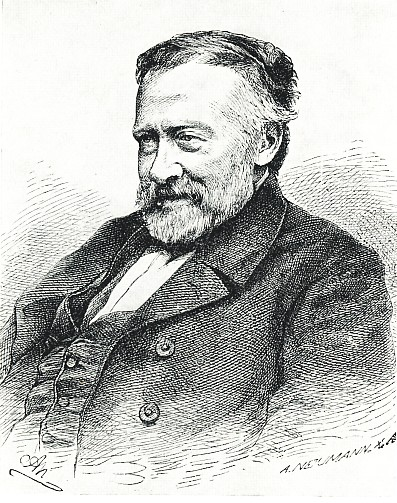
Alexis

Willibald Alexis, the pseudonym of Georg Wilhelm Heinrich Häring (29 June 1798 – 16 December 1871), was a German historical novelist, considered part of the Young Germany movement.

== Life ==
Alexis was born in Breslau, Silesia. His father, who came of a French refugee family, named Hareng, held a high position in the war department. He attended the Werdersche Gymnasium in Berlin, and then, serving as a volunteer in the campaign of 1815, took part in the siege of the Ardenne fortresses. On his return, he studied law at the University of Berlin and the University of Breslau and entered the legal profession, but he soon abandoned this career and devoted himself to literature. Settling in Berlin, he edited, from 1827 to 1835, the Berliner Konversationsblatt, in which for the first two years he was assisted by Friedrich Christoph Forster (1791–1868); and in 1828 was created a doctor of philosophy by the University of Halle. In 1852 he retired to Arnstadt in Thuringia, where after many years of broken health he died.

== Works ==
Having made his name first known as a writer by an idyll in hexameters, Die Treibjagd (1820), and several short stories, his literary reputation was first established by the historical novel Walladmor (1823), which was published as being "freely translated from the English of Sir Walter Scott, with a preface by Willibald Alexis". The work became immediately popular and was translated into several languages, including English.

It was followed by Schloss Avalon (1827), in which the author adopted the same tactics and with equal success. Soon afterwards, Alexis published a number of successful short stories (Gesammelte Novellen, 4 vols., 1830–1831), some books of travel, and in the novels Das Haus Dusterweg (1835) and Zwölf Nächte (1838) showed for a while a leaning towards the "Young German" school. In Cabanis (1832), however, a story of the time of Frederick the Great, he entered the field of patriotic-historical romance, in which he earned the name of "der Märkische Walter Scott" (Walter Scott of the Mark).

From 1840 onwards he published at short intervals a series of romances, each dealing with some epoch in the history of Brandenburg. His novel Der Werwulf is set at the time of the Protestant Reformation. In 1840 his historical novel Der Roland von Berlin was published. It was the basis for Ruggero Leoncavallo's opera of the same name. This was followed by Der falsche Woldemar (1842), Die Hosen des Herrn von Bredow (1846–1848), Ruhe ist die reste Bürgerpflicht (1852), Isegrimm (1854), and Dorothe (1856).

Alexis also made a name for himself in the field of criminology by commencing in 1842, in conjunction with the publicist Julius Eduard Hitzig (1780–1849), the publication of Der neue Pitaval (36 vols., Leipzig, 1842–1865; newer edition, 24 vols., Leipzig, 1866–1891), a collection of criminal anecdotes culled from all nations and all times.
