= Konrad Dryden =

American author (born 1963)

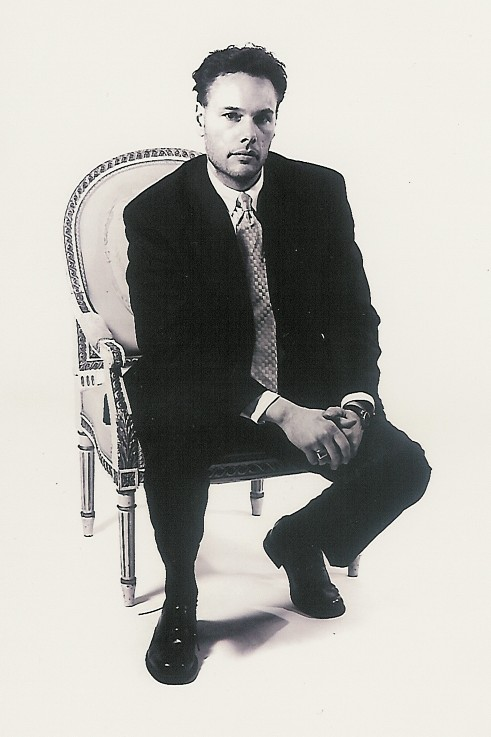
- Born: Konrad Claude Dryden; September 13, 1963 (age 63); Pasadena, California, U.S.
- Occupations: Musicologist; biographer; journalist
- Spouse: Countess Florence de Peyronnet (1991–2007)
- Writing career
- Period: 1990–present
- Genre: Opera

Konrad Claude Dryden (born September 13, 1963) is an American author who has written extensively on Italian opera, particularly about the movement known as Verismo.

== Lineage ==
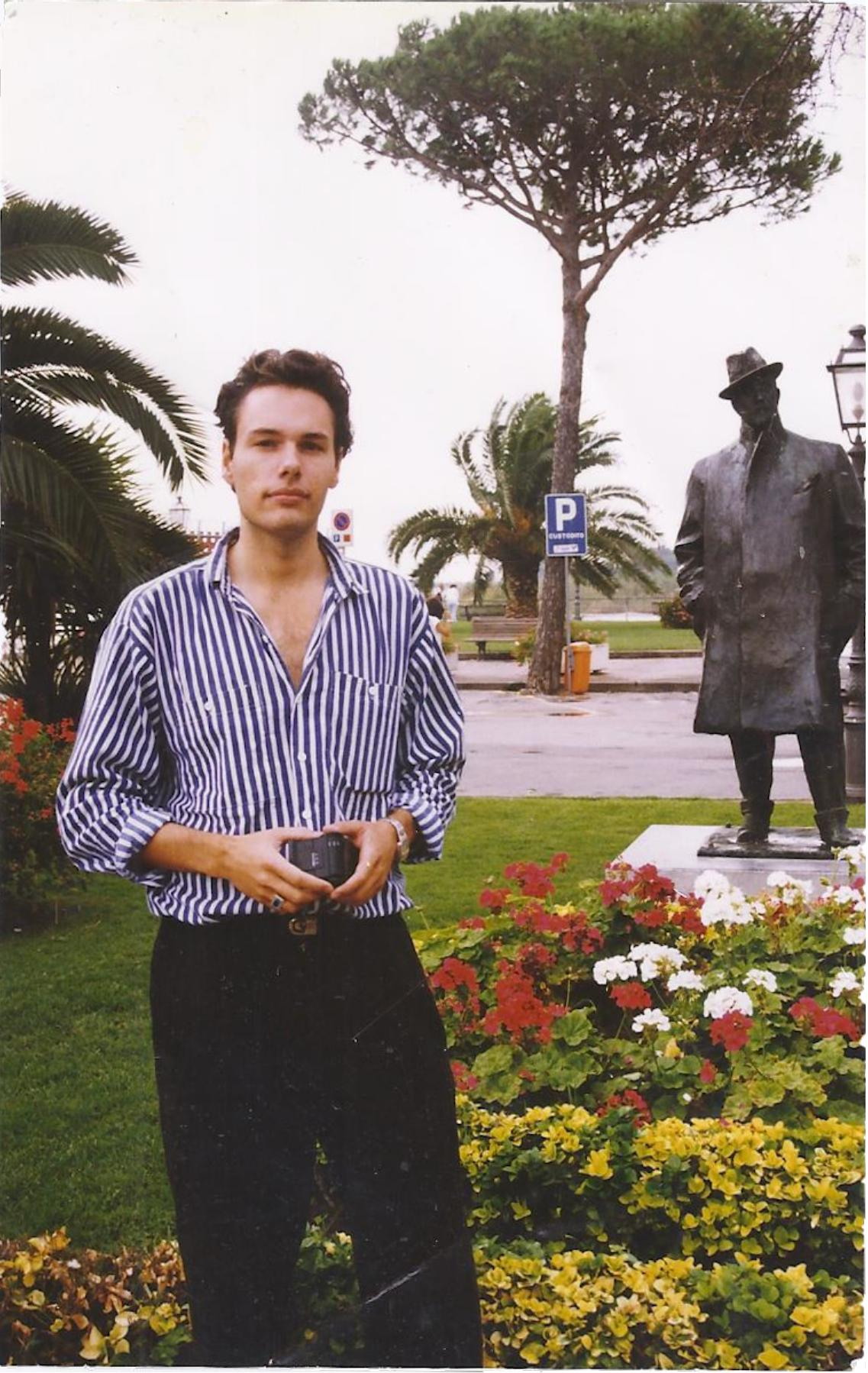
Dryden in Torre del Lago, Italy, 1987

Dryden is the son of a British father, Kenneth Dryden (an RAF pilot and descendant of poet laureate John Dryden), and a German mother, Ingeborg Rudhart, a descendant of Ignaz von Rudhart, Prime Minister of Greece under the reign of King Otto of Greece. His cousin, Karin Seehofer, is married to Bavaria's former Minister President and current Federal Minister of the Interior, Horst Seehofer.

== Life ==
Born in Pasadena, California, Dryden moved to Northern California at an early age. In Marin County, he attended St. Rita School and Sir Francis Drake High School (his math teacher being Olympic medalist Archie Williams). Performances at the War Memorial Opera House in San Francisco sparked an innate love for the lyric theatre, leading him to train as an operatic baritone at the San Francisco Conservatory of Music in 1980 with the French-Canadian tenor Léopold Simoneau.

A European resident since 1981, Dryden continued his operatic tuition with the baritone Karl Schmitt-Walter in Munich, Germany. Schmitt-Walter was noted for his numerous recordings as well as his involvement with the reopening of the Bayreuth Festival after World War II. Following Schmitt-Walter's death, Dryden, from 1982 to 1983, continued his studies with the American tenor James King, both in Munich and Salzburg. Thereupon followed a move to Feldafing on Lake Starnberg, where Dryden spent the better part of two years working with the German baritone Josef Metternich. In Italy, mezzo-soprano Gianna Pederzini helped Dryden to complete his studies with the baritone Gino Bechi in Florence. Bechi, one of Italy's most noted baritones, had sung Alfio in the La voce del padrone recording of Mascagni's Cavalleria rusticana under the composer's direction in 1940.

Dryden recorded an album of arias and songs in 1987 (reviewed in Das Orchester during the same year) before making his operatic debut in a nationally televised production as Uberto in Pergolesi's La serva padrona in 1988. In 1991, Dryden married the historian Countess Florence de Peyronnet (born 1968). Their son, Werther Claude Dryden, was born in 1991.

== Career ==
In 1999, Dryden published Riccardo Zandonai, A Biography, the first fully documented monograph devoted to the composer of Francesca da Rimini. Written specifically for this volume were forewords by Renata Scotto as well as the composer's daughter, Tarquinia Jolanda Zandonai. A second biography, Leoncavallo: Life and Works, with a foreword by Plácido Domingo and Piera Leoncavallo, appeared in 2007. An earlier edition, sponsored by Baroness Hildegarde von Münchhausen, who had purchased a large amount of the composer's estate, preceded this in 2007. Following the publication, Dryden took part in a series of interviews recorded for German radio (NDR) and the Bayerische Kammeroper. His most recent biography, Franco Alfano, Transcending Turandot (foreword by Magda Olivero), was released in 2010. For these monographs, Dryden himself insisted on translating into English all archival material from German, Italian, and French.

Since the year 2000, Dryden has regularly contributed essays and articles for the following opera houses and concert halls: San Francisco Opera; Royal Opera, Covent Garden; Metropolitan Opera, New York; Teatro Real, Madrid; Concertgebouw, Amsterdam; Gran Teatro del Liceu, Barcelona; Opéra de Paris; San Diego Opera; Wexford Festival Opera; Rome Opera; Deutsche Oper Berlin and English National Opera. He has lectured in the United States, Switzerland and Germany as well as writing articles for Opera Quarterly, CPO Records, Naxos Records and Die Musikforschung. Dryden was the subject of a biographical entry in volume 267 of Contemporary Authors, published in 2008. Since the year 2000, Dryden has been a contributing editor of the German music magazine Opernglas. During this time, he was noted for numerous interviews dealing with such personalities as Magda Olivero, Dame Kiri Te Kanawa, Sherrill Milnes, Martina Arroyo, Carlisle Floyd, Birgit Nilsson, Astrid Varnay, Wolfgang Wagner, Simonetta Puccini, Inge Borkh, Gina Cigna, Dame Eva Turner, Maria Carbone, Adelaide Saraceni, Virginia Zeani and Alexander, Crown Prince of Yugoslavia. Dryden also befriended bestselling author Barbara Cartland.

Dryden may be credited for advancing musical research in the realm of Italian operatic composers during the Fin de siècle that, until the advent of his works, centered almost exclusively on Puccini. His uncovering of original manuscripts – whether of composers Giacomo Meyerbeer and Ruggiero Leoncavallo or author E. T. A. Hoffmann – enabled many archives to acquire invaluable material. These findings also helped clear up erroneous historical data found for decades in reference guides, including The New Grove Dictionary of Music and Musicians and the German music encyclopedia Musik in Geschichte und Gegenwart, among others. Whether it was simply the inaccurate date of Leoncavallo's birth, or that his opera Edipo Re was solely an adaptation of the earlier Der Roland von Berlin or that his Sardou-based La jeunesse de Figaro never existed was, until these publications, relatively, if not completely, unknown. Dryden received his Ph.D. in 2003 from the University of Marburg, Germany. From 2004 to 2018 Dryden was Professor of Humanities at the University of Maryland, University College, Europe.

== Works ==
- Riccardo Zandonai, A Biography, 1999. ISBN 0820436496
- Leoncavallo: Life and Works, 2007. ISBN 0810858800
- Franco Alfano, Transcending Turandot, 2010. ISBN 0810869705

== Sources ==
- Alan Mallach, The Autumn of Italian Opera, Northeastern University Press, 2007.
