= Edipo re (opera) =

Opera by Ruggero Leoncavallo

Edipo Re
- Opera by Ruggero Leoncavallo (disputed)
- Librettist: Giovacchino Forzano
- Language: Italian
- Based on: Oedipus Rex by Sophocles
- Premiere: 1920; Chicago Opera

Edipo Re is an opera generally attributed to Ruggero Leoncavallo, although there is some dispute about the authorship. The libretto is by Giovacchino Forzano. It had its premiere in Chicago in 1920.

The opera was published posthumously in 1920 and was completed and orchestrated by Giovanni Pennacchio. Leoncavallo biographer Konrad Dryden disputes whether Leoncavallo composed the opera at all, stating that "it is extremely doubtful whether Edipo Re, Maschera nuda or the short operetta Il primo bacio had anything to do with the composer at all." Other sources continue to attribute it to Leoncavallo with completion by Pennacchio.

Edipo Re was premiered by the Chicago Opera in 1920. It had its Italian operatic premiere in 1958, although a performance was broadcast on Italian radio in 1939.

The plot of Edipo Re is based on Sophocles' Oedipus Rex, although the libretto excluded most of the choruses.

== Reception ==
According to music journalist William Schoelle, the opera contains "a dynamic opening chorus, excellent vocal writing, a major aria for Oedipus, and a sublime love duet whose only disappointing factor is its brevity. Contemporary reviews of the New York premiere in 1921 were less kind. The New York Herald stated that "The music as a whole is declamatory and episodic in its melody. It promises to rise to a fine height in the final utterances of the King's despair, but the promise is not wholly fulfilled. The Herald went to say that lead singer Titta Ruffo, while "impressive" and well suited to the role, "could not restore to life the tremendous figure of the Oedipus Tyrannus of Sophocles killed by the deadly music of Leoncavallo." The New York Tribune said that "Except for the entrance of Jocasta and fugitive lyric moments, which soothe the ears, the music is noisy from beginning to end, lacking in depth, and wholly without distinction."

Some of the music for the opera is taken from Leoncavallo's 1904 opera Der Roland von Berlin.
