= Der Roland von Berlin =

1840 novel by Willibald Alexis

Der Roland von Berlin is a historical novel by Willibald Alexis. Published in 1840, it was the basis for composer Ruggiero Leoncavallo's 1904 opera of the same name.

Ruggero Leoncavallo "Der Roland von Berlin" was a historical drama in four acts with his own libretto, based on the novel, and had its first performance in Berlin's Royal Opera House on December 13, 1904.

The Plot Berlin 1422. Conflicts arise between the artisans and the Grand Council of Patricians, disagreements that the Elector Frederick seeks to resolve. The weaver Henning Mollner is in love with Alda, daughter of Mayor John of Ratenow, but, since they belong to such different social classes, their love is hopeless. Indeed, the girl is promised in marriage to Melchior, the son of the powerful Sir Thomas Wintz. Because the Grand Council continues to exploit the artisans and ignore their demands, Henning is appointed leader of the revolt and nicknamed Roland, after the paladin whose statue stands in a large square in Berlin. The Elector, in disguise, travels to Berlin to discover the true state of affairs, realizing the validity of the artisans' demands. When the Elector appears at the city gates to quell the revolt, the mayor delays opening them for fear of an invasion. Henning himself then breaks the locks to open the gate. A soldier, mistaking him for an enemy, kills him. The Elector will bring justice to the artisans' demands, and Roland will be remembered as a martyr for freedom.
