= Chatterton (opera) =

Opera by Ruggero Leoncavallo

- Opera by Ruggero Leoncavallo
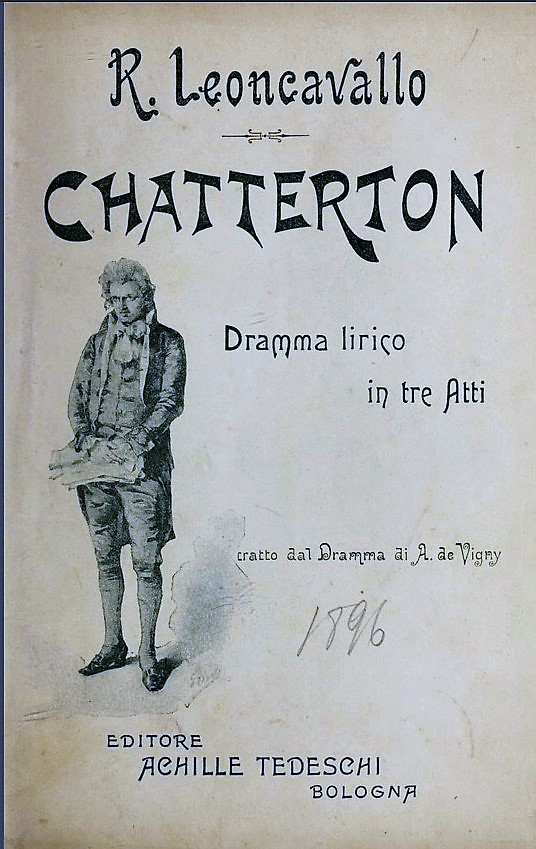
- Cover of the libretto published in 1896
- Librettist: Ruggero Leoncavallo
- Premiere: 10 March 1896; Teatro Drammatico Nazionale, Rome

Chatterton is a dramma lirico or opera in three acts (four acts in its original 1876 version) by Ruggero Leoncavallo. The libretto was written by the composer himself and is freely adapted from the life of the young English poet from Bristol, Thomas Chatterton (1752–1770). Although composed in 1876, it premiered 20 years later on 10 March 1896, at the Teatro Drammatico Nazionale in Rome.

== Background and performance history ==
Considered by the romantics as the perfect archetype of the accursed poet, Chatterton became famous for his brilliant pastiches of medieval poetry, which he attributed to an imaginary 15th-century monk whom he called Thomas Rowley. At the age of 18, to escape his misery, he committed suicide in London by taking poison.

The plot of the opera is based on Alfred de Vigny's Chatterton (published in 1835)—a successful drama in three acts derived from the second of the trio of short stories contained in his philosophical novel Stello (1832).

Chatterton, composed in 1876, is the debut opera of a young Leoncavallo freshly graduated from the Naples conservatory. However, the composer failed in his attempt to get his work performed because the promoter of the planned production disappeared with Leoncavallo's money shortly before the premiere. Leoncavallo would have to wait until after the financial success of his best known opera, 1892's Pagliacci, to see Chatterton produced.

The opera finally premiered on 10 March 1896, at the Teatro Drammatico Nazionale, Rome, in a revised version of the original four-act opera. The work was not successful even after another revision which was completed in 1905. Today, Chatterton is rarely performed.

== Roles ==
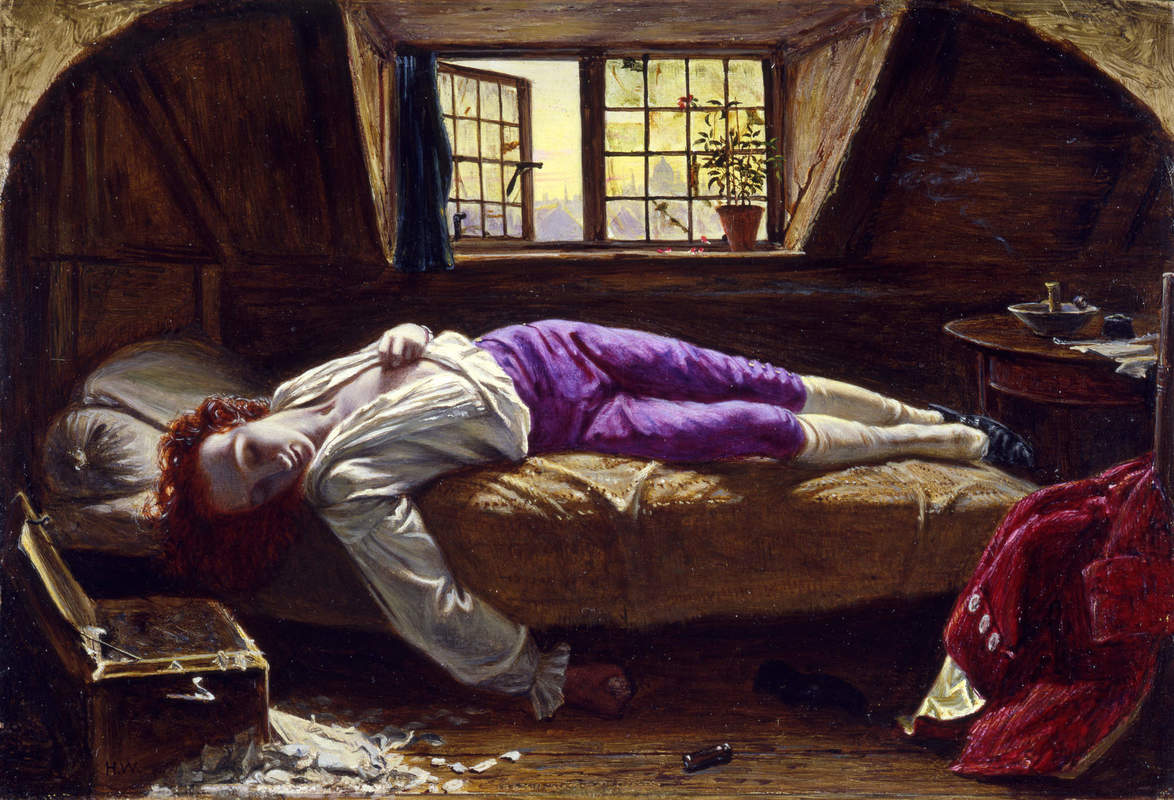
The central character of the opera is the English genius Thomas Chatterton, author of poems published under the name of Thomas Rowley, and who eventually commits suicide.

Role	Voice type	Premiere Cast, March 10, 1896 (Conductor: Vittorio Podesti)
Thomas Chatterton	tenor	Benedetto Lucignani
Jenny Clark	soprano	Adalgisa Gabbi
John Clark	bass	Raffaele Terzi
Giorgio	baritone	Giuseppe Cremona
Skirner	tenor	Aristide Anceschi
Lord Klifford	baritone	
Young Henry	soprano	Cremona

== Synopsis ==
Chatterton lives as a lodger in a wealthy home. Unable to live by his writing, he has to look for a job to support himself. Unfortunately, he can only get a job as a servant. The other aspect of the situation is his thwarted and concealed love for Jenny Clark (Kitty Bell in Vigny's play), the wife of the industrialist who is his landlord. Finally, faced with an impossible love and a menial job, a despairing Chatterton kills himself. He is followed immediately in death by Jenny.

== Recordings ==
- Chatterton is notable for being one of the first complete operas ever recorded (in May 1908, by His Master's Voice's predecessor the Gramophone Company on multiple 78-rpm discs). The fact that this recording was conducted by the composer himself makes it an outstandingly valuable acoustic document. It has been skilfully restored by the American audio engineer Ward Marston and distributed on CD by his label, Marston Records (52016-2). The orchestral playing under Leoncavallo's direction is unpolished and the quality of the cast of singers uneven, with by far the best contribution coming from a renowned La Scala dramatic tenor of the era, Francesco Signorini, who delivers his allotted music (he shares the title role with another tenor, Francisco Granados) with a fine voice and real dramatic conviction. (The 1908 Chatterton is coupled on the Marston reissue with a 1907 recording of Pagliacci in its entirety, featuring a mostly different cast.)
- Another complete recording of the work exists, released by the label Bongiovanni with the following cast: Renato Zuin, Tiziana Scaciga della Silva, Maurizio Zanchetti, Enrica Bassano, Fabrizio Neri – Orchestra dell’Opera Ucraina di Dniepropetrovsk, Coro Filarmonico di Pesaro – Silvano Frontalini
