= Magda Olivero =

Italian operatic soprano (1910–2014)

- Olivero (1952 dedication)
- Born: Maria Maddalena Olivero; 25 March 1910; Saluzzo, Italy
- Died: 8 September 2014 (aged 104); Milan, Italy
- Occupation: Operatic soprano

Magda Olivero (née Maria Maddalena Olivero; 25 March 1910 – 8 September 2014) was an Italian operatic soprano. Her career started in 1932 when she was 22, and spanned five decades, establishing her "as an important link between the era of the verismo composers and the modern opera stage". She has been regarded as "one of the greatest singers of the twentieth century".

== Life and career ==
Born as Maria Maddalena Olivero in Saluzzo, Italy, she followed complete musical studies (piano, harmony and composition), graduating in piano at the Giuseppe Verdi Conservatory in Turin. She later studied singing outside the Conservatory and made her singing debut in 1932 on radio performing Nino Cattozzo's oratorio, I Misteri Dolorosi.

Olivero performed widely and increasingly successfully until 1941, when she married the industrialist Aldo Busch and retired from the stage, only taking part in sporadic charity events for almost a decade. Not having had children as she would have liked to, however, she resumed her career in 1951, at the request of Francesco Cilea, who asked her to sing the title role again in his opera Adriana Lecouvreur. She performed this role at the Teatro Grande in Brescia on 3 February of that year, but Cilea did not see his wish come true as he had died less than three months earlier.

From 1951 until her final retirement, Olivero appeared in opera houses throughout Italy and, mainly in the 1960s and 1970s, all around the world (Europe, Egypt, the U.S., and Latin America), but never in such premier venues as the Royal Opera House or the Paris Opera. Olivero performed just once at the Vienna State Opera, and exceedingly rarely at La Scala. Throughout the second part of her career she appeared at La Scala only 20 times overall, in just three productions. Among her most renowned interpretations were those of the leading roles in Adriana Lecouvreur, Iris, Fedora, Tosca, La Bohème, La Fanciulla del West, La Traviata, La Wally, Madama Butterfly, Manon Lescaut, Mefistofele, Turandot (as Liù) and La Voix humaine, the Italian version of which she premiered in Trieste in 1968.

She debuted successfully in the United States in 1967 as Medea in the Italian version of Cherubini's Médée, at the Dallas Opera, where she subsequently appeared in 1969 as Fedora, in 1970 as Giorgetta in Il Tabarro and in a gala concert featuring Poulenc's La voix humaine, sung for the first time in French; and finally as Tosca in 1974. The role of Medea, belonging to an eighteenth-century repertoire that was quite alien to her ordinary interests, was again taken at the Music Hall Theater in Kansas City in 1968, as well as, three years later, at Amsterdam's Concertgebouw, in concert, and eventually at Mantua's Teatro Sociale.

In 1975, at the age of 65, Olivero made her debut at the Metropolitan Opera in Tosca, "as a late replacement for Birgit Nilsson". Her only three performances caused a furore, being met with wild applause from audiences, and were later referred to as "legendary". Her farewell to the Met's public is narrated in these words in a recent history of the New York theatre:

On April 18, her third and last Met performance (she sang Tosca on tour in 1979), Olivero acknowledged the insistent cheers of the throng pressing forward on the orchestra floor by edging along the narrow lip at the base of the proscenium to touch the outstretched hands of her admirers. A misstep would have plunged her into the pit. With this gesture, Olivero showed what made her unique: she sang and acted as if her life depended on it.

— Charles and Mirella Jona Affron (2014), Grand Opera: The Story of the Met, p. 266.

Her last performances on stage were in March 1981, in the one-woman opera La Voix humaine, in Verona; her stage career ended at age 71, after spanning nearly 50 years. She continued to sing sacred music locally and made occasional singing appearances well into her nineties. Her last public recital was in Milan on 5 November 1991 at the Franciscan Centro Culturale Artistico Rosetum: many of her contemporary artists were in the audience, including her friend Renata Tebaldi, who was heard murmuring after the recital: "It's a great lesson in singing".

Olivero died at the Istituto Auxologico di Milano aged 104. Olivero attributed her longevity to her vegetarian diet and practicing yoga.

She is buried in the Famedio, the famous people's memorial chapel, of the Monumental Cemetery of Milan.

== Recordings and appraisal ==
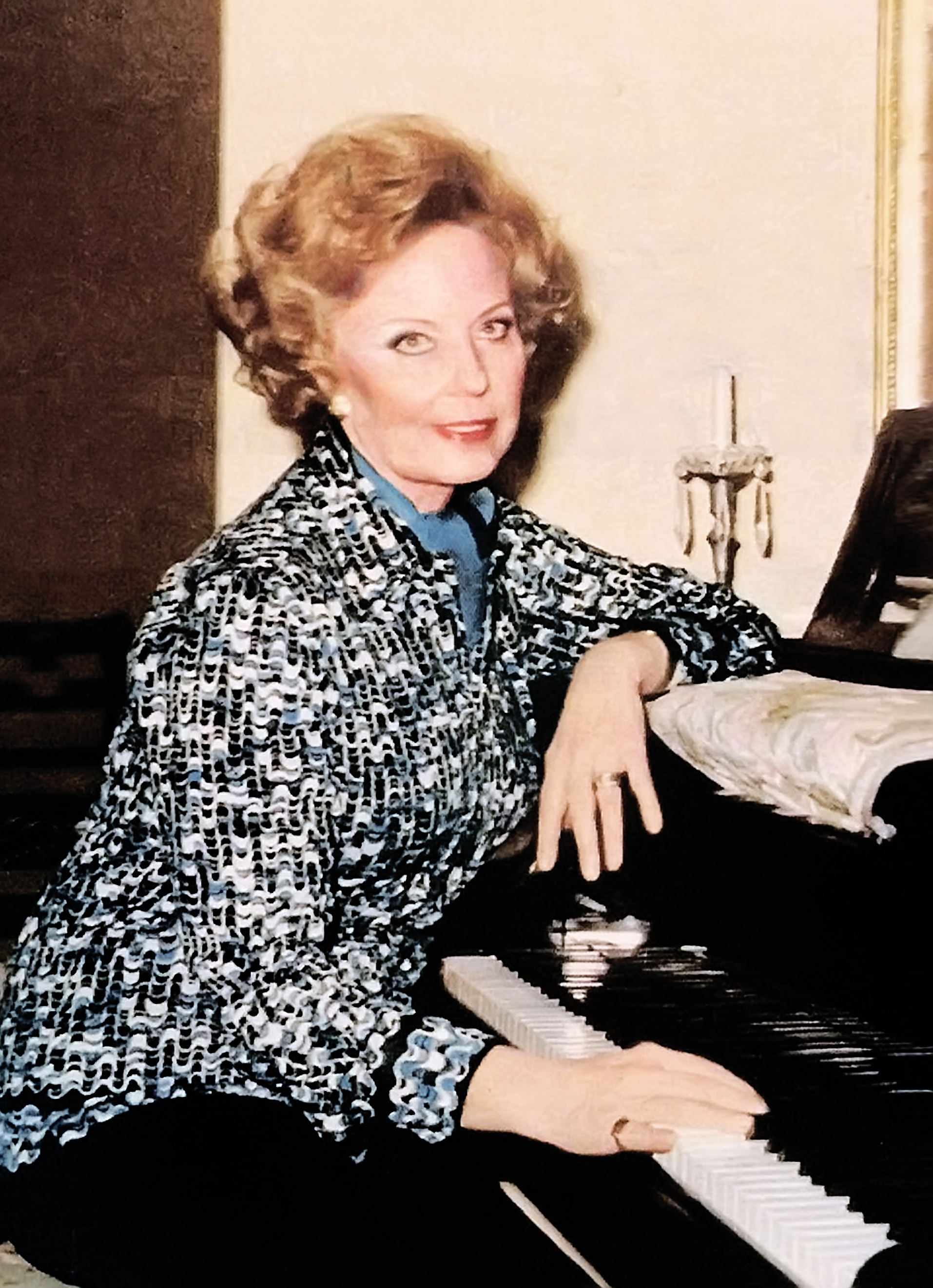
Magda Olivero in 1972

Despite having a large cult following, Magda Olivero was never at the centre of the operatic star system, being largely restricted to Italian provincial theatres, and she was almost completely ignored by the official record industry. There exist only two studio recordings of complete operas featuring Olivero: Turandot (as Liù, with Gina Cigna, for Cetra Records, 1938) and Fedora (with Mario Del Monaco and Tito Gobbi, conducted by Lamberto Gardelli, for Decca, 1969). There exists a film, too, drawn from a 1960 RAI-television broadcast of Tosca.

Studio recordings of individual pieces are also rare. Between 1939 and 1953 Olivero was called upon by Cetra to record arias by Puccini, Cilea, Boito, Verdi and others, including the finale of Act 1 of La Traviata, which Rodolfo Celletti described as "the most fascinating performance of this scene and aria ever committed to the phonograph." Apart from these pieces, there are only two other official records: a sacred music recital entitled Quando il Canto Diventa Preghiera, performed at the Angelicum Theatre in Milan (Ariston Records, no longer available at present), and the highlights from Francesca da Rimini (with Del Monaco, conducted by Nicola Rescigno, for Decca, 1969).

In 1993, when her stage career had been over for many years, Olivero recorded, with piano accompaniment, Adriana Lecouvreur (with Marta Moretto as the Princesse de Bouillon): excerpts from this recording were published on the Bongiovanni label. At age 86, she performed Adriana's monologue in Jan Schmidt-Garre's film Opera Fanatic.

Despite scant interest shown by the official record industry, live recordings exist of many of her performances that are fully able to document her artistic skills. In 1996, Canadian Fan Club label released an anthology CD entitled Magda Olivero in concert. 1962 - 1972. Concertgebouw Amsterdam. It was intended to be the first of a collection of live recordings owned by Olivero herself and her collaborator Denis Robert, who also edited the release. However, the new situation of music publishing in the Internet age led Robert not to proceed beyond the first CD and instead to transfer the entire collection to a YouTube channel under his direction, The Magda Olivero Archives, which features over one hundred videos, accompanied by photos of the singer.

The extent of Olivero's ability was identified by her great admirer Marilyn Horne, who, in 1975, fervently insisted that the Met finally engage Olivero: "She practically gave acting and singing lessons while onstage; honestly, you could learn more from watching an Olivero performance than from reading most books on those very subjects."

Stefan Zucker, the interviewer of the old divas starring in the aforementioned film Opera Fanatic, summarizes his opinion on Olivero in these words.

Olivero was coached by Cilea and a number of now-obscure verismo composers and is the last singer with such a background. For me, she distills and exemplifies the tradition. From Gemma Bellincioni to Lina Bruna Rasa, the verismo era was transfigured by searing vocal actresses. Unlike Olivero, few also were consummate musicians able through rubato (lengthening or shortening notes or groups of notes) to convey the music's tension and repose. More, hers is "il cantar che nell'anima si sente"—singing that is sensed in the soul. Her London/Decca Fedora, made in 1968, is the last emotionally important commercial recording of an Italian opera.

Zucker also adds that "Olivero's reviews in Italy always were laudatory", whereas in America "critics such as Alan Rich and Barton Wimble wrote of her with derision, regarding her vocalism as like Florence Foster Jenkins's, her style as exaggerated and campy." Yet, in Italy, too detractors have not been lacking. In his praised book L'opera in CD, critic Elvio Giudici manifests his general dislike for both Olivero's dated and affected style, and her mediocre voice quality throughout her career. He also admits, however, that an exceptional theatrical personality is evidenced by each of her recordings and that how to evaluate her performances is bound to remain open to debate, fundamentally depending on one's own subjective sensitivity.

On the occasion of her death, sympathetic obituaries appeared in the press around the world. In his TheaterJones article musician and critic Gregory Sullivan Isaacs reported the following opinion expressed by Emmanuel Villaume, the Dallas Opera's music director, as "one of the best summaries" of Olivero's artistry:

Magda Olivero was a unique artist. People generally praise her mostly for her dramatic stage presence. What always impressed me in her interpretations was the ability, beyond her stagecraft, to use her God given natural voice and unsurpassed technique, as well as superior and cultured musicianship, to put all these components at the service of a controlled and unified performance.
Drama, magic and music just fed each other perfectly.

== Bibliography ==
- Magda Olivero, foreword, in Dryden, Konrad (2009). Franco Alfano, Transcending Turandot Scarecrow Press Inc. ISBN 978-0810869776
- Dryden, Konrad, From Another World: The Art of Magda Olivero, "The Opera Quarterly", vol. 20 number 3, Summer 2004
- Hastings, Stephen, "Verismo Muse", Opera News, Vol. 70, No. 7, January 2006. (accessed via subscription 28 March 2010)
- Quattrocchi, Vincenzo (1984). Magda Olivero: Una voce per tre generazioni, Turin, Italgrafica, 1984
- Quattrocchi, Vincenzo (2006). Magda Olivero: I miei personaggi. Parma. Azzali. ISBN 88-8825-232-0
- Robert, Denis (1 September 2017). "Magda Olivero: Legendary Soprano - Part I". myScena. Montreal: La Scena Musicale.
- Robert, Denis (11 October 2017). "Magda Olivero – La Verissima – Part II". myScena. Montreal: La Scena Musicale.
- Stinchelli, Enrico (2002). "L'art n'a pas d'âge: Magda Olivero". Les stars de l'opéra: Grands artistes lyriques de l'histoire de l'opéra (in French). Gremese. pp. 80–81. ISBN 88-7301-499-2.
