= Marta Moretto =

Italian mezzo-soprano

Marta Moretto is an Italian operatic lyric mezzo-soprano, who was born in Padua.

A graduate of the Conservatorio "Cesare Pollini," in her native city, Moretto made her formal debut in 1990, as Maddalena in Rigoletto, in Mexico City. She has appeared in Berlin (Verdi Requiem, 1990), Lucca (Santuzza in Cavalleria rusticana, and Suzuki in Madama Butterfly, 1991), Venice (in Busoni's Turandot, directed by Achim Freyer, 1994, and the Zia Principessa in Suor Angelica, 1996), Savona (Azucena in Il trovatore, 1995), Rouen (Ulrica in Un ballo in maschera, 1996), Marseille and Lyon (Fenena in Nabucco, 1996), Parma (Ortrud in Lohengrin, 2000, and Rigoletto, 2001), and Messina (Leokadja Begbick in Aufstieg und Fall der Stadt Mahagonny, 2001).

In 2001, the Centennial of Giuseppe Verdi's death, Moretto sang Amneris, in Aïda, in Pavia, Pisa, Rovigo, and Trento. In 2003, her German debut took place in the title role of Bizet's Carmen, opposite the Don José of Fernando del Valle, in a production of the Loreley Klassik at the Balver Höhle. She has also sung in Seoul and Monte-Carlo. In Rome, in 2009, she was seen in Iphigénie en Aulide, conducted by Riccardo Muti, as well as in Pelléas et Mélisande (as Geneviève), which was produced by Pierre Audi.

In 1993, Moretto recorded the role of the Princesse de Bouillon, in Adriana Lecouvreur, opposite Magda Olivero in the name part. Excerpts from the recording were released on the Bongiovanni label.

== Sources ==
- Liner notes, Adriana Lecouvreur, Bongiovanni, 1993.
