= Ruggero Leoncavallo =

Italian composer (1857–1919)

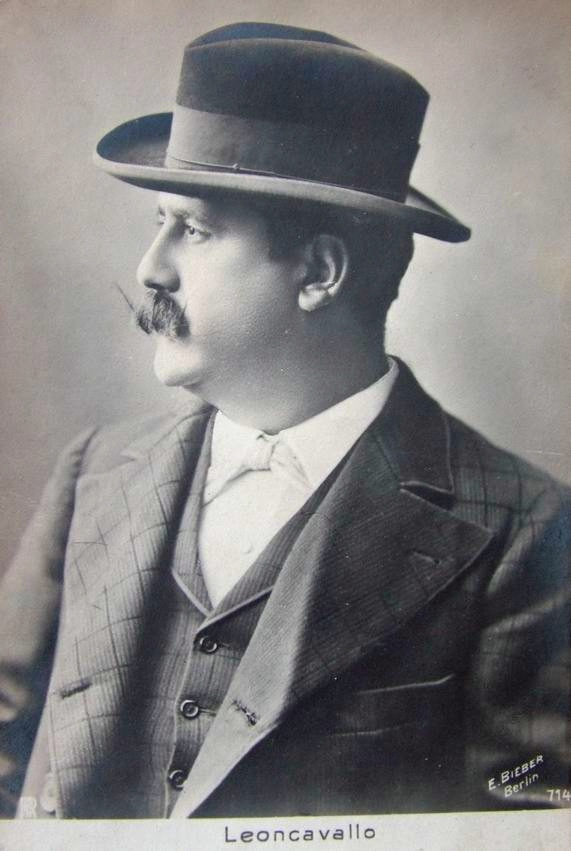
- Leoncavallo on a 1910 postcard
- Born: Ruggiero Giacomo Maria Giuseppe Emmanuele Raffaele Domenico Vincenzo Francesco Donato Leoncavallo; 23 April 1857; Naples, Kingdom of the Two Sicilies
- Died: 9 August 1919 (aged 62); Montecatini Terme, Kingdom of Italy
- Occupations: Opera composer; librettist
- Years active: 1879–1919

Ruggero (or Ruggiero) (Note: His first name is also spelled Ruggiero in many sources. His birth certificate lists his full name as Ruggiero Giacomo Maria Giuseppe Emmanuele Raffaele Domenico Vincenzo Francesco Donato Leoncavallo. However, his tombstone spells his first name as Ruggero.) Leoncavallo (Note: English pronunciation: UK: /ˌleɪɒnkæˈvæloʊ/ LAY-on-kav-AL-oh, US: /ˌleɪoʊnkəˈvɑːloʊ, -kɑːˈ-/ LAY-ohn-kə-VAH-loh, -kah-; Italian pronunciation: [rudˈdʒɛːro leˌoŋkaˈvallo].) (23 April 1857 – 9 August 1919) was an Italian opera composer and librettist. Throughout his career, Leoncavallo produced numerous operas and songs, but it is his 1892 opera Pagliacci that remained his lasting contribution, despite attempts to escape the shadow of his greatest success.

Today Pagliacci continues to be his most famous opera and one of the most popular and frequently performed works in the operatic repertoire. His other notable compositions include the song "Mattinata", popularized by Enrico Caruso, and, to a lesser extent, his version of La bohème which, however, was overshadowed by Puccini's highly successful opera of the same name.

== Biography ==
The son of Vincenzo Leoncavallo, a police magistrate and judge, Leoncavallo was born in Naples, at the time the capital of the Kingdom of the Two Sicilies, on 23 April 1857.

As a child, Leoncavallo moved with his father to the town of Montalto Uffugo in Calabria, where he lived during his adolescence. In 1868 he returned to Naples, where he eventually became a student at San Pietro a Majella Conservatory. From 1876 to 1877, he studied literature under the famed Italian poet Giosuè Carducci at the University of Bologna. He also lived in Potenza, from 1876 until 1878.

In 1879, Leoncavallo's uncle Giuseppe, director of the press department at the Foreign Ministry in Egypt, suggested that his young nephew come to Cairo to showcase his pianistic abilities. Ruggero Leoncavallo arrived in Egypt shortly after the Ottoman Sultan Abdul Hamid II had deposed Khedive Ismail (June 1879) and replaced him as Khedive of Egypt with Ismail's son Tewfik Pasha. Mahmud Hamdi Pasha (1863–1921), the teenage brother of the new Khedive, appointed Ruggero Leoncavallo as "his private musician". His time in Egypt concluded abruptly in mid-1882, as the British intervened in the Urabi revolt of 1879–1882 in Alexandria and Cairo led by Ahmed Urabi; the composer fled and travelled to France. In Paris, Leoncavallo found lodging in Montmartre.

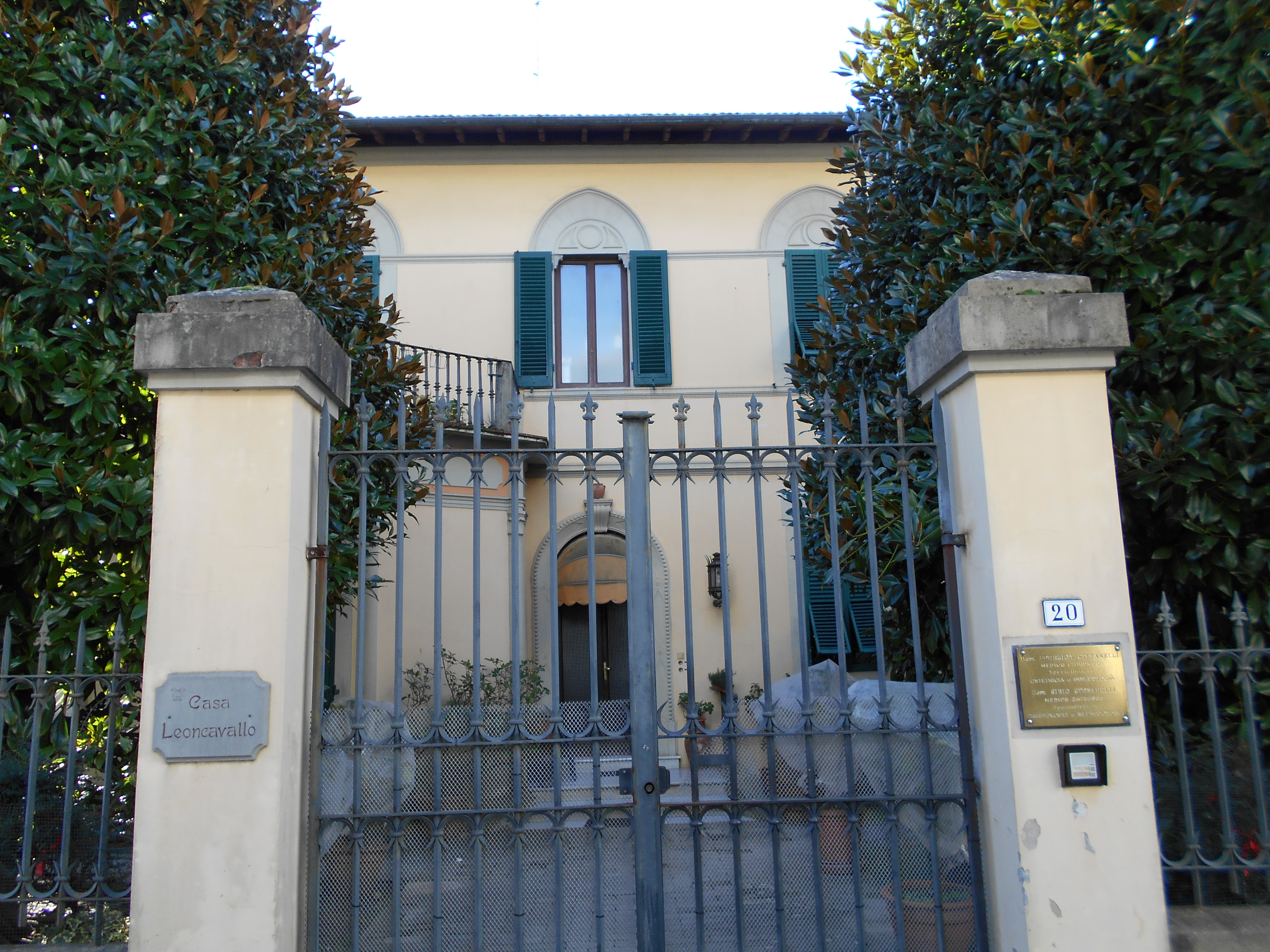
Leoncavallo's house at Montecatini Terme

An agent located in the Rue du Faubourg-Saint-Denis secured Leoncavallo employment as an accompanist and instructor for artists who performed in Sunday concerts mostly at cafés. In Paris, Leoncavallo met the singer Berthe Rambaud (1869–1926), who became his "preferred student"; they became partners in Paris in 1888 and married in Milan in 1895. Increasingly inspired by the French romantics, particularly Alfred de Musset, Leoncavallo began work on a symphonic poem based on Musset's poetry entitled La nuit de mai. The work was completed in Paris in 1886 and premiered in April 1887 to critical acclaim. With this success, and now with enough accumulated money, in 1888 Leoncavallo moved to Milan with Rambaud.

Back in Italy, Leoncavallo spent some years teaching and attempting ineffectively to obtain the production of more than one opera, notably Chatterton. In 1890 he saw the enormous success of Pietro Mascagni's Cavalleria rusticana and wasted no time in producing his own verismo work, Pagliacci. (According to Leoncavallo, the plot of this work had a real-life origin: he claimed it derived from a murder trial in Montalto Uffugo, over which his father had presided.)

Pagliacci was performed in Milan in 1892 with immediate success; today it is the only work by Leoncavallo in the standard operatic repertoire. Its most famous aria, "Vesti la giubba" ("Put on the costume" or, in the better-known older translation, "On with the motley"), was recorded by Enrico Caruso and laid claim to being the world's first record to sell a million copies (although this is probably a total of Caruso's various versions of it, made in 1902, 1904 and 1907).

The next year his I Medici was also produced in Milan, but neither it nor Chatterton (belatedly produced in 1896)—both early works—obtained much lasting favour. Much of Chatterton, however, was recorded by the Gramophone Company (later His Master's Voice) as early as 1908, and remastered on CD almost 100 years later by Marston Records. Leoncavallo himself conducts the performance or at very least supervises the production.

It was not until Leoncavallo's La bohème was performed in 1897 in Venice that his talent obtained public confirmation. However, this work was outshone by Puccini's opera of the same name and on the same subject, which had been premiered by the Teatro Regio in Turin in February 1896. Two tenor arias from Leoncavallo's version are still occasionally performed, especially in Italy.

Subsequent operas by Leoncavallo in the 1900s were: Zazà (the opera of Geraldine Farrar's famous 1922 farewell performance at the Metropolitan Opera), and 1904's Der Roland von Berlin. In 1906 the composer brought singers and orchestral musicians from La Scala to perform concerts of his music in New York, as well as making an extensive tour of the United States. The tour was, all in all, a qualified success. He had a brief success with Zingari, which premiered in Italian in London in 1912, with a long run at the Hippodrome Theatre. Zingari also reached the United States but soon disappeared from the repertoire.

After a series of operettas, Leoncavallo appeared to have tried for one last serious effort with Edipo re. It had always been assumed that Leoncavallo had finished the work but had died before he could finish the orchestration, which was completed by Giovanni Pennacchio. However, with the publication of Konrad Dryden's biography of Leoncavallo it was revealed that Leoncavallo may not have written the work at all (although it certainly contains themes by Leoncavallo). A review of Dryden's study notes: "That fine Edipo re ... was not even composed by [Leoncavallo]. His widow paid another composer to concoct a new opera using the music of Der Roland von Berlin. Dryden didn't find one reference to the opera in Leoncavallo's correspondence nor is there a single note by him to be found in the handwritten score." Pennacchio may either have concocted the opera or have had to do more to Leoncavallo's incomplete work to "fill in the gaps" using Leoncavallo's earlier music.

=== Death and legacy ===
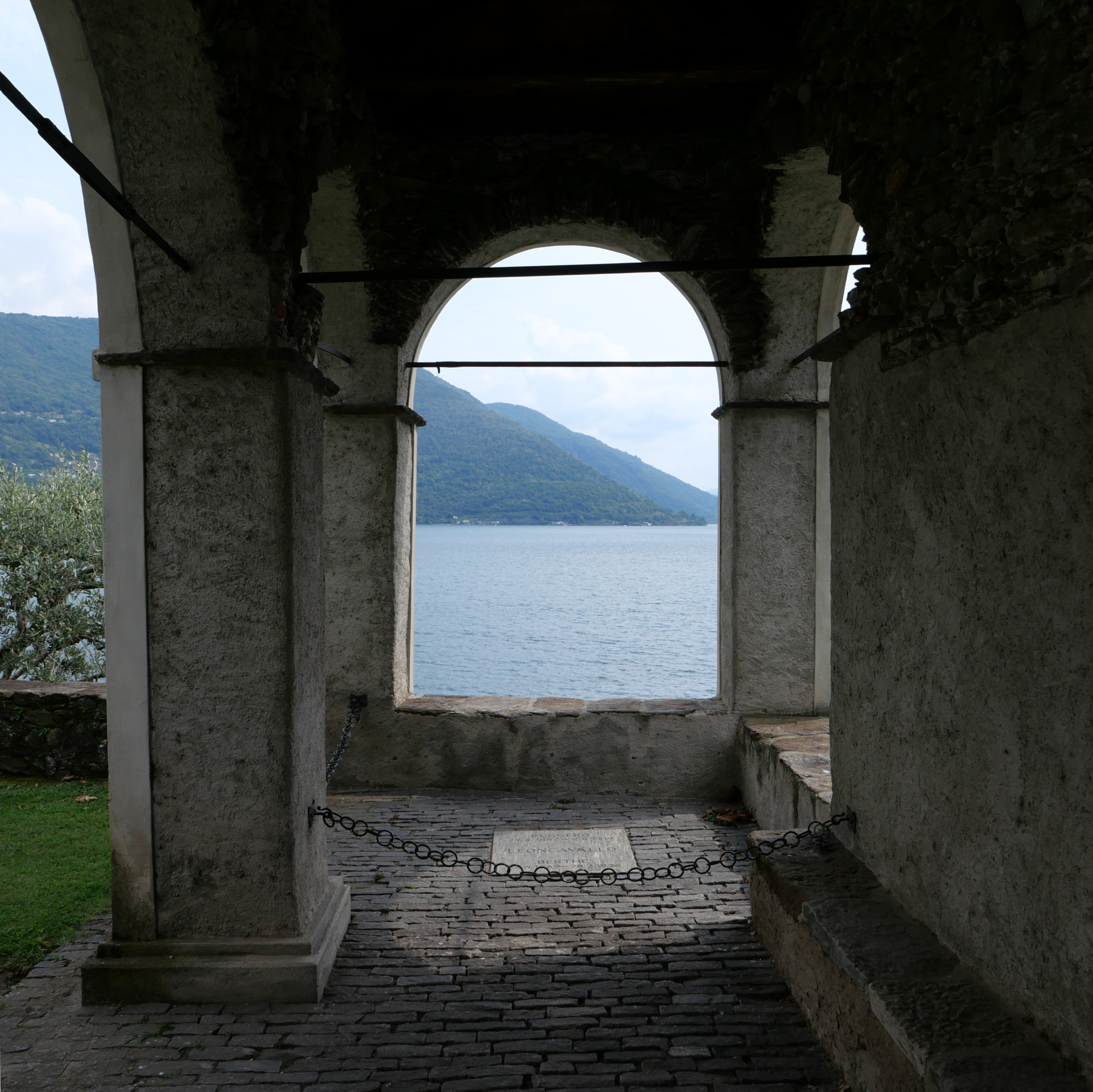
The grave at the Church of Madonna del Ponte with a view on Lake Maggiore.

Leoncavallo died in Montecatini Terme, Tuscany, on 9 August 1919. His funeral was held two days later, with hundreds in attendance, including fellow composer Pietro Mascagni and longtime rival Giacomo Puccini. He was buried in the Cimitero delle Porte Sante in Florence.

70 years after his death, a campaign was launched to move the composer's remains to Brissago, Switzerland, after an alleged letter written by Leoncavallo claimed to show he had desired to be buried there originally, although no such letter was ever found. Leoncavallo became an honorary citizen of Brissago and owned a lavish summer residence, Villa Myriam, in the town; in 1904 the composer had mentioned in a speech that he would not mind having a resting place in the town's Madonna di Porte cemetery, but it was never a written request in his will. Regardless, the campaign to move Leoncavallo's remains moved ahead and was granted official approval by Piera Leoncavallo-Grand, the last remaining descendant of the composer; Ruggero Leoncavallo's body was exhumed on 22 September 1989 for transfer to Switzerland. and burial there, alongside the remains of his wife Berthe (who had died in 1926).

The Museo Leoncavallo (Leoncavallo Museum) was established in 2002 in Brissago to commemorate the composer. It includes personal items and original manuscripts on display as well as statues representing characters from his operas Zazà and Der Roland von Berlin. The Museo Ruggiero Leoncavallo in the composer's childhood home of Montalto Uffugo was opened in 2010 and also contains various manuscripts and personal items, as well as Leoncavallo's personal piano.

Little from Leoncavallo's other operas is heard today, but the baritone arias from Zazà were great concert and recording favourites among baritones and Zazà as a whole is sometimes revived, as is his La bohème. The tenor arias from La bohème remain recording favourites.

Leoncavallo also composed songs, most famously "Mattinata", which he wrote for the Gramophone Company (which became His Master's Voice) with Caruso's unique voice in mind. On 8 April 1904, Leoncavallo accompanied Caruso at the piano as they recorded the song. On 8 December 1905, he recorded five of his own pieces for the reproducing piano Welte-Mignon.

Leoncavallo wrote the libretti for most of his own operas; after the death in 1918 of Arrigo Boito, some ranked Leoncavallo as the greatest librettist in Italy. His work for other composers included a contribution to the libretto for Puccini's 1893 work Manon Lescaut.

== Operas ==
"Vesti la giubba"

"No! Pagliaccio non son!"
Both from Pagliacci, performed by Enrico Caruso

- Pagliacci – 21 May 1892, Teatro Dal Verme, Milan.
- I Medici – 9 November 1893, Teatro Dal Verme, Milan). (The first part of the uncompleted trilogy, Crepusculum.)
- Chatterton – 10 March 1896, Teatro Argentina, Rome. (Revision of a work written in 1876.)
- La bohème – 6 May 1897, Teatro La Fenice, Venice.
- Zazà – 10 November 1900, Teatro Lirico, Milan.
- Der Roland von Berlin – 13 December 1904, Königliches Opernhaus, Berlin.
- Maïa – 15 January 1910, Teatro Costanzi, Rome.
- Zingari – 16 September 1912, Hippodrome, London.
- Mimi Pinson – 1913, Teatro Massimo, Palermo. (Revision of La bohème.)
- Mameli (about Goffredo Mameli) – 27 April 1916, Teatro Carlo Felice, Genoa. (Note that the Fondazione Leoncavallo classes this as an opera rather than an operetta.)
- Edipo re – 13 December 1920, Chicago Opera. (Produced after the composer's death, at very least orchestration not by Leoncavallo, completed or perhaps composed by Giovanni Pennacchio.)

== Operettas ==
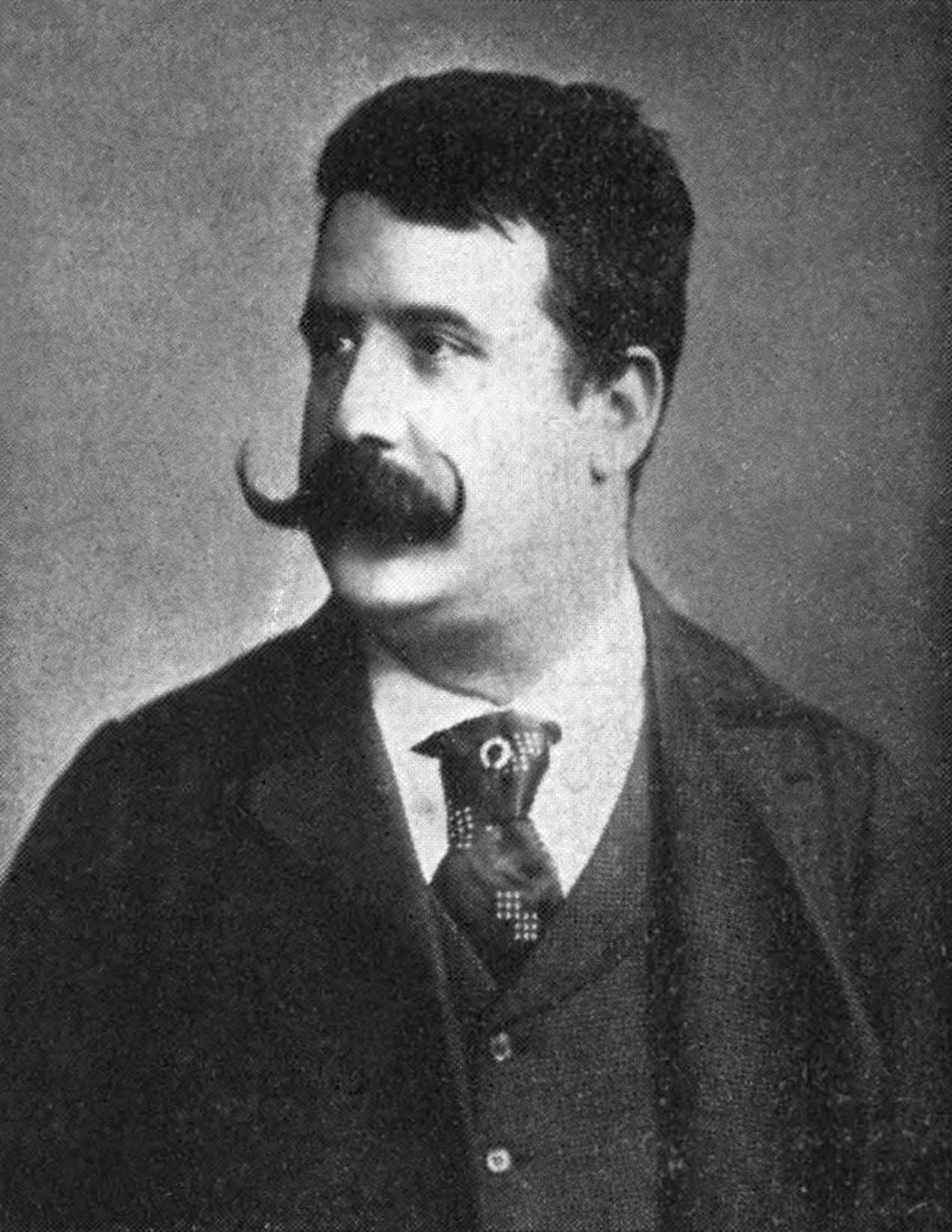
Ruggero Leoncavallo

- La jeunesse de Figaro – 1906, New York.
- Malbrouck – 19 January 1910, Teatro Nazionale, Rome.
- La reginetta delle rose – 24 June 1912, Teatro Costanzi, Rome.
- Are You There? – 1 November 1913, Prince of Wales Theatre, London.
- La candidata – 6 February 1915, Teatro Nazionale, Rome.
- Prestami tua moglie – 2 September 1916, Casino delle Terme, Montecatini. (English title: Lend me your wife.)
- Goffredo Mameli – 27 April 1916, Teatro Carlo Felice, Genoa.
- A chi la giarrettiera? – 16 October 1919, Teatro Adriano, Rome. (English title: Whose Garter Is This?) Produced after the composer's death.
- Il primo bacio – 29 April 1923 Salone di cura, Montecatini. Produced after the composer's death.
- La maschera nuda – 26 June 1925 Teatro Politeama, Naples. Produced after the composer's death.

== Other works ==
- La nuit de mai – poème symphonique for tenor and orchestra after Alfred de Musset, Paris 1886 (also performed and recorded in 1990 and – with Plácido Domingo – in 2010)
- Séraphitus Séraphita – Poema Sinfonico after Honoré de Balzac, Teatro alla Scala, Milan 1894

== Notes and references ==
Notes

=== Sources ===
- Dryden, Konrad (2007). Leoncavallo: Life and Works. Lanham, Maryland: Scarecrow Press. ISBN 9781461716655.
- "Ruggero Leoncavallo (1857–1919)". Mahler Foundation. 6 January 2015. Archived from the original on 13 November 2022.
- Sadie, Stanley; Bashford, Christina, eds. (1992). "Leoncavallo, Ruggero [Ruggiero]". The New Grove Dictionary of Opera. Macmillan. pp. 1148–1149. ISBN 0-935859-92-6.
