= Der Roland von Berlin (opera) =

Opera by Ruggero Leoncavallo

- Opera by Ruggero Leoncavallo
- Librettist: Leoncavallo
- Language: German
- Based on: Der Roland von Berlin by Willibald Alexis
- Premiere: 13 November 1904; Berlin State Opera

Der Roland von Berlin is an opera in four acts by composer Ruggero Leoncavallo. The work uses a German-language libretto by Leoncavallo which is based on Willibald Alexis's 1840 historical novel of the same name. The opera premiered at the Königliches Opernhaus in Berlin on 13 December 1904. Its premiere in Italy was given at the Teatro di San Carlo in Naples the following month where it was sung in Italian with the title Rolando.
