= National Dramatic Theatre =

Former theatre in Rome, Italy

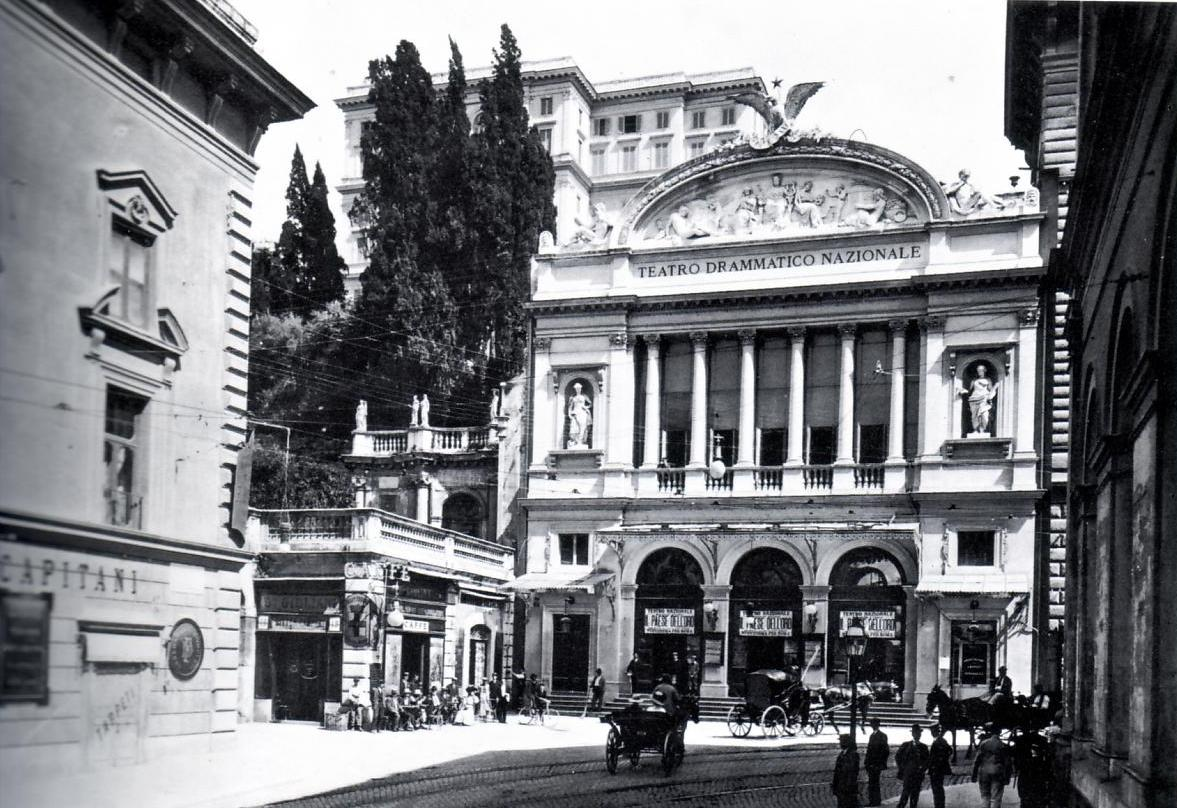
An Image of National Dramatic Theatre

The National Dramatic Theatre or National Theatre was a theatre in Rome, now demolished to build Via Nazionale.

== Bibliography ==
- Stefania Severi I teatri di Roma, Roma, Newton & Compton, 1989.
