= Carro di Tespi =

Italian theatrical company

The Carro di Tespi lirico was a travelling Italian theatrical company that was formerly supported by the Fascist regime. It was started in 1930 to bring opera to the masses. Three companies of Carro di Tespi drammatico, started in 1929 for non-operatic stage works, also existed.

The Carro di Tespi lirico brought opera to many Italian cities that did not have regular opera seasons, as well as some that did. It normally toured in July, August and September to about forty locations with two or three operas. Troupes occasionally would perform directly from the back of their traveling trucks or wagons. They also performed throughout Europe.

The staging of La Bohème, on an open-air stage in front of the Villa Puccini in the summer of 1930 marked the inauguration of the modern Carro di Tespi. The company returned to Torre del Lago in 1931 with Madama Butterfly and La Bohème. During the remainder of the 1930s, only one season was presented, in 1937, featuring last century's arguably most famous Puccinian heroine, Licia Albanese.

Many well known names in Italian theater and opera got there start in the Carro di Tespi. In modern-day Italy the Teatro Popolare Itinerante is a newer edition of this as is the annual Puccini Festival.

== See also ==
- Commedia dell'arte
