= Monza =

City in Lombardy, Italy

Monza Monscia (Lombard)
- Comune
- Comune di Monza
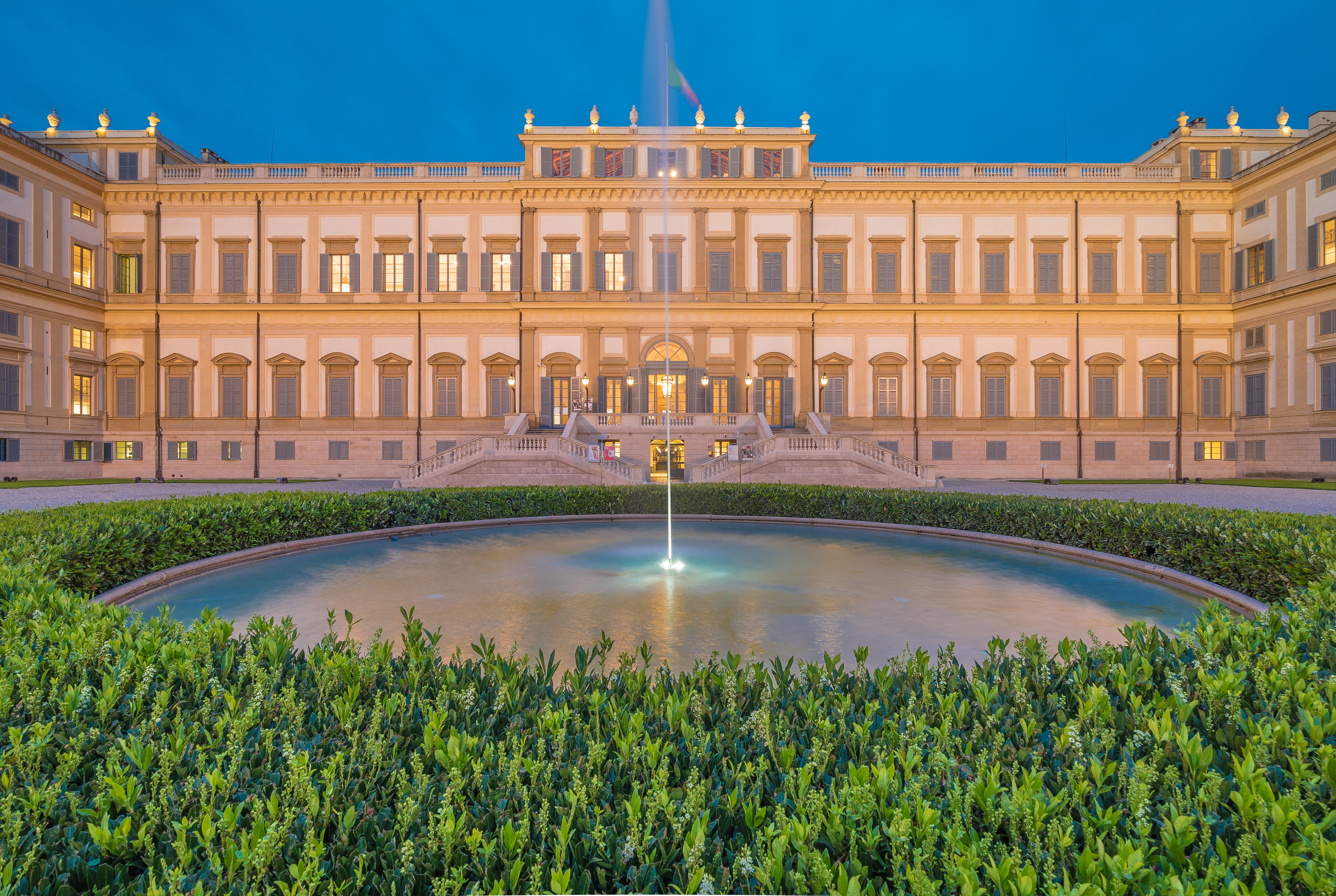
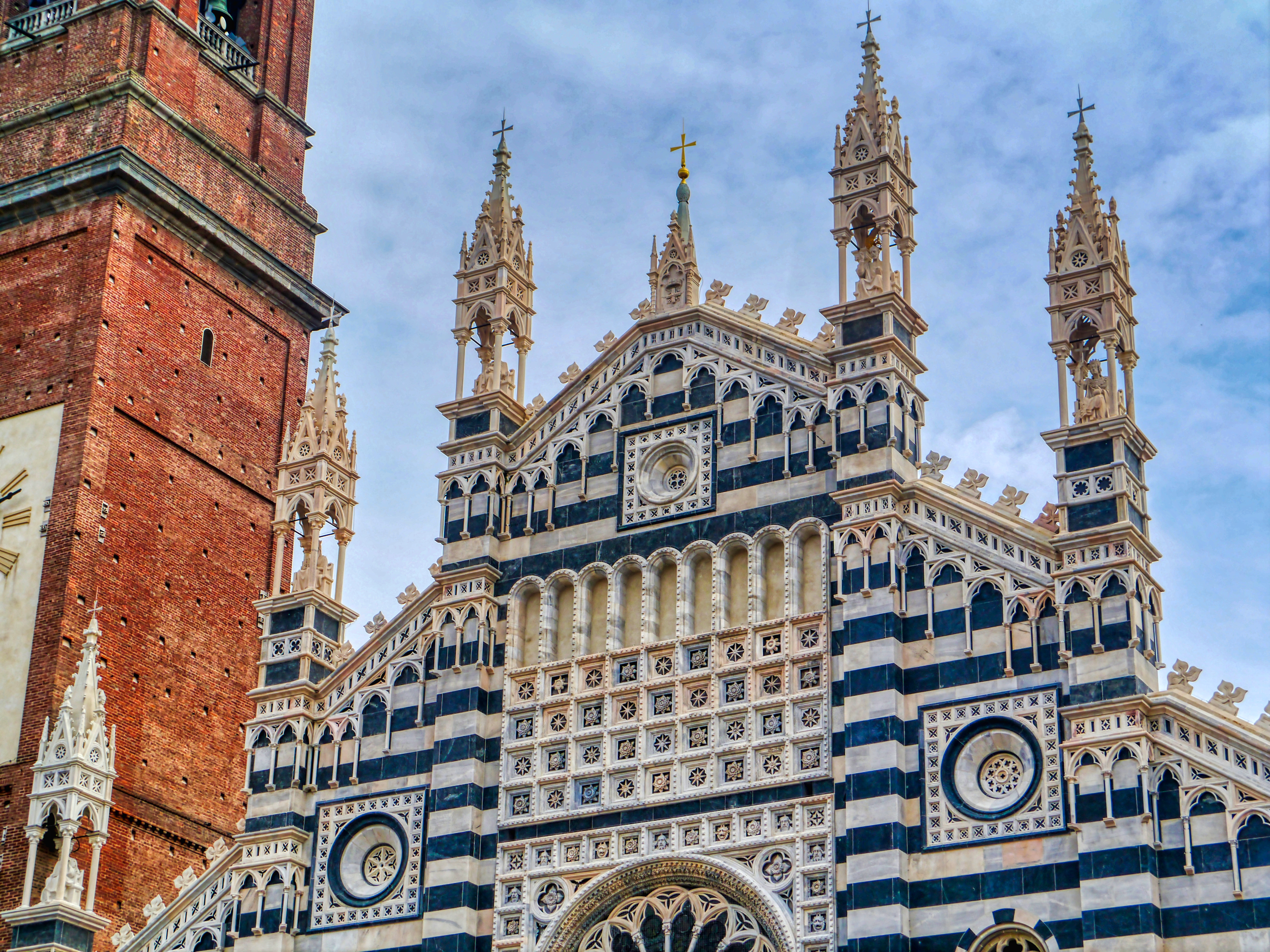
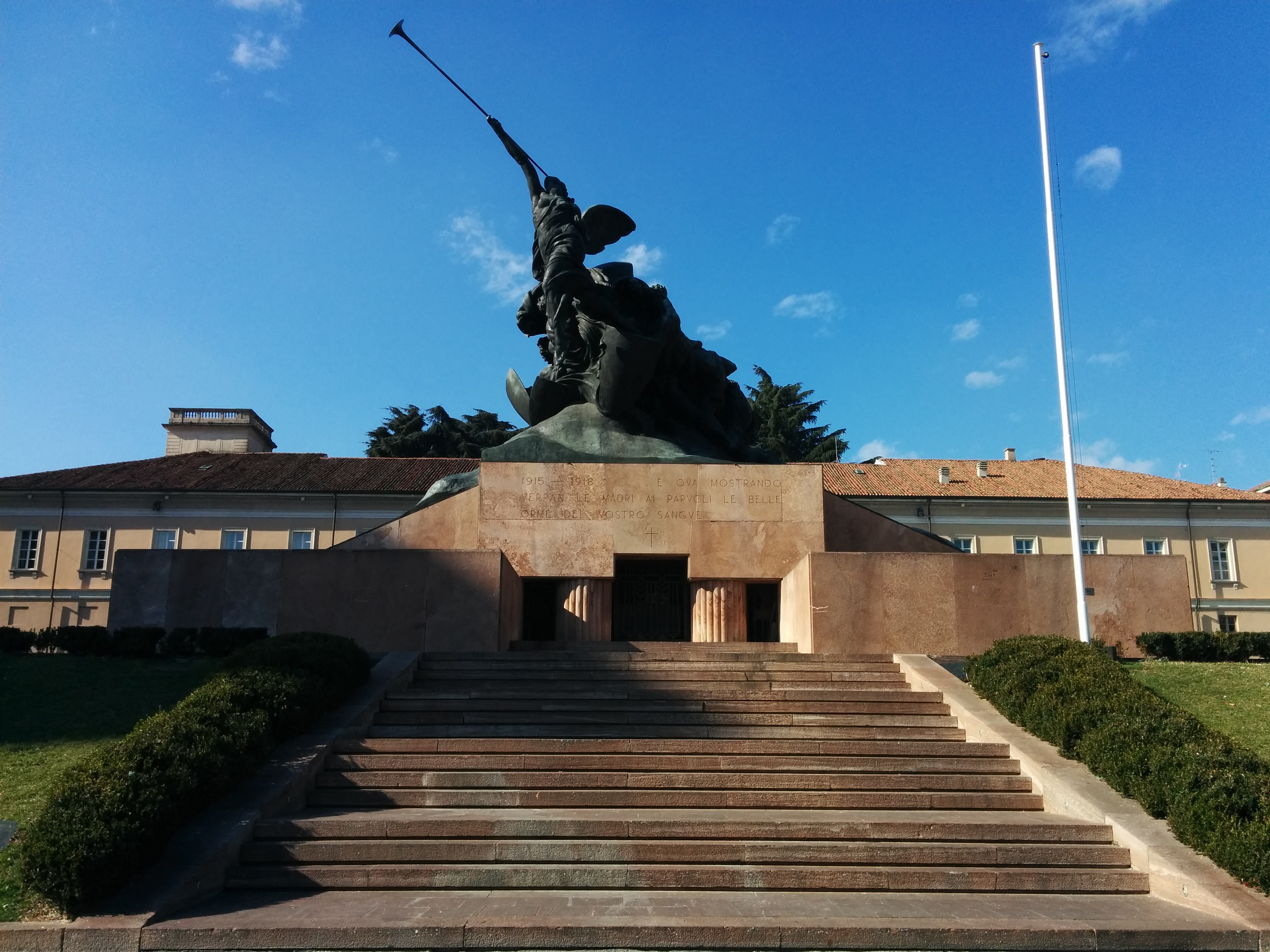
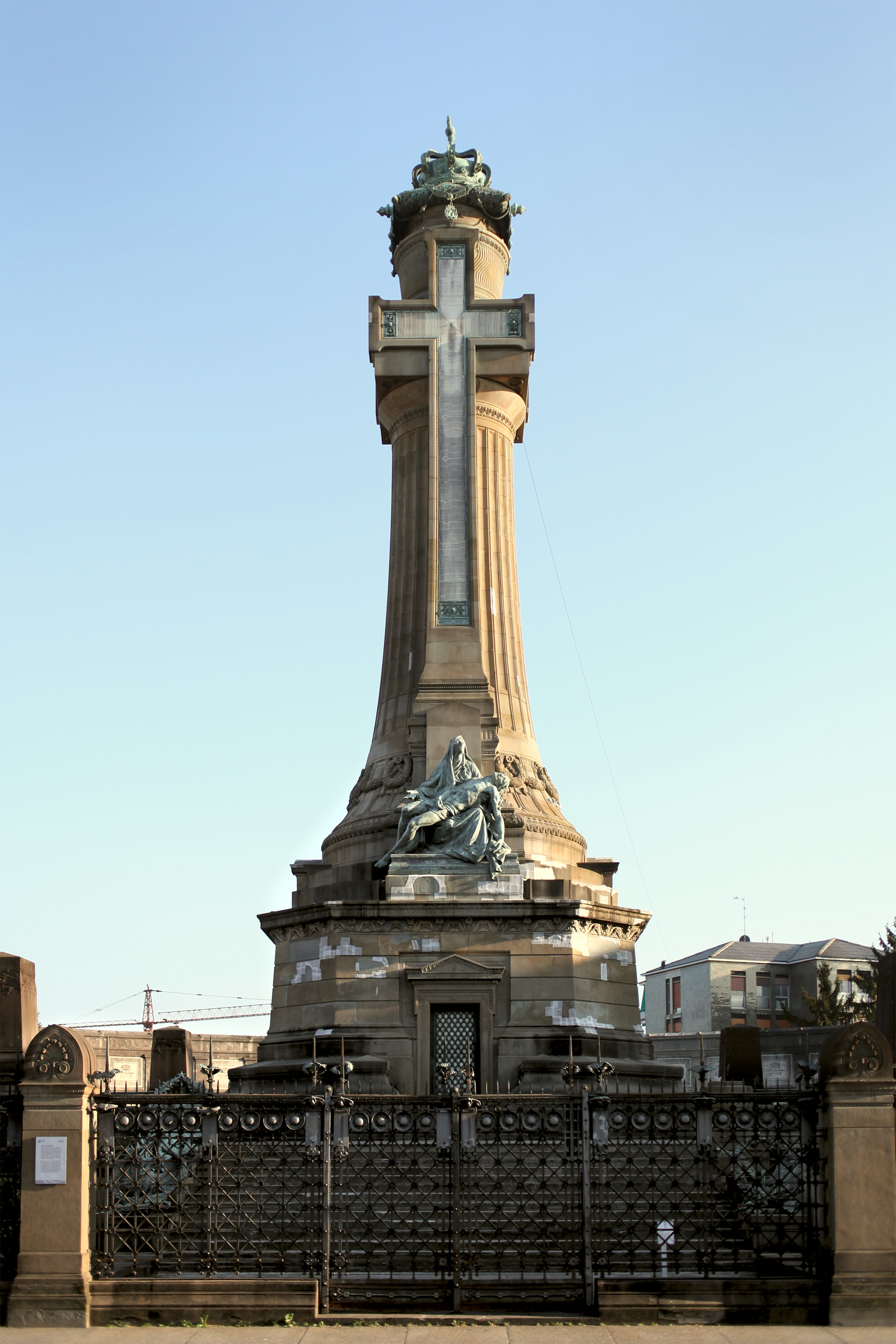
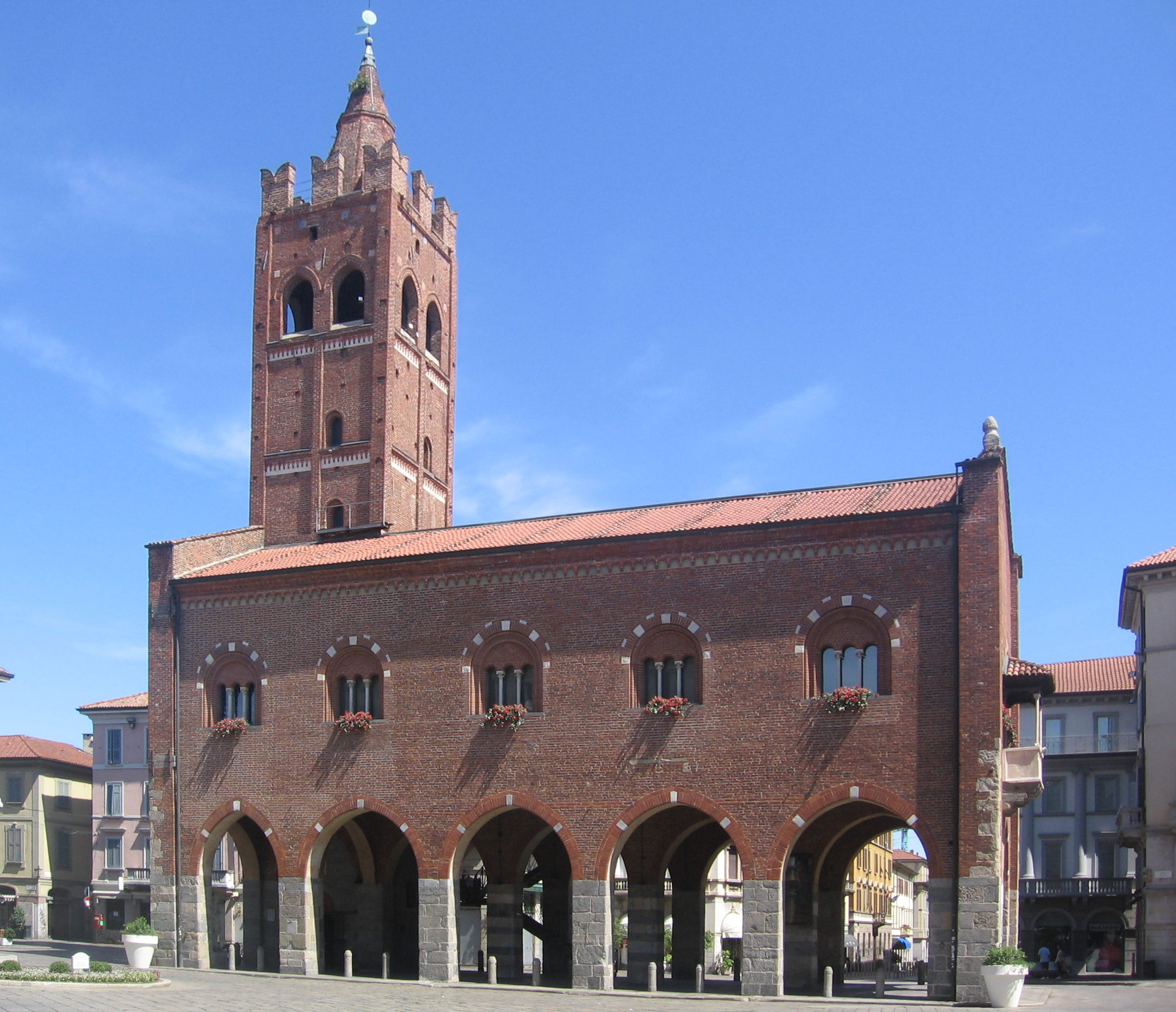
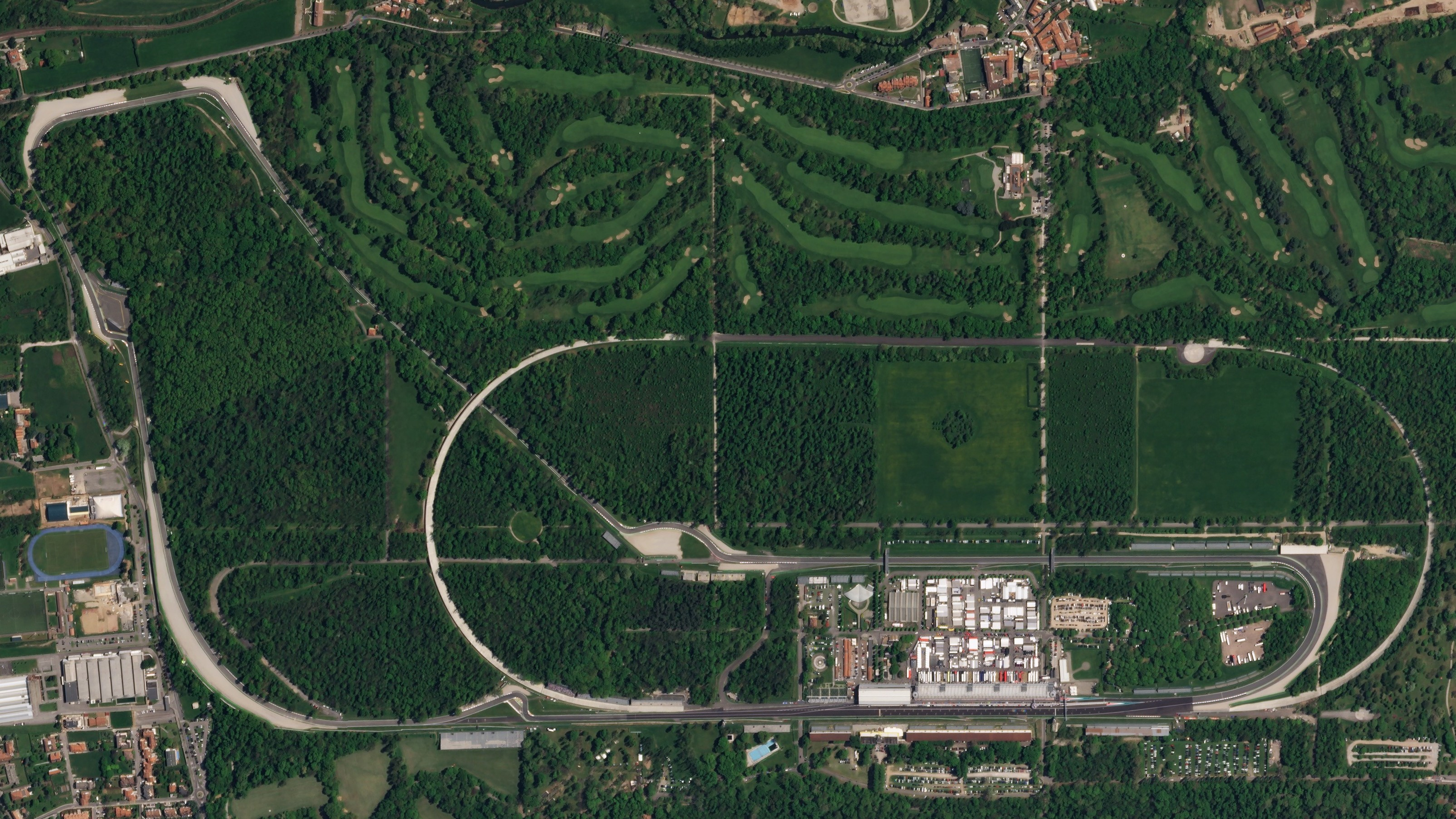
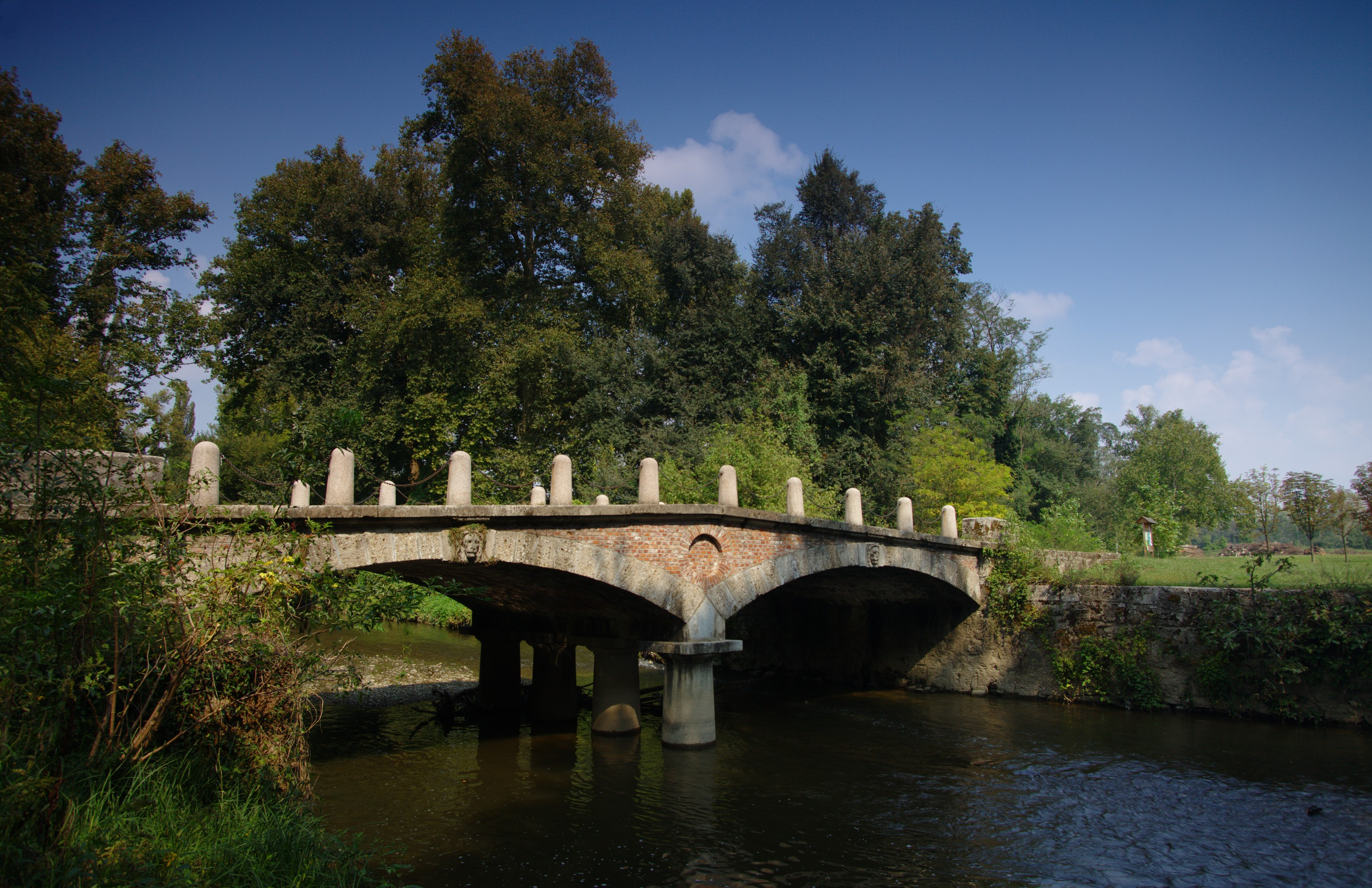
- From top, left to right: Royal Villa of Monza; Monza Cathedral; Monumento ai Caduti; Expiatory Chapel; Arengario; Monza Circuit; Monza Park

- Flag Coat of arms

- Location within Italy Location within Lombardy
- Coordinates: 45°35′01″N 09°16′25″E
- Country: Italy
- Region: Lombardy
- Province: Monza and Brianza (MB)

Government
  - Mayor: Paolo Pilotto (PD)

Area
  - Total: 33.09 km^{2} (12.78 sq mi)
- Elevation: 162 m (531 ft)

Population (2026)
  - Total: 123,672
  - Density: 3,737/km^{2} (9,680/sq mi)
- Demonym: Monzesi
- Time zone: UTC+1 (CET)
  - Summer (DST): UTC+2 (CEST)
- Postal code: 20900
- Dialing code: 039
- Patron saint: John the Baptist; Gerardo dei Tintori
- Saint day: 24 June; 6 June
- Website: Official website

Monza (English: /ˈmɒnzə/ MON-zə; Italian: [ˈmontsa]; Monzese: Monscia [ˈmũːʃa]; Latin: Modoetia) is a city and comune (municipality) in the region of Lombardy in northern Italy. Situated on the Lambro river about 15 kilometres (9.3 mi) north-northeast of Milan, it is the capital of the Province of Monza and Brianza and the largest city in the Brianza area, forming a part of the Milan metropolitan area. With a population of 123,672, it is the third-largest city in Lombardy.

Originally a Roman settlement, Monza became an important political and religious centre during the Lombard period, particularly under Queen Theodelinda, who established a royal residence and founded the early basilica from which the present Monza Cathedral developed. The cathedral houses the Iron Crown of Lombardy, a medieval relic traditionally associated with the coronation of the Kings of Italy, including Charlemagne and later sovereigns of the Kingdom of Italy.

Monza is internationally known for the Monza Circuit, one of the world's oldest permanent motor racing circuits and the long-standing host of the Italian Grand Prix. The city is also home to the Royal Villa of Monza and the adjoining Monza Park, one of the largest enclosed urban parks in Europe.

== Etymology ==
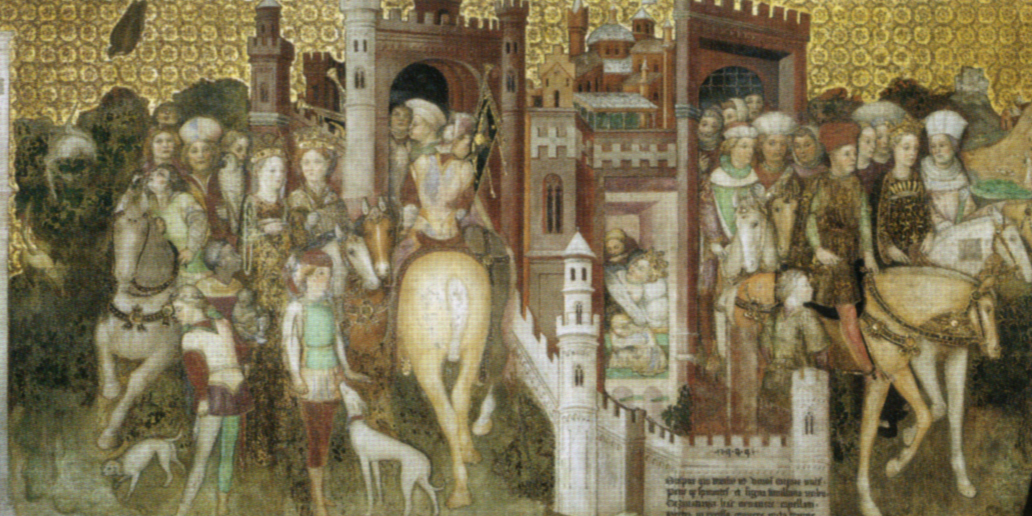
The Dream of Theodelinda, from the fresco cycle in the Cathedral

The origin of the name Monza is traditionally linked to a well-known legend associated with Queen Theodelinda, ruler of the Lombards in the late 6th and early 7th centuries. According to medieval tradition, the queen, while resting along the banks of the Lambro River, dreamt of a dove, interpreted as a symbol of the Holy Spirit, which uttered the word modo ("here"). Theodelinda is said to have replied etiam ("yes"), signifying her acceptance of the divine indication to found a religious building on that site. The combination of the two words is believed to have given rise to the Latin toponym Modoetia, from which the modern name developed.

This episode is represented in the celebrated 15th-century fresco cycle by the Zavattari brothers in the Chapel of Theodelinda in Monza Cathedral, one of the most significant visual narratives of Lombard royal ideology.

In Roman times, the settlement was known as Modicia, a name attested in epigraphic evidence such as the Ara dei Modiciates, preserved in the Musei Civici di Monza. The etymology of Modicia remains uncertain, though it may derive from a pre-Latin, possibly Celtic root associated with the early Insubrian populations of the region.

The modern Italian form Monza reflects the phonetic evolution of the Latin name through the Lombard vernacular into medieval and early modern Italian.

== History ==
=== Prehistory and Celtic settlement ===
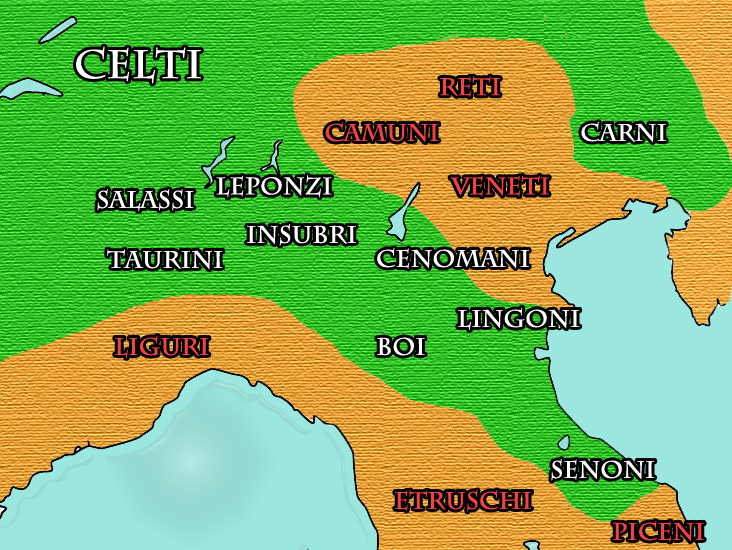
Celtic populations of Cisalpine Gaul

Archaeological evidence indicates that the territory of present-day Monza was inhabited from at least the Bronze Age. Finds discovered in the city and in the surrounding Brianza area include funerary urns, grave goods, weapons, lamps, pins and ceramic vessels, now preserved in local archaeological collections. These discoveries show that the area was part of a broader settlement system in the upper Lombard plain, where rivers, woodland and agricultural land favoured early forms of stable occupation.

During the first millennium BC, the region came into contact with the cultural and commercial networks of northern Italy, including the Etruscan and Celtic worlds. By the 4th century BC, the territory around Milan and Brianza was occupied by the Insubres, a Celtic population settled in Cisalpine Gaul. The settlement that later became Monza was probably part of this Insubrian landscape of villages and rural communities. The ancient name Modicia, later attested in Roman epigraphy, has sometimes been linked to a local Celtic group or to the Modiciates, though the precise origin of the name remains uncertain.

=== Roman period ===
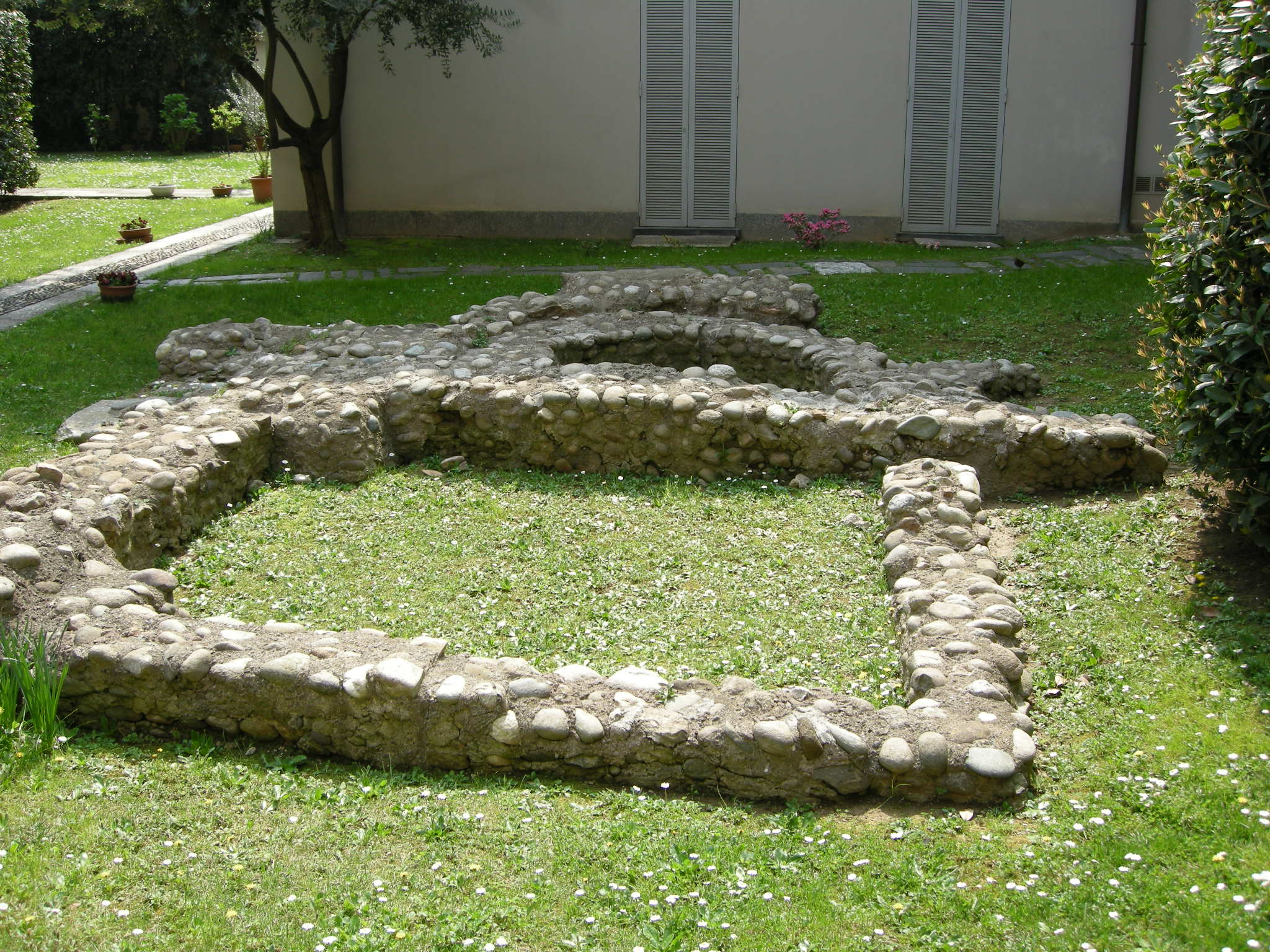
Late Roman nymphaeum near the Cathedral

The Roman conquest of the Insubrian territory took place during the expansion of Rome into the Po Valley in the 3rd and 2nd centuries BC. After the subjugation of the Insubres and the consolidation of Roman authority in Cisalpine Gaul, the settlement of Modicia was gradually incorporated into the Roman administrative and territorial system. Under the Augustan regional division of Italy, the area belonged to Regio XI Transpadana, which corresponded broadly to the territories north of the River Po.

Unlike nearby Mediolanum, which became one of the most important cities of Roman northern Italy, Modicia remained a smaller settlement, probably dependent on Milan and closely connected to its road network. Its position along routes linking Milan with Como, Bergamo and the Alpine approaches gave it local importance, while its economy remained essentially agricultural. Archaeological evidence suggests that the Roman settlement had two main nuclei, one near the present cathedral on the right bank of the Lambro and another on the opposite bank near the area of the later church of San Maurizio.

The most significant surviving evidence of Roman Monza is associated with the Lambro crossing. The Roman bridge known as the Ponte d'Arena, later replaced in the 19th century by the Ponte dei Leoni, connected the two parts of the settlement and carried the road from Milan toward Lecco and Bergamo. Other Roman remains include funerary inscriptions, altars dedicated to Roman divinities, sarcophagi, everyday pottery and architectural elements later reused in medieval buildings. A late Roman nymphaeum, rediscovered near the cathedral area, has been reassembled in the garden of the Casa dei Decumani, testifying to the continuity of occupation into late antiquity.

=== Late antiquity and Ostrogothic rule ===
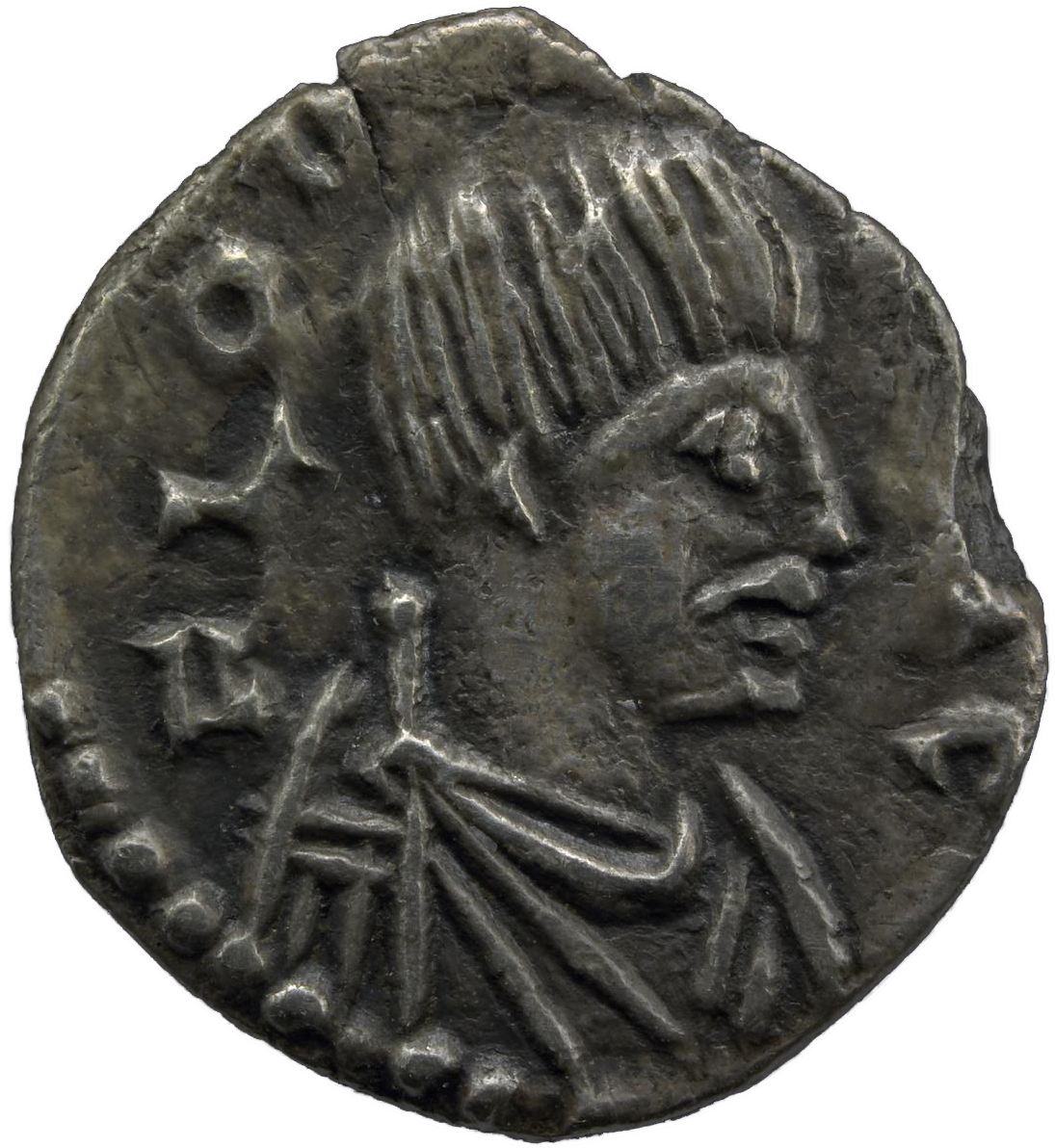
Coin of Odoacer

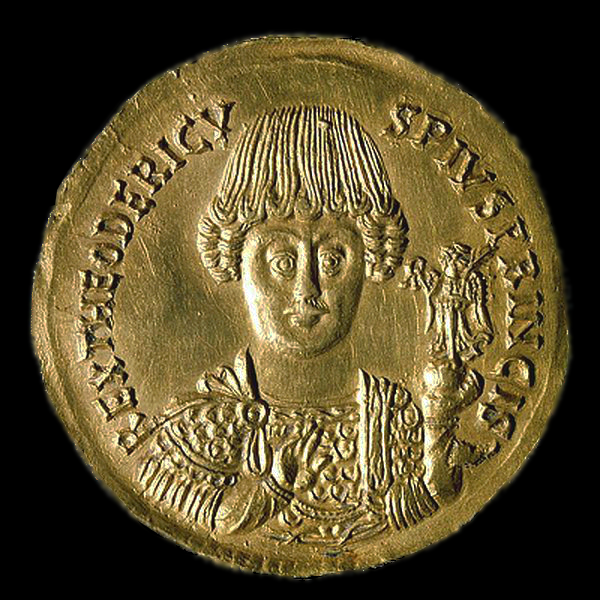
Theodoric the Great

After the fall of the Western Roman Empire in 476, Monza followed the political transformations that affected the whole of northern Italy. The region first came under the authority of Odoacer, who deposed the last western emperor, Romulus Augustulus, and ruled Italy in the name of the eastern emperor. In 493, after the defeat of Odoacer, northern Italy passed under the rule of the Ostrogoths led by Theodoric the Great.

According to the Lombard historian Paul the Deacon, Theodoric had a palace at Monza, although no visible remains of this residence have survived. The reference suggests that the settlement had retained some strategic or residential value in the late antique period, probably because of its position north of Milan and along routes leading toward the Alpine foothills and the upper Lombard plain.

The Gothic War between the Byzantine Empire and the Ostrogoths destabilised much of northern Italy during the 6th century. The conflict weakened older administrative structures and contributed to the fragmentation of political authority across the peninsula. Monza, like other settlements in the Milanese region, was affected by these broader transformations, although the surviving evidence for the city in this period is limited.

In 568 the Lombards, led by Alboin, entered Italy. Their conquest reshaped the political geography of the peninsula and gave Monza a new role. Under Lombard rule, the city became associated with royal power, religious patronage and the memory of the Lombard monarchy.

=== Lombard period ===
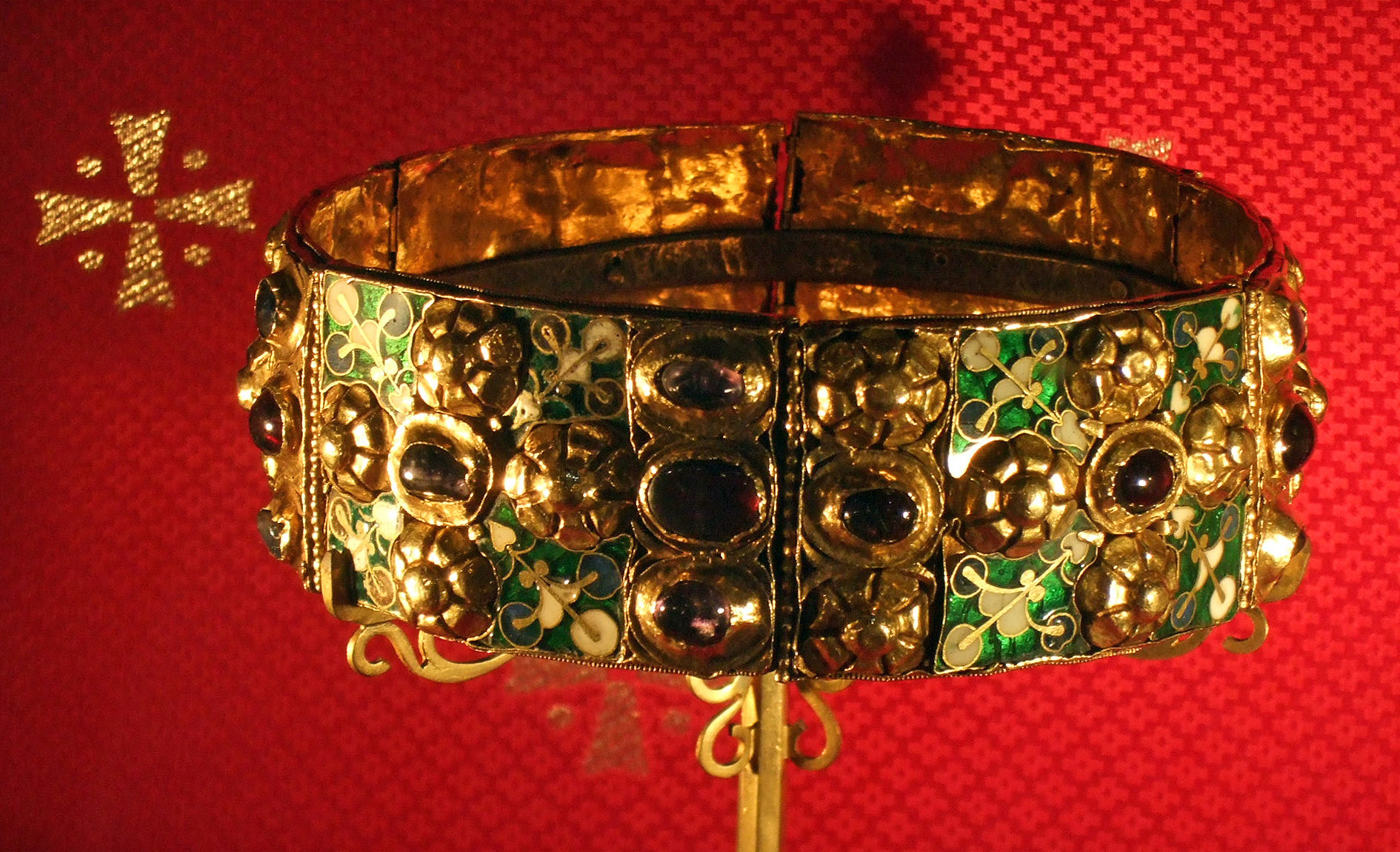
The Iron Crown of Lombardy, preserved in Monza Cathedral

The Lombard kingdom at the death of Agilulf in 616

Monza acquired documented political and religious importance under the Lombards. In 589, the Bavarian princess Theodelinda, daughter of Duke Garibald I of Bavaria, married the Lombard king Authari. After Authari's death in 590, she married Agilulf, duke of Turin, who was then elected king of the Lombards. The royal couple used Milan as one of the principal centres of the kingdom and made Monza a royal residence.

Theodelinda founded a palace at Monza and, near it, an oraculum, or chapel, dedicated to John the Baptist. This building, traditionally dated to 595, became the nucleus of the later Monza Cathedral. Paul the Deacon records in the Historia Langobardorum that Theodelinda built the basilica of Saint John the Baptist at Monza, about twelve miles from Milan, and endowed it with precious liturgical objects.

The queen's patronage gave Monza a place of importance in the religious history of the Lombard kingdom. Theodelinda, who was Catholic, maintained relations with Pope Gregory I, whose letters to her are important evidence for the process by which the Lombards gradually moved from Arian and pagan traditions toward Catholic Christianity. The cathedral treasury preserves objects traditionally connected with this period, including the Evangelary of Theodelinda and other early medieval works of goldsmithery.

The Iron Crown of Lombardy, preserved in the Chapel of Theodelinda, became one of the objects most closely associated with Monza. It was connected for centuries with the coronation of kings of Italy and with the memory of Lombard and imperial kingship. Medieval and early modern tradition held that the crown contained iron from one of the nails of the Crucifixion, although modern scientific analyses have shown that the internal band is made of silver rather than iron.

Theodelinda died in 627 and was buried in the religious complex she had founded. In 1308, her remains were transferred to the chapel dedicated to her within the cathedral. The 15th-century fresco cycle by the Zavattari brothers, painted in the Chapel of Theodelinda, later gave monumental visual form to the queen's role in the foundation legend and in the political memory of the city.

After Theodelinda, the church of Monza continued to acquire religious and temporal importance. The head of the church, later known as the archpriest of Monza, exercised authority over ecclesiastical property and local institutions. The basilica and its treasury became a centre of memory for the Lombard monarchy, and the association between Monza, Theodelinda and the Iron Crown remained central to the city's identity.

In 774, the Lombard kingdom was conquered by Charlemagne, who defeated Desiderius and incorporated northern Italy into the Carolingian political order. Monza preserved its religious prestige after the Frankish conquest, and its connection with royal and imperial symbolism continued into the Carolingian and Ottonian periods.

=== Carolingian and Ottonian periods ===
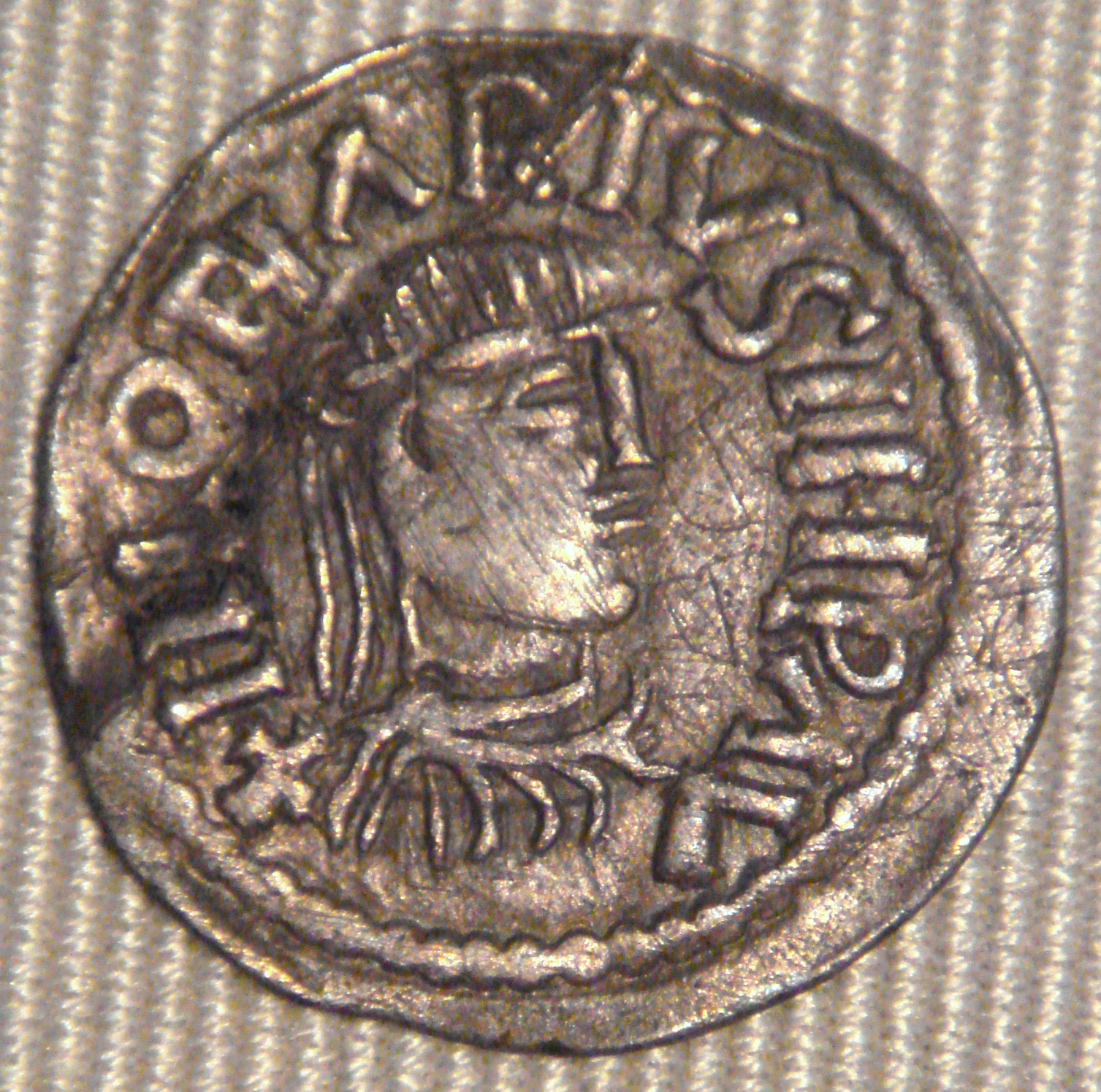
Denier of Lothair I

During the Carolingian and post-Carolingian centuries, Monza remained connected to the institutions of kingship in Italy. The city formed part of the Regnum Italiae, the Kingdom of Italy within the Carolingian and later imperial framework. Although it was not a large urban centre, its cathedral chapter, treasury, school and royal memories gave it symbolic importance beyond its demographic size.

After the division of the Carolingian Empire in 843, Monza belonged to the Italian kingdom assigned to Lothair I. In this period the basilica of Saint John and its chapter continued to hold lands, privileges and liturgical objects connected with royal patronage. The ecclesiastical complex also preserved manuscripts and legal documents, later forming the nucleus of the Capitular Library and Archive of Monza Cathedral.

During the 9th century, a cathedral school and a scriptorium were active in connection with the basilica. The survival of medieval manuscripts and documents shows the cultural role of the cathedral chapter in a period when ecclesiastical institutions were among the main centres of literacy and record keeping. The Glossary of Monza, generally dated to the early 10th century, is among the best-known linguistic witnesses associated with the city and has been studied for its relevance to early Romance and Lombard linguistic forms.

Under Berengar I of Italy, Monza again acquired royal significance. Berengar, who became king of Italy and later emperor, used the city as one of his bases and issued acts connected with its institutions. He is traditionally associated with donations to Monza Cathedral, including the Cross of Berengar, one of the notable objects preserved in the cathedral treasury.

The insecurity of northern Italy during the period of Hungarian raids contributed to the creation or strengthening of defensive structures. By the 10th century, Monza included a fortified area near the Lambro, the cathedral complex and the pratum magnum, a large open space used for assemblies, markets and civic functions. This spatial organisation, combining religious, defensive and commercial areas, influenced the later medieval development of the city.

The association between Monza and imperial authority continued under the Ottonian dynasty. Otto II stayed in the fortified city in 980, and Otto III confirmed protection over Monza and its possessions around the year 1000. These privileges did not make Monza fully independent, but they contributed to the formation of a distinct civic and ecclesiastical identity.

During the 10th and early 11th centuries, however, Monza became increasingly exposed to the influence of Milan. The proximity of the larger city, the growth of Milanese ecclesiastical and political power, and the expansion of regional aristocratic networks would determine much of Monza's medieval history.

=== Communal period and relations with Milan ===
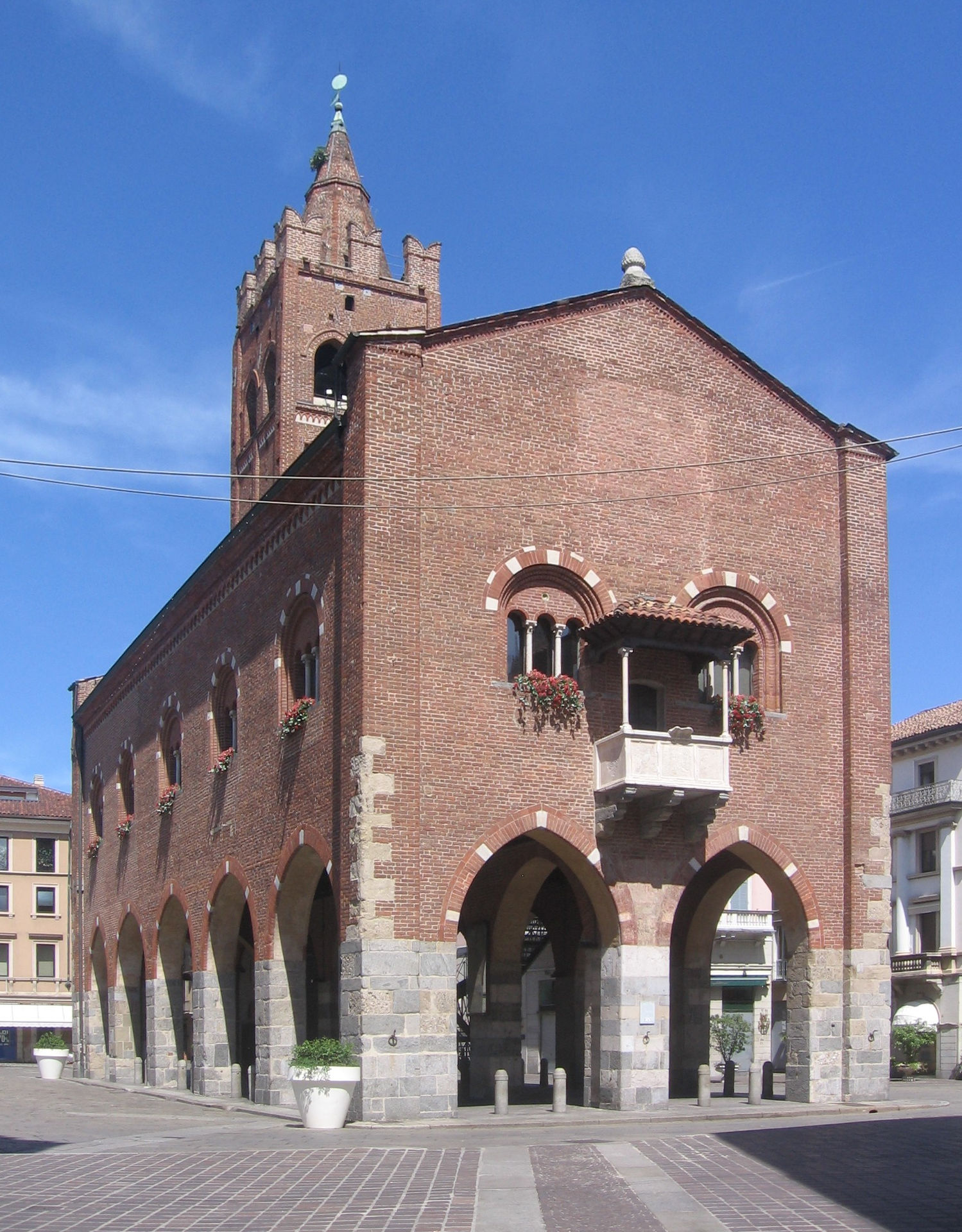
The Arengario, the medieval town hall of Monza

From the 11th century onward, Monza was increasingly drawn into the political orbit of Milan. In 1018, Aribert of Intimiano, formerly lord of Monza, became archbishop of Milan, a development that strengthened Milanese influence over the city. At the same time, Monza retained ecclesiastical privileges, and the archpriest of the cathedral continued to exercise both spiritual and temporal authority.

The origins of the commune of Monza are generally placed between the late 11th and early 12th centuries, within the broader development of communal institutions in northern Italy. During the 12th century, Monza had a population estimated at several thousand inhabitants, and agricultural activity was accompanied by the growth of artisanal production, particularly in textiles and wool processing.

In 1128, Conrad III of Germany was crowned king of Italy in the church of San Michele in Monza, reflecting the city's continuing association with royal and imperial ceremonial. In the following decades, Monza was involved in the conflicts between the Holy Roman emperors and the communes of northern Italy. Frederick I Barbarossa visited the city and granted it privileges, including rights connected to tolls and administration, in the context of the imperial struggle against the Lombard League.

The autonomy of Monza remained limited. After the Peace of Constance in 1183, Milan regained influence over surrounding territories, and Monza became increasingly dependent on the larger city. The same century saw the consolidation of civic institutions and the transformation of the urban structure. The pratum magnum, corresponding to the present Piazza Trento e Trieste, functioned as a civic and commercial space, while the cathedral remained the centre of religious authority.

In the 13th century, the construction of the Arengario gave architectural expression to communal authority. Built as the medieval town hall, the Arengario stood in civic contrast to the cathedral and represented municipal governance. During this period Monza was involved in the conflicts between the Guelphs and Ghibellines and in the struggles between the Della Torre and Visconti families for control of Milan and its surrounding territory.

=== Visconti and Sforza periods ===
Coat of arms of the Visconti

After the victory of the Visconti over the Della Torre at the Battle of Desio in 1277, Monza became progressively subject to the political authority of Milan. The city retained its civic institutions and ecclesiastical importance, but its strategic position made it a contested area during the struggles between Milanese factions and external powers.

In the early 14th century, Monza was repeatedly involved in conflicts between the Visconti, the Torriani and imperial forces. In 1325 Galeazzo I Visconti initiated a programme of fortification after taking the city following a siege. These works included the construction of a castle along the Lambro and the creation of the artificial branch of the river known as the Lambretto.

The castle became a central element of the defensive system, later expanded during the 14th century. The urban structure of Monza at this time included the cathedral complex, the civic centre represented by the Arengario, the market area and the defensive line along the river.

Around 1300, the rebuilding of Monza Cathedral in Gothic form began under Visconti patronage. The building preserved the earlier Lombard foundation and remained associated with the Iron Crown of Lombardy, maintaining its ceremonial relevance.

In 1354, Pope Innocent VI confirmed the rights connected with the use of the Iron Crown in Monza Cathedral, reinforcing the city's symbolic role. During the later 14th century, Monza remained linked to Visconti dynastic politics. Gian Galeazzo Visconti granted the castle to his wife Caterina, who died there in 1404 after imprisonment.

In the early 15th century, Estorre Visconti was proclaimed lord of Monza and used the city during succession conflicts within the Duchy of Milan. After his death in 1413, the city returned under ducal control.

Between 1440 and 1446, the Zavattari workshop painted the fresco cycle in the Chapel of Theodelinda, illustrating scenes from the life of the Lombard queen. The cycle represents a significant example of late Gothic painting in Lombardy.

After the death of Filippo Maria Visconti in 1447, Monza followed the political developments of Milan and passed under the House of Sforza in 1450.

=== Early modern period ===
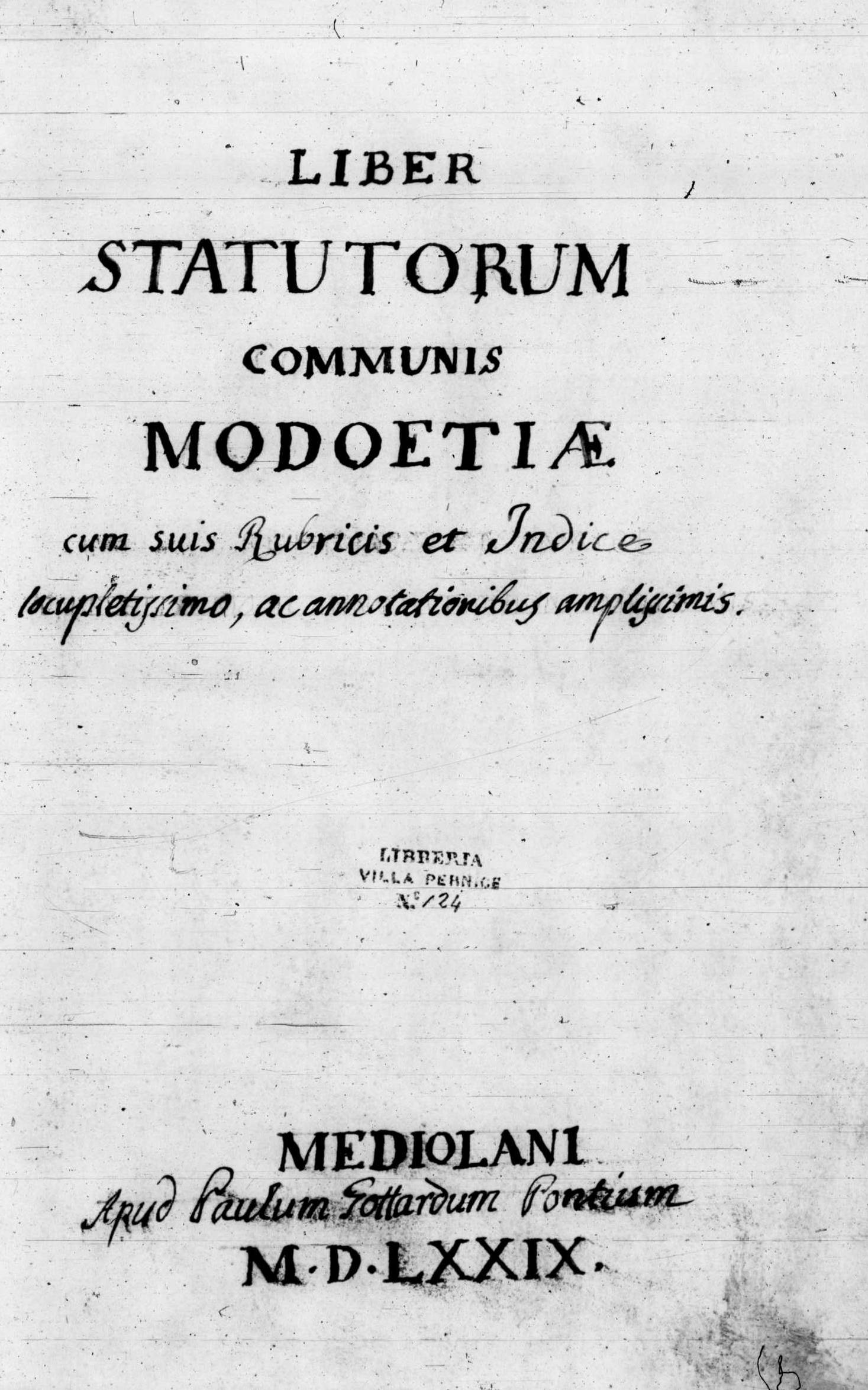
The statutes of Monza (1579)

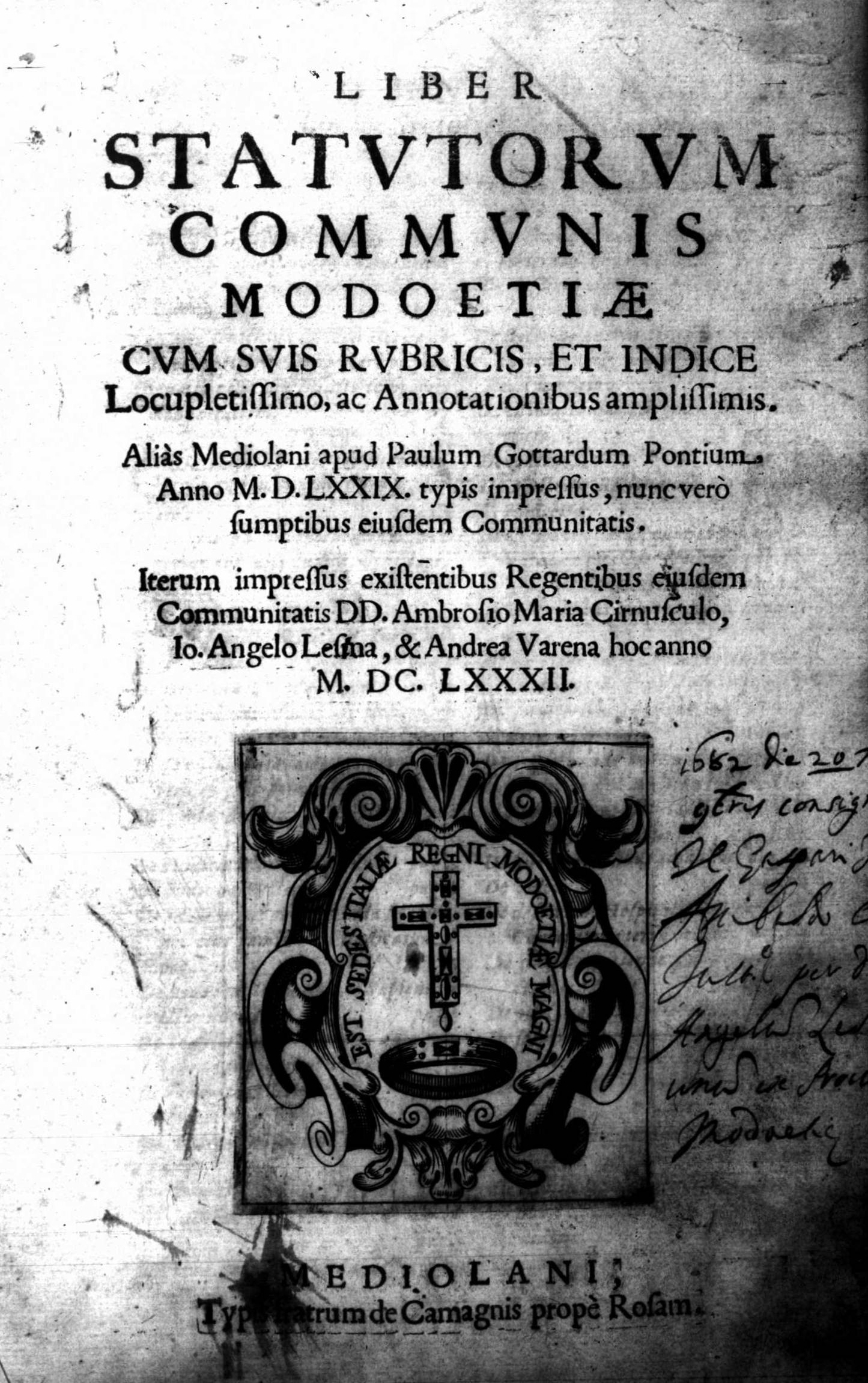
The statutes of Monza (1682)

In the late 15th and early 16th centuries, Monza was affected by the Italian Wars, during which the Duchy of Milan was contested by France, the Holy Roman Empire and other powers. Its position near Milan exposed it to military movements and political instability.

Following the French occupation of Milan in 1500 and subsequent conflicts, the Duchy passed under imperial control after the Battle of Pavia in 1525. In 1527, imperial troops led by Antonio de Leyva sacked Monza, causing significant damage. An explosion in the same period partially destroyed the castle.

After the extinction of the Sforza line in 1535, the Duchy of Milan came under Spanish Habsburg rule. Monza remained within this political structure, maintaining its municipal statutes and institutions while subject to the fiscal and administrative system of Spanish Lombardy.

The printed statutes of Monza, including the 1579 Liber statutorum communis Modoetiae, document the continued operation of civic law.

The 16th and 17th centuries were marked by epidemics, including the plague of 1576–1577 and the major outbreak of 1630, which caused demographic and economic disruption.

In 1648 Monza passed under the control of the Durini family, who acquired feudal rights and contributed to local economic and cultural development.

=== Austrian rule and the Royal Villa ===
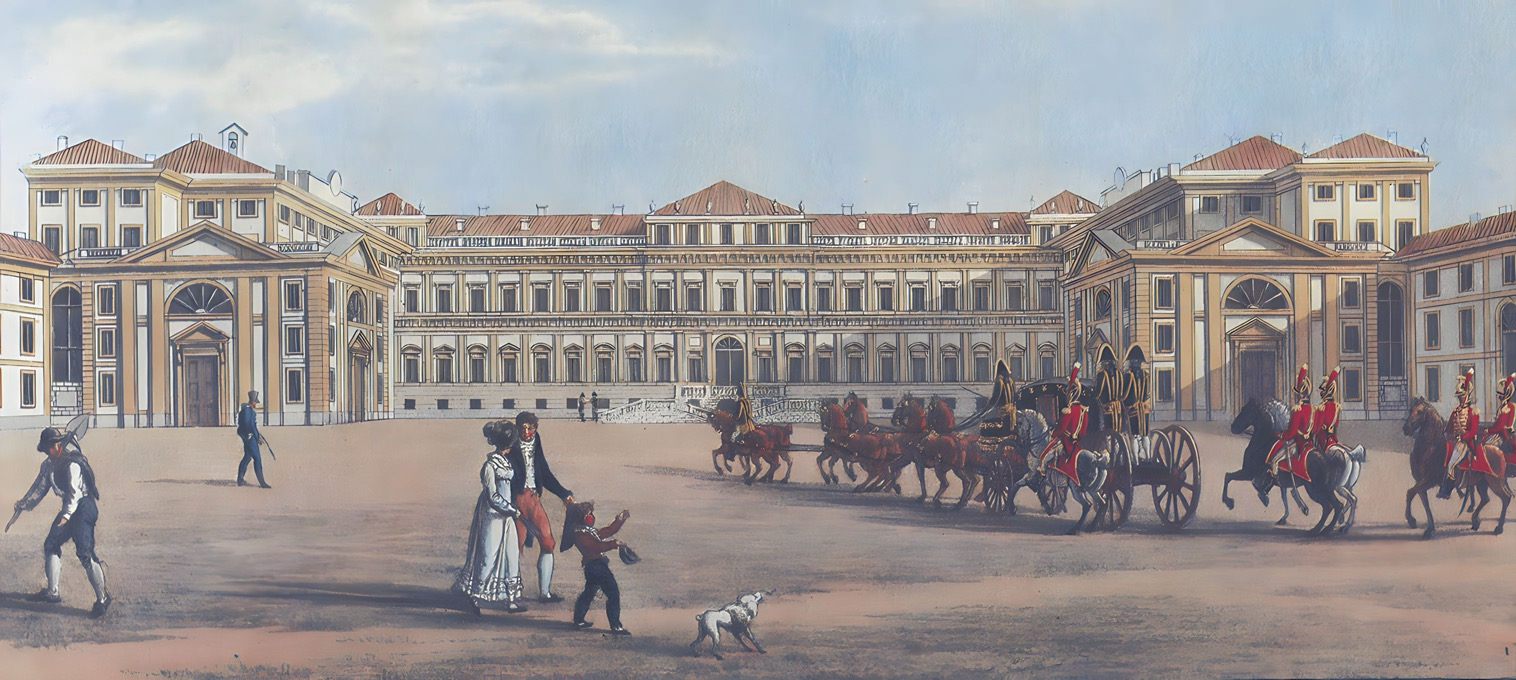
The Royal Villa of Monza in an 18th-century drawing

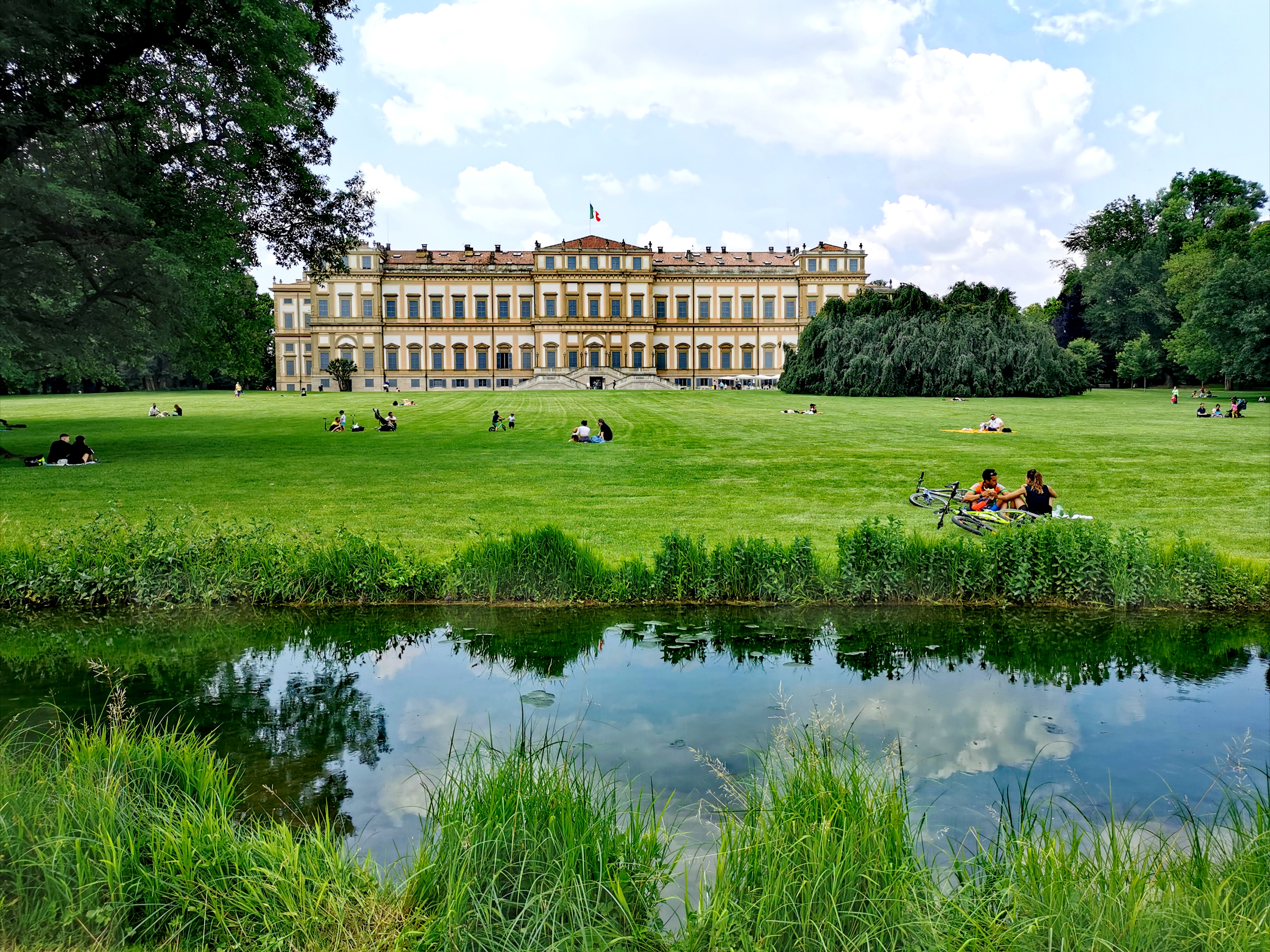
The Royal Villa and gardens

At the conclusion of the War of the Spanish Succession, the Duchy of Milan passed from Spanish to Austrian Habsburg control, as confirmed by the treaties of Utrecht (1713) and Rastatt (1714). Monza became part of Austrian Lombardy and experienced a phase of administrative reorganisation and economic recovery.

Agriculture and artisanal production expanded during the 18th century, supported by relative political stability. The presence of aristocratic estates and the proximity to Milan contributed to the development of villas and cultivated landscapes in the surrounding territory.

A major transformation of the period was the construction of the Royal Villa of Monza. Commissioned by Empress Maria Theresa of Austria for her son Archduke Ferdinand of Austria-Este, governor of Lombardy, the villa was designed by architect Giuseppe Piermarini and built between 1777 and 1780.

The project responded to both political and practical considerations, including proximity to Milan, the availability of land and the suitability of the landscape for a suburban residence. The villa introduced a new architectural and institutional dimension to Monza, linking it directly to the Habsburg administrative and court system in Lombardy.

The complex included the main residential structure, service buildings, formal gardens and agricultural land. Its presence influenced the spatial organisation of the northern part of the city and contributed to the development of aristocratic and administrative functions in Monza.

=== Napoleonic period ===
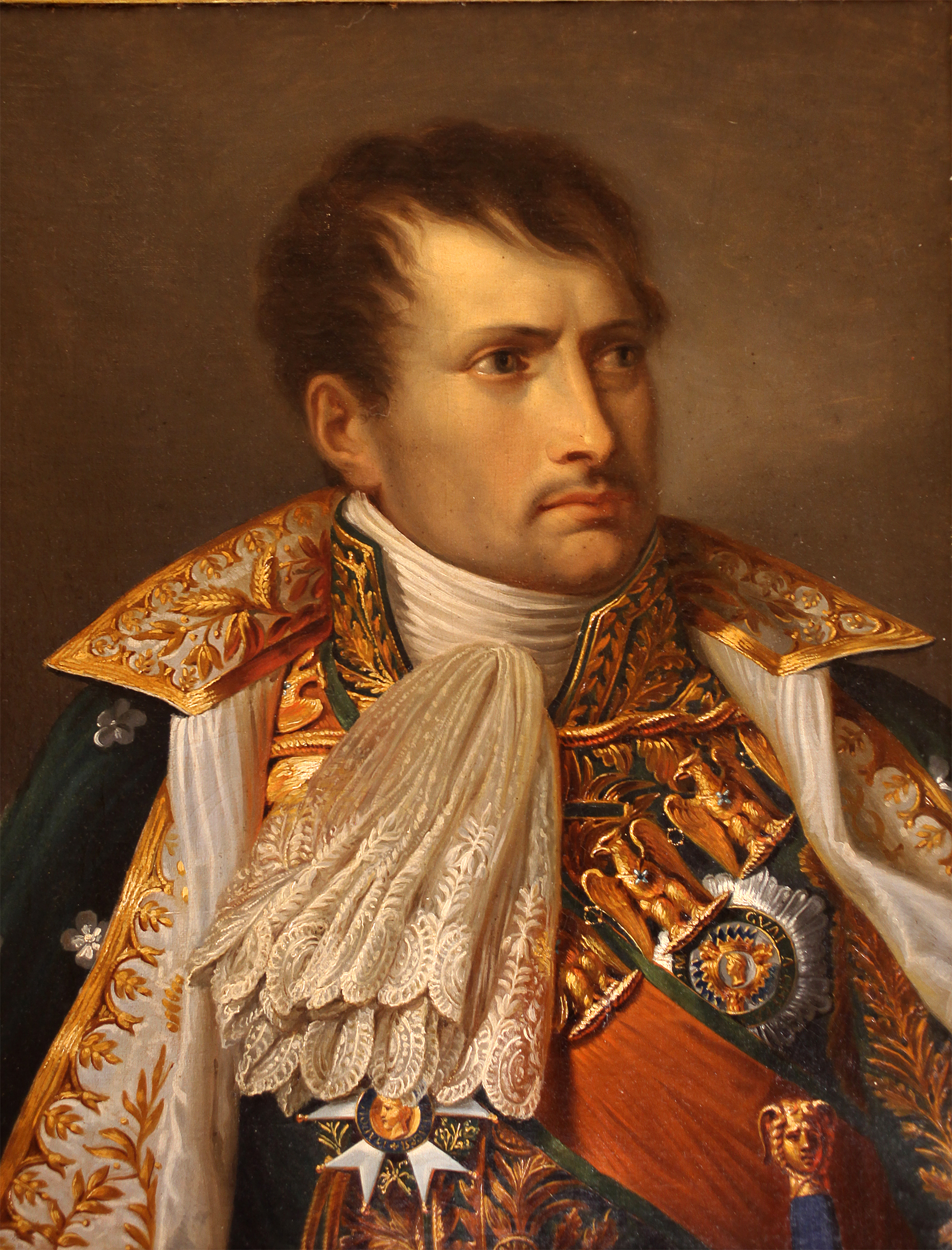
Napoleon as King of Italy

Flag of the Napoleonic Kingdom of Italy

The arrival of Napoleon Bonaparte in northern Italy in 1796 brought Monza into the administrative system of the French revolutionary states. The Duchy of Milan became part of the Cisalpine Republic, later reorganised as the Italian Republic and subsequently as the Kingdom of Italy (Napoleonic).

The Royal Villa, initially associated with aristocratic privilege, was preserved and later reused. Under the Napoleonic Kingdom, it became a residence for Eugène de Beauharnais, viceroy of Italy, and was adapted for administrative and ceremonial functions.

The Iron Crown acquired renewed political significance when Napoleon used it for his coronation as King of Italy in 1805. The event reinforced the symbolic association between the crown and sovereignty in Italy.

During the same period, the cathedral treasury was subject to confiscations, with precious materials and objects requisitioned for financial and military purposes.

In 1807 the Visconti castle was demolished. Its materials were reused in the construction of the enclosure of the large park planned by Luigi Canonica between 1806 and 1808. The park integrated agricultural land, woodland, villas and infrastructure into a single managed landscape.

This intervention permanently reshaped the northern area of Monza and established the physical framework of the present park.

=== Restoration and Risorgimento ===
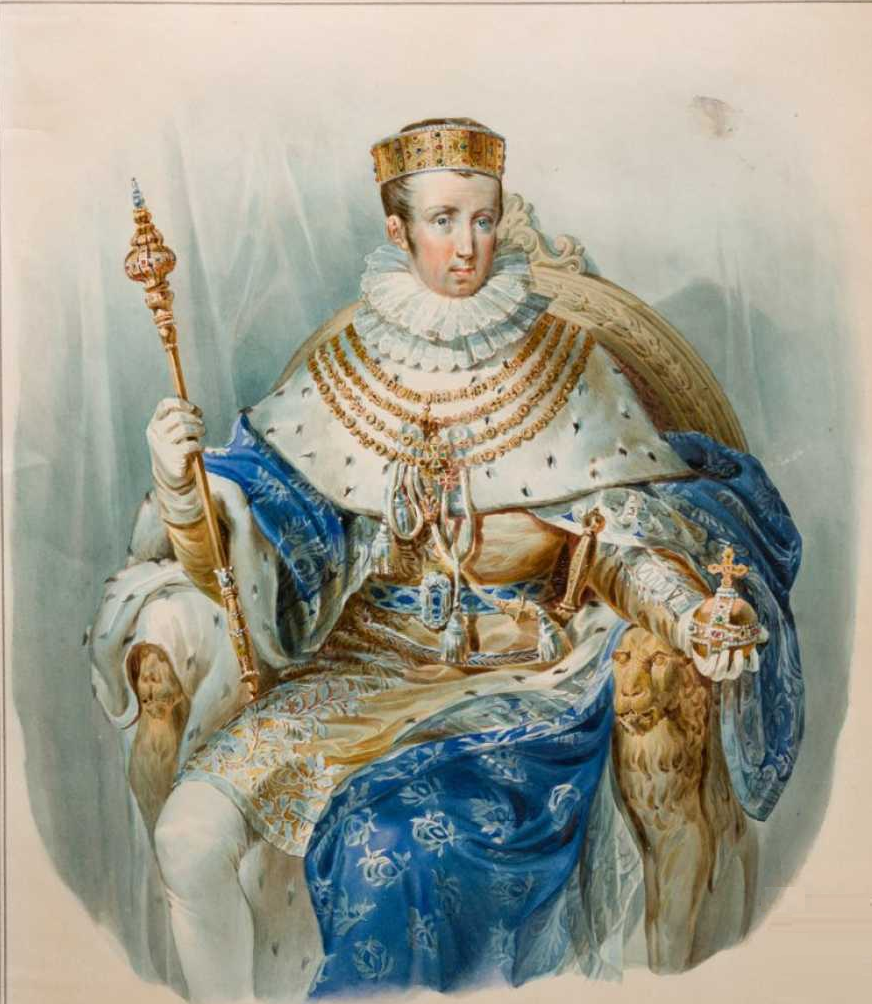
Ferdinand I of Austria wearing the Iron Crown

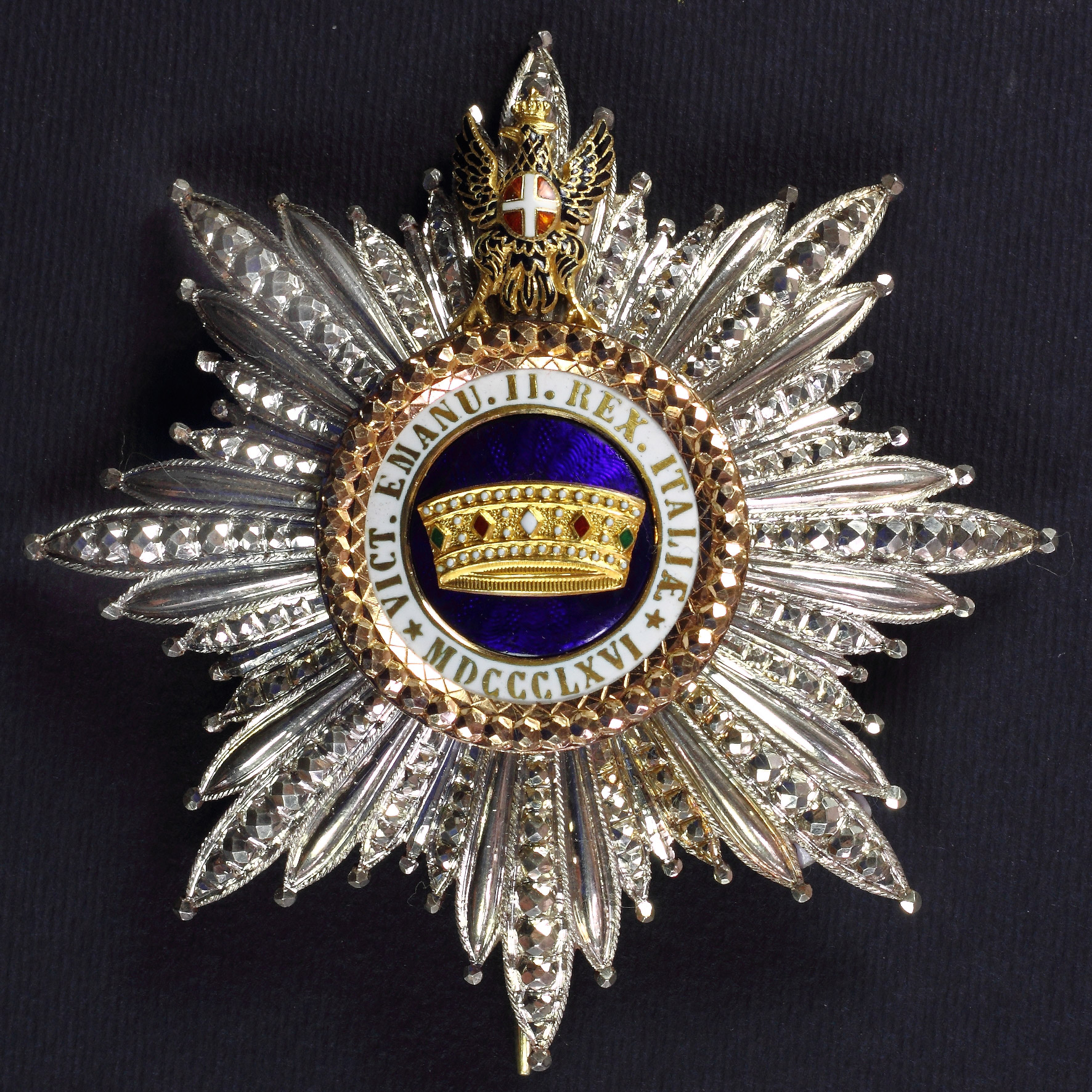
Star of the Order of the Crown of Italy

After the Congress of Vienna in 1815, Monza returned to Austrian rule as part of the Kingdom of Lombardy-Venetia.

In 1816 Monza was formally granted the title of city. The Royal Villa continued to be used by members of the Habsburg administration and by representatives of imperial authority.

During this period, local authorities sought the return of objects removed during the Napoleonic era. Some manuscripts and artworks were recovered, although others had been lost.

The development of infrastructure contributed to the integration of Monza into the regional economy. In 1840 the Milan-Monza railway was inaugurated, one of the earliest railway lines in northern Italy, strengthening connections between Monza and Milan.

Urban improvements included new roads, bridges and public services. The construction of the Ponte dei Leoni in 1842 replaced the earlier Roman bridge and improved circulation through the city.

During the revolutions of 1848, Monza participated in the uprisings against Austrian rule connected with the Five Days of Milan. Austrian control was restored after the failure of the First Italian War of Independence.

Monza became part of the Kingdom of Sardinia in 1859 and of the Kingdom of Italy in 1861. The Iron Crown was returned from Vienna to Monza after the Third War of Independence in 1866.

In 1868, the Order of the Crown of Italy was established, incorporating symbolic references to the Iron Crown.

=== Industrialisation in the 19th century ===
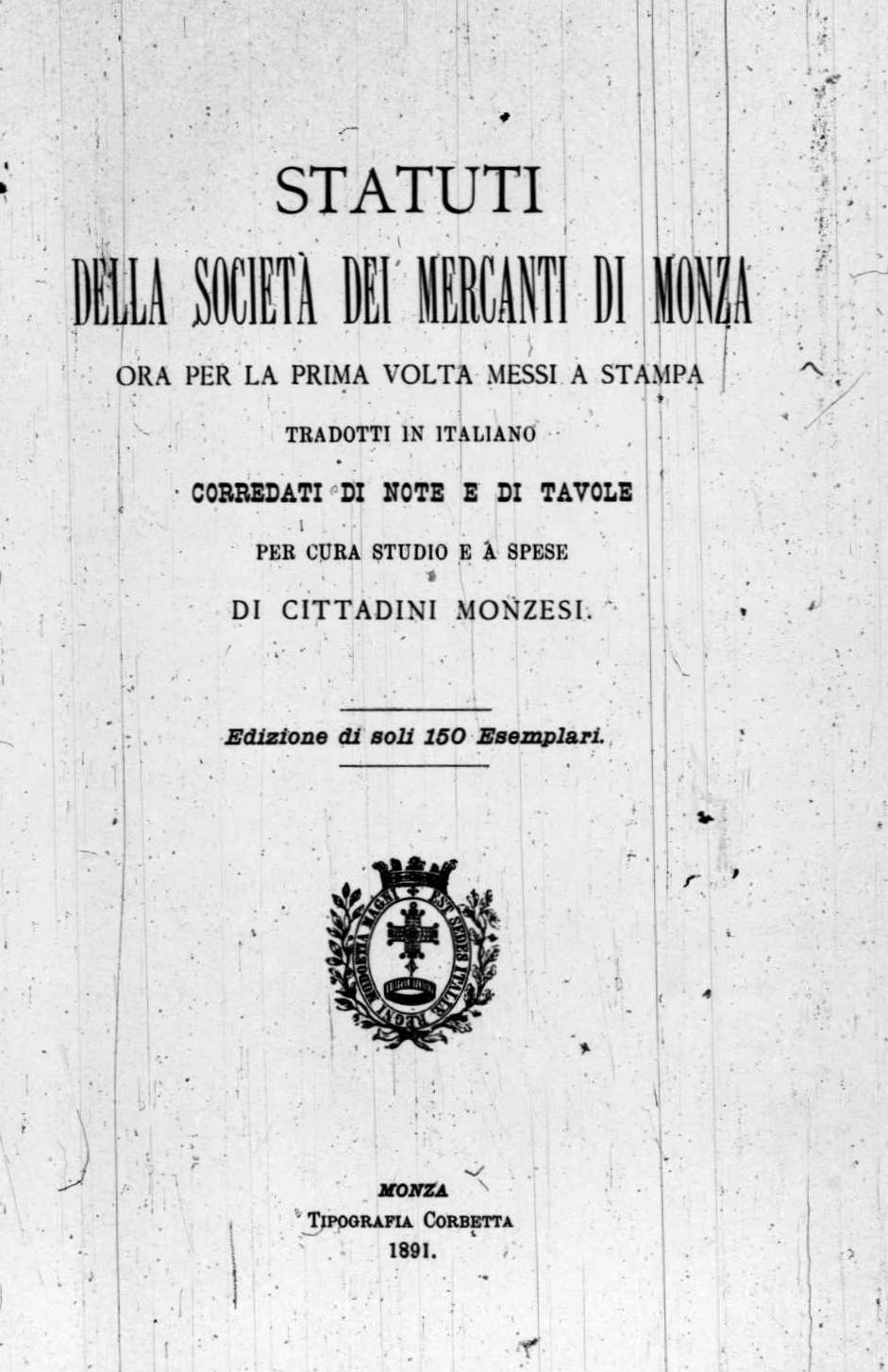
Statutes of the merchants of Monza, 1891

Following Italian unification, Monza underwent industrial and demographic expansion. Its traditional economy, based on agriculture and artisanal production, gradually evolved into a manufacturing system.

The Lambro River had long supported economic activity through water-powered mills. In the 19th century, these activities were increasingly integrated into mechanised industrial production. Textile manufacturing, mechanical engineering and electrical production developed alongside traditional crafts.

Hat production represented one of the most distinctive industrial sectors of Monza. The activity expanded significantly in the late 19th century, with local firms supplying national and international markets.

Industrial growth also led to the development of civic institutions. The civic library was established in 1870, and in 1891 the hospital dedicated to Gerardo dei Tintori was inaugurated.

By the end of the 19th century, Monza had a population of approximately 37,500 inhabitants and an urban structure composed of residential areas, industrial facilities and surrounding agricultural land.

=== Regicide of Umberto I ===
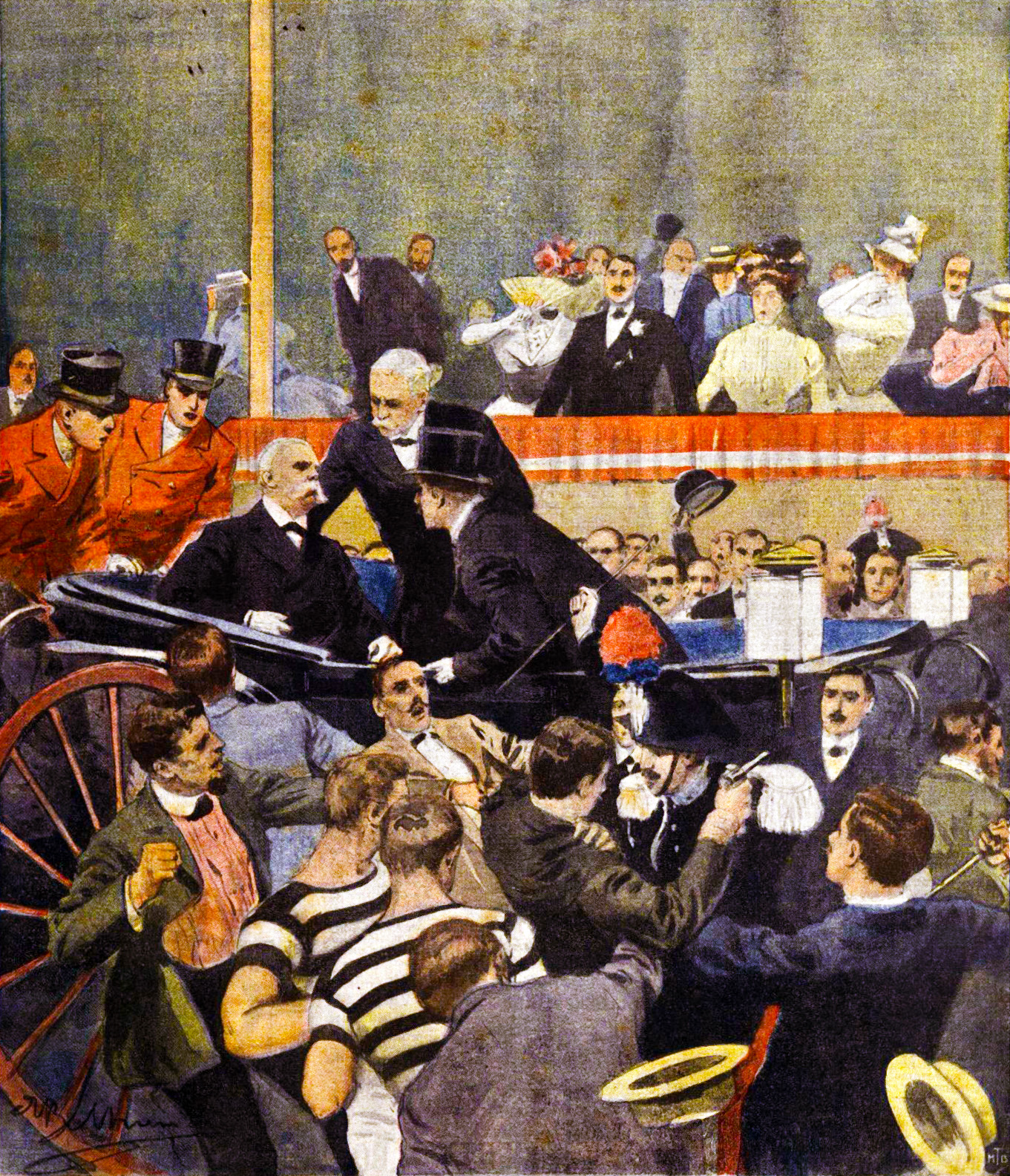
The assassination of King Umberto I

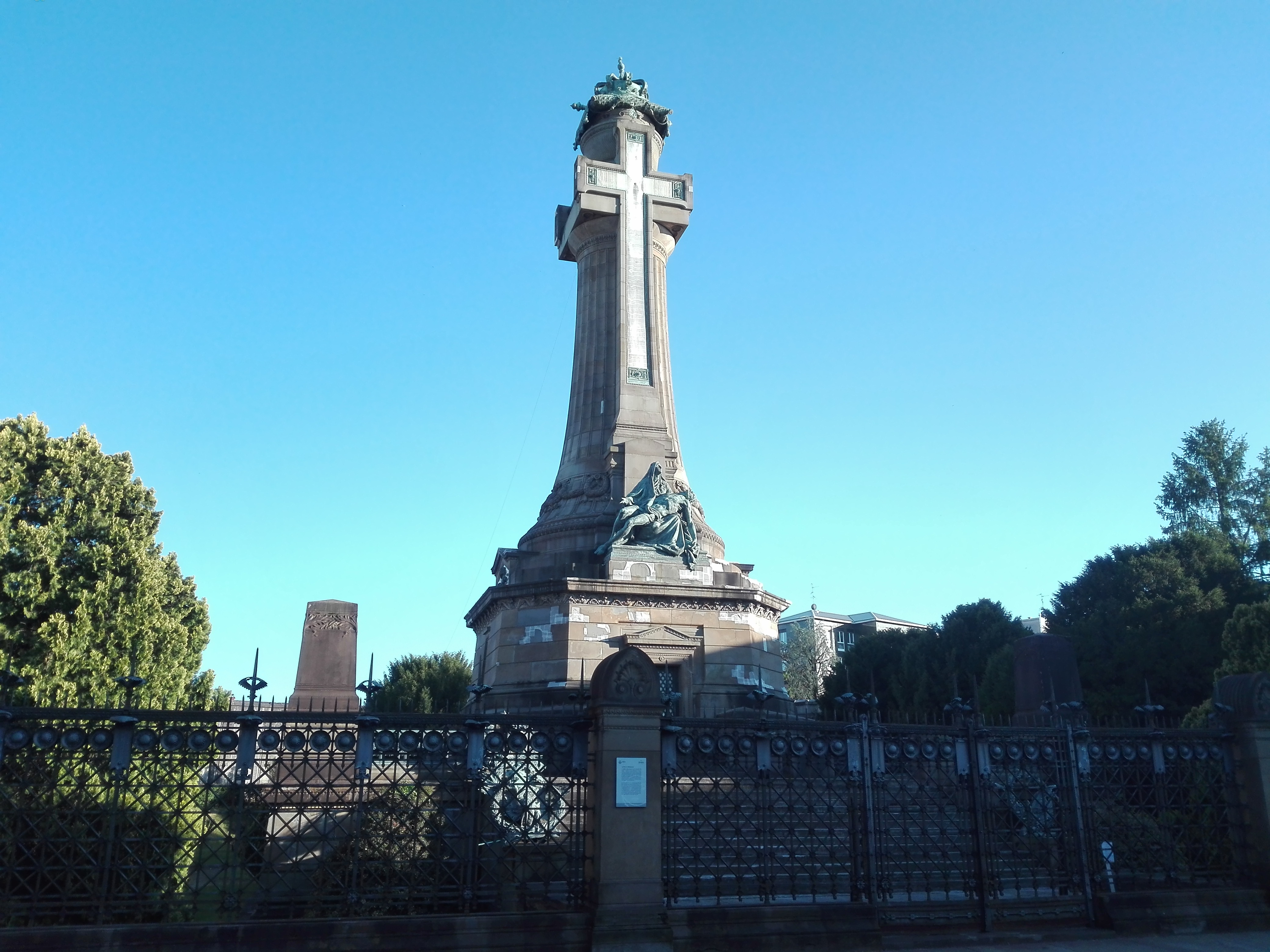
The Expiatory Chapel

On 29 July 1900, King Umberto I of Italy was assassinated in Monza by the anarchist Gaetano Bresci.

The king was in the city for a public event organised by the Forti e Liberi sports society. After leaving the venue, he was shot at close range. He died shortly afterwards at the Royal Villa.

Bresci stated that the act was motivated by political reasons linked to the repression of protests in the 1890s.

Following the assassination, King Victor Emmanuel III ordered the construction of the Expiatory Chapel of Monza at the site of the event.

The Royal Villa was subsequently used less frequently by the royal family.

=== Early 20th century and Fascist period ===
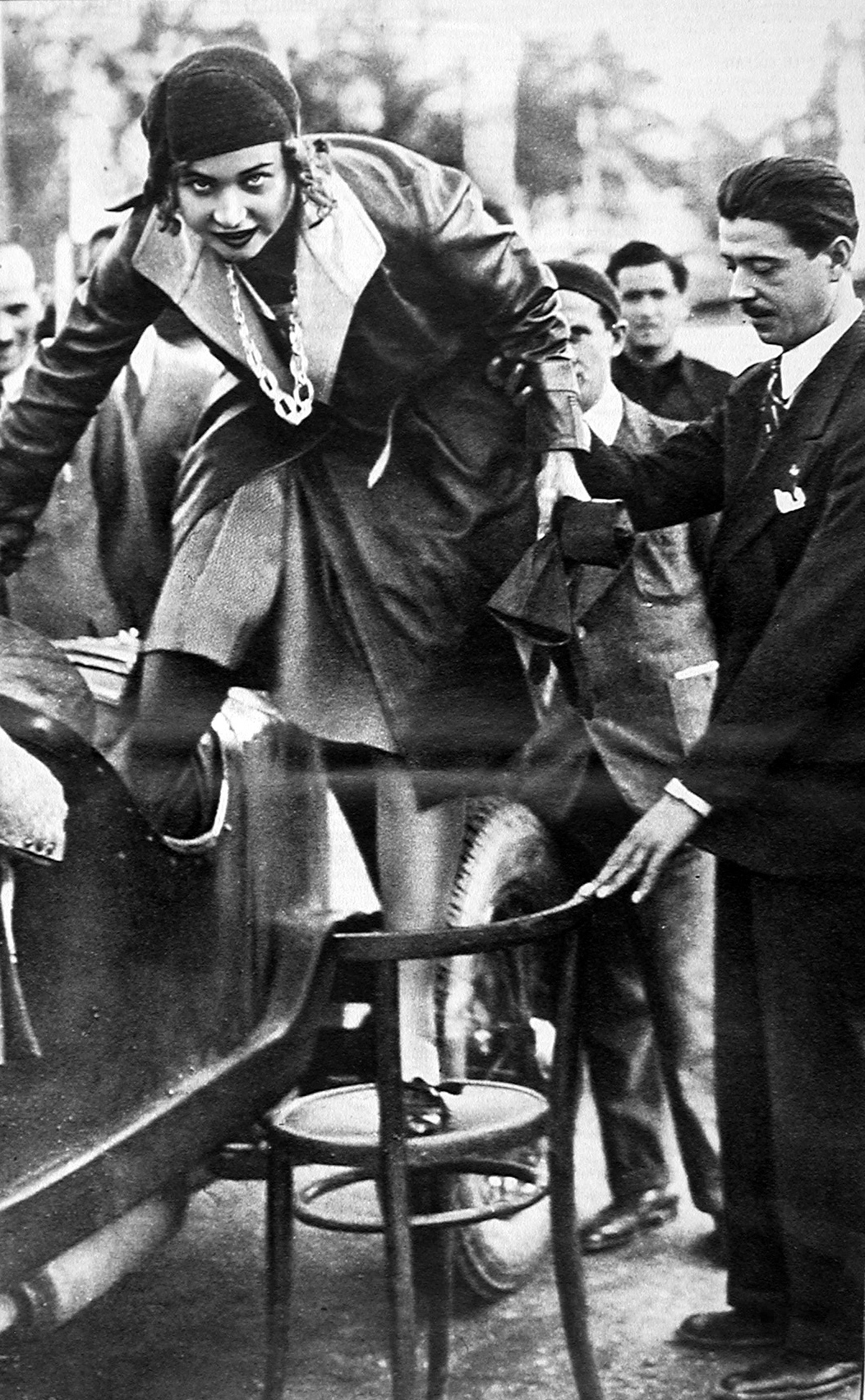
Maria José of Belgium at the Monza circuit in 1930

At the beginning of the 20th century, Monza had a population of over 40,000 inhabitants and was included among the industrial centres of northern Italy. Economic activity was concentrated in textile manufacturing, mechanical production and related industries, reflecting the broader industrial structure of the Brianza area.

The First World War affected the city through mobilisation, economic disruption and casualties. After the war, Monza commemorated its dead with the construction of the Monumento ai Caduti, completed in 1932 in Piazza Trento e Trieste.

During the interwar period, urban expansion continued and the historic centre underwent transformation. Older structures were demolished or altered, and the former market square was reorganised into its modern form. Planning measures introduced in the 1920s aimed to regulate growth, although development remained uneven.

In 1922, the Autodromo Nazionale di Monza was constructed within Monza Park. The circuit quickly became part of the international calendar of motor racing events. In 1925, a golf course was also established within the park, contributing to the transformation of the area into a recreational and sporting landscape.

The Royal Villa hosted the Istituto Superiore di Industrie Artistiche (ISIA), founded in 1922. The institution became associated with developments in applied arts and design in Italy.

By the early 1930s, the population had reached approximately 60,000 inhabitants, and industrial production had expanded, although traditional sectors such as hat manufacturing began to decline.

=== Second World War and Resistance ===
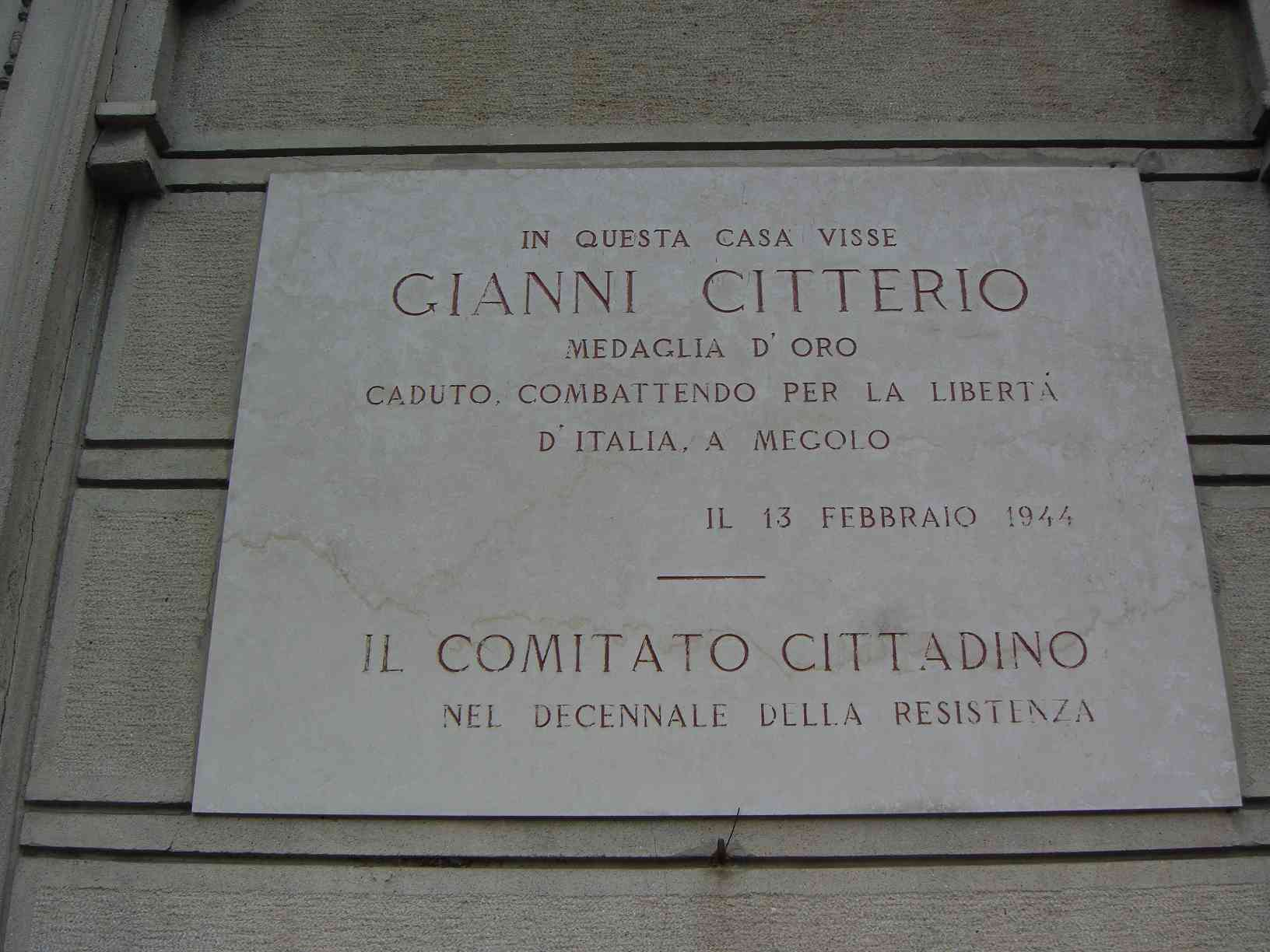
Plaque dedicated to Gianni Citterio

During the Second World War, Monza was affected by air raids, economic disruption and military occupation. The city was subjected to repeated bombing between 1940 and 1945, targeting infrastructure and industrial facilities.

Following the armistice of 8 September 1943, Monza was occupied by German forces and became part of the territory controlled by the Italian Social Republic. Military commands were established in several buildings, and the city became integrated into the German military system in northern Italy.

Repression of political opposition and partisan activity intensified during this period. Arrests, interrogations and deportations affected residents, including members of the local Jewish community, some of whom were sent to concentration camps such as Auschwitz.

Clandestine anti-Fascist groups operated within the city, maintaining connections with the broader Resistance movement in Lombardy. Among those involved was Gianni Citterio, a local partisan who later became a symbol of the Resistance in Monza.

In April 1945, as the general insurrection spread across northern Italy, the local Committee of National Liberation assumed control of the city administration. Armed clashes were limited, and negotiations contributed to a relatively orderly transition.

American forces entered Monza shortly afterwards, and German troops withdrew. The end of the war marked a transition to civilian administration and reconstruction.

=== Post-war expansion and contemporary city ===
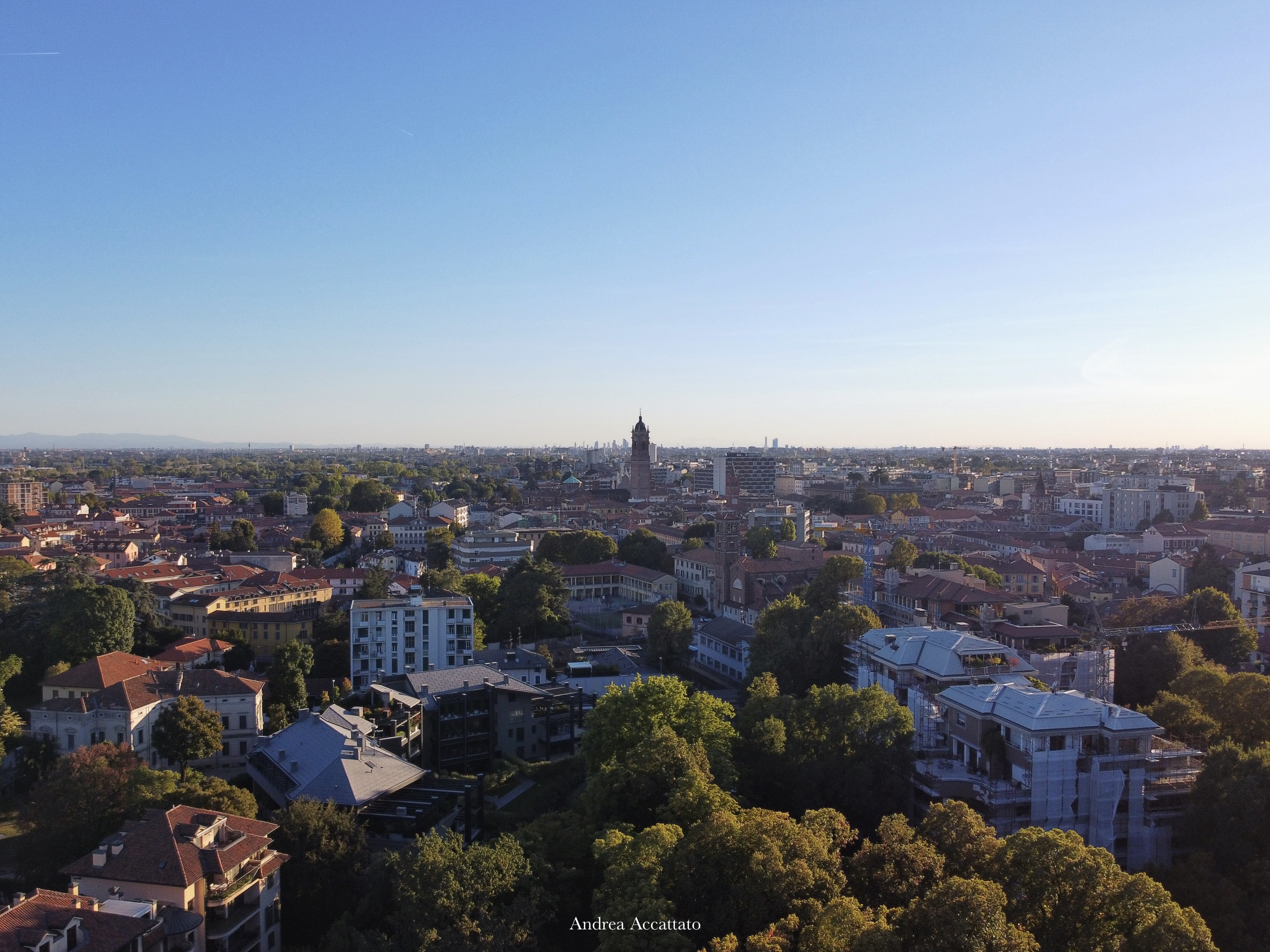
Panorama of Monza in 2022

After the Second World War, Monza experienced rapid population growth and urban expansion. The city's development was closely connected to the growth of Milan and the industrialisation of the Brianza region. New residential districts, infrastructure and industrial areas expanded beyond the historic centre.

Industrial activity remained important, although the economic structure gradually diversified. Manufacturing sectors were complemented by services, healthcare, education and administrative functions.

The University of Milano-Bicocca established teaching and research facilities in Monza, particularly in medical and organisational disciplines. The San Gerardo Hospital developed into a major healthcare centre within the regional system.

Monza Park and the Royal Villa remained central to the urban and cultural landscape, while the Autodromo continued to host international motorsport events.

In 2004, Monza became the capital of the newly established Province of Monza and Brianza, which became operational in 2009.

Recent infrastructure projects have included the construction of the Viale Lombardia tunnel, completed in 2013, aimed at reducing traffic congestion and improving urban connectivity.

== Geography ==
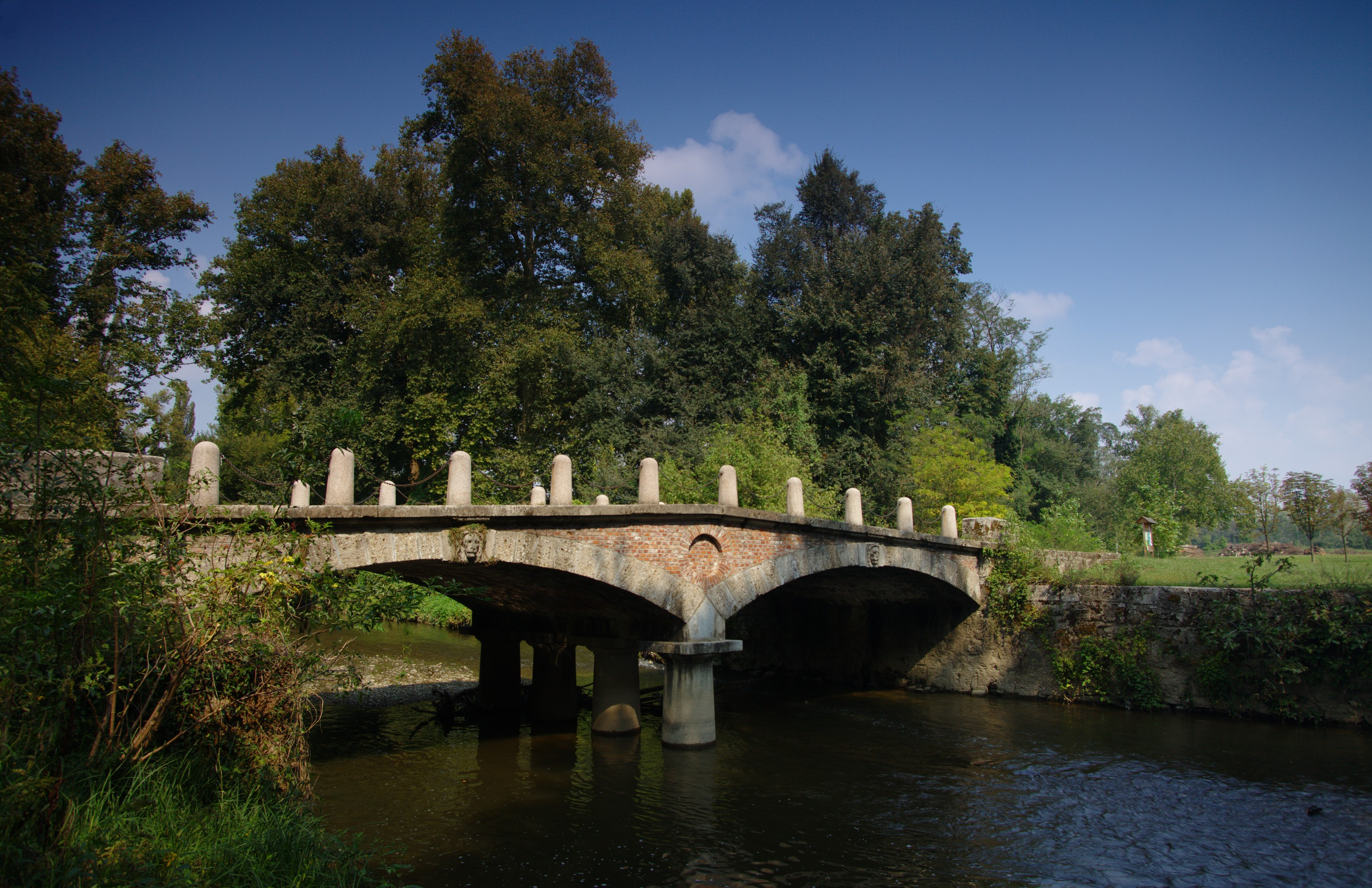
Monza Park and surrounding landscape

Monza is located in northern Italy, in the Lombardy region, approximately 15 kilometres (9.3 mi) north-northeast of Milan. The city lies within the central sector of the Po Valley, one of the largest alluvial plains in Europe, extending from the Alpine arc to the Adriatic Sea.

The municipal territory covers approximately 33.03 square kilometres (12.75 sq mi) and is situated at an average elevation of 162 metres (531 ft) above sea level. The terrain is predominantly flat, formed by Quaternary alluvial deposits associated with the Lambro river system and broader Po Valley sedimentation processes.

Monza is positioned at the transition between the lower Brianza area and the Milanese plain. To the north, the landscape gradually rises toward the Brianza hills and the foothills of the Alps, while to the south it merges into the continuous urban fabric of the Milan metropolitan area.

The city forms part of a highly urbanised corridor characterised by strong functional integration. Its built-up area is contiguous with neighbouring municipalities including Lissone, Muggiò, Brugherio, Vedano al Lambro and Sesto San Giovanni.

=== Hydrography ===
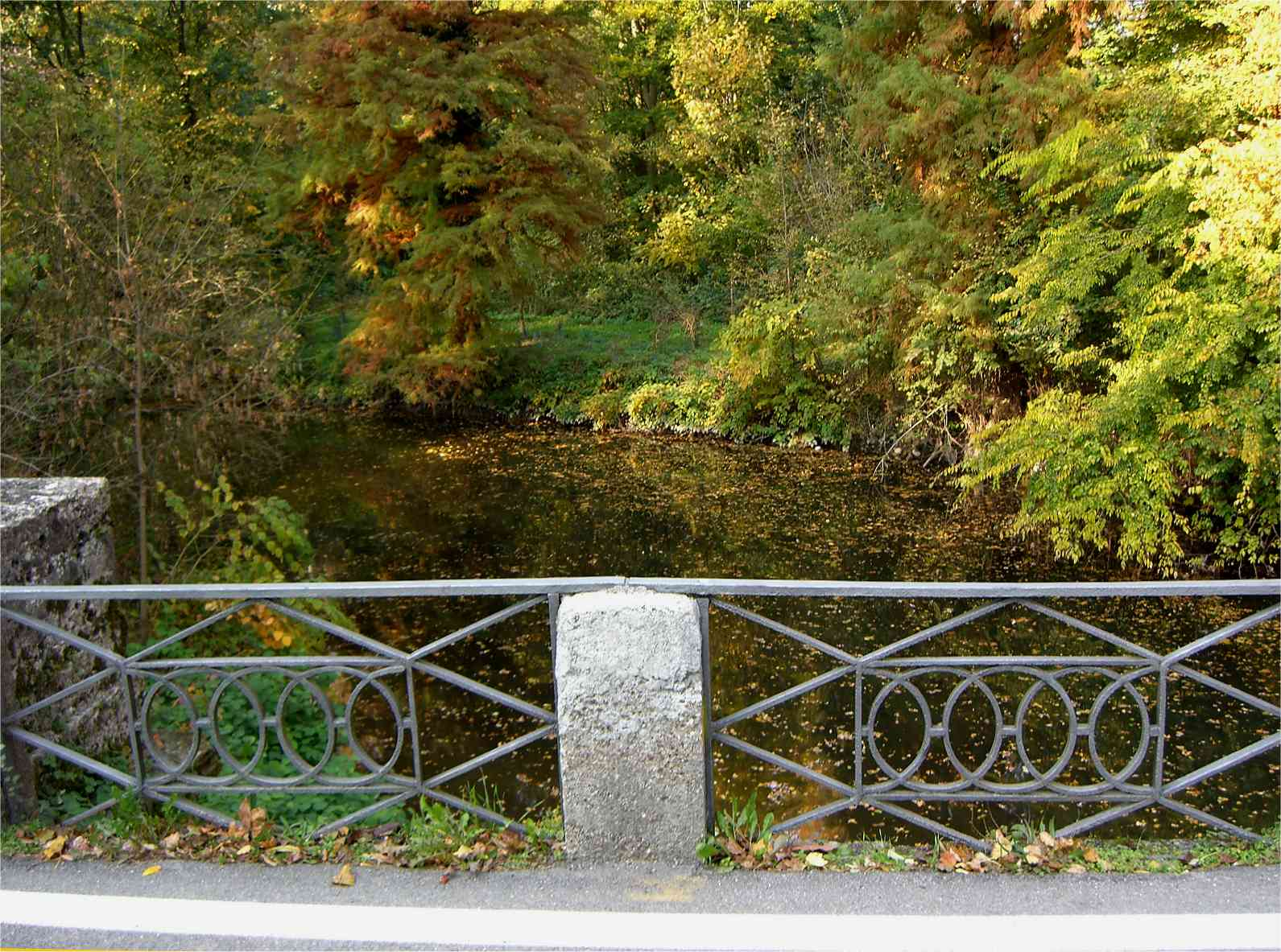
The Lambro River in Monza

The hydrographic system of Monza is centred on the Lambro River, which crosses the city from north to south and constitutes one of the main tributaries of the Po River.

Within the urban area, the river divides into branches, including the artificial channel known as the Lambretto. This channel, created in the medieval period, served both defensive and hydraulic functions, regulating water flow and supporting fortifications.

The Canale Villoresi, constructed in the late 19th century, crosses the northern part of the municipal territory from west to east. It forms part of a large irrigation network designed to support agricultural activity in Lombardy.

The hydrographic network also includes minor streams, irrigation channels and artificial waterways, reflecting centuries of human intervention in water management. These systems have shaped both the landscape and the historical development of the city.

=== Climate ===
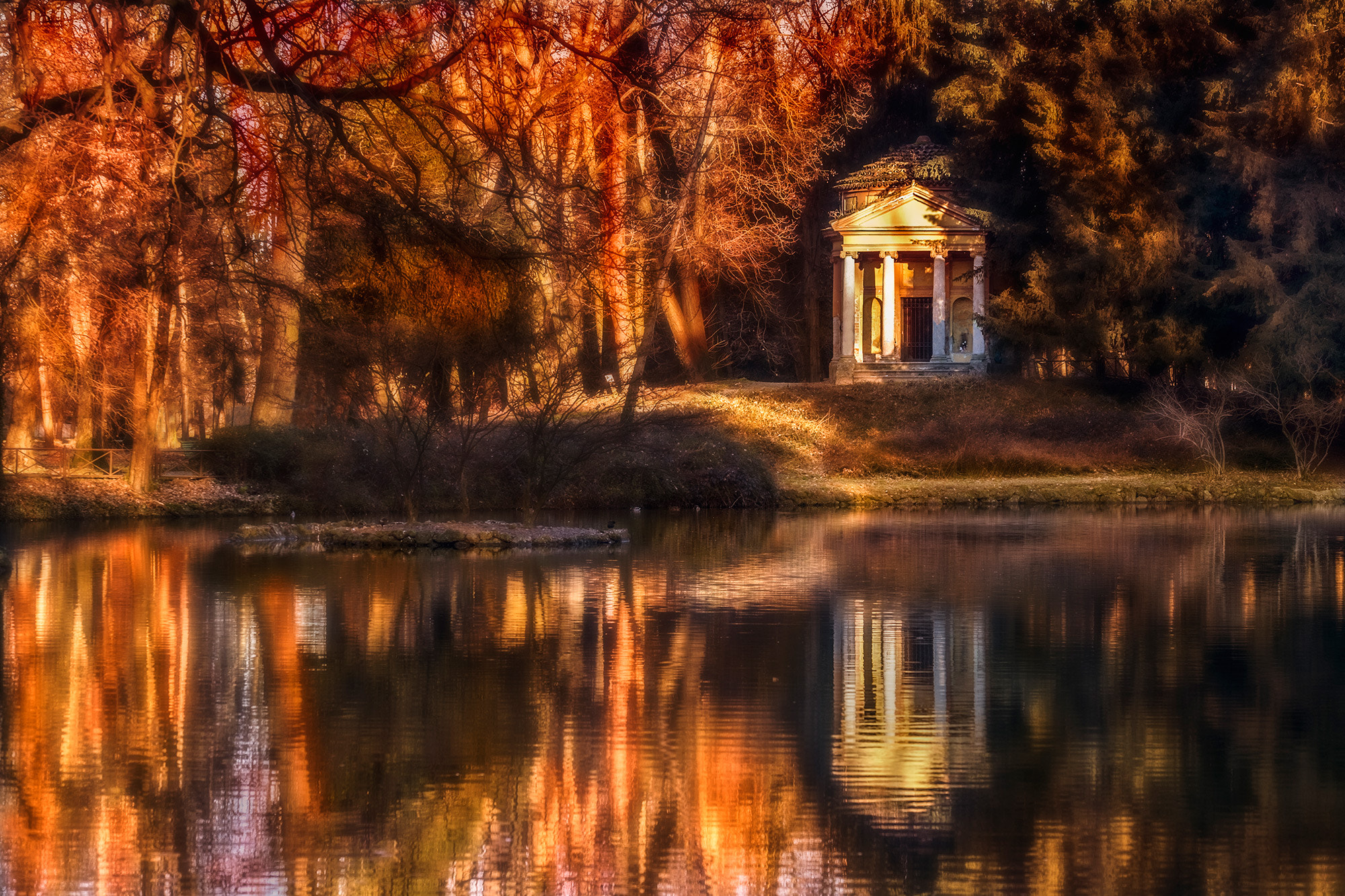
The Royal Gardens in autumn

Monza has a humid subtropical climate (Köppen classification Cfa), typical of the central Po Valley. The climate is influenced by continental conditions, limited air circulation and proximity to the Alps.

Winters are relatively cold, with frequent fog and temperature inversions, although these phenomena have decreased in recent decades due to urbanisation. Average temperatures in January are around 2 °C (36 °F).

Summers are warm and humid, with average temperatures around 23 °C (73 °F) in July. Heatwaves can occur, and thunderstorms are common during summer months.

Precipitation is distributed throughout the year, with peaks in spring and autumn. Annual rainfall is consistent with values typical of the central Po Valley. Air stagnation conditions may contribute to elevated pollution levels during certain periods.

Climate data for Monza (reference: Milan Linate)
| Month | Jan | Feb | Mar | Apr | May | Jun | Jul | Aug | Sep | Oct | Nov | Dec | Year |
|---|---|---|---|---|---|---|---|---|---|---|---|---|---|
| Mean daily maximum °C (°F) | 6.1 (43.0) | 7.8 (46.0) | 13.1 (55.6) | 17.8 (64.0) | 22.1 (71.8) | 25.9 (78.6) | 28.5 (83.3) | 27.2 (81.0) | 23.6 (74.5) | 17.1 (62.8) | 10.7 (51.3) | 6.1 (43.0) | 17.2 (62.9) |
| Mean daily minimum °C (°F) | 0.2 (32.4) | 0.5 (32.9) | 3.9 (39.0) | 7.6 (45.7) | 11.6 (52.9) | 15.3 (59.5) | 17.6 (63.7) | 17.0 (62.6) | 14.1 (57.4) | 9.0 (48.2) | 4.1 (39.4) | 0.2 (32.4) | 8.4 (47.2) |
| Average precipitation mm (inches) | 60 (2.4) | 61 (2.4) | 77 (3.0) | 93 (3.7) | 101 (4.0) | 101 (4.0) | 75 (3.0) | 96 (3.8) | 87 (3.4) | 116 (4.6) | 108 (4.3) | 69 (2.7) | 1,044 (41.3) |
Source: Italian Air Force Meteorological Service (1971–2000)

=== Parks and green areas ===
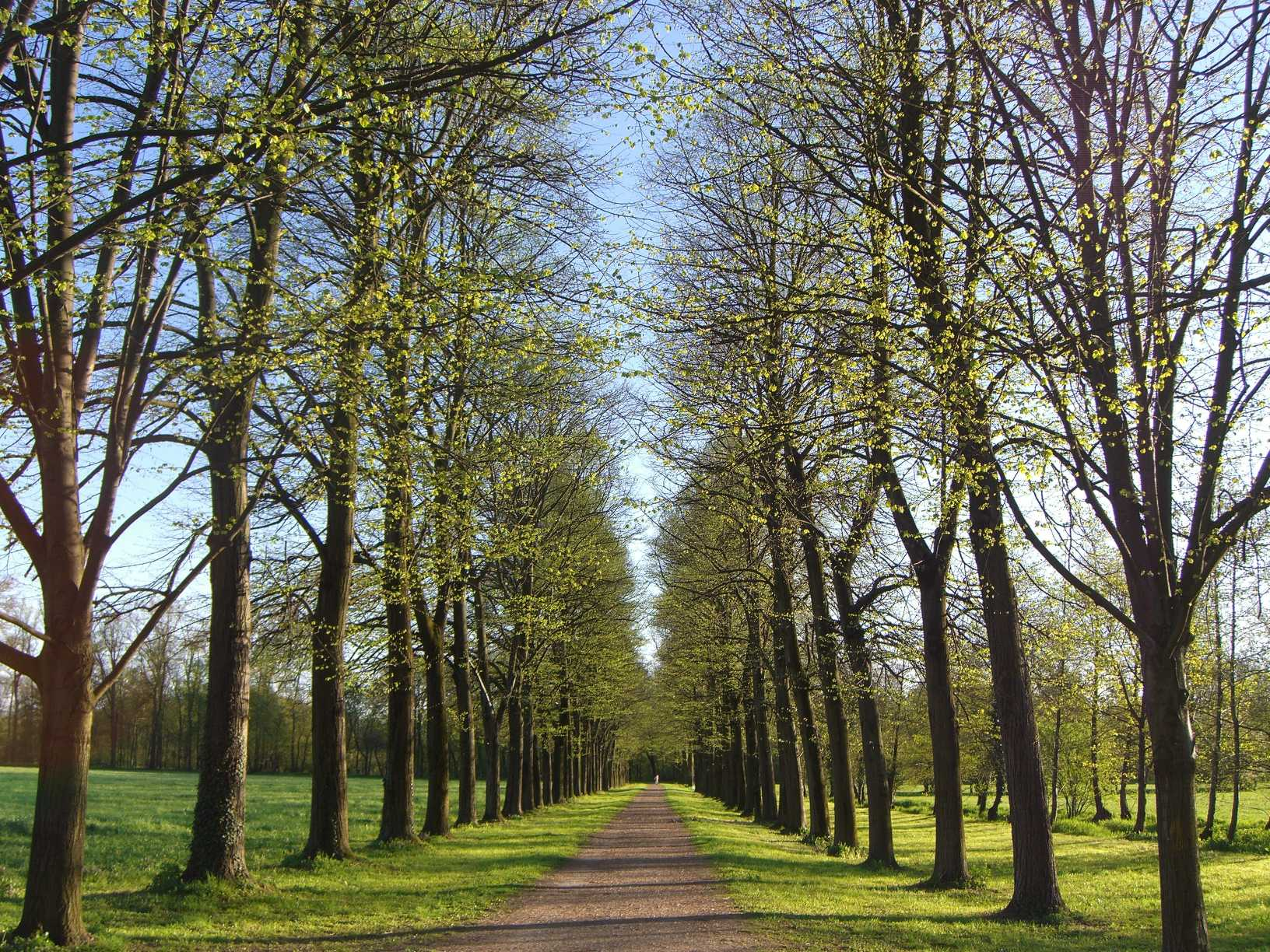
Aerial view of Monza Park

The principal green area is Monza Park, which covers approximately 685 hectares (1,690 acres) and is among the largest enclosed urban parks in Europe. The park extends north of the city and includes woodland, agricultural areas, historic villas and sports facilities.

Originally established during the Napoleonic period as part of the Royal Villa complex, the park later became a public recreational area. It includes the Autodromo Nazionale di Monza and historic buildings such as Villa Mirabello and Villa Mirabellino.

The Royal Gardens of Monza are located adjacent to the Royal Villa of Monza and represent a formal landscaped area designed in the late 18th century. These gardens include ornamental features, water elements and botanical collections.

Additional green areas within the municipality include urban parks, tree-lined avenues and smaller public gardens, contributing to environmental quality within a densely urbanised area.

== Demographics ==
Historical population
| Year | Pop. | ±% |
|---|---|---|
| 1861 | 24,499 | — |
| 1871 | 25,266 | +3.1% |
| 1881 | 26,807 | +6.1% |
| 1901 | 41,218 | +53.8% |
| 1911 | 51,655 | +25.3% |
| 1921 | 54,617 | +5.7% |
| 1931 | 61,516 | +12.6% |
| 1936 | 65,052 | +5.7% |
| 1951 | 73,114 | +12.4% |
| 1961 | 84,445 | +15.5% |
| 1971 | 114,327 | +35.4% |
| 1981 | 123,145 | +7.7% |
| 1991 | 120,651 | −2.0% |
| 2001 | 120,204 | −0.4% |
| 2011 | 119,856 | −0.3% |
| 2021 | 121,984 | +1.8% |
Source: ISTAT

As of 2026, the population is 123,672, of which 48.3% are male, and 51.7% are female. Minors make up 14.7% of the population, and seniors make up 25.3%.

The demographic development of Monza reflects the broader economic and urban transformations of northern Italy. During the 19th century, population growth remained moderate and was primarily linked to agricultural activity and early artisanal production. A significant increase began in the late 19th and early 20th centuries, corresponding to the expansion of industrial activity and improved transport connections with Milan.

The most substantial phase of growth occurred between the 1950s and the 1970s, when Monza experienced rapid urbanisation as part of the wider industrial expansion of the Lombardy region. This period was characterised by strong internal migration, particularly from rural areas of southern and north-eastern Italy, contributing to the expansion of residential districts and the integration of Monza into the Milan metropolitan system.

Population growth slowed from the 1980s onward, with levels stabilising at around 120,000 inhabitants. This trend reflects broader demographic patterns observed in northern Italian urban areas, including suburbanisation, declining birth rates and changes in household composition.

=== Metropolitan context ===
Monza is part of the Milan metropolitan area, one of the largest urban regions in Europe. The continuous urban area extends beyond municipal boundaries, forming a densely interconnected system of cities and towns.

A significant proportion of the resident population participates in daily commuting flows between Monza and Milan, influencing demographic patterns, employment distribution and urban development.

=== Immigration ===
Foreign population by country of birth (2025)
| Country of birth | Population |
|---|---|
| Egypt | 1,634 |
| Peru | 1,404 |
| Albania | 1,262 |
| Romania | 1,255 |
| Bangladesh | 1,201 |
| Ukraine | 1,201 |
| Ecuador | 874 |
| Sri Lanka | 855 |
| Morocco | 660 |
| Moldova | 636 |
| Brazil | 551 |
| Philippines | 511 |
| China | 459 |
| Russia | 373 |
| France | 296 |

As of 2025, immigrants make up 15.3% of the total population. The 5 largest foreign countries of birth are Egypt, Peru, Albania, Romania, and Bangladesh.

Immigration to Monza has developed primarily since the late 20th century and is associated with labour demand in manufacturing, construction, services and domestic work. Foreign residents contribute significantly to the working-age population and to demographic renewal.

This pattern follows broader trends in northern Italy, where immigration has partly offset population ageing and labour shortages.

=== Religion ===
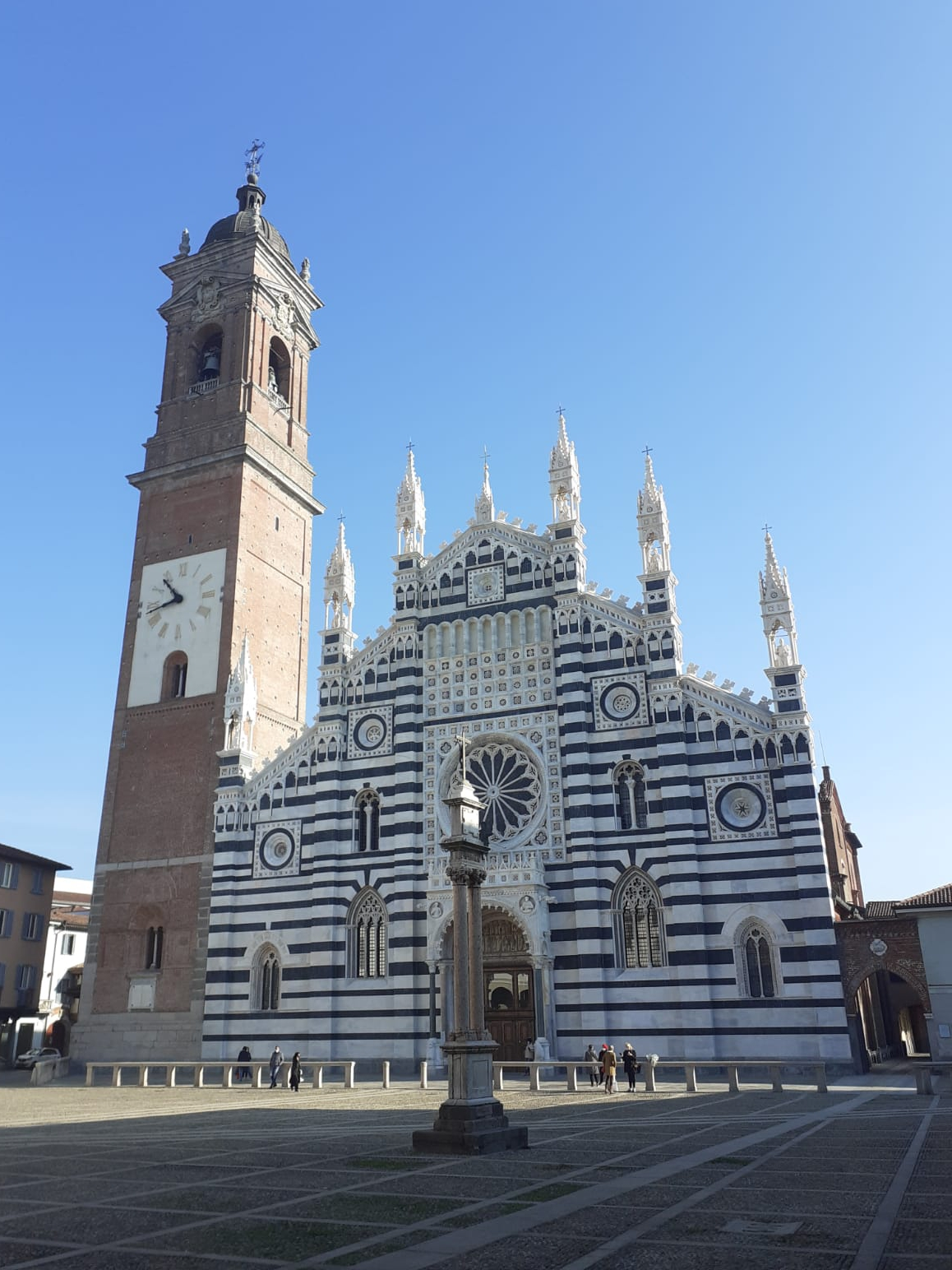
Monza Cathedral

The population of Monza is predominantly affiliated with the Catholic Church, reflecting the historical religious structure of Italy. The city is part of the Roman Catholic Archdiocese of Milan, one of the largest dioceses in Europe.

In addition to the Catholic majority, Monza hosts communities belonging to other Christian denominations, as well as Muslim, Orthodox, Hindu and Buddhist groups. These communities are linked primarily to migration patterns in recent decades.

Religious diversity is reflected in the presence of different places of worship within the city and the surrounding metropolitan area.

== Government ==
=== Municipal administration ===
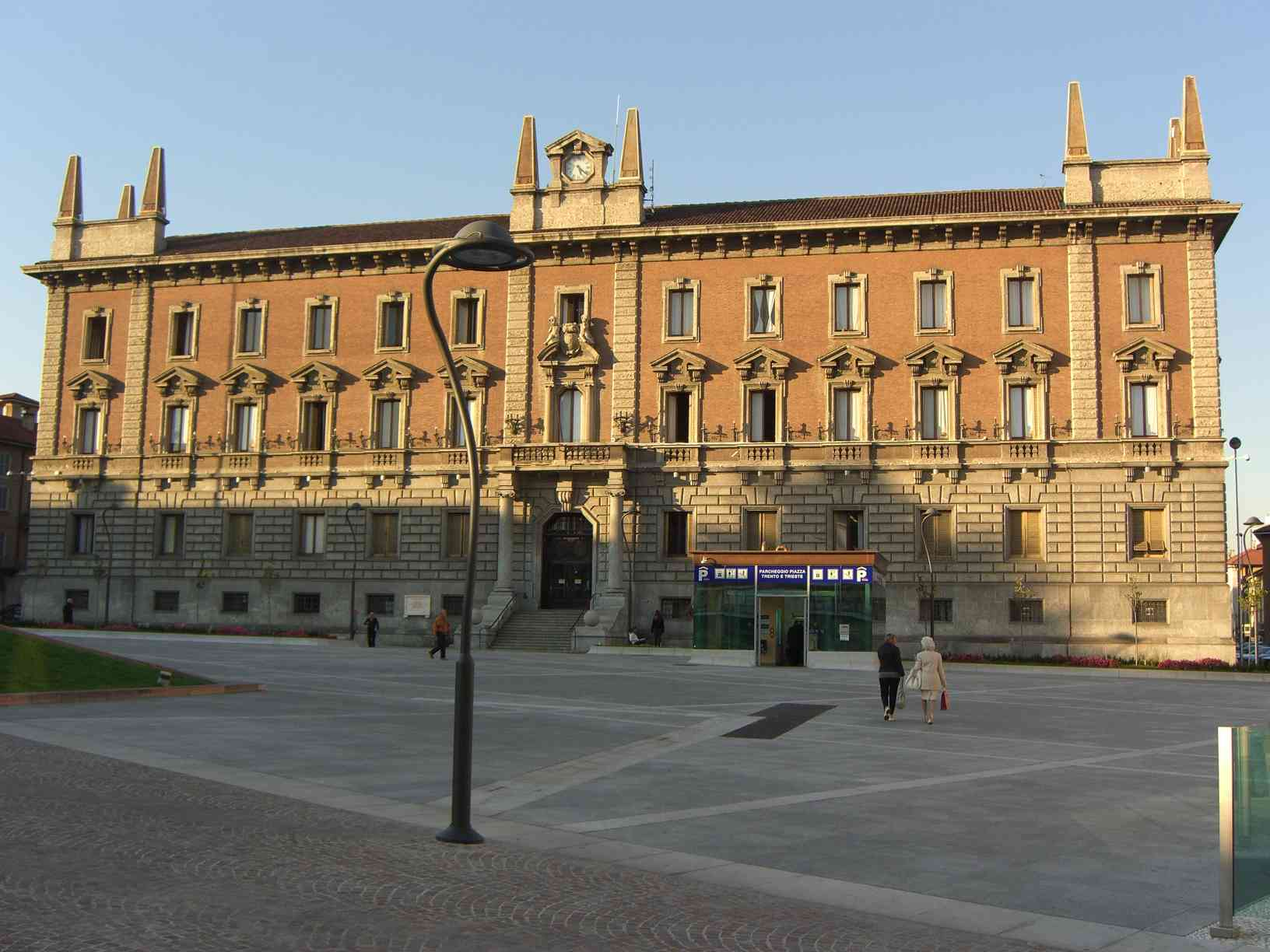
Piazza Trento e Trieste, seat of municipal institutions

Monza is administered as a comune within the Italian system of local government. Municipal administration is exercised by a mayor (sindaco), an executive committee (giunta comunale) and a city council (consiglio comunale), all elected by universal suffrage.

The mayor is responsible for the executive functions of the municipality, including the implementation of policies, coordination of municipal departments and representation of the city. The city council exercises legislative and oversight functions, approving budgets, urban plans and local regulations.

The current mayor is Paolo Pilotto, elected in 2022. His administration operates within the framework of Italian municipal law, which defines the competences of local authorities in areas such as urban planning, public services, transport, education and social welfare.

=== Administrative subdivisions ===
The municipal territory of Monza is divided into five administrative districts (circoscrizioni), which correspond to groupings of neighbourhoods and are used for decentralised administrative functions and local participation.

These districts include:

- District 1 – Centro, San Gerardo, Libertà
- District 2 – Cederna, Sant'Albino, Regina Pacis, Sant'Ambrogio
- District 3 – San Rocco, Sant'Alessandro
- District 4 – San Giuseppe, San Carlo, Triante, San Fruttuoso
- District 5 – San Biagio, Cazzaniga

The districts do not possess autonomous legislative authority but serve as administrative units for local services, citizen engagement and territorial organisation.

=== Provincial role ===
Monza has been the capital of the Province of Monza and Brianza since its establishment in 2004. The province became fully operational in 2009 following administrative reorganisation within the Lombardy region.

As provincial capital, Monza hosts administrative offices and public institutions serving the surrounding territory. The province forms part of the wider Lombardy regional system and is closely connected to the Milan metropolitan area, both economically and institutionally.

=== Symbols and honours ===
The official symbols of Monza include the coat of arms, the civic banner and the municipal flag.

The coat of arms features the Iron Crown of Lombardy and the Cross of Berengar on a blue shield, surrounded by decorative elements including oak and olive branches. The Latin inscription Est Sedes Italiae Regni Modœtia Magni reflects historical associations with the Kingdom of Italy.

The municipal flag consists of two horizontal bands, red and white, with the coat of arms at the centre.

Monza has received official recognitions, including the formal title of city granted in the 19th century and honours related to civic merit, such as awards for public service during national emergencies.

== Urbanism ==
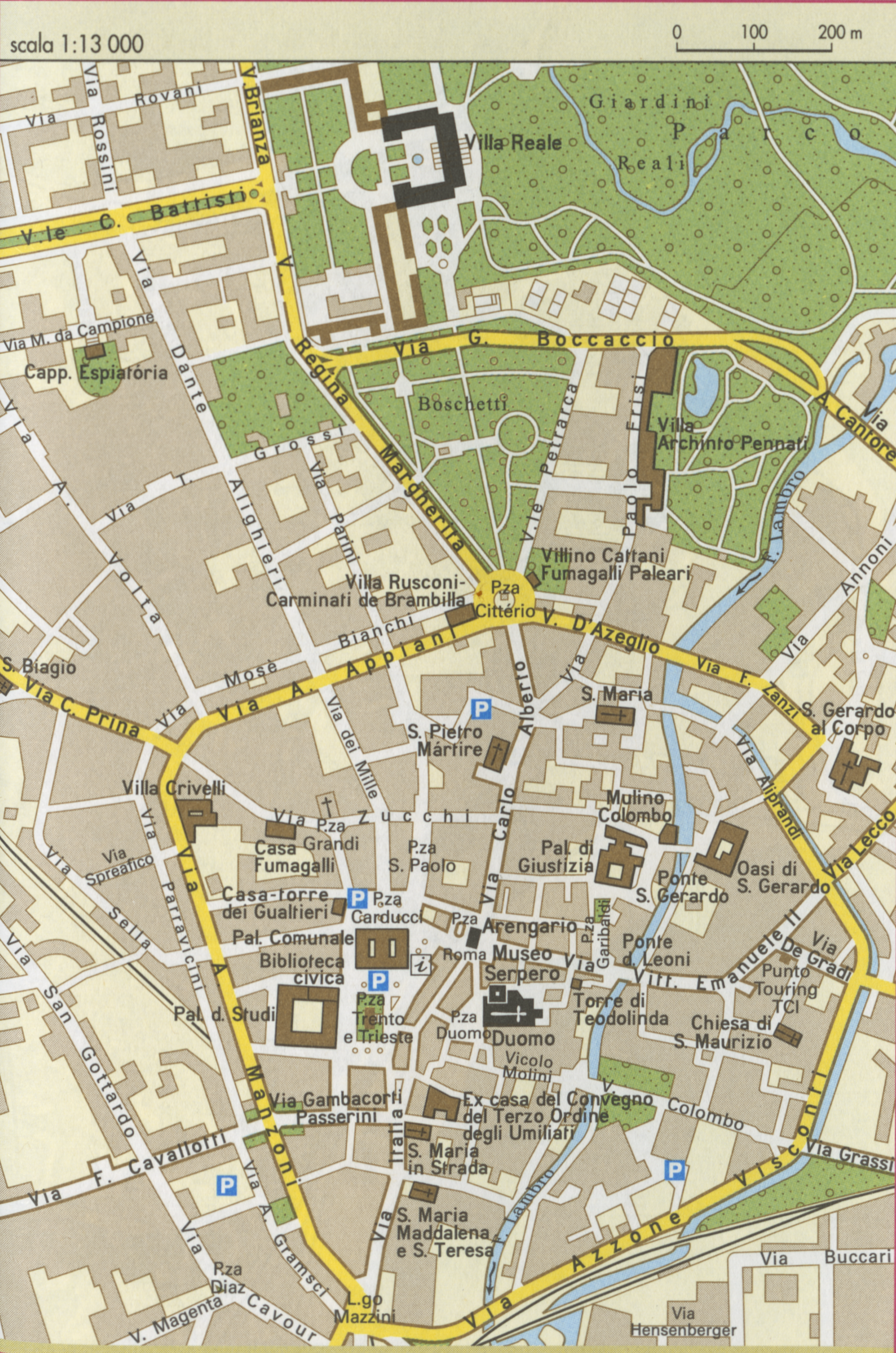
Map of city centre

The urban structure of Monza reflects a long process of historical stratification, from its Roman origins through its development as a Lombard royal centre, medieval commune, ducal town and modern urban settlement within the Milan metropolitan area.

The historic core is organised around the Cathedral, the Arengario and Piazza Trento e Trieste, corresponding to the medieval pratum magnum. The Lambro River runs through the centre, influencing both the morphology of the urban fabric and the location of early settlements, infrastructure and productive activities.

Subsequent phases of expansion, particularly from the 19th century onward, extended the city beyond its medieval boundaries, integrating surrounding rural areas into a continuous built environment connected with the wider Milan metropolitan system.

=== Historic centre ===
The historic centre preserves elements of medieval urban morphology, including irregular street patterns, narrow roads and spatial organisation linked to former defensive structures and watercourses.

The Arengario, built in the 13th century, served as the seat of civic administration and remains one of the principal symbols of municipal identity.

The area around Via Lambro and Piazza Duomo represents one of the oldest parts of the city, corresponding to the early medieval settlement associated with Lombard royal presence.

=== Religious architecture ===
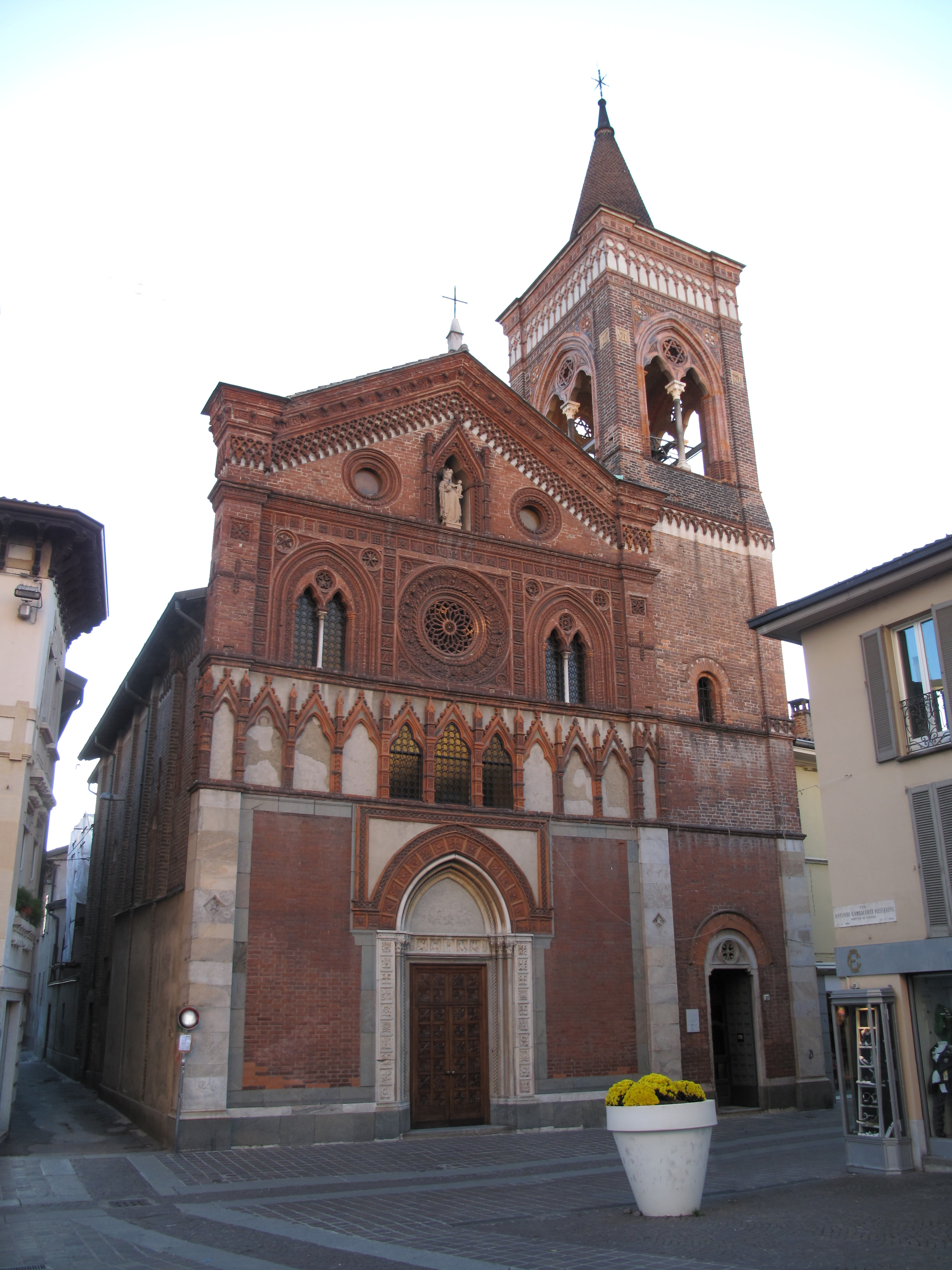
Church of Santa Maria in Strada

Religious architecture in Monza spans from the early Middle Ages to the modern period.

The Monza Cathedral (Duomo di Monza) is the most significant religious structure, originally founded in the 6th century and rebuilt in Gothic form from the late 13th century. It houses the Iron Crown and the Chapel of Theodelinda, decorated with a cycle of frescoes by the Zavattari workshop.

Other religious buildings include Santa Maria in Strada, San Pietro Martire, Santa Maria delle Grazie and Santa Maria al Carrobiolo. These structures illustrate stylistic transitions from Romanesque and Gothic forms to later architectural developments.

=== Civil architecture ===
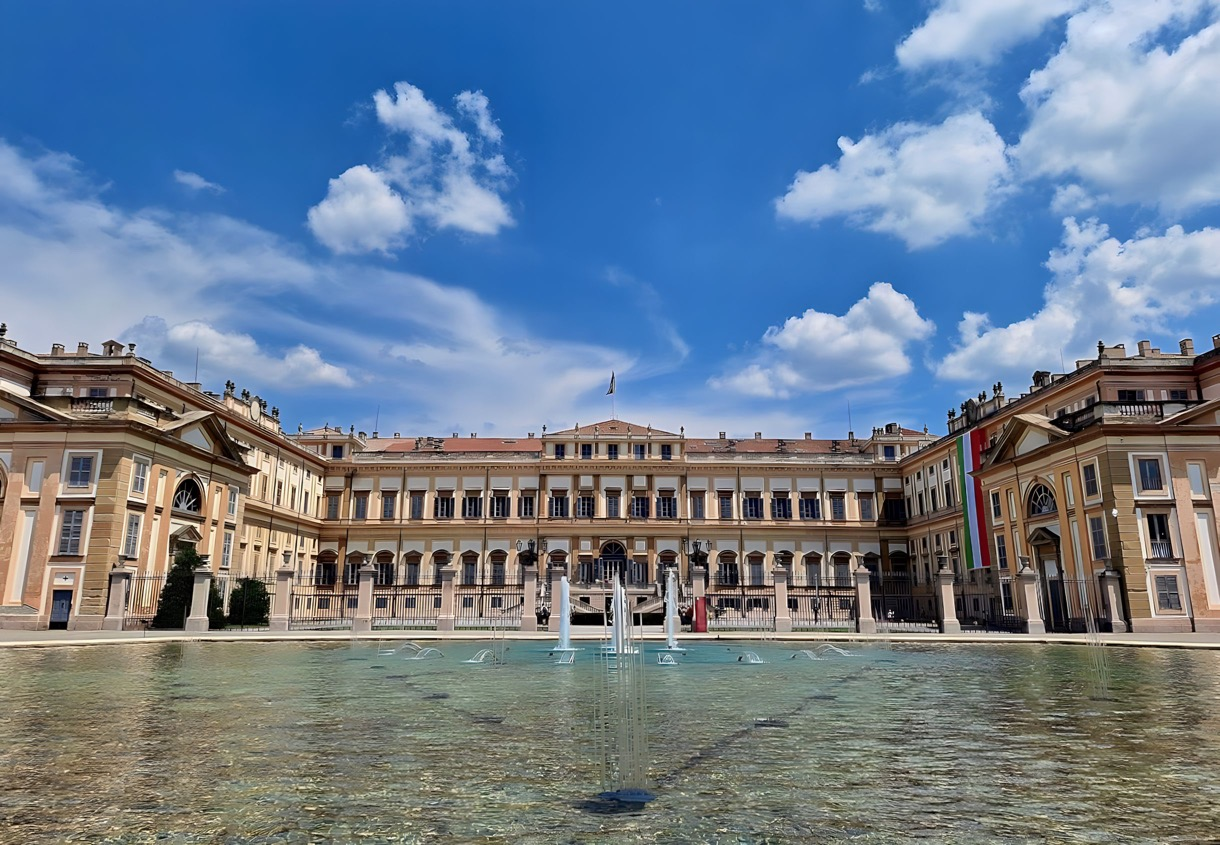
Royal Villa of Monza

Civil architecture includes medieval civic buildings, aristocratic residences and modern administrative structures.

The Royal Villa of Monza, constructed between 1777 and 1780, represents the most important example of neoclassical architecture in the city. Designed by Giuseppe Piermarini, it formed part of a broader Habsburg strategy of territorial representation.

Other civil buildings include historic palaces, institutional structures and residential developments reflecting the evolution of the city from the 19th century onward.

=== Royal Villa and Royal Gardens ===
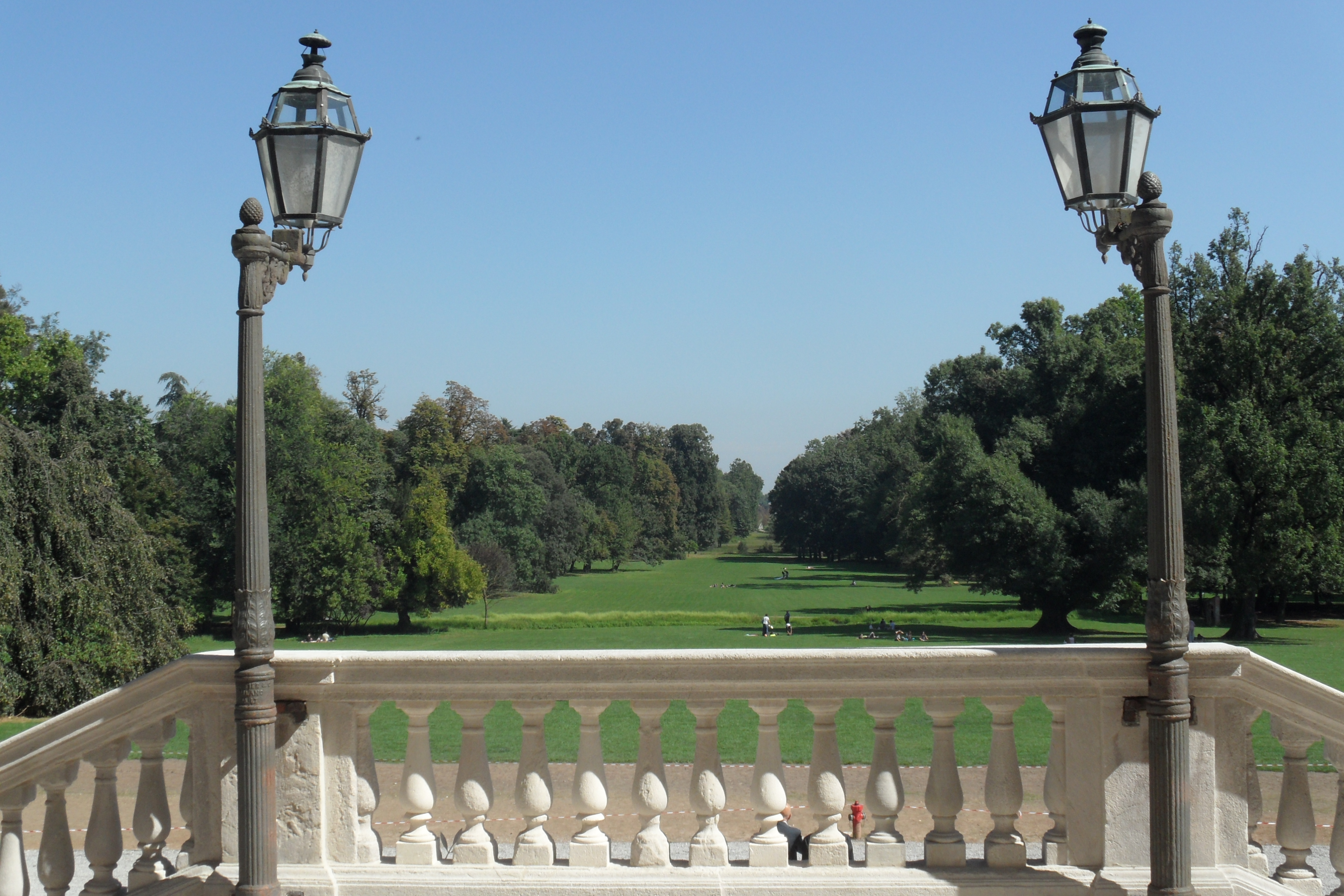
Royal Gardens of Monza

The Royal Gardens form part of the villa complex and are characterised by formal landscaping, water features and botanical design elements typical of late 18th-century planning.

=== Monza Park ===
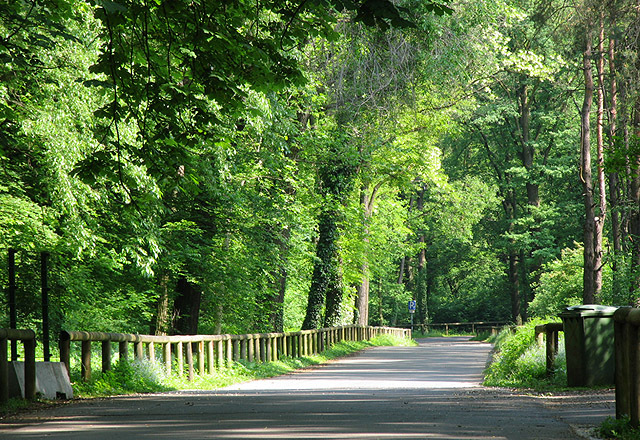
Monza Park

Monza Park, covering approximately 685 hectares (1,690 acres), constitutes one of the largest enclosed parks in Europe.

It includes woodland, agricultural land, historical villas and sports facilities, including the Autodromo Nazionale di Monza. The park reflects early 19th-century landscape planning associated with Napoleonic and later Austrian administration.

=== Bridges and waterways ===
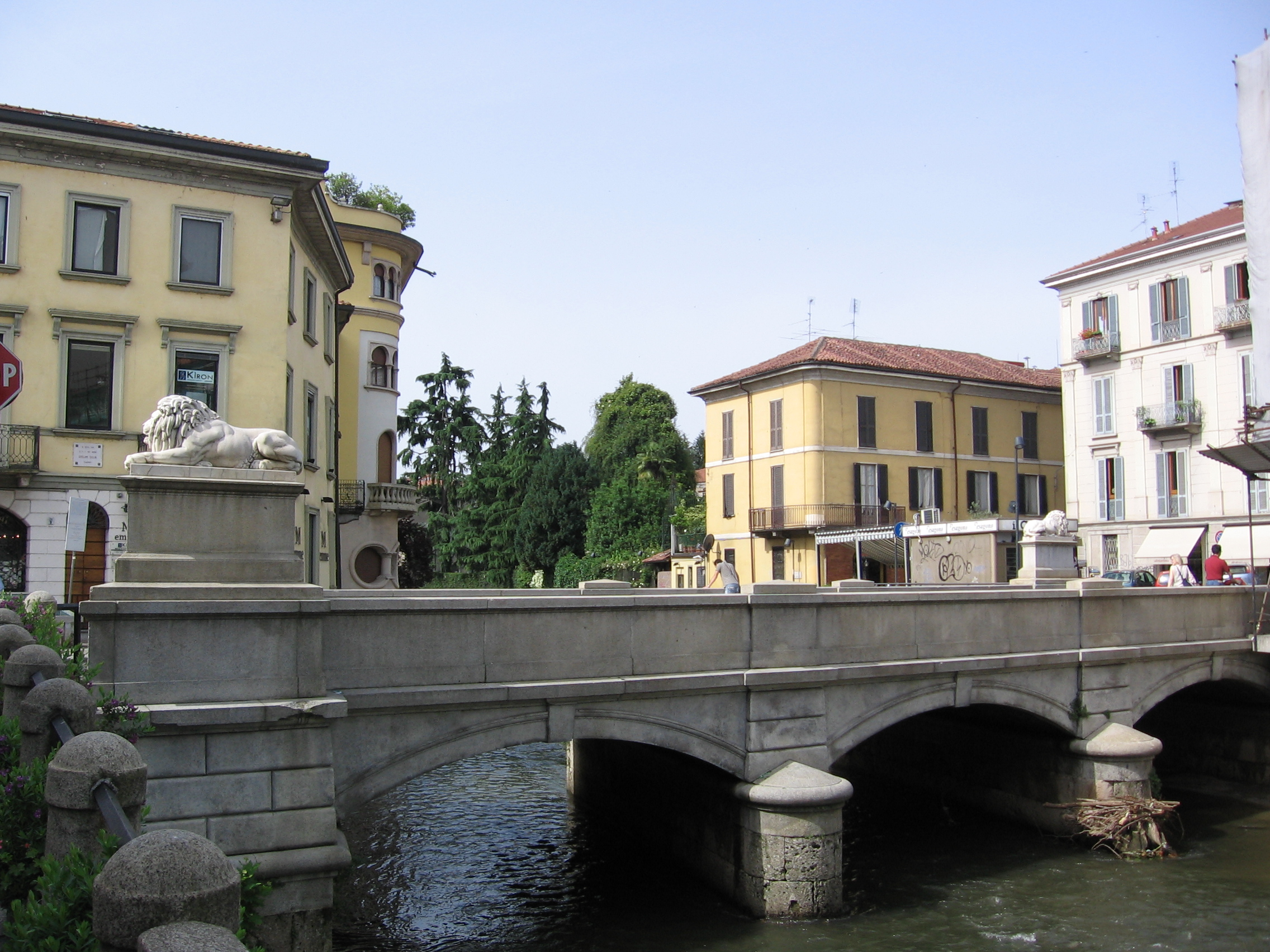
Ponte dei Leoni

The urban landscape includes several bridges crossing the Lambro River.

The Ponte dei Leoni, constructed in 1842, replaced the earlier Roman Ponte d'Arena. Additional crossings include the Ponte di San Gerardino and other historical bridges linked to former city gates and hydraulic systems.

=== Military architecture and former fortifications ===
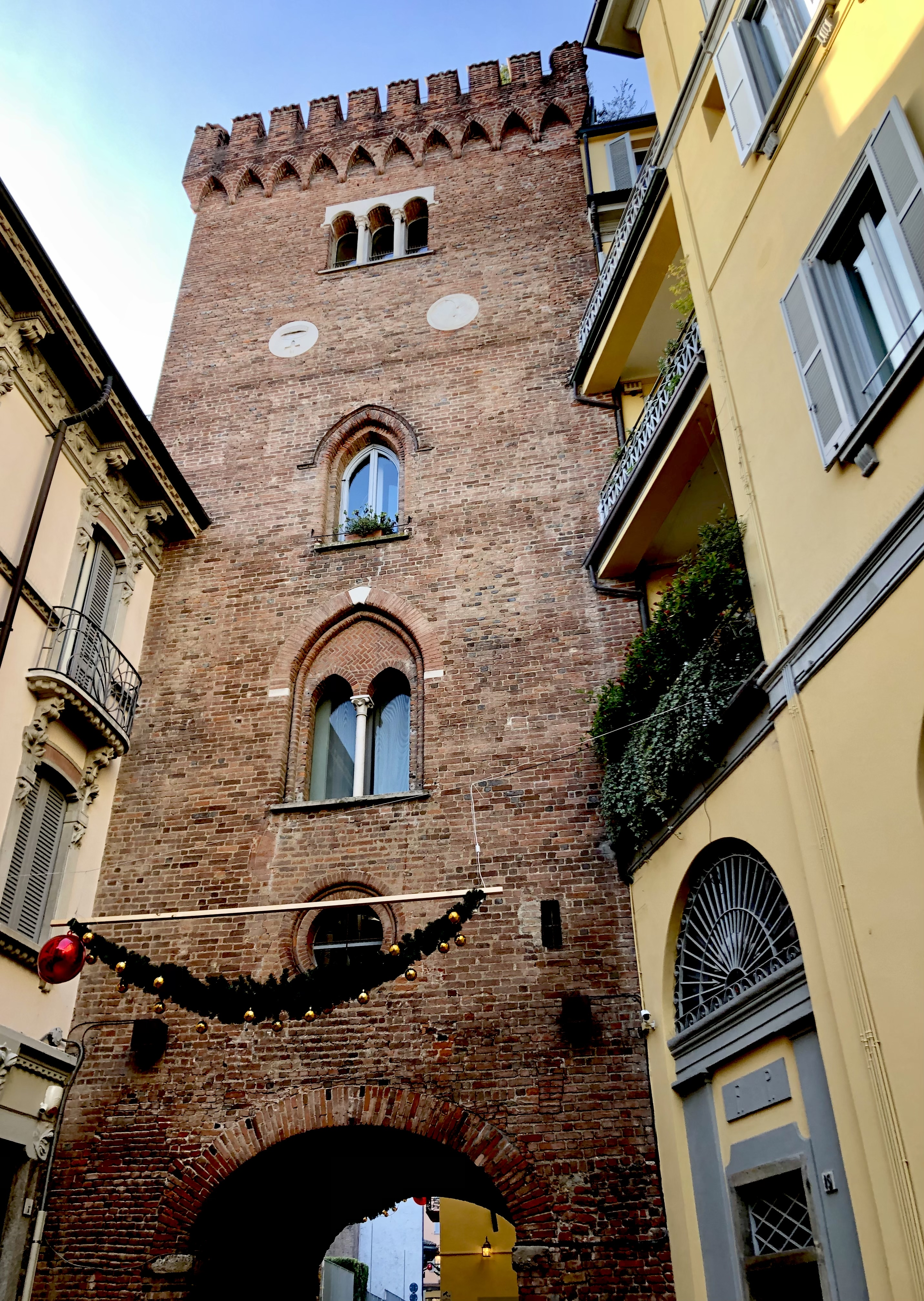
Medieval tower

Remains of historical fortifications include towers and fragments of defensive structures dating to the medieval and Visconti periods.

The Visconti castle, built in the 14th century, was demolished during the Napoleonic period, with only limited elements surviving.

=== Monuments and fountains ===
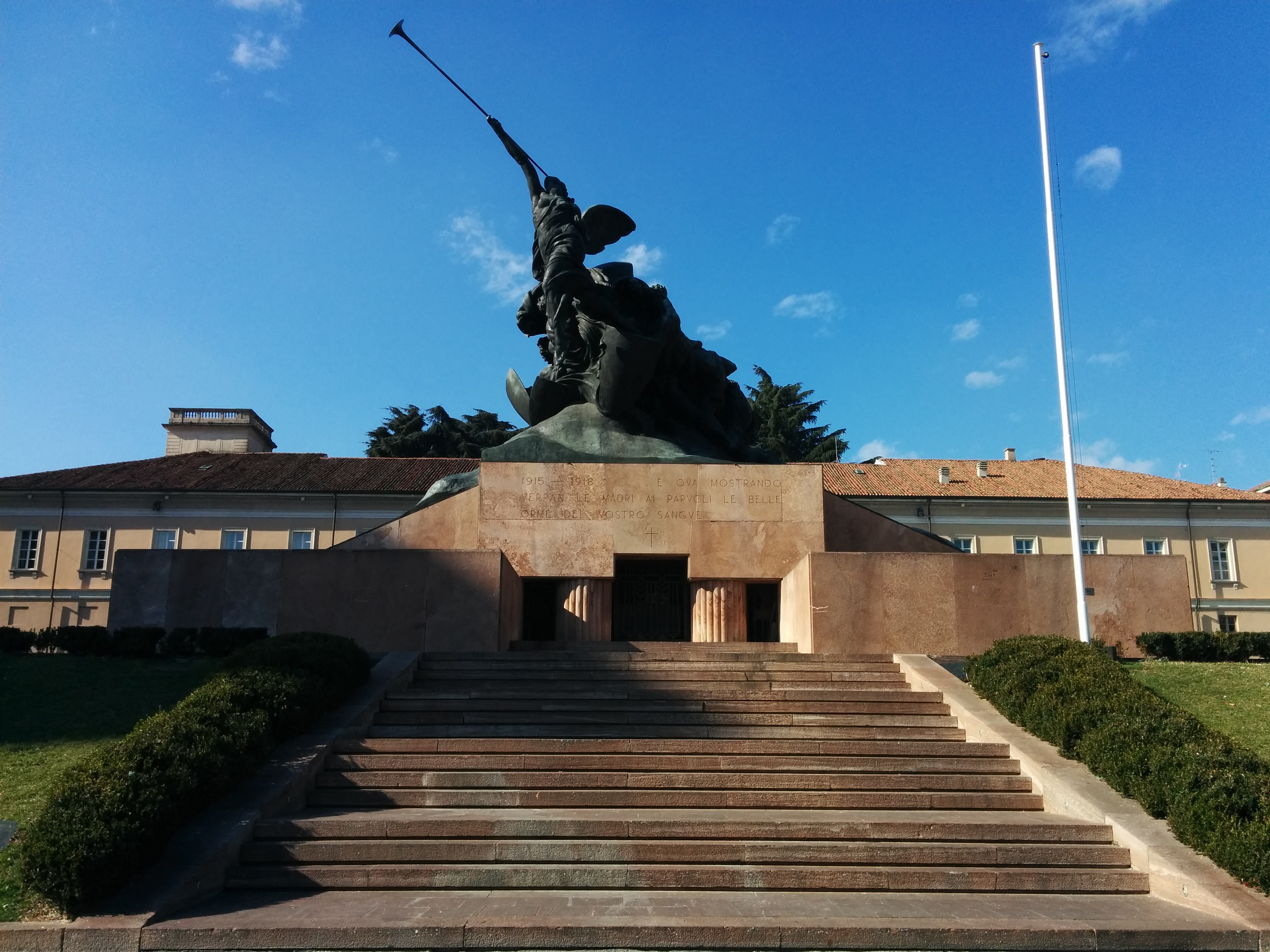
Monument to the Fallen

Public monuments commemorate national and local history, including the Monumento ai Caduti, dedicated to those who died in the World Wars.

=== Lost buildings ===
Several important historical structures, including the Lombard royal palace and the Visconti castle, no longer survive but are documented through archival and archaeological sources.

== Culture ==
The cultural life of Monza reflects its historical development as a Lombard religious centre, a ducal town linked to Milan, and a modern urban settlement within the Milan metropolitan area. Cultural institutions in the city include museums, archives, theatres, libraries and local media, as well as recurring events connected with both civic and religious traditions.

=== Museums ===
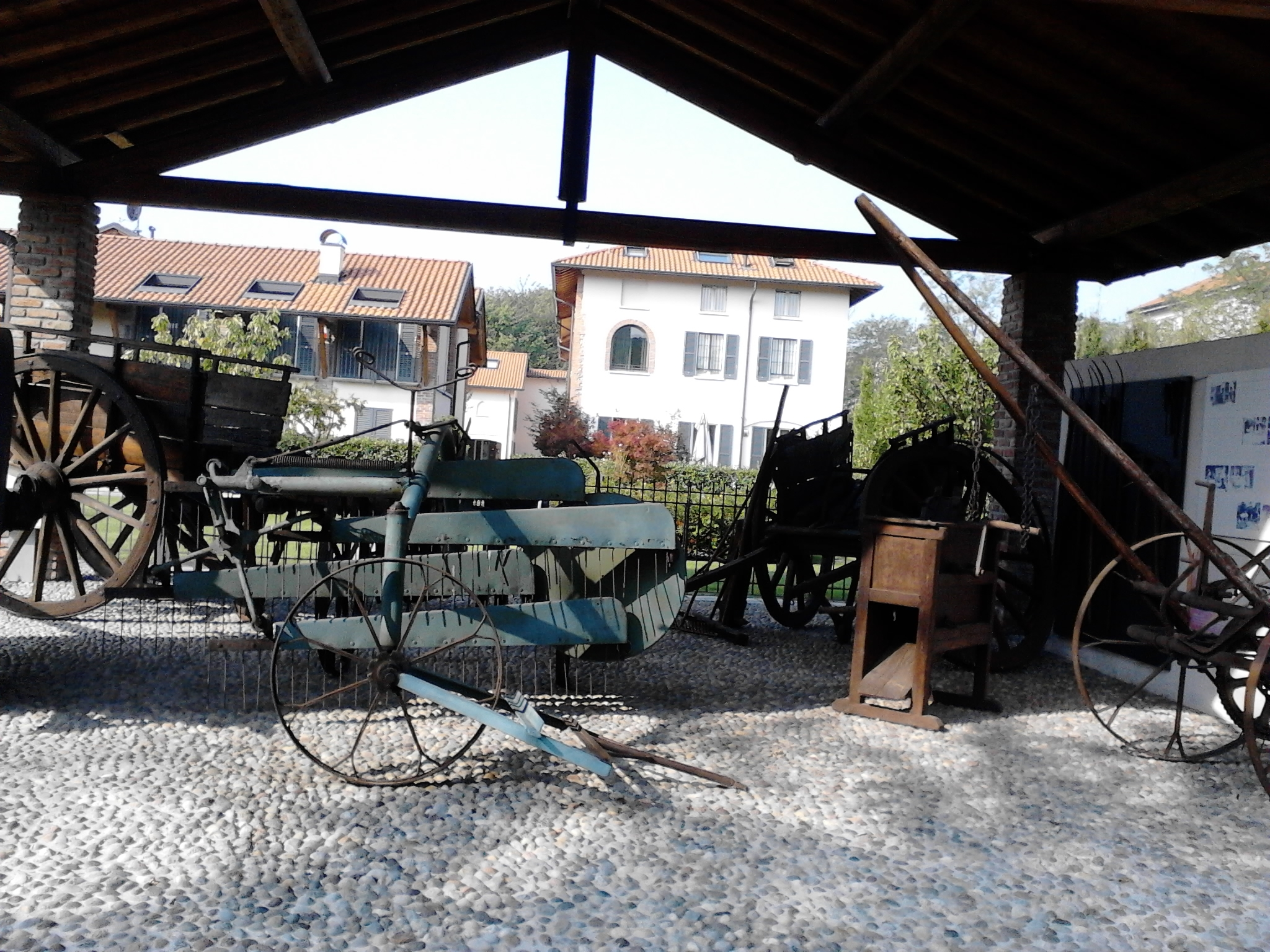
Museum of Rural Civilisation

Monza hosts several museums of historical and artistic relevance, many of which are connected to its medieval and Lombard heritage.

The Museum and Treasury of Monza Cathedral (Museo e Tesoro del Duomo di Monza) preserves one of the most important collections of early medieval liturgical objects in Italy. Its holdings include the Iron Crown of Lombardy, the so-called Hen with Chicks (a Lombard gold artefact), the Cross of Agilulf and the Evangelary traditionally associated with Queen Theodelinda.

The Civic Museums of Monza (Musei Civici) are located in the Casa degli Umiliati complex and include collections of paintings, sculptures and archaeological materials documenting the history of the city from antiquity to the modern period.

The Ethnological Museum of Monza and Brianza (MEMB) focuses on rural culture and traditional life in the Brianza area, with collections relating to agriculture, craftsmanship and domestic life.

Additional cultural sites include the Mulino Colombo, a restored historical mill used for exhibitions, and smaller thematic collections related to local history.

=== Libraries and archives ===
The library system of Monza forms part of the BrianzaBiblioteche network, which coordinates public libraries across the province.

The Civic Library of Monza, located in the former seminary building (Palazzo degli Studi), serves as the principal public library and archive. It includes historical collections, manuscripts and local documentation.

The Capitular Library of Monza Cathedral preserves medieval manuscripts and documents connected with the cathedral chapter and ecclesiastical administration.

=== Media ===
Local media in Monza include newspapers, digital platforms and regional editions of national publications.

The weekly newspaper Il Cittadino di Monza e della Brianza, founded in 1899, remains one of the main local information sources.

Online platforms such as MonzaToday and regional editions of Il Giorno provide digital coverage of news, culture and local events.

=== Theatre and music ===
Monza hosts several theatres and performance spaces.

The Teatro Manzoni is the principal theatre venue, hosting plays, concerts and cultural events. The Teatro Villoresi and Binario 7 provide additional spaces for theatre productions, contemporary performance and cultural programming.

Music activities include choral groups such as the Coro Anthem and various local ensembles.

=== Events and traditions ===
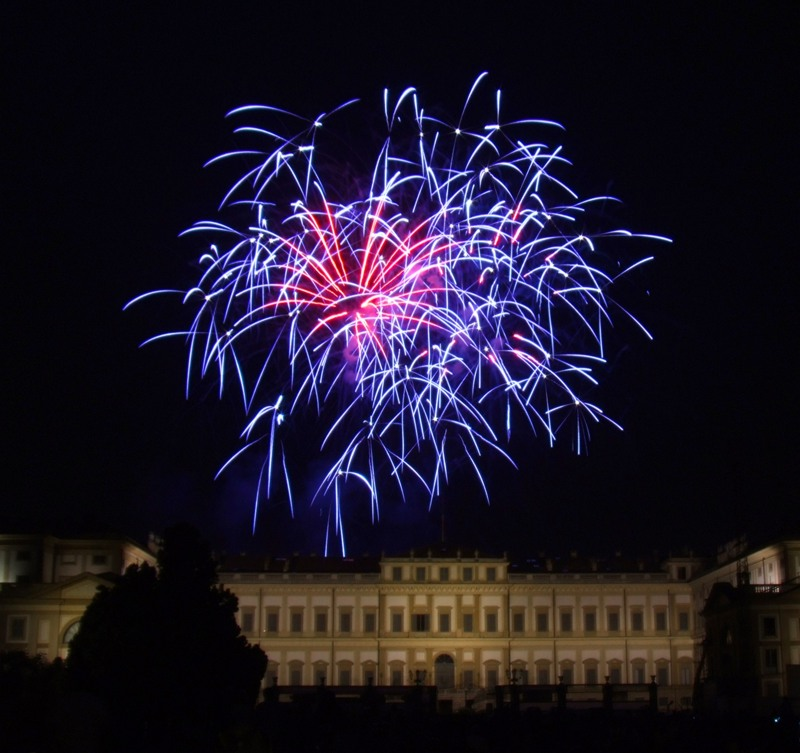
Fireworks at the Royal Villa

The most prominent event in Monza is the Italian Grand Prix, held annually at the Autodromo Nazionale di Monza. The event is part of the Formula One World Championship and attracts international audiences.

Traditional events include the Feast of Saint Gerardo dei Tintori (6 June), which commemorates one of the city's patron saints, and religious processions associated with the cathedral.

From 1965 to 2015, the International Rose Competition was held in the Roseto Niso Fumagalli within the Royal Gardens, recognised by the World Federation of Rose Societies.

=== Cuisine ===
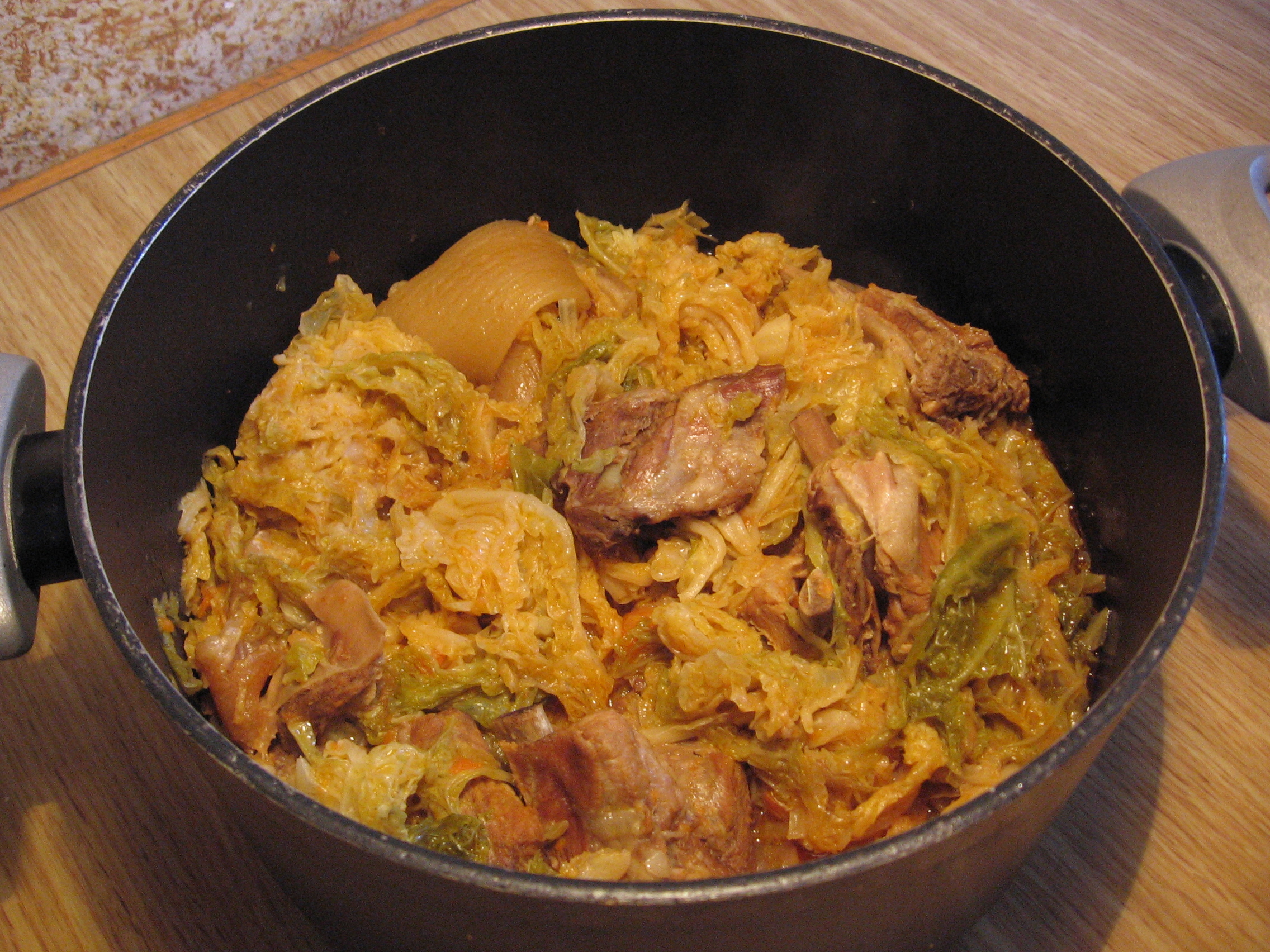
Cassoeula

The cuisine of Monza is part of the broader culinary tradition of Lombardy and Brianza.

Typical dishes include:

- cassoeula – a winter dish based on pork and cabbage
- risotto with luganega – rice with local sausage
- buseca – tripe-based dish

These dishes reflect rural and seasonal culinary traditions based on meat, rice and local agricultural products.

== Economy ==
The economy of Monza is closely integrated with that of the Brianza district and the wider Milan metropolitan area, forming part of one of the most industrialised regions of Italy.

Historically, the local economy developed from agriculture and small-scale craft production into a diversified industrial system during the 19th and 20th centuries. The presence of water resources, transport infrastructure and proximity to Milan contributed to this transformation.

=== Industrial development ===
During the late 19th century, Monza became an important industrial centre within Lombardy. Key sectors included textiles, mechanical engineering and hat manufacturing. The hat industry, in particular, expanded significantly and employed a large share of the local workforce, supplying both domestic and international markets.

Industrial growth continued into the early 20th century, with the development of cotton processing, metalworking and electrical industries. By the interwar period, Monza was included among the industrial centres of northern Italy.

Following the Second World War, industrial activity expanded further as part of the broader economic growth of northern Italy. However, from the late 20th century, traditional sectors such as hat manufacturing declined, while production became more specialised and diversified.

=== Contemporary economic structure ===
In the present period, the economy of Monza is characterised by a mix of manufacturing and service activities. Small and medium-sized enterprises play a central role, reflecting the economic structure typical of the Brianza area.

Manufacturing remains relevant, particularly in mechanical engineering, precision production and industrial components. At the same time, the service sector has expanded significantly, including finance, commerce, logistics, healthcare, education and professional services.

The presence of major healthcare and academic institutions contributes to the local economy. The San Gerardo Hospital is one of the principal healthcare centres in Lombardy, while the University of Milano-Bicocca operates teaching and research facilities in the city.

=== Metropolitan integration ===
Monza is strongly integrated into the economic system of Milan. A significant proportion of residents commute daily between Monza and Milan for work and education. This integration affects labour markets, transport demand and the distribution of economic activities.

The city benefits from its position within a dense network of infrastructure, including railways, highways and regional services. The proximity to Milan also influences the development of tertiary activities and advanced services.

=== Income and productivity ===
The economic performance of Monza reflects that of the surrounding region. Lombardy is one of the leading regions in Italy in terms of gross domestic product and productivity.

Data on value added per capita indicate levels consistent with the regional average for Lombardy and above the national average.

=== Agriculture and craft activities ===
Although agriculture has declined in importance, it remains present in the surrounding territory, particularly in the production of cereals, forage and horticultural crops.

Traditional craft activities, including furniture production and small-scale manufacturing, continue in the wider Brianza area, where they are often integrated with industrial production systems.

=== Tourism and events ===
Tourism in Monza is linked primarily to cultural heritage, historical sites and international events. The Autodromo Nazionale di Monza hosts the Italian Grand Prix, attracting visitors from Italy and abroad.

Other attractions include the Royal Villa, Monza Park and the historic centre. Cultural and sporting events contribute to local economic activity, particularly in the hospitality and service sectors.

== Education and research ==
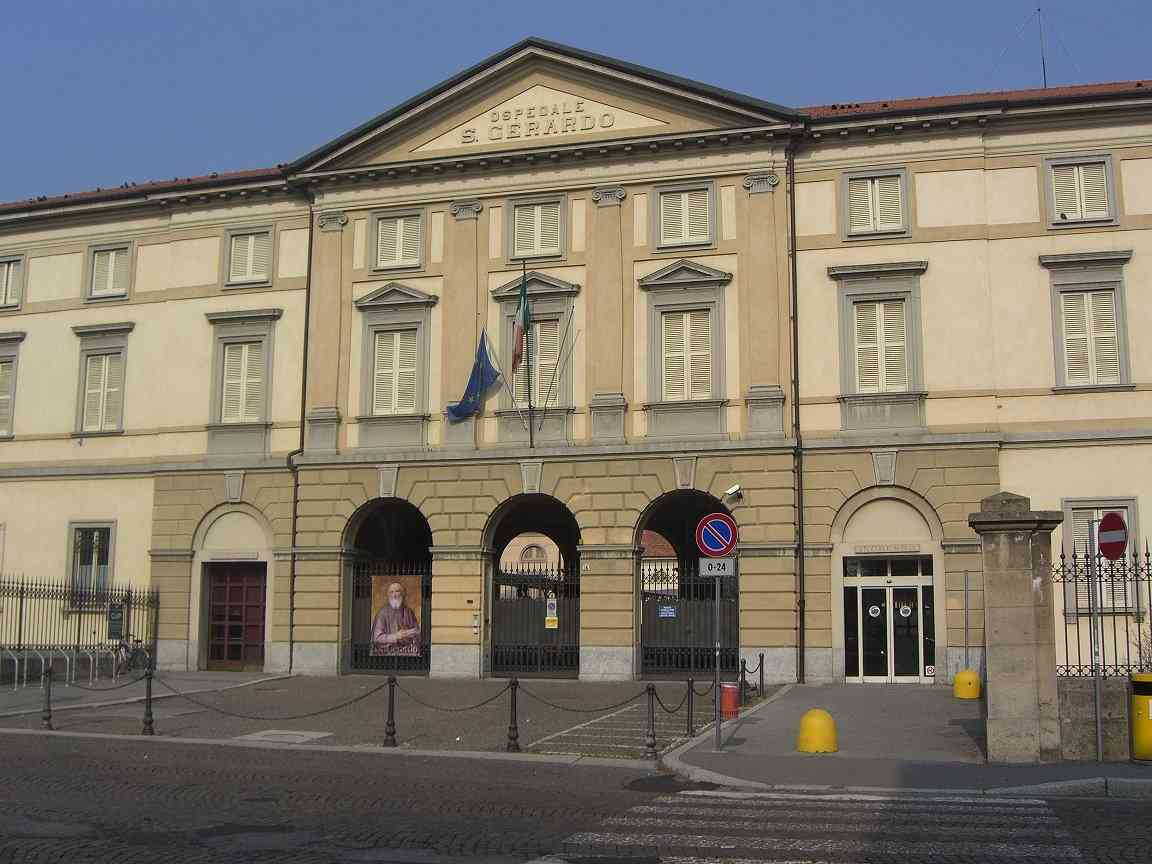
University of Milano-Bicocca facilities in Monza

Monza hosts a range of educational institutions at the secondary and tertiary levels and forms part of the wider academic system of the Milan metropolitan area.

The most significant higher education presence is represented by the University of Milano-Bicocca, which operates major teaching and research facilities in Monza, particularly in the fields of medicine, surgery and organisational sciences. The university campus is closely integrated with the healthcare system of the city, especially through its connection with San Gerardo Hospital.

Secondary education in Monza includes a network of public and private institutions, among which the Liceo Classico e Scientifico Bartolomeo Zucchi is one of the oldest and most prominent schools in the city.

Technical and vocational institutes also play an important role, reflecting the historical industrial base of the Brianza area, particularly in mechanical engineering, design and manufacturing.

Monza is also part of the broader research and innovation environment of Lombardy, benefiting from proximity to universities, research centres and industrial districts in Milan and Brianza.

== Healthcare ==
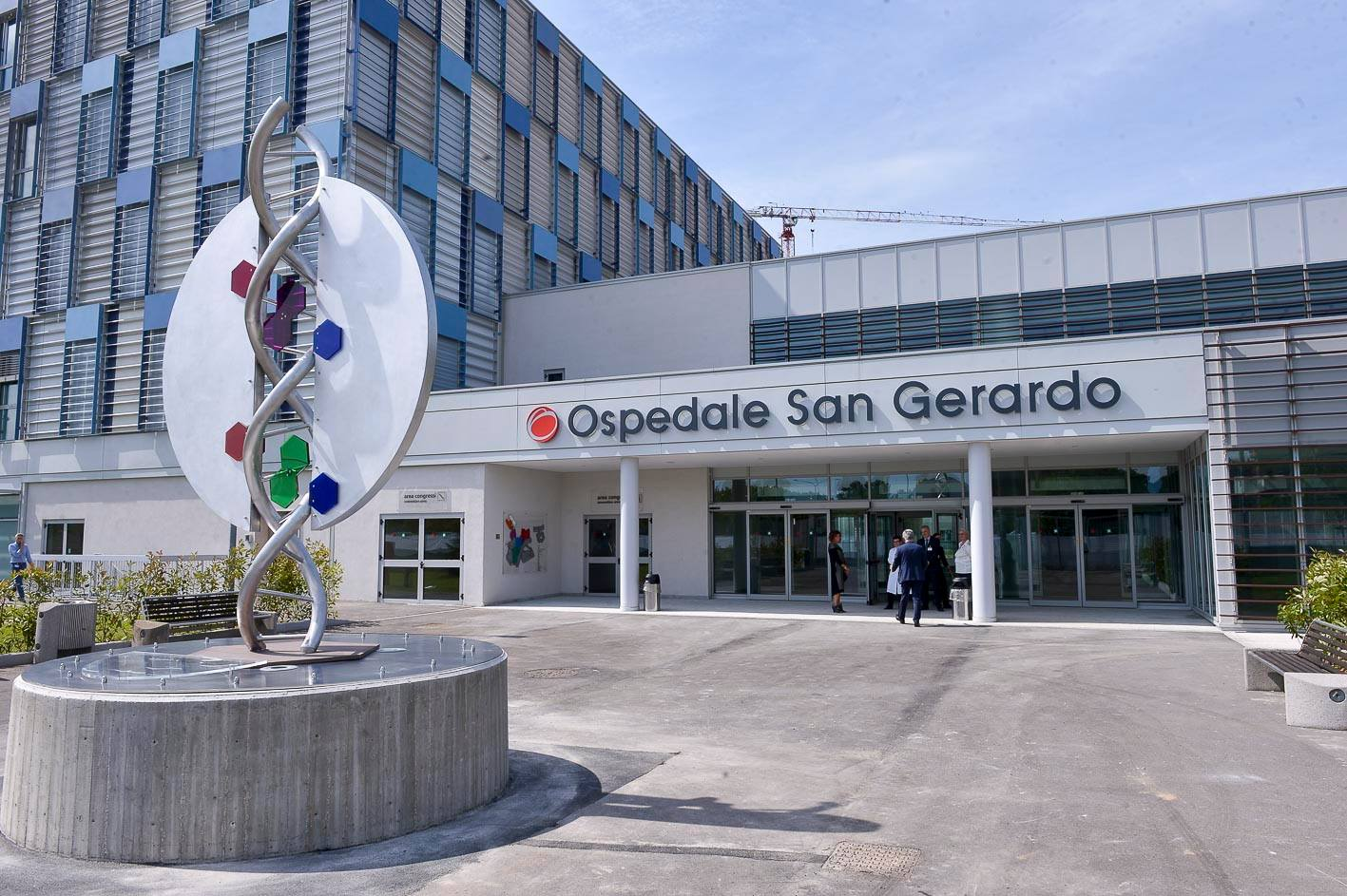
San Gerardo Hospital

Healthcare services in Monza are centred on the San Gerardo Hospital (Ospedale San Gerardo), one of the principal public hospitals in Lombardy. Founded in the 12th century and developed into a modern healthcare complex, it currently serves as a major regional referral centre and a teaching hospital affiliated with the University of Milano-Bicocca.

The hospital provides specialised medical services in areas including cardiology, oncology, surgery and emergency medicine, and plays a central role in healthcare provision for the Brianza area.

Additional healthcare facilities include:

- Policlinico di Monza, a private hospital offering specialised clinical services.
- Istituti Clinici Zucchi, part of the San Donato Group, providing private healthcare services.

The healthcare system in Monza reflects the broader Lombardy model, combining public services with a network of accredited private providers.

== Transport ==
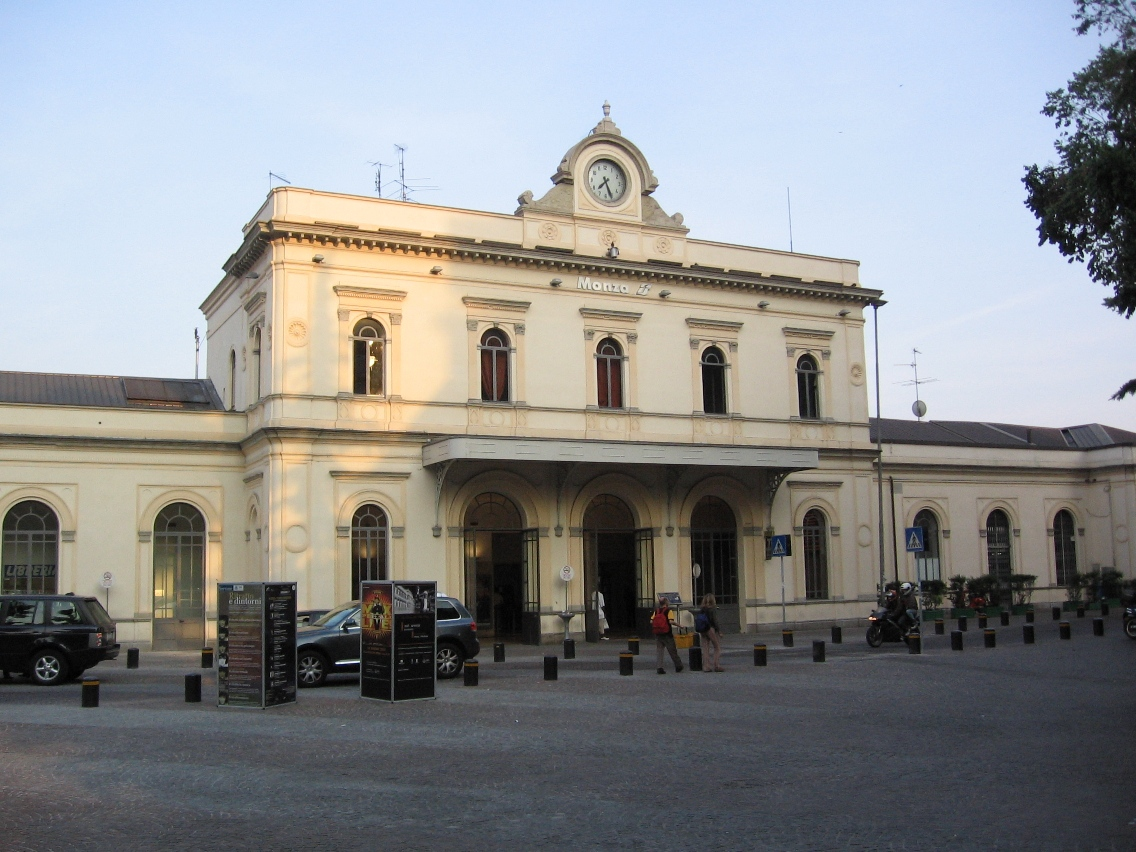
Monza railway station

Monza is a major transport node within the Brianza area and is closely integrated with the Milan metropolitan transport system.

=== Rail ===
Monza railway station is one of the principal railway junctions in northern Lombardy. It lies on the Milan–Chiasso and Milan–Lecco lines and is served by regional, suburban and international services.

The station is connected to the Milan suburban railway network (Servizio ferroviario suburbano di Milano), including lines S7, S8, S9 and S11, providing frequent services to Milan and surrounding areas.

The Milan–Monza railway, inaugurated in 1840, was one of the earliest railway lines in Italy and contributed significantly to the development of the city.

=== Roads ===
Monza is connected to the national motorway network via:

- A4 motorway (Turin–Milan–Venice)
- A51 (East Milan ring road)
- A52 (North Milan ring road)

The SS36 (Strada Statale del Lago di Como e dello Spluga) provides a major connection to Lecco and the Alpine region.

The construction of the Viale Lombardia tunnel (completed in 2013) was a major infrastructure project aimed at reducing traffic congestion and improving urban connectivity.

=== Public transport ===
Public transport in Monza is operated by regional and local companies, including ATM (Milan), NET (Nord Est Trasporti) and Autoguidovie.

The system includes:

- urban bus services
- interurban connections
- integration with the Milan metro network

The planned extension of the Milan Metro Line M5 to Monza represents a major future development in the city's transport infrastructure.

=== Former tramways ===
Monza was historically served by an extensive tram network linking the city to Milan and the Brianza area. Lines included the Milan–Monza tramway and several interurban routes.

These systems were gradually dismantled during the mid-20th century as road transport expanded.

=== Airports ===
Monza is served by several airports in the Lombardy region:

- Milan Linate Airport (nearest, approximately 20 km)
- Milan Malpensa Airport
- Orio al Serio Airport (Bergamo)

These airports provide national and international connections.

== Sport ==
=== Motorsport ===
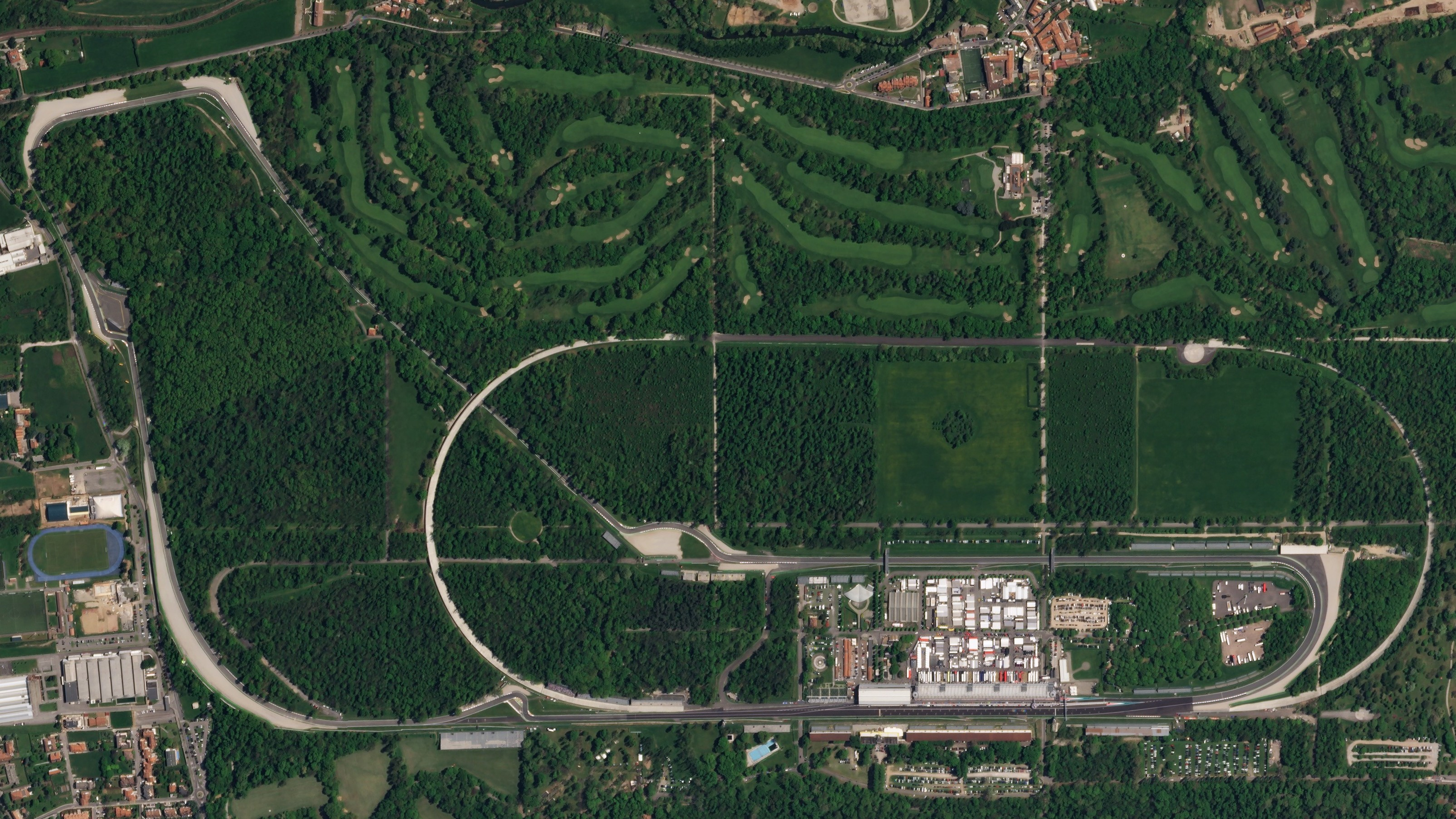
Aerial view of the Autodromo Nazionale di Monza

Monza is internationally known for the Monza Circuit (Italian: Autodromo Nazionale di Monza), located within Monza Park. Opened in 1922, it is one of the world's oldest purpose-built motorsport circuits and has hosted the Italian Grand Prix for most seasons of the Formula One. Nicknamed "the Temple of Speed", the circuit is renowned for its high-speed layout and has become one of the most iconic venues in international motor racing.

In addition to Formula One, the circuit has hosted numerous other competitions, including the World Sportscar Championship, the GT World Challenge Europe, touring car championships, motorcycle racing events, and historic motorsport meetings.

=== Football ===
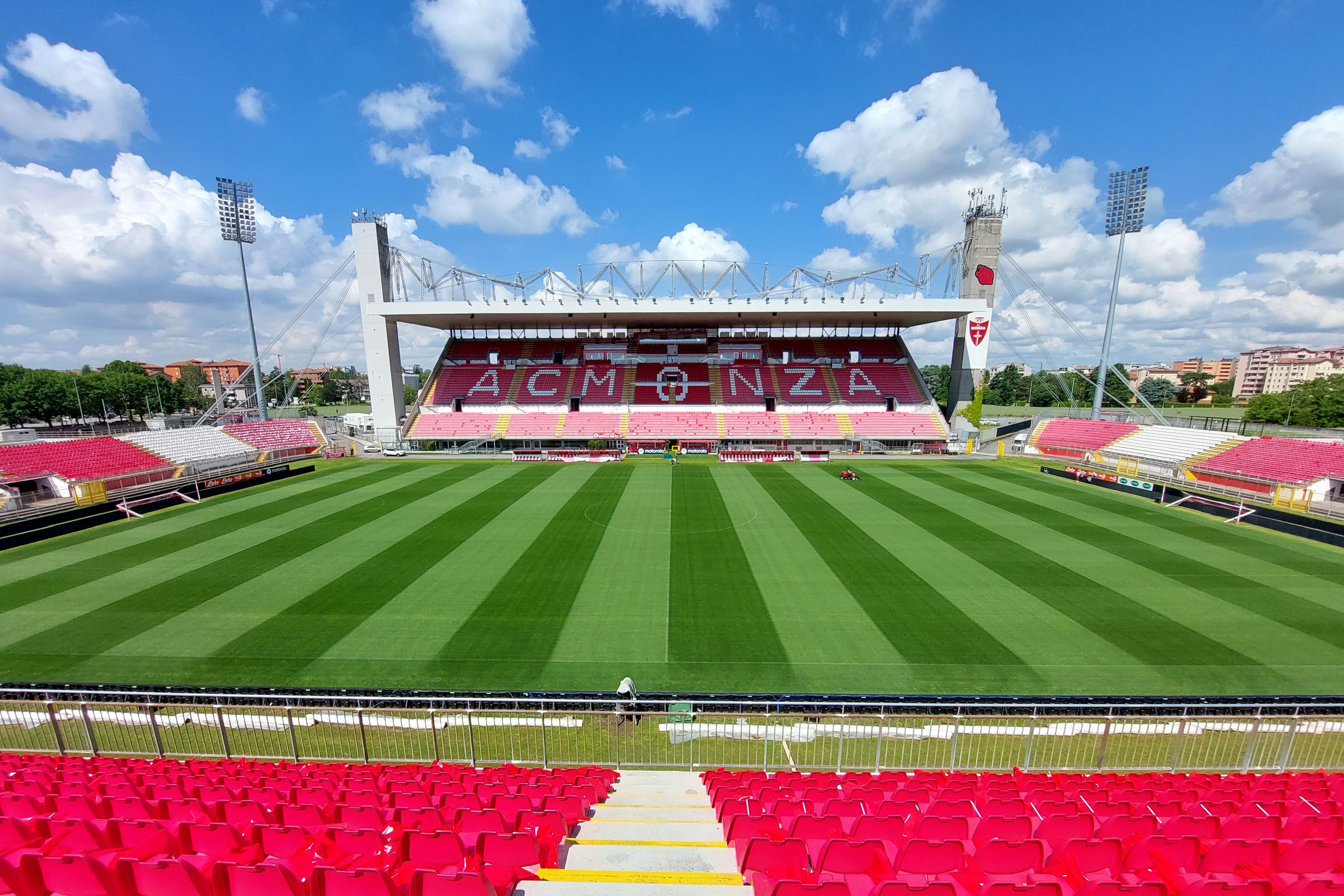
Stadio Brianteo

The city's main football club is AC Monza, founded in 1912 and based at the Stadio Brianteo. For much of its history, the club competed in the lower divisions of Italian football before achieving promotion to Serie A for the first time in 2022.

Several other amateur and youth football clubs are active in the city and the surrounding Brianza area.

=== Volleyball ===
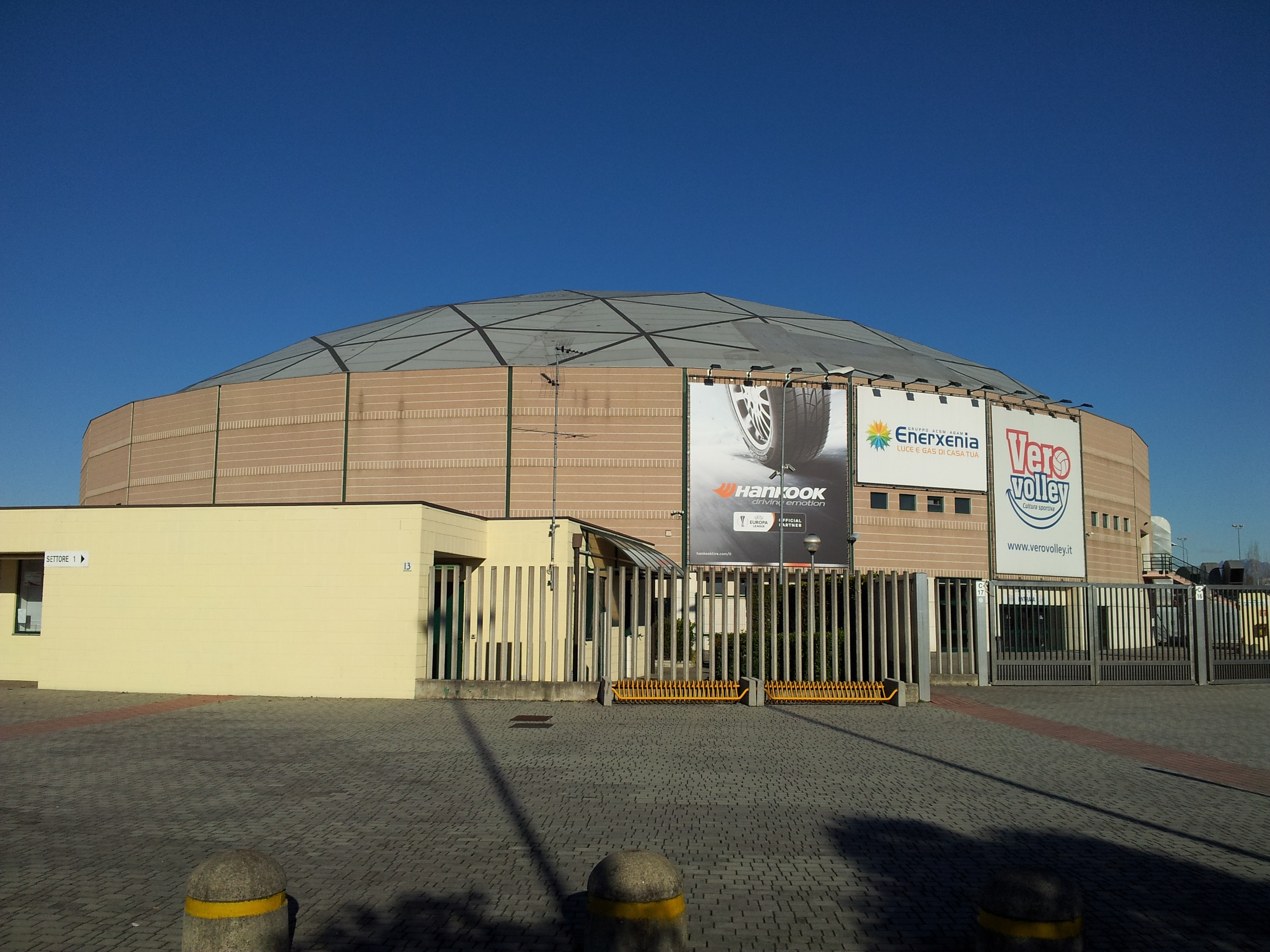
Monza Arena

Monza is represented in professional volleyball by Vero Volley Monza, which competes in the Italian Volleyball League and plays its home matches at the Monza Arena. The Vero Volley organisation also includes a women's team competing in the Italian Women's Volleyball League.

=== Other sports ===
Monza has longstanding links with cycling and has hosted stages of the Giro d'Italia on several occasions. The city's broad avenues and the roads of Monza Park have also been used for national and international cycling competitions. In 1949, the Giro concluded at the Autodromo Nazionale Monza, where the final stage finished.

The Società Ginnastica Monzese Forti e Liberi, founded in 1878, is among the oldest sporting associations in the city and is active in several disciplines. Other sports practised in Monza include rugby, basketball, swimming, and golf, the latter represented by the Golf Club Milano, located within Monza Park.

== Notable people ==
- Theodoric the Great (454–526), King of Ostrogoths
- Agilulf (c. 550–616), King of Lombardy
- Theodelinda (c. 570–628), Queen of Lombardy
- Gundeberga (c. 591–652), Queen of Lombardy and Italy
- Adaloald (602–626), King of Lombardy and Italy
- Rothari (606–652), King of Lombard and Italy
- Berengar I of Italy (c. 845–924), King of Italy
- Saint Gerardo dei Tintori (c. 1134 or 1140–1207), saint
- Bonincontro Morigia (14th century), historical writer
- Giuseppe Arcimboldo (1527–1593), painter
- Giovanni Battista Ala (c. 1598–c.1630), composer and organist
- Carlo Amati (1776–1852), architect
- Paolo Mantegazza (1831–1910), neurologist, physiologist and anthropologist
- Mosè Bianchi (1840–1904), painter
- Luigi Talamoni (1848–1926), priest and blessed
- Emilio Borsa (1857–1931), painter
- Pompeo Mariani (1857–1927), painter
- Ernesto Ambrosini (1894–1951), athlete
- Costantino Nivola (1911–1988), painter and sculptor
- Fiorenzo Magni (1920–2012), cyclist
- Valentino Giambelli (1928–2019), footballer and builder
- Ernesto Brambilla (1934–2020), motorcycle racer
- Vittorio Brambilla (1937–2001), F1 racer
- Gian Paolo Dulbecco (born 1941), painter
- Adriano Galliani (born 1944), football executive
- Daniele Massaro (born 1961), footballer
- Filippo Galli (born 1963), footballer
- Arianna Errigo (born 1988), olympian fencer
- Fabrizio Barbazza (born 1963), F1 racer
- Gianni Bugno (born 1964), cyclist
- Marco Monti (born 1964), footballer and youth coach
- Francesco Antonioli (born 1969), footballer
- Pierluigi Casiraghi (born 1969), footballer
- Marco Castoldi (born 1972), singer
- Massimo Brambilla (born 1973), footballer
- Ewn Garabandal (born 1978), novelist
- Stefano Mauri (born 1980), footballer
- Matteo Pessina (born 1997), footballer
- Celeste Dalla Porta (born 1997), actress
- Cmqmartina (born 1999), singer-songwriter
- Federico Malvestiti (born 2000), racing driver
- Nikolaj Memola (born 2003), figure skater
- Mattia Colnaghi (born 2008), racing driver

== International relations ==
=== Twin towns – sister cities ===
Monza is twinned with:

- (United States) Indianapolis, Indiana, U.S.
- Prague, Czech Republic

== See also ==
- Gothic art and architecture in Monza
- Milan–Monza tramway
- Monza–Trezzo–Bergamo Tramway

== Sources ==
- AA.VV. Biographic Dictionary of Italians. Rome, 1960 (Aliprandi Pinalla).
- AA.VV. Church of St. Mark in Milan. Milan, 1998. Pag. 56–57 (Aliprandi Martino).
- Il Duomo di Monza, 1300–2000, VII Centenary of foundation. Silvana Ed., 1999.
