= Italian Gothic architecture =

Architectural style of Medieval Italy

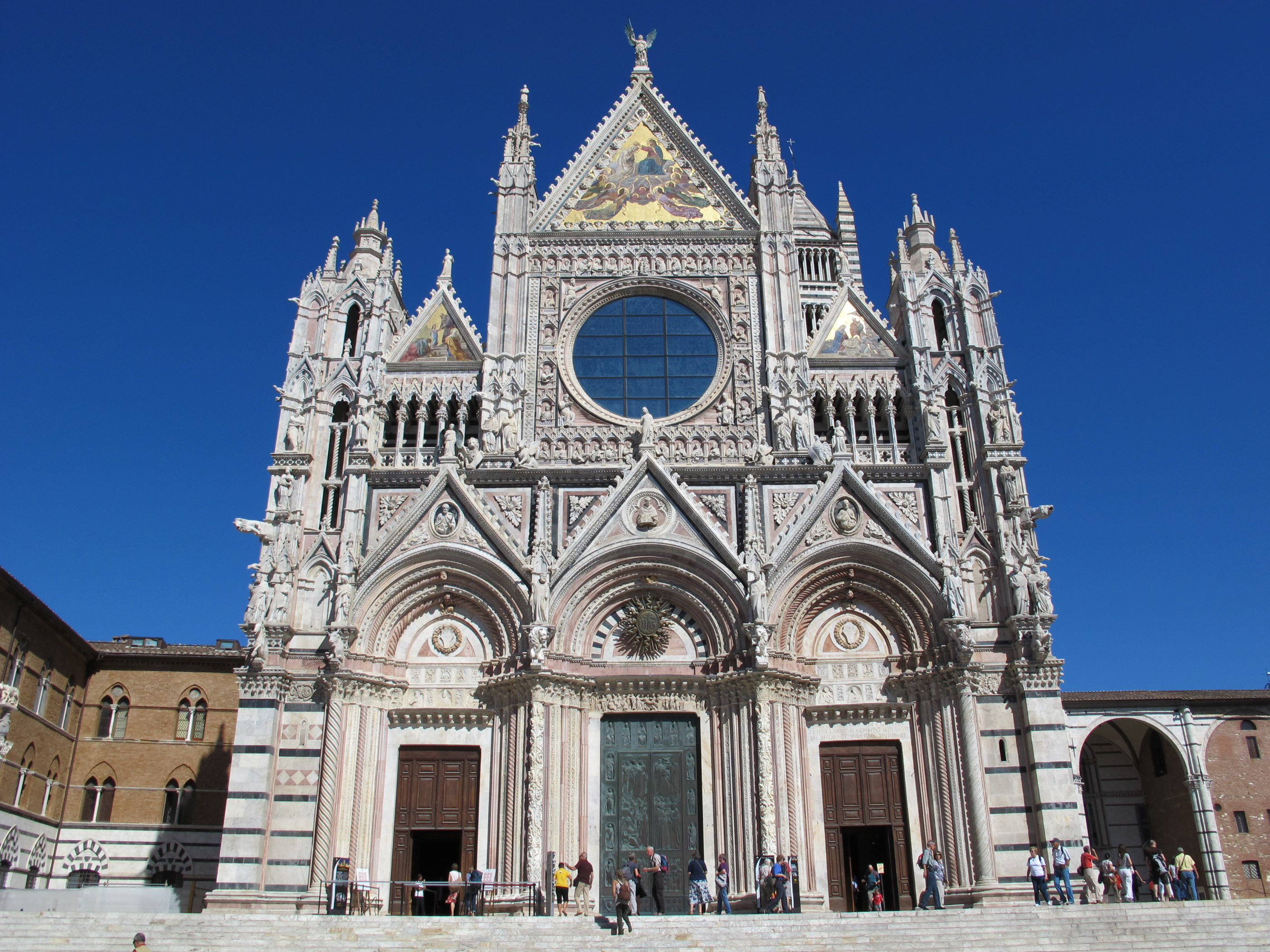
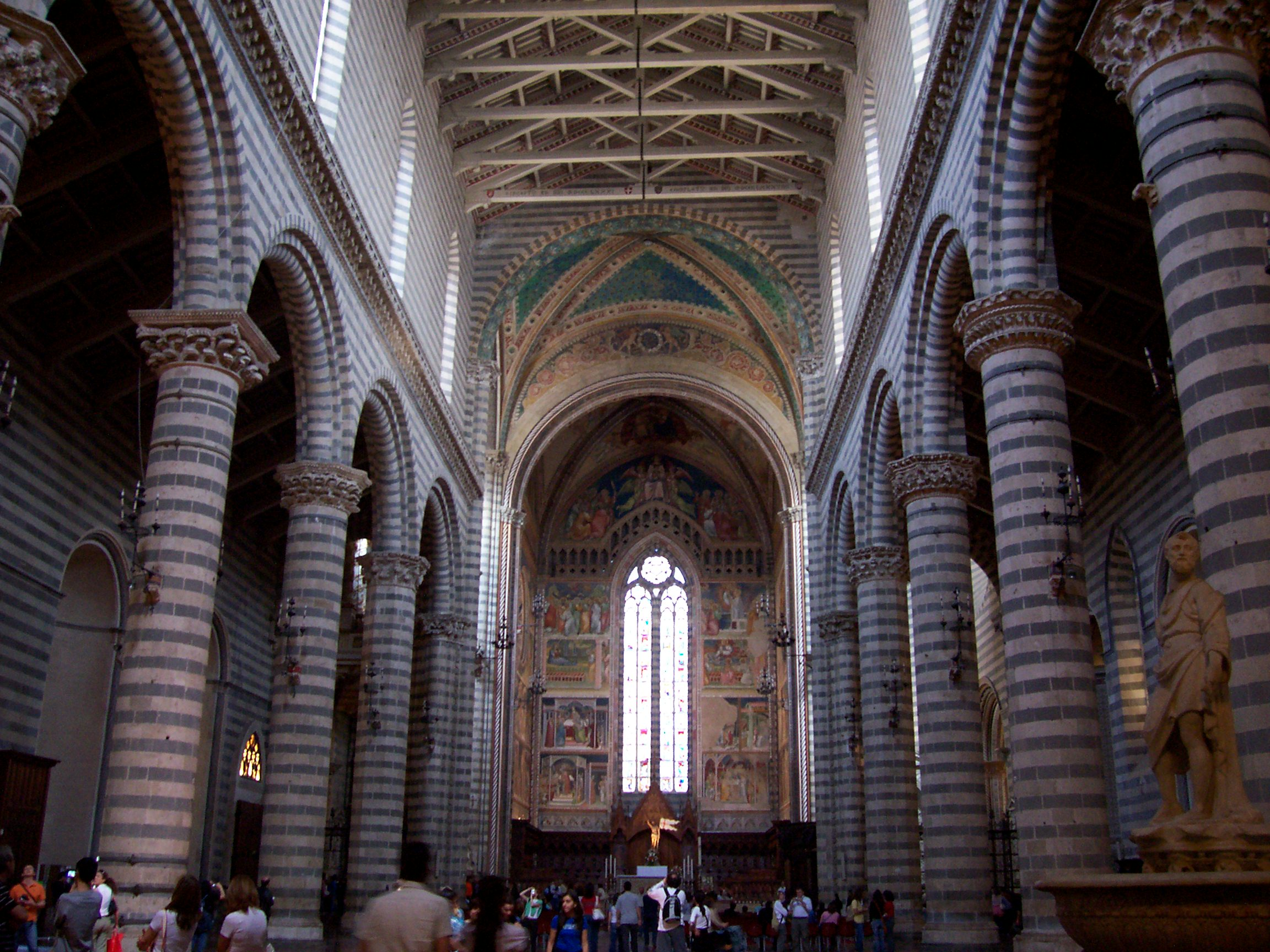
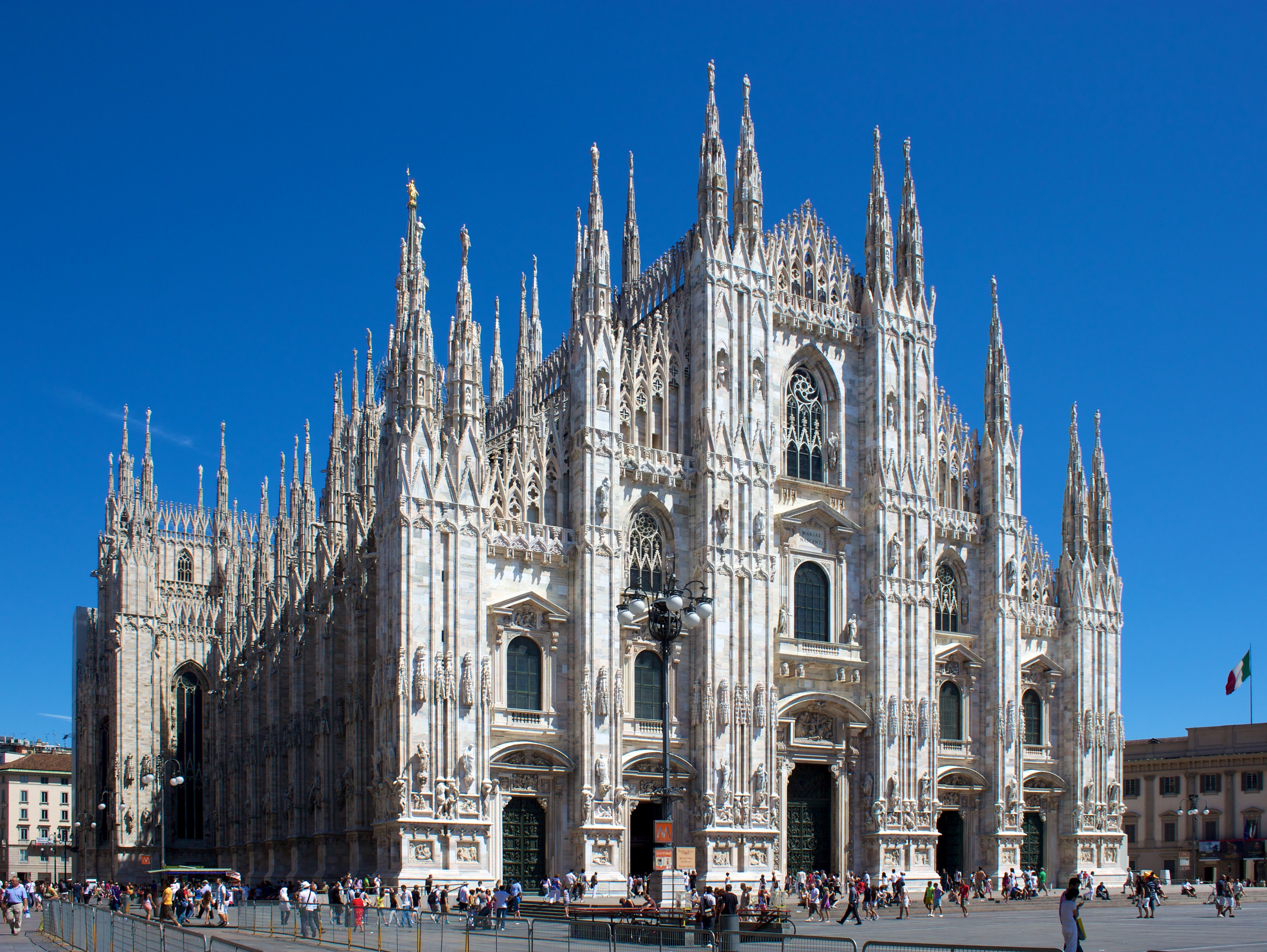
- Top: Siena Cathedral; center: Interior of Orvieto Cathedral; bottom: Milan Cathedral
- Years active: 12th to 15th century
- Location: Italy

Italian Gothic architecture (also called temperate Gothic architecture) has characteristics that distinguish it considerably from those of the place of origin of Gothic architecture, France, and from other European countries in which this language has spread (the United Kingdom, Germany and Spain).

Italian architects preferred to keep the traditional construction methods established in the previous centuries, and architectural solutions and technical innovations of French Gothic architecture were seldom used. A soaring height was less important than in Northern Europe. Brick, rather than stone, was in many areas the most common building material, and marble was widely used for decoration. In the 15th century, when the Gothic style dominated both Northern Europe and the Italian Peninsula, Northern Italy became the birthplace of Renaissance architecture.

== Timeline ==
- Arrival of Cistercian and Franciscan architecture (early 13th century)
- Early Gothic architecture (c. 1228–1290)
- Mature Gothic architecture (1290–1385)
- Late Gothic (from 1385 to the 16th century)

== Early Italian Gothic (13th century) ==
The Gothic style was first introduced into Italy in the 12th century by monks of the Cistercian and Franciscan Orders. The Cistercian Order was founded in France in 1098 as a breakaway from the Benedictine Order, which the Cistercians considered too lax. The Cistercians were determined on a stricter following of the Rule of Saint Benedict. They built austere churches, first in the Romanesque style and then with Gothic features but with a complete absence of decoration. The Cistercians banned any form of art, sculpture, or stained glass. Bell towers were absent or very simple. Nothing was permitted unless it had an essential practical purpose. Churches were usually far from the centre of cities.

The first Gothic structures in Italy were the Cistercian churches of Fossanova Abbey and Casamari Abbey, which were built on the model of the Cistercian churches in the Duchy of Burgundy, particularly the original Cistercian church, Citeaux Abbey. Casamari was originally built as a Benedictine church but was rebuilt entirely to meet the standards of simplicity and austerity of the Cistercians. The Cistercians built several churches throughout the Italian Peninsula, mostly in the countryside. They went as far as Sicily, where they constructed the unfinished basilica of Murgo near Lentini in the Province of Syracuse, begun in 1225.

The spread of the French style of Gothic introduced by the Cistercians was resisted by the hierarchy of the Catholic Church in Rome, which preferred a return to the earlier style of architecture under Constantine the Great and of the Byzantine Empire. The first Gothic church in Rome, Santa Maria sopra Minerva, a Dominican church, was a copy of Santa Maria Novella in Florence, and was not begun until 1280.

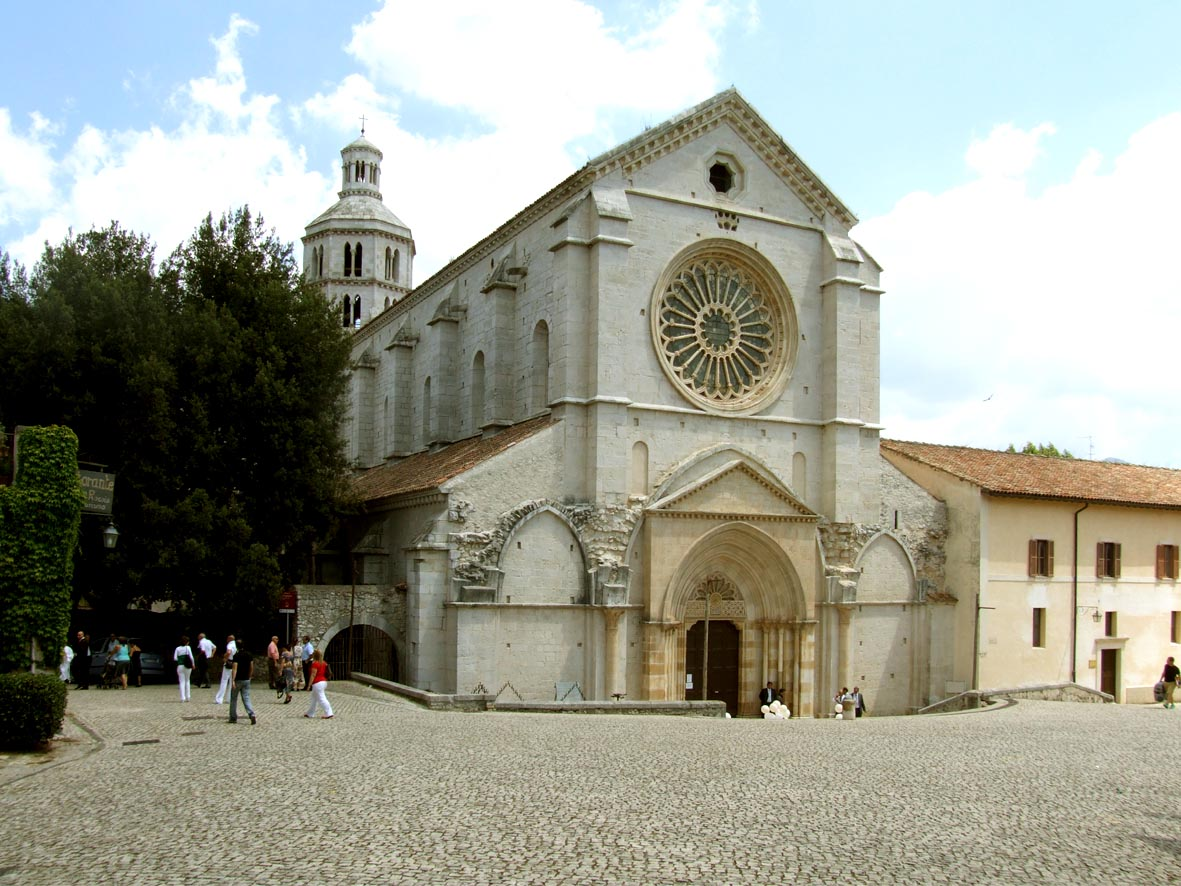
The Cistercian Fossanova Abbey (founded 1208)

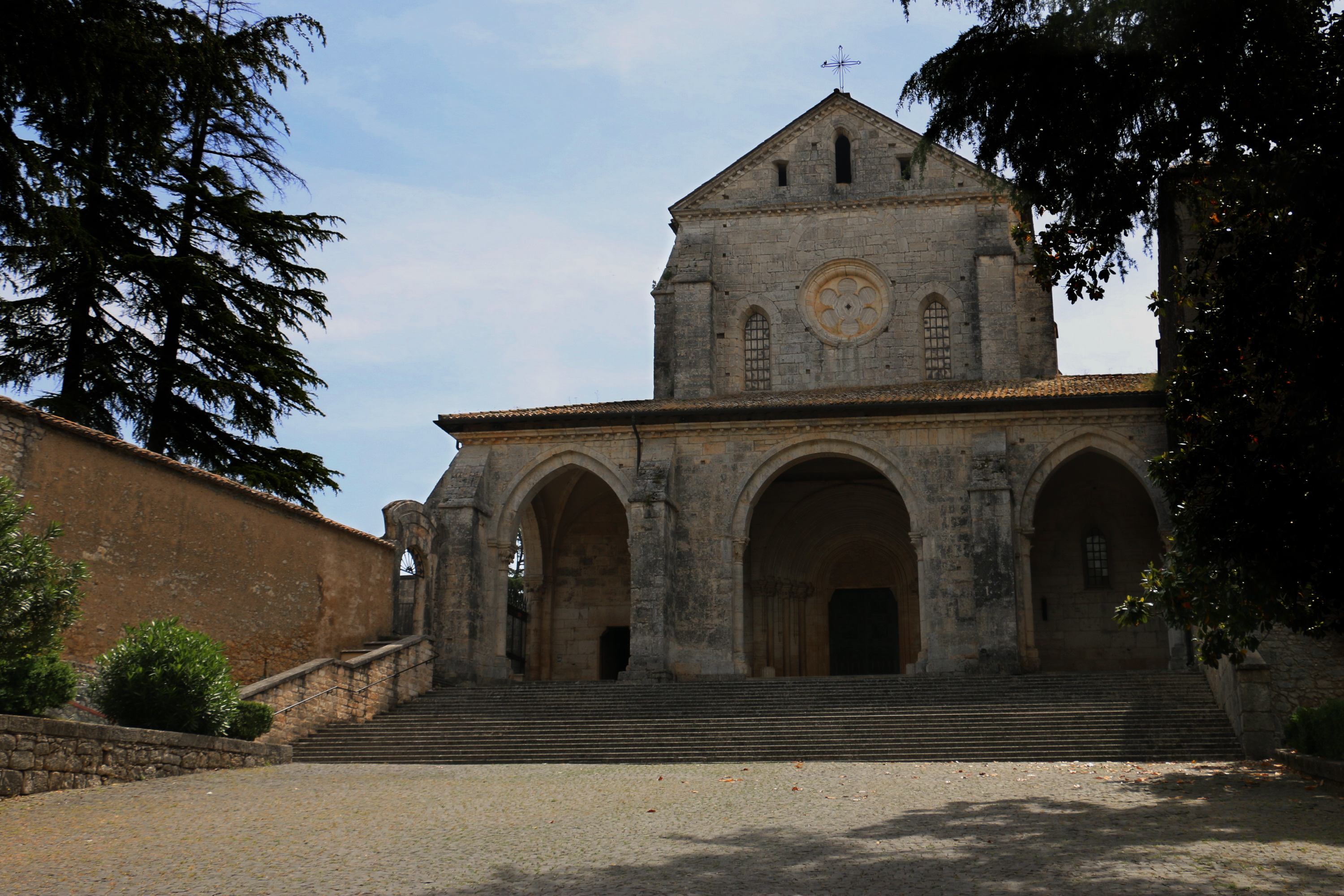
Casamari Abbey (rebuilt 1207–1213)

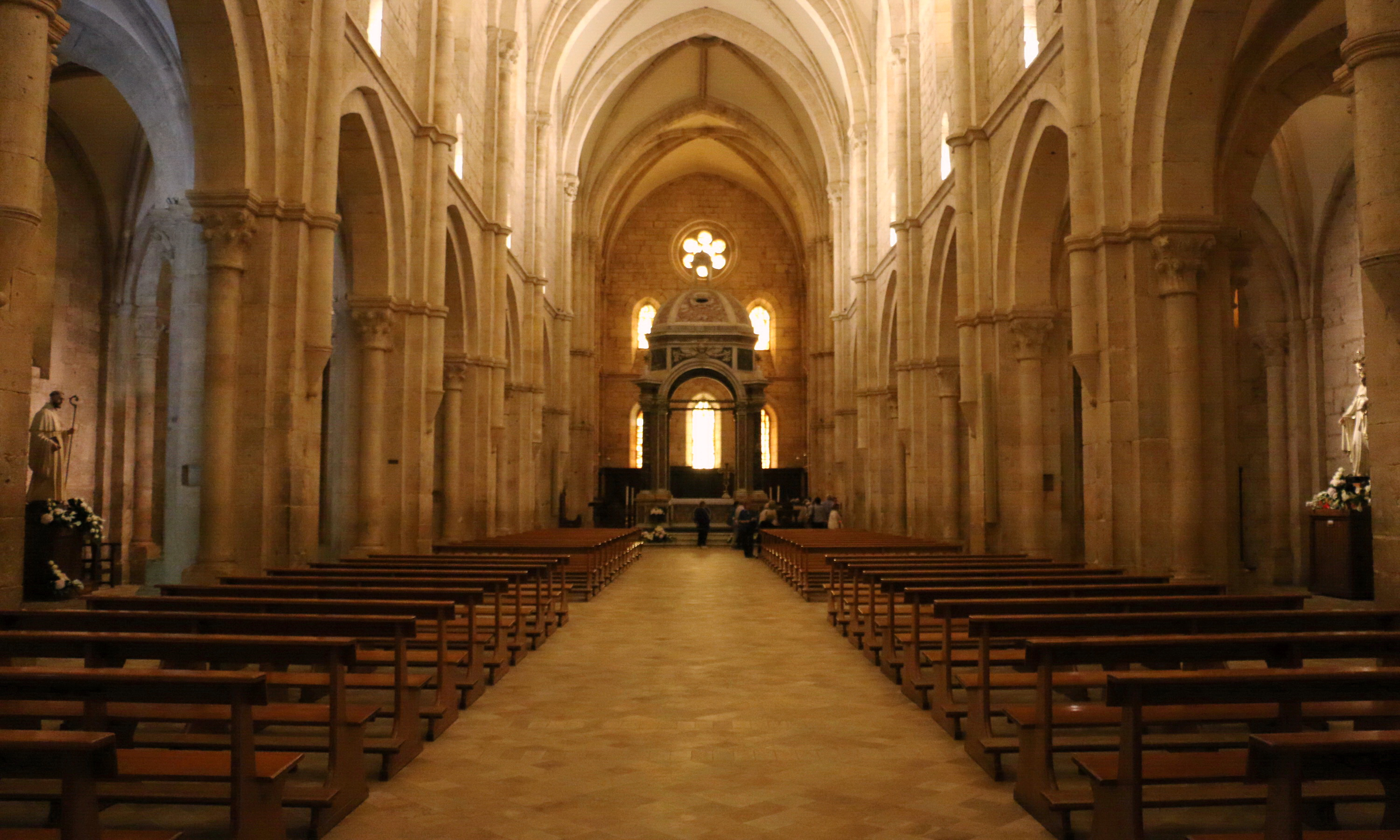
Interior of Casamari Abbey

The Franciscans were founded by Saint Francis of Assisi in 1208. Their doctrine called for reaching out to the general population with their message, which meant constructing churches with large naves without any visual obstacles for preaching sermons to large congregations. Unlike Cistercian churches, they welcomed art in their architecture. The upper parts of their first major church, the Basilica of San Francesco of Assisi (1228–1253) were decorated with colourful murals by Cimabue depicting the lives of the Saints. The Basilica was in the form of a simple Latin cross, and had none of the aspirations to great height of the French Gothic style. It was built of brick, covered with plaster on the inside. The stained glass windows were reduced in size, simple and colourless.

The Franciscans constructed another important church, San Francesco, Bologna, in 1236 to 1230 that was closer to the French Gothic model. It was built of red brick, beginning a tradition in Bologna architecture that lasted for two centuries. The facade was similar to those of Romanesque churches, but inside it had a more Gothic form, with aisles, an ambulatory with radiating chapels, and flying buttresses. Other important early buildings included the Parma Baptistery by Benedetto Antelami and the Basilica di Sant'Andrea in Vercelli, which showed Antelami's influence.

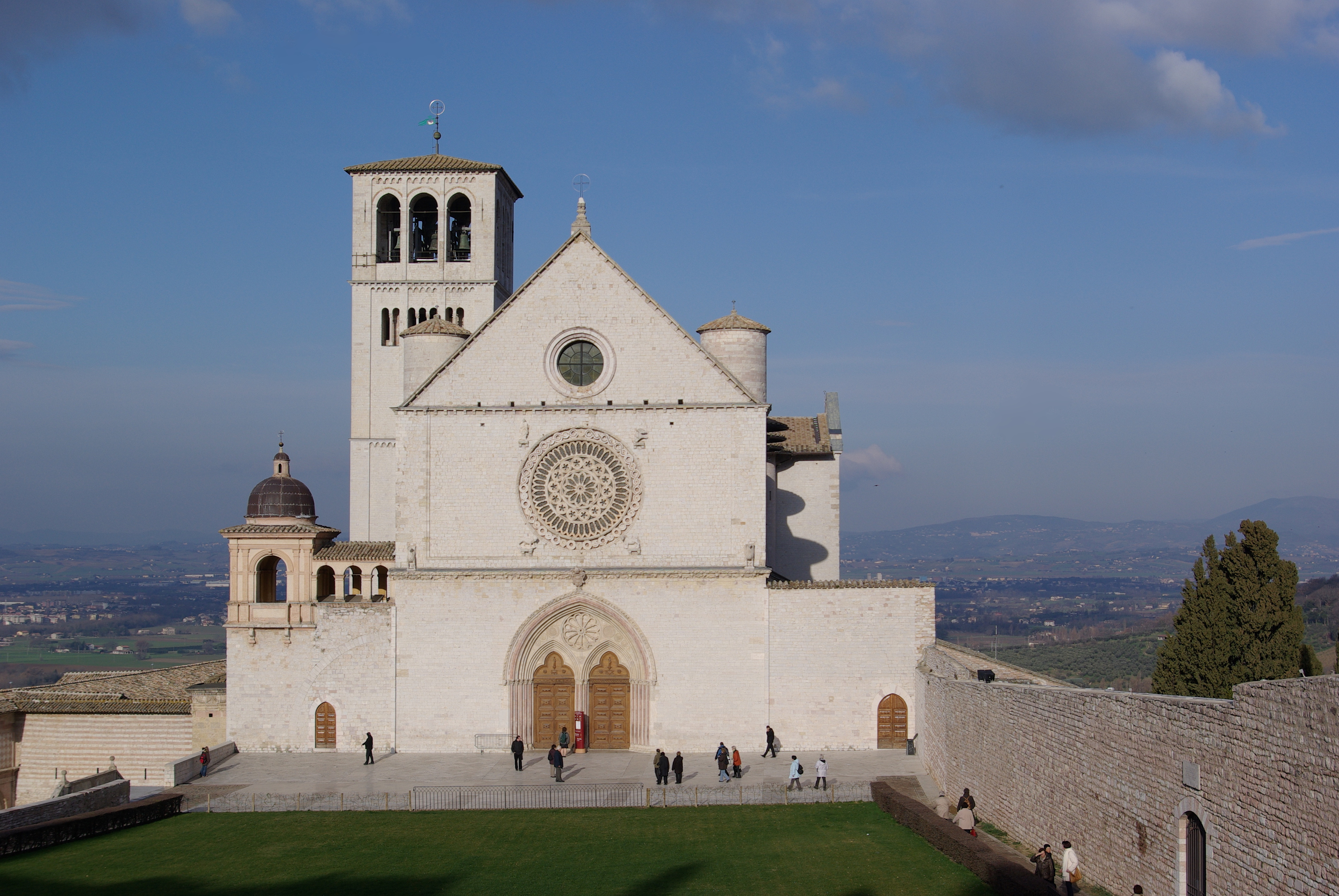
Basilica of San Francesco of Assisi (completed 1263)

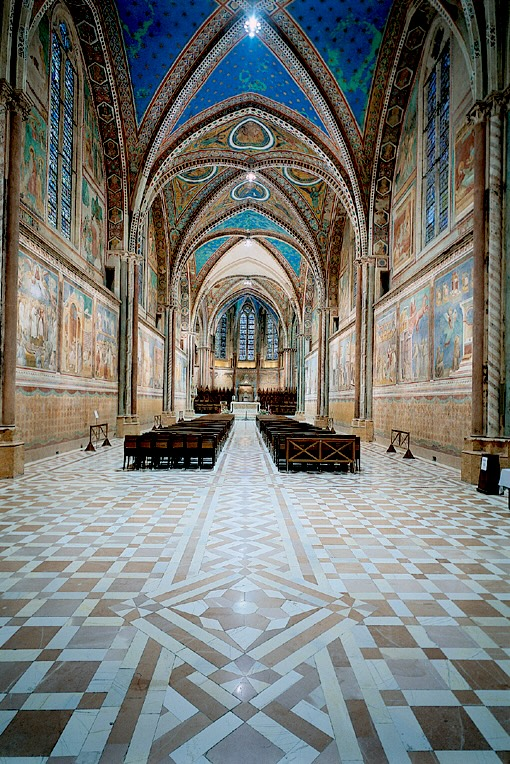
Nave of the upper Basilica of San Francesco of Assisi, with murals by Cimabue

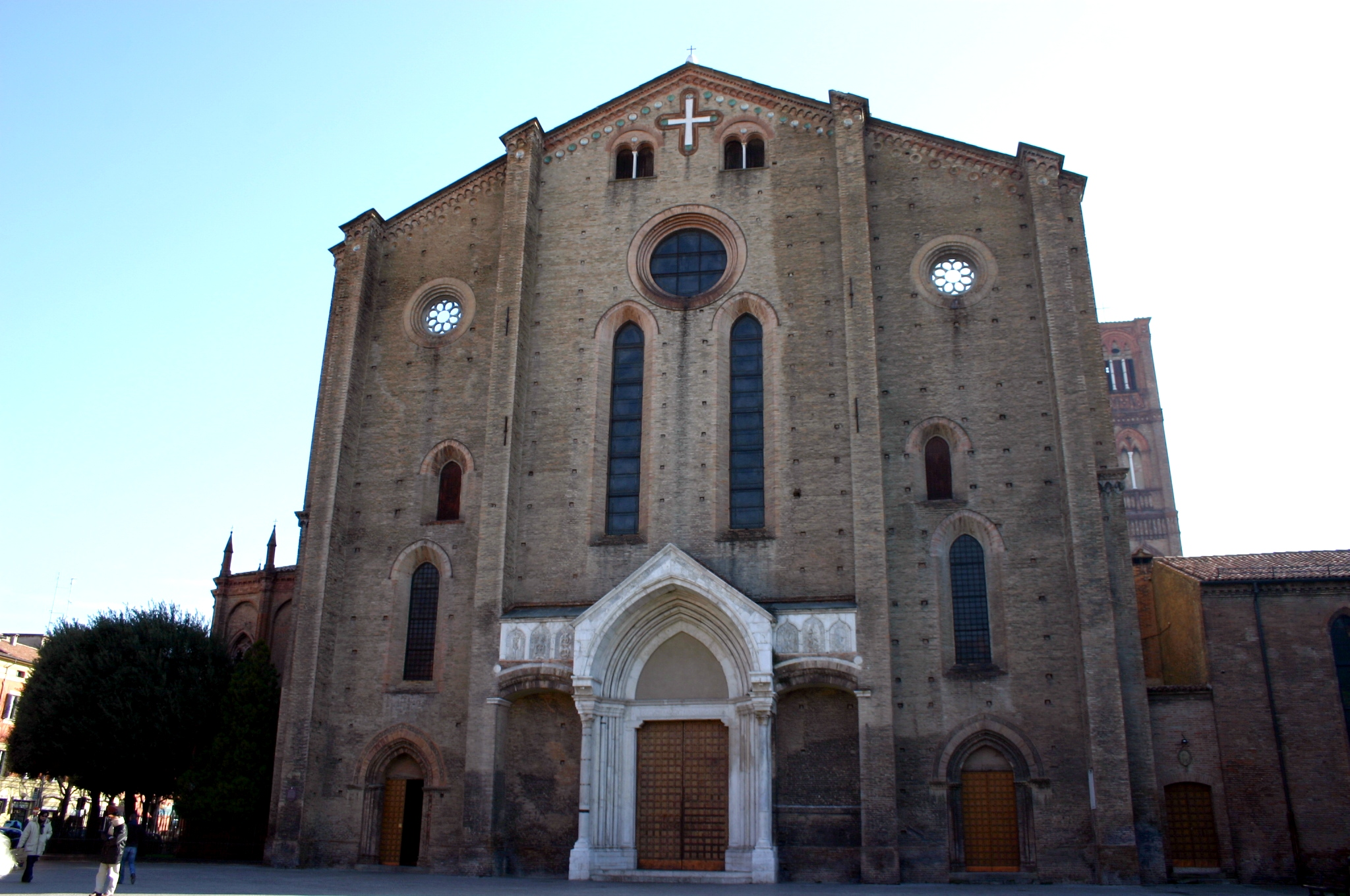
San Francesco, Bologna (1236–1263)

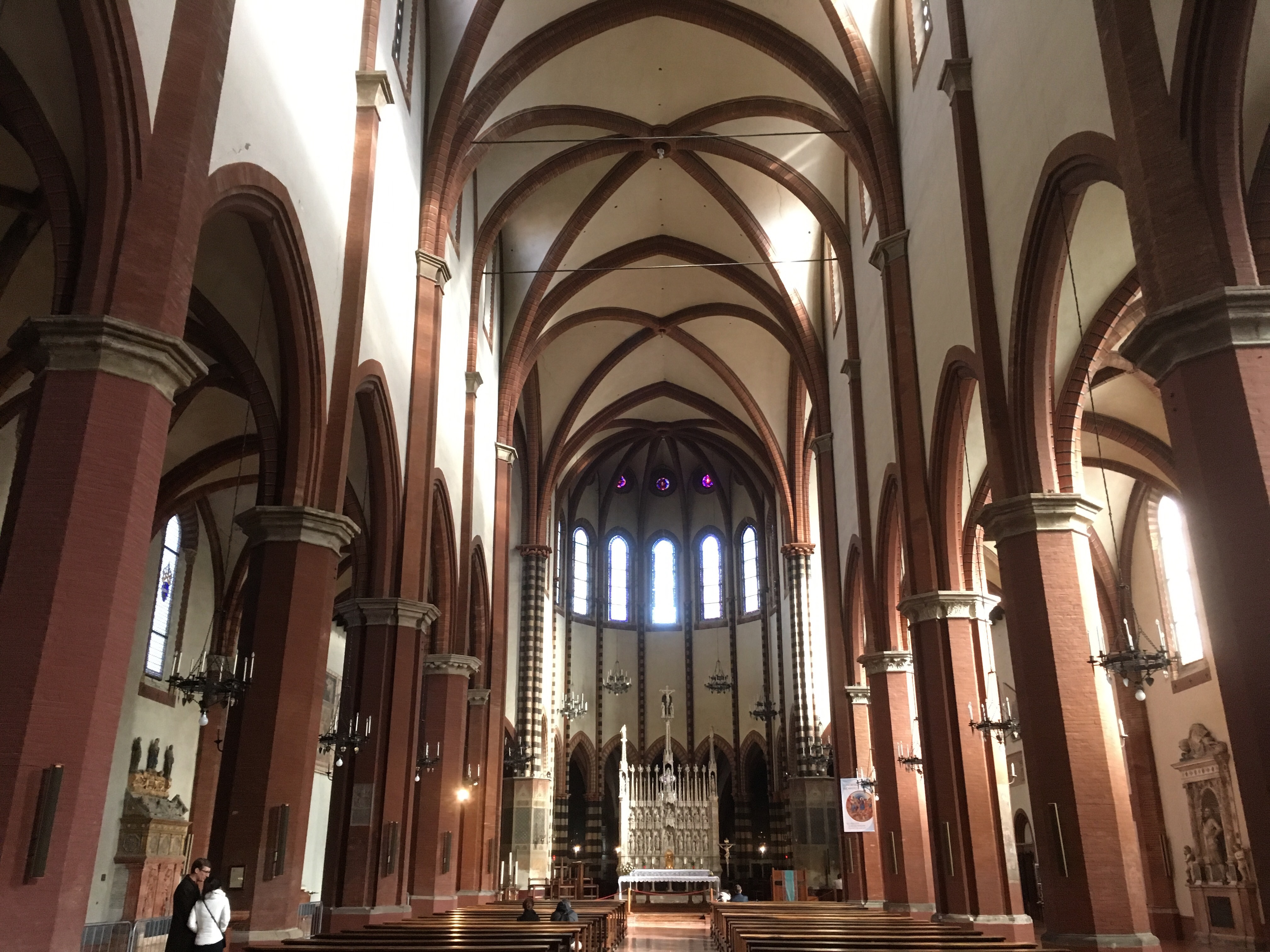
Interior of San Francesco, Bologna

Siena Cathedral (1215–1263), which was begun in the mid-13th century, is another major landmark church of early Italian Gothic. Its interior is a mixture of Gothic and Romanesque elements, such as the domed crossing tower, and horizontal banding of the interior columns with polychrome marble. The most striking and original Gothic feature is the decorated screen facade on the west end, with sculptural decoration designed and partly carved by Giovanni Pisano in 1284–1320.

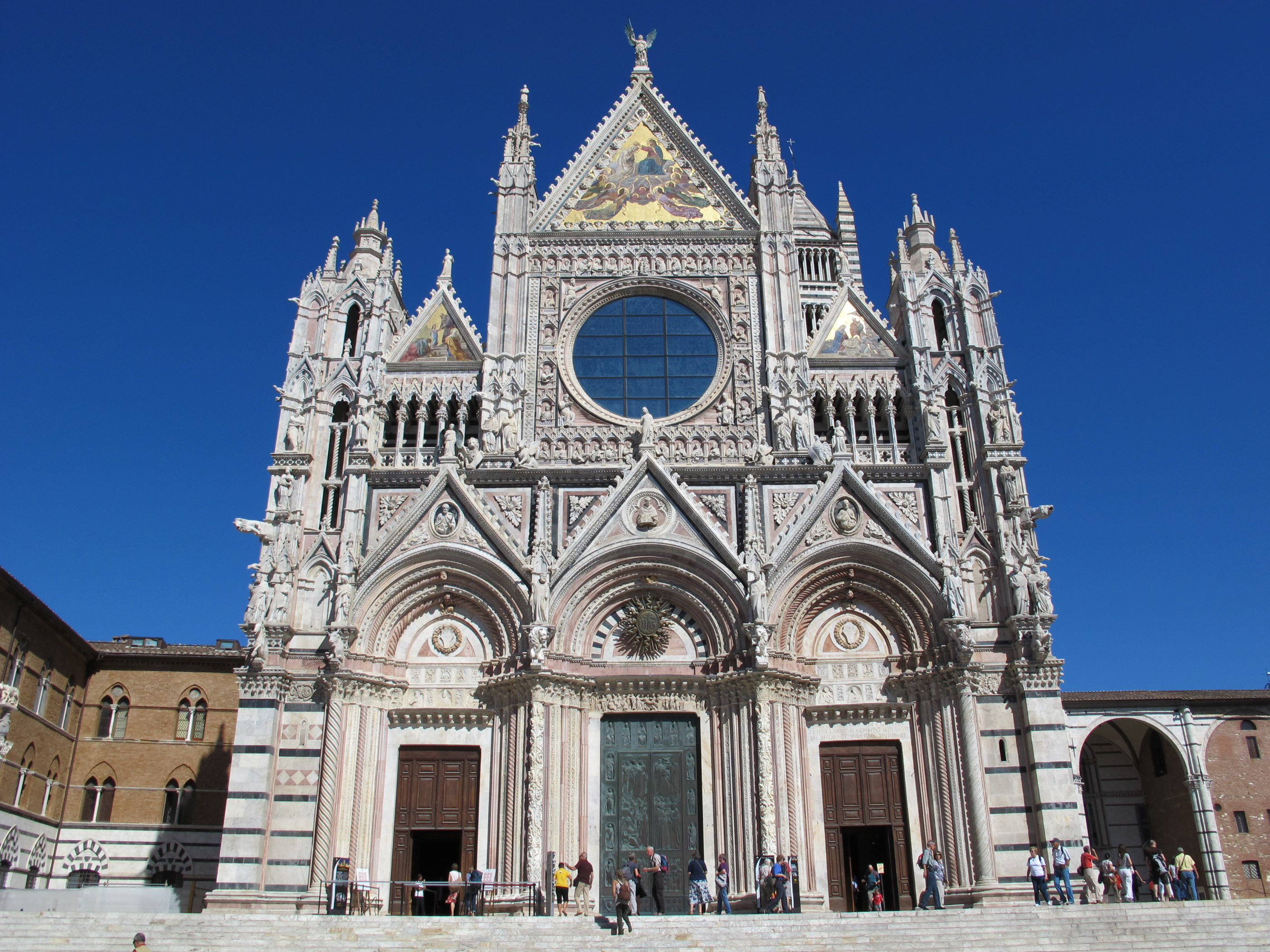
Facade of Siena Cathedral (1215–1263)

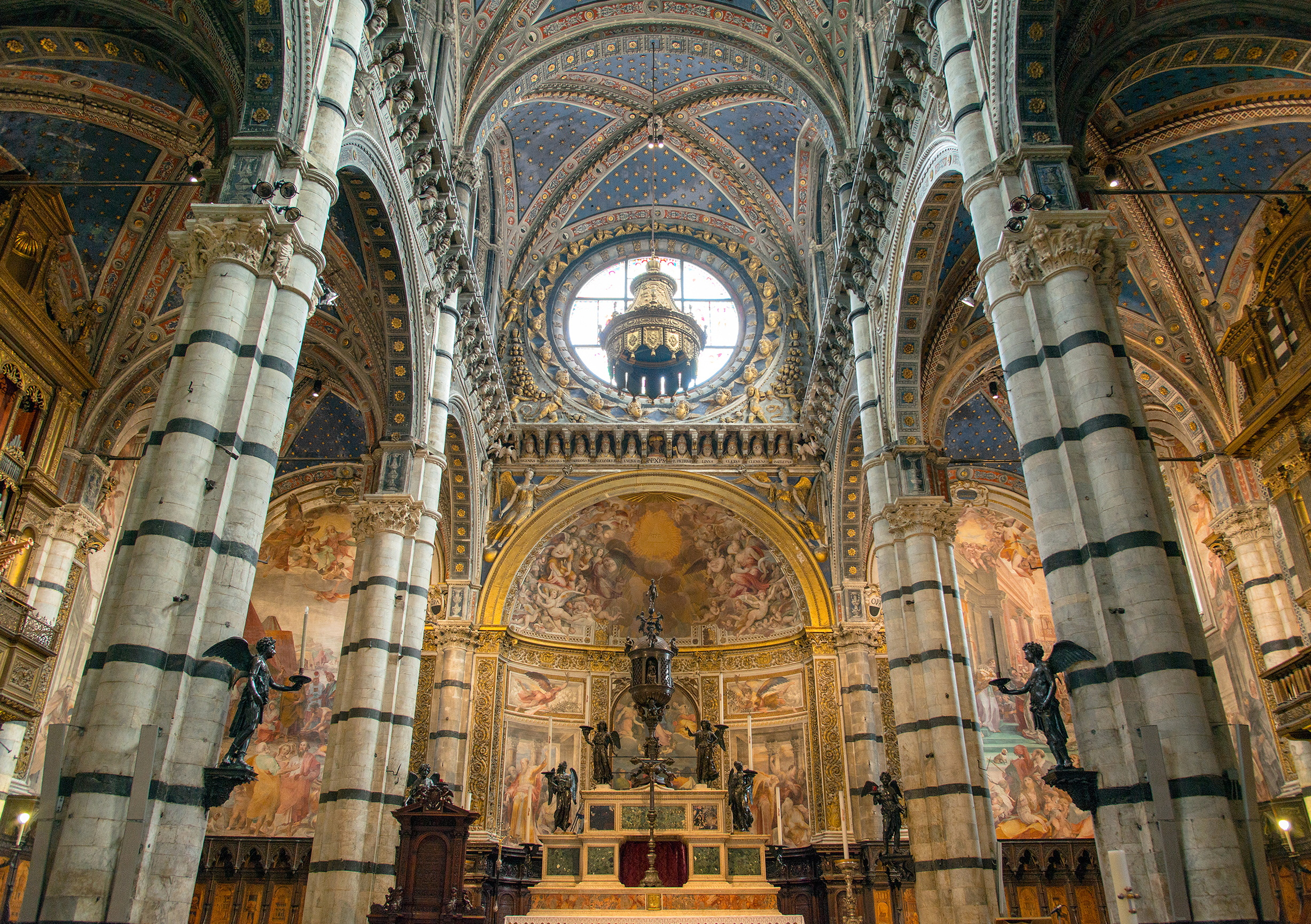
Altar and polychrome marble pillars of Siena Cathedral
- Church of Santa Maria della Spina, Pisa (1230)
- Basilica of Sant'Antonio of Padua
- Church of San Francesco, Bologna (1236–1263)
- Church of Santa Maria Novella, Florence

== Mature or High Italian Gothic (14th century) ==
=== Florence Cathedral ===
A number of major Italian Gothic buildings were begun in the late 13th century and completed in the 14th. Florence Cathedral, designed by Arnolfo di Cambio, was begun in 1296. It is not exceptionally high, but the interior has a sense of spaciousness created by the merger of the nave and the aisles. The work proceeded very slowly. The campanile, designed by Giotto, was begun in 1334. Work continued after Giotto's death in 1337, first under Andrea Pisani and then, in the 1350s, by Francesco Talenti. The campanile is square and decorated in marble with rectilinear panelling, and follows the Italian Romanesque tradition. It was largely modelled after the older baptistery (1060–1150).

The Cathedral plans were modified between 1357 and 1360 by several committees of painters, sculptors and artists, giving priority to the decoration. The City of Florence took it very seriously as a civic monument, financing it with a tax upon all the male inhabitants of the city, and even lowering the level of the streets around it so it would be more visible. A modified new plan adopted in 1366 called for a massive dome, as wide as the combined nave and aisles, on an octagonal base with three apses. The technical problems of building such a large dome were not solved until the 15th century with a new plan by Brunelleschi. The rather plain original façade was demolished to construct the dome; the present façade was not built until the 19th century. The east end of the cathedral largely retains its original Gothic architecture.

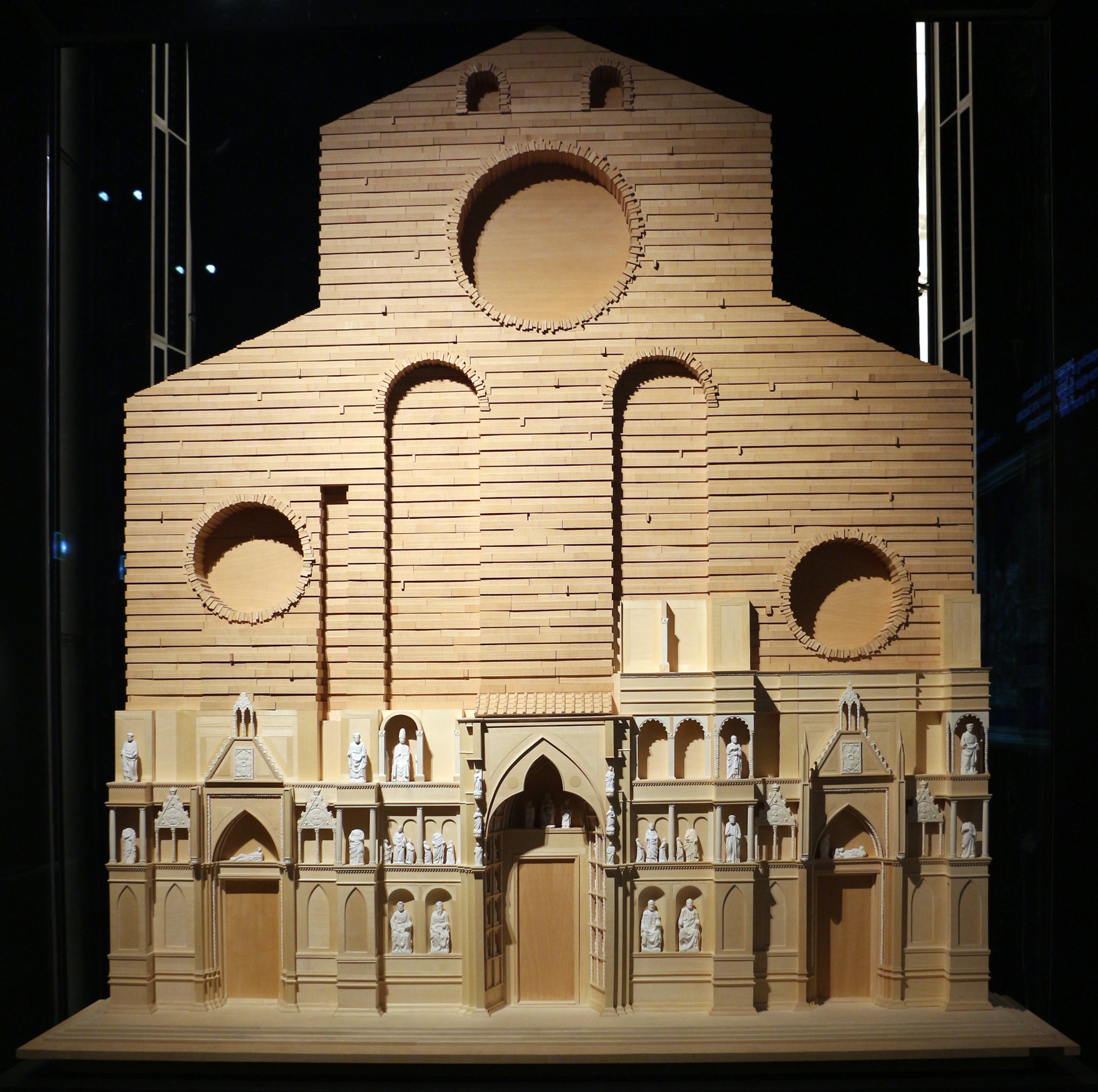
Model of the original facade

The Duomo (15th c.) and Campanile (14th c.) of Florence Cathedral (1296–1366)

The Gothic east end of Florence Cathedral

=== Orvieto Cathedral ===
The Construction of Orvieto Cathedral occupied three centuries, from 1290 to 1591, nearly the entire span of the Gothic period. It was begun by Pope Urban IV as a pilgrimage church to display the relic of a proclaimed miracle, the Corporal of Bolsena. The architecture of the facade is in the basic Romanesque style.

In 1309, Lorenzo Maitani, an architect and sculptor from Siena, became the master-builder. He redesigned the plans to give it greater structural integrity and more unified form. The original plan of the facade was modelled after Siena Cathedral. Under Maitani It gradually became a showcase of Gothic art; the interior and upper portions of the facade were decorated with mosaics, sculpted figures and reliefs in marble and bronze. The upper portions of the mosaics on the facade are gilded. In the interior, the most striking features are the banded polychrome columns, and the walls covered with murals.

A number of churches in this period followed the style of San Francesco in Bologna and were built of red brick, plastered on the inside, instead of stone. The architects of many Italian Gothic churches ignored the French Gothic use of flying buttresses and used wooden tie beams across the nave to support the upper walls.

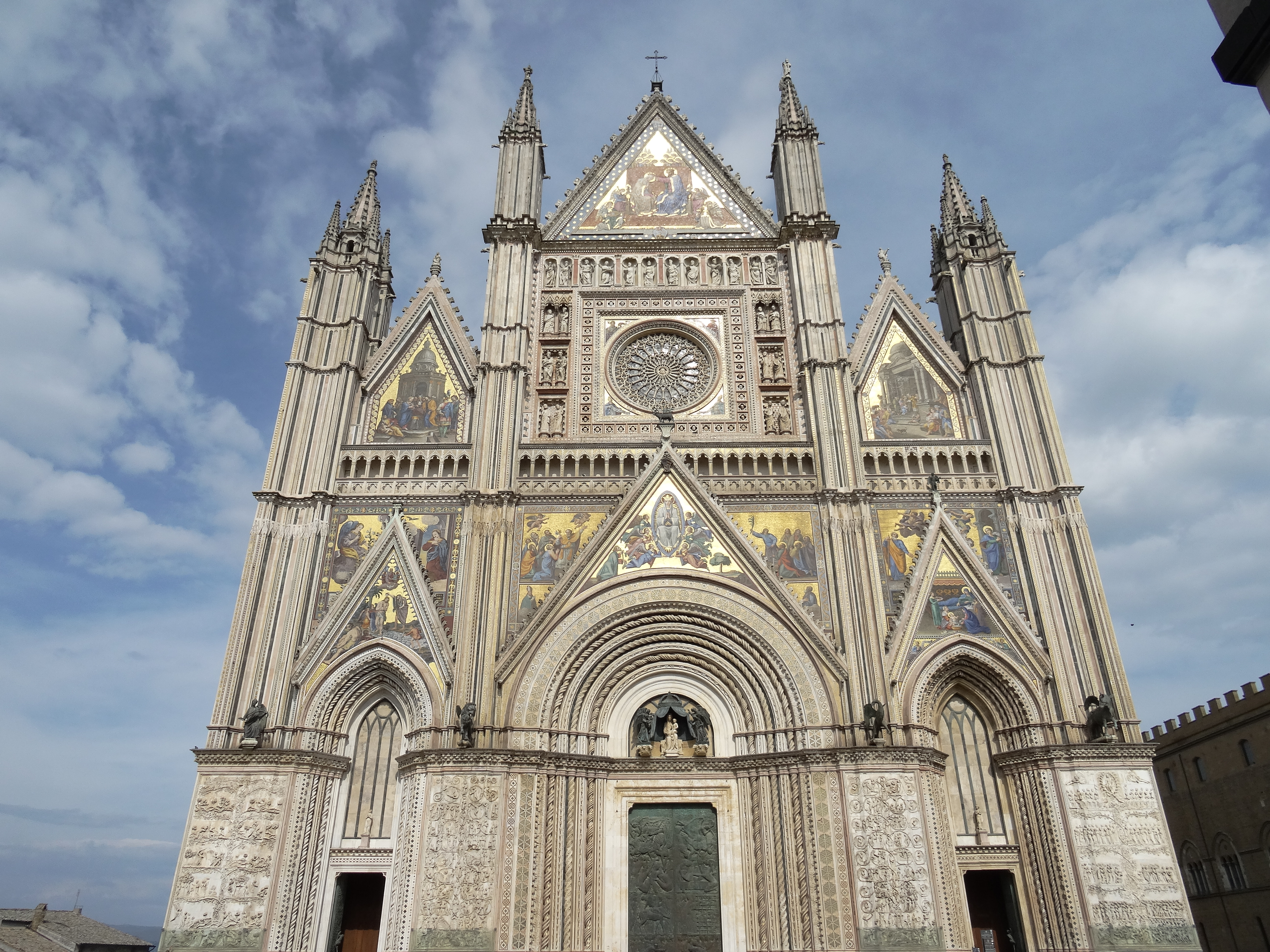
Facade of Orvieto Cathedral

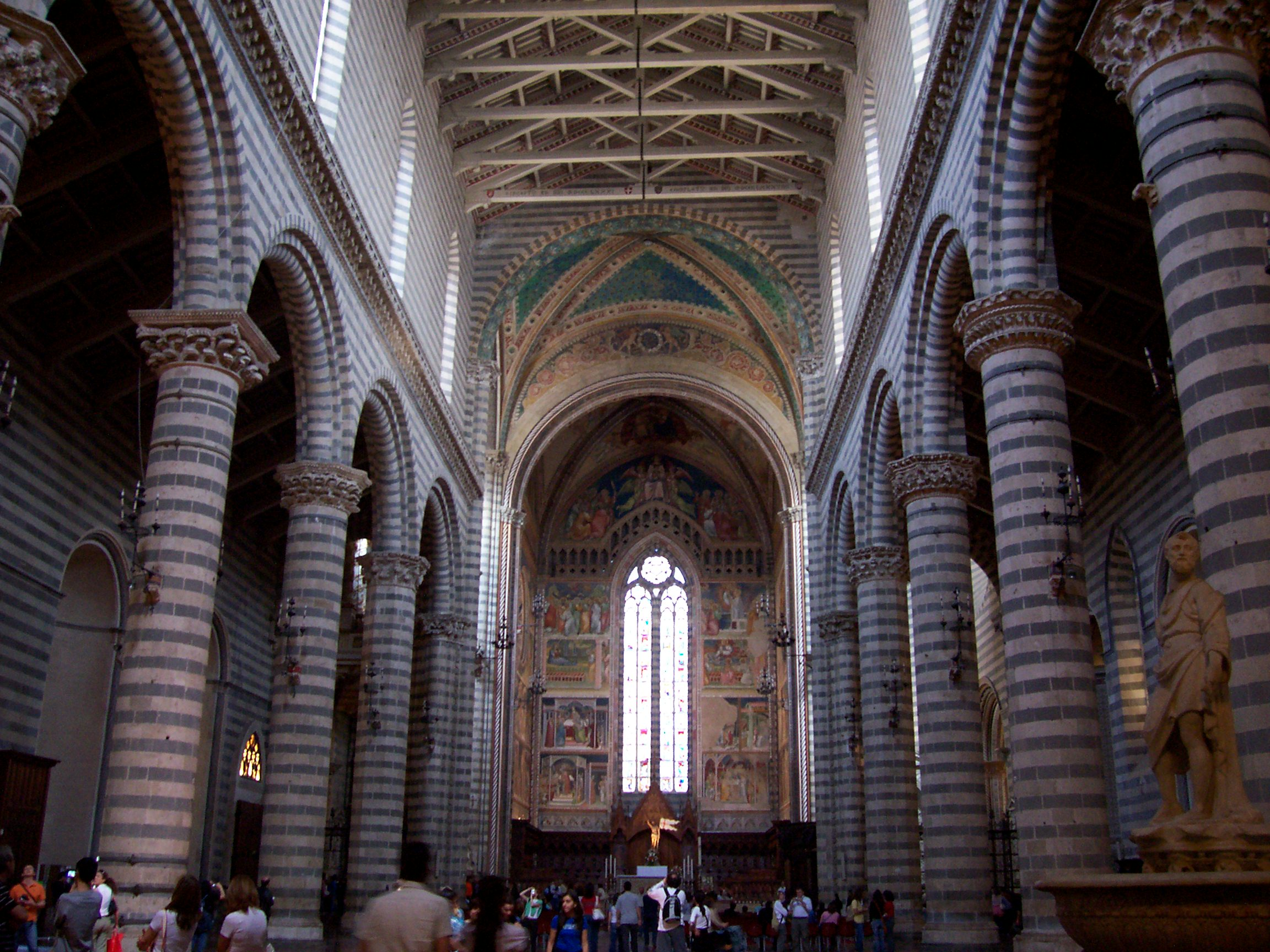
Nave of Orvieto Cathedral

== Late Gothic (Late 14th century) ==
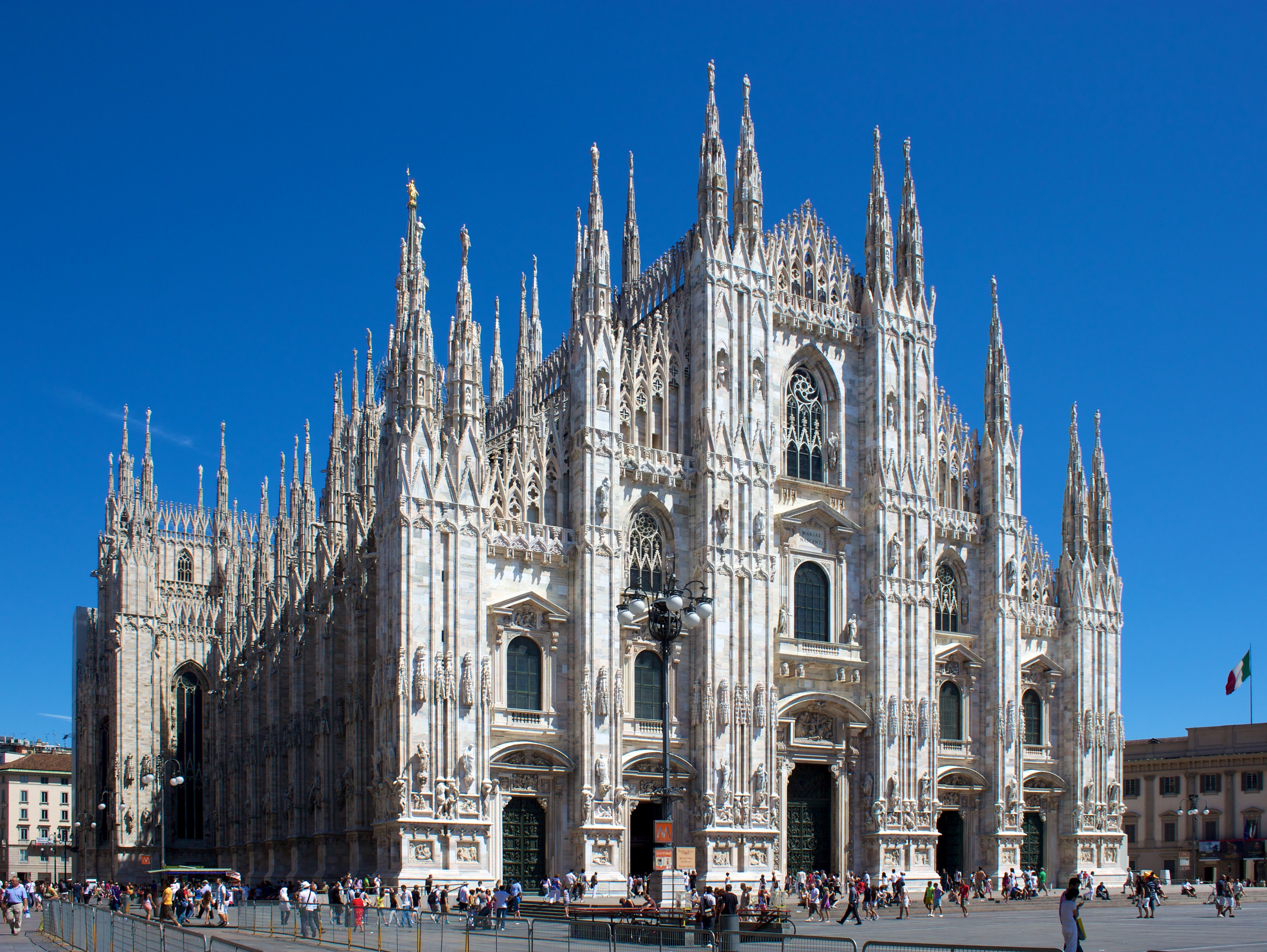
Milan Cathedral facade

=== Milan Cathedral ===
Milan Cathedral, also called the Duomo, was begun in the late fourteenth century. It was one of the most ambitious Italian Gothic cathedrals, and one of the few that adapted many of the structural features of French Gothic, including the flying buttress and the arched rib vault. It also has a highly ornamented exterior, with many pinnacles and crockets, as well as great numbers of statues and reliefs. Work began in 1387, based generally on the plans of two French Cathedrals, Bourges Cathedral and Le Mans Cathedral, with the plan of a high central nave descending in steps downward over the aisles. At the same time, it followed the Italian preference for great interior space. The planning and early work involved an extraordinary number of prominent master masons from across Europe, including Jean Mignot and Nicolas de Bonaventure from Paris, Hans Parler from Germany, and a renowned Italian mathematician, Gabriele Stornaloco.

Construction continued, with many interruptions, over the centuries; it was not finally completed until 1965; the style was kept generally consistent, especially for the exterior, but for example the doors and windows on the front facade have classicizing Renaissance-Baroque door-frames. Its remarkable features include its gigantic columns, whose ornate capitals midway up the columns contain statues; the pale pink marble that faces the interior and exterior; and the forest of stone pinnacles that decorates the upper portions. While the interior is thoroughly Italianate in style, the exterior is covered with decorative tracery, similar to the Rayonnant style in Northern Europe.

The mostly-15th-century Certosa of Pavia, built by the rulers of Milan just south of the city, shows a similar extravagantly ornamented style, but now edging into Renaissance classical revival.

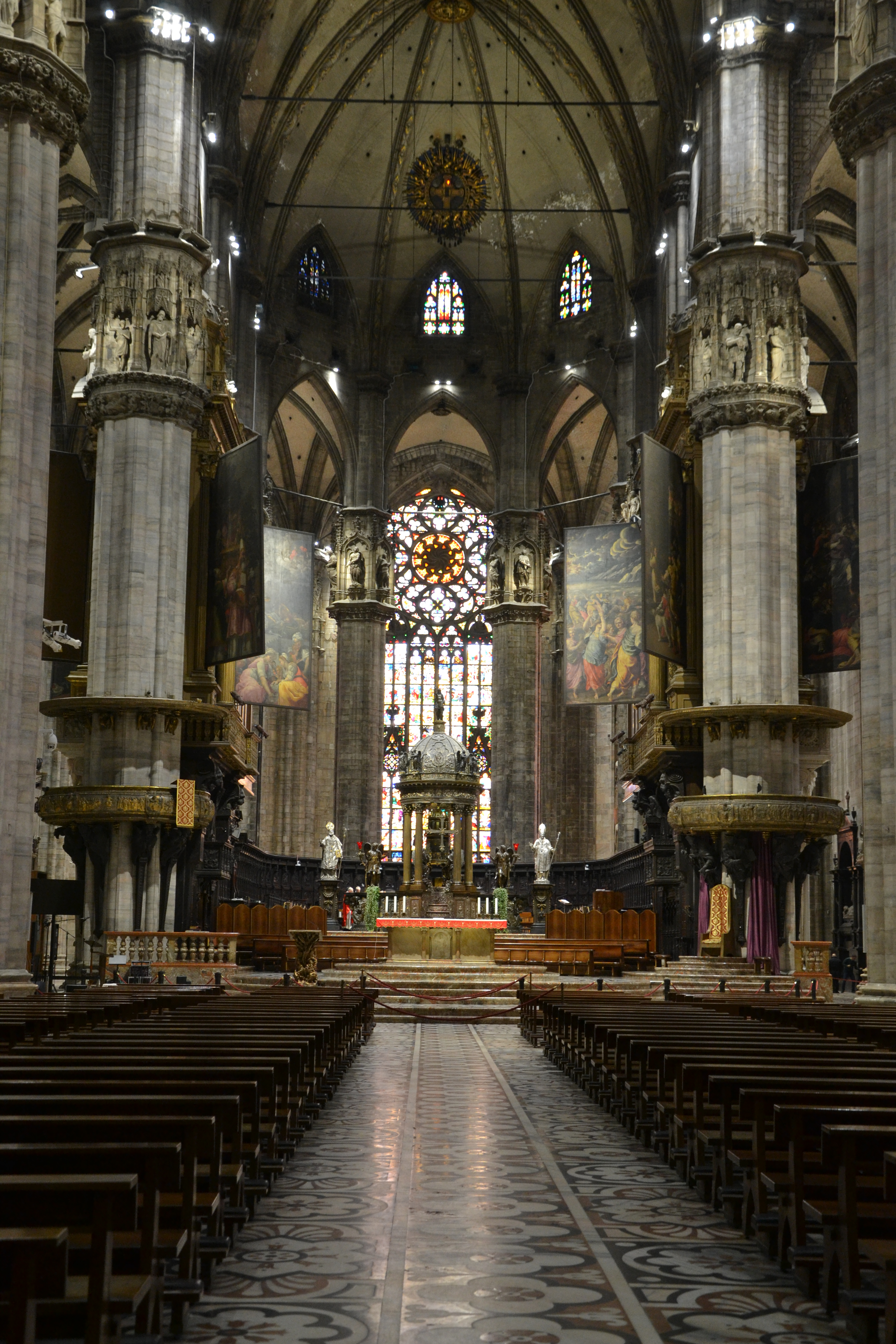
Nave of Milan Cathedral

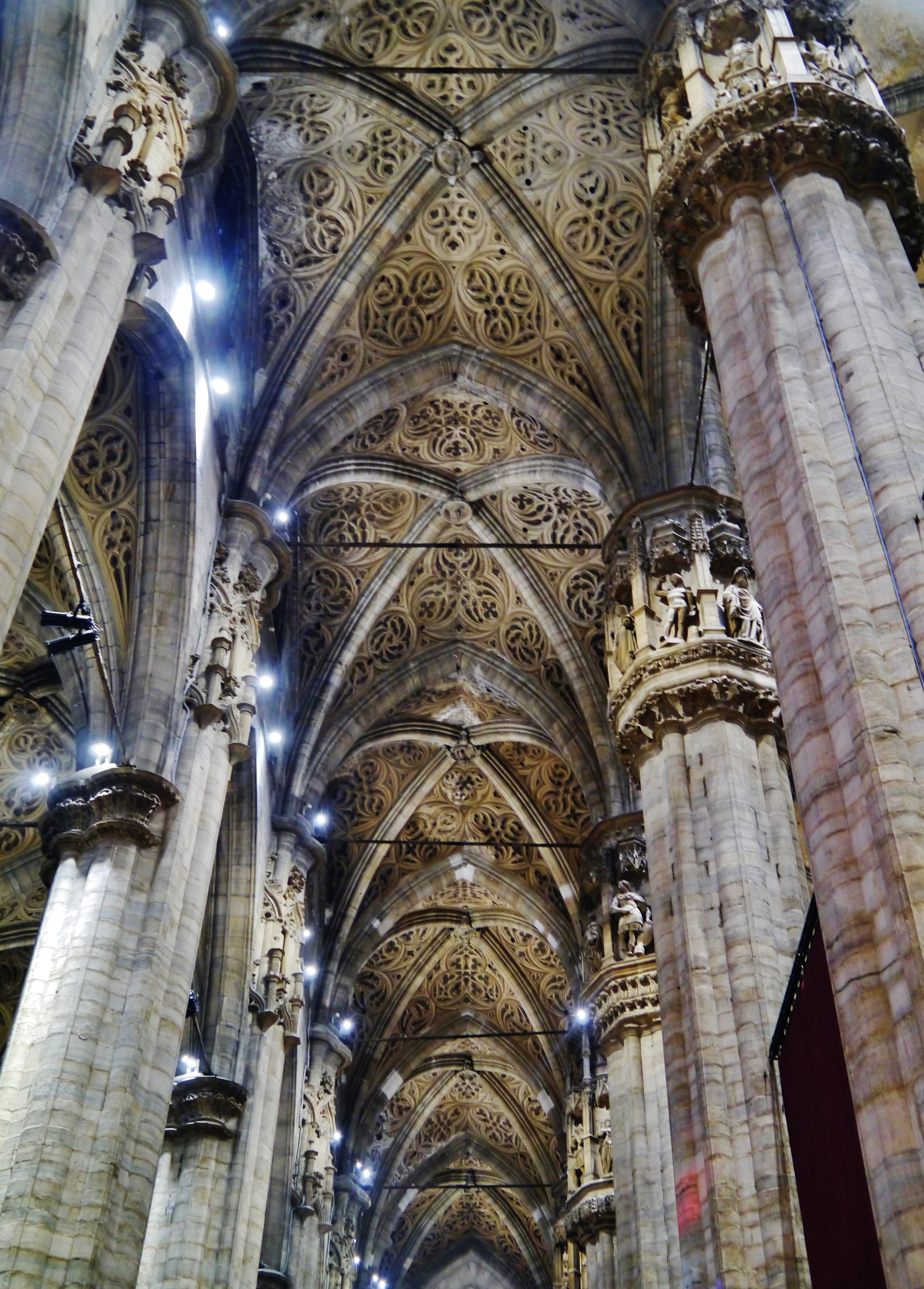
Vaulted ceiling and column capitals containing statues

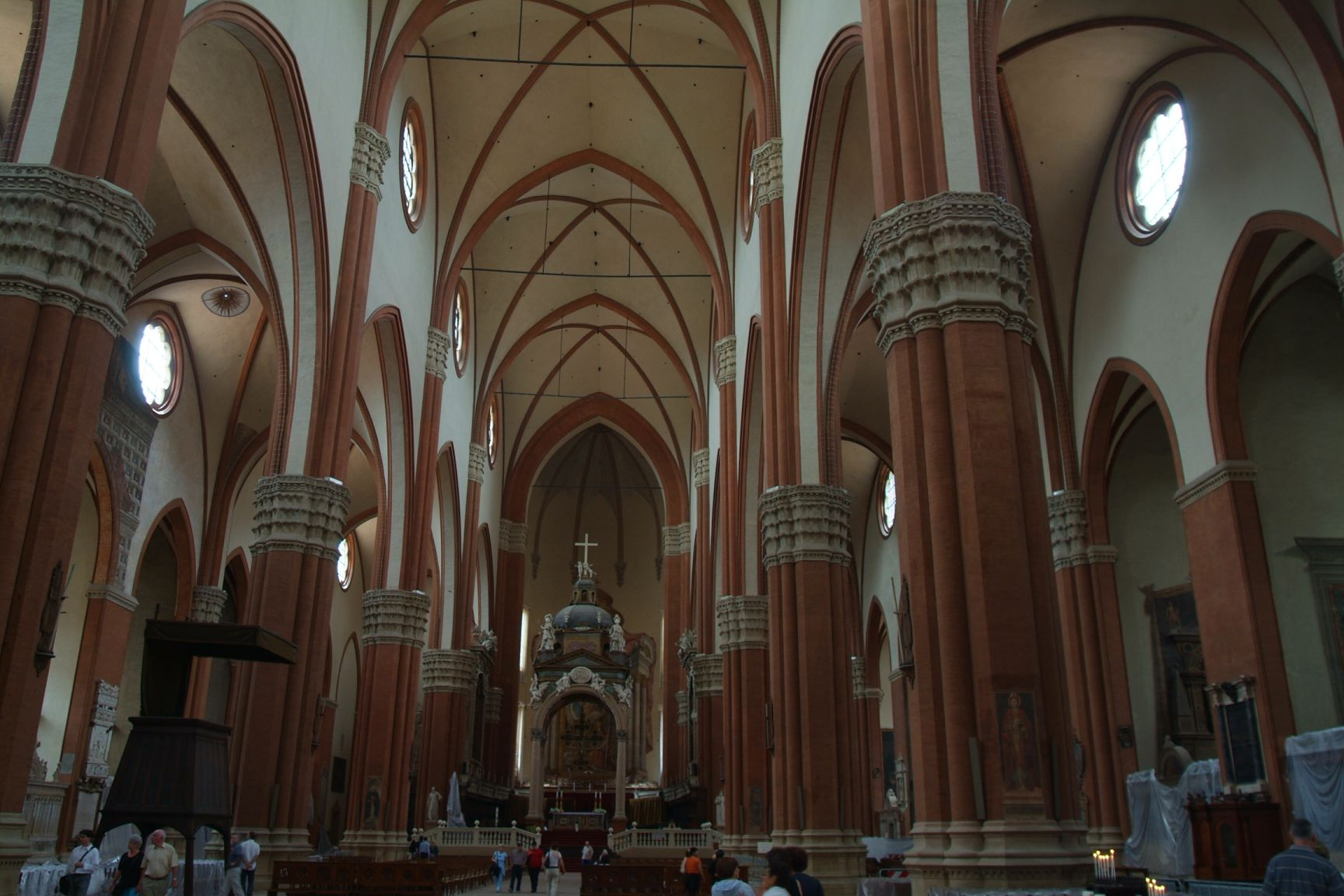
Basilica di San Petronio in Bologna

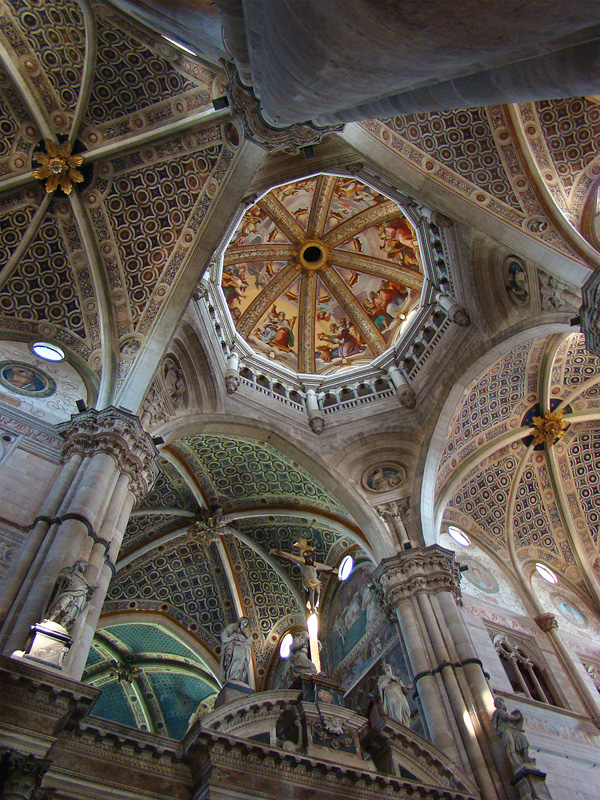
Looking up in the Certosa of Pavia
- Basilica of Santa Croce, Florence
- Palazzo Vecchio, Florence
- Basilica di Santa Maria Gloriosa dei Frari, Venice
- Basilica di San Petronio at Bologna.

== Venetian Gothic (14th–15th century) ==
The 14th and 15th centuries saw the construction of a series of new churches in the Venetian Gothic style, including the church of the Franciscans, Santa Maria Gloriosa dei Frari, begun in 1340. Built of brick, it featured three naves and an apse with six radiating chapels, and rib vaulting that sprang from massive cylindrical columns. The Dominicans also built a new church, Santi Giovanni e Paolo (15th century), with three naves separated by columns, and Gothic capitals, arches and decoration. A fire in 1419 badly damaged St Mark's Basilica, requiring the construction of a new south facade. It was richly decorated with an assortment of Gothic pinnacles and tabernacles.

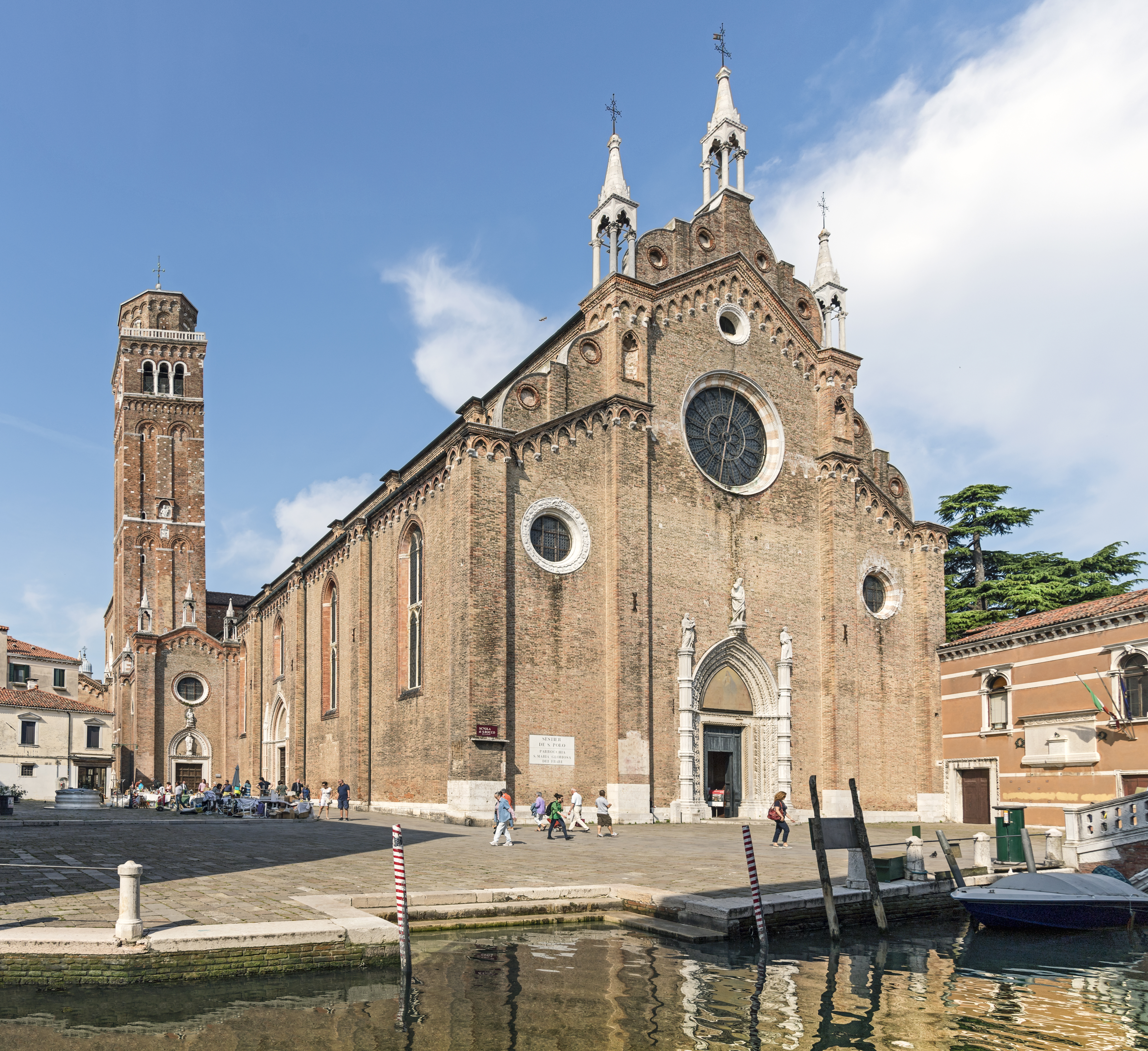
Santa Maria Gloriosa dei Frari (begun 1340)

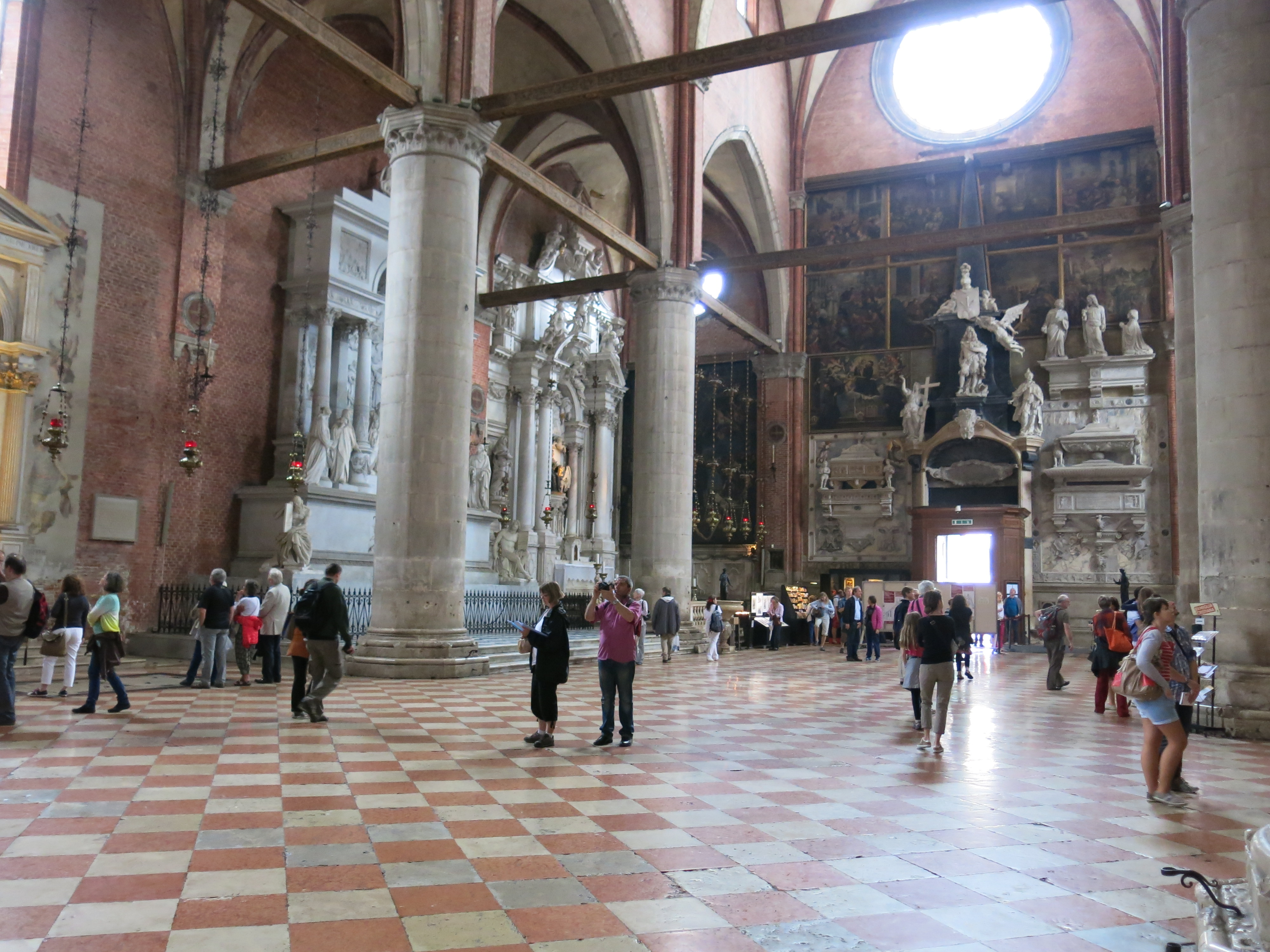
Interior of Santa Maria Gloriosa dei Frari

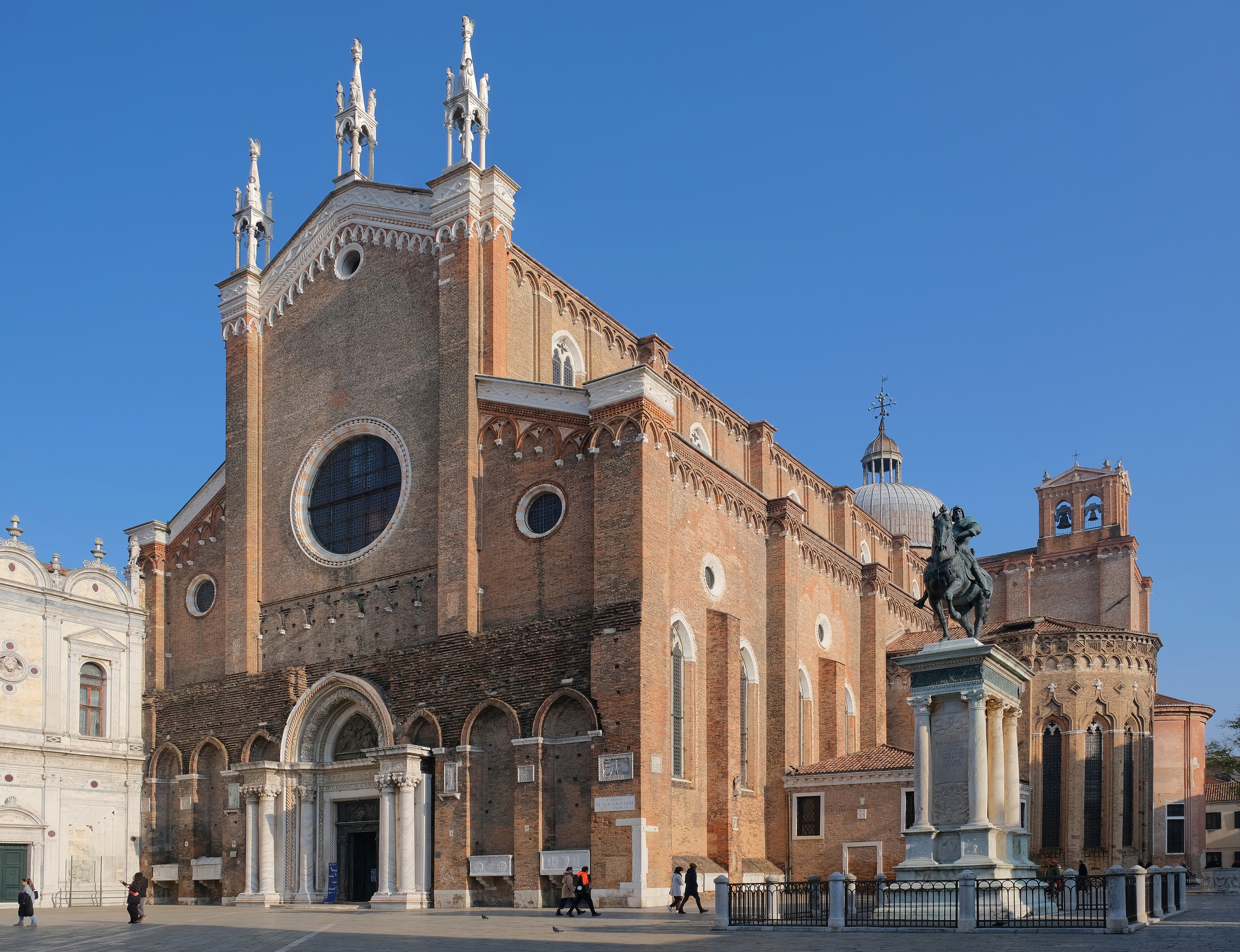
Santi Giovanni e Paolo (15th c.)

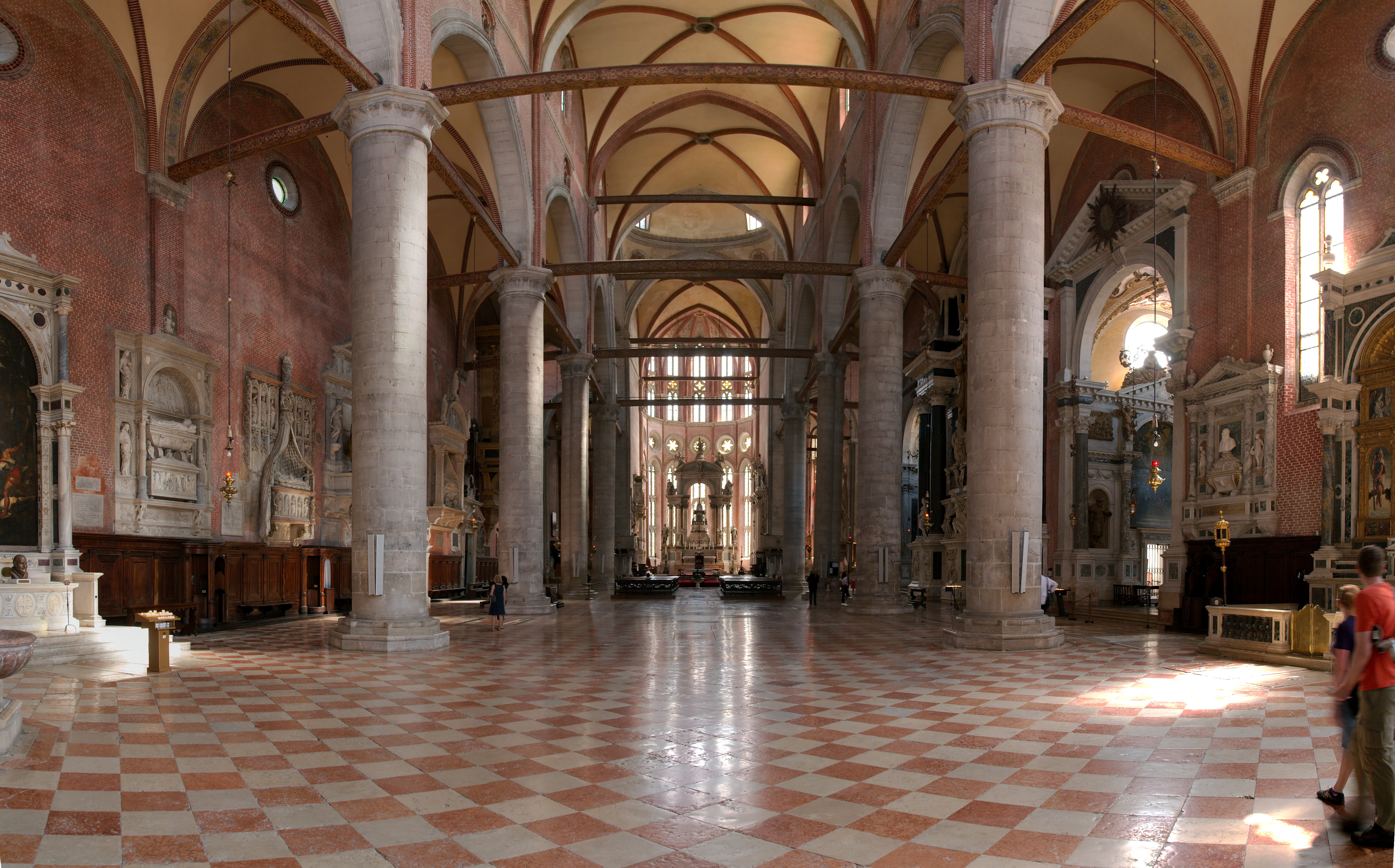
Interior of Santi Giovanni e Paolo

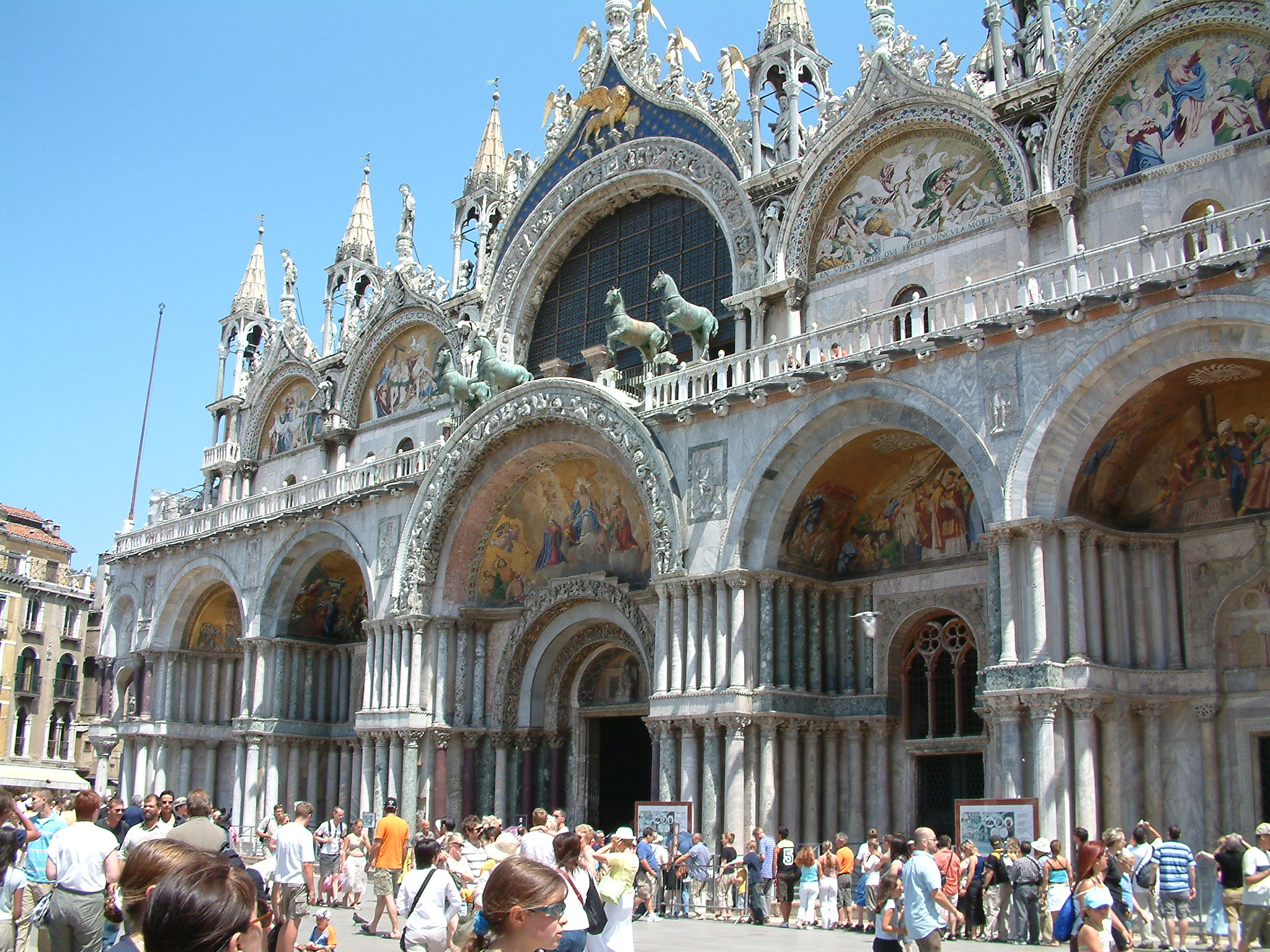
Gothic roofline of the south facade, St Mark's Basilica

The most original examples of Venetian Gothic were not the churches, but the palatial residences built for the Venetian aristocrats and merchants, The Venetian Republic achieved a peak of prosperity in the 15th century, especially after the fall of the Byzantine Empire in 1453, which made Venice the trading hub for the Eastern Mediterranean. The Doge's Palace, begun in the mid-14th century but greatly expanded in the 1420s, contained the Doge's apartments, council chambers, law courts, a prison, and the meeting hall for the lower house of the Venetian parliament. The ground and first floor had a double colonnade, while the upper floors were decorated with white and pink marble in delicate geometric designs.

Major examples of aristocratic residences include Palazzo Pisani and Palazzo Foscari, but the best-known example is Ca' d'Oro, or "House of Gold", built between 1421 and 1444 for Marco Contarini. It featured a portico and double gallery that were originally gilded, giving the palace its name.

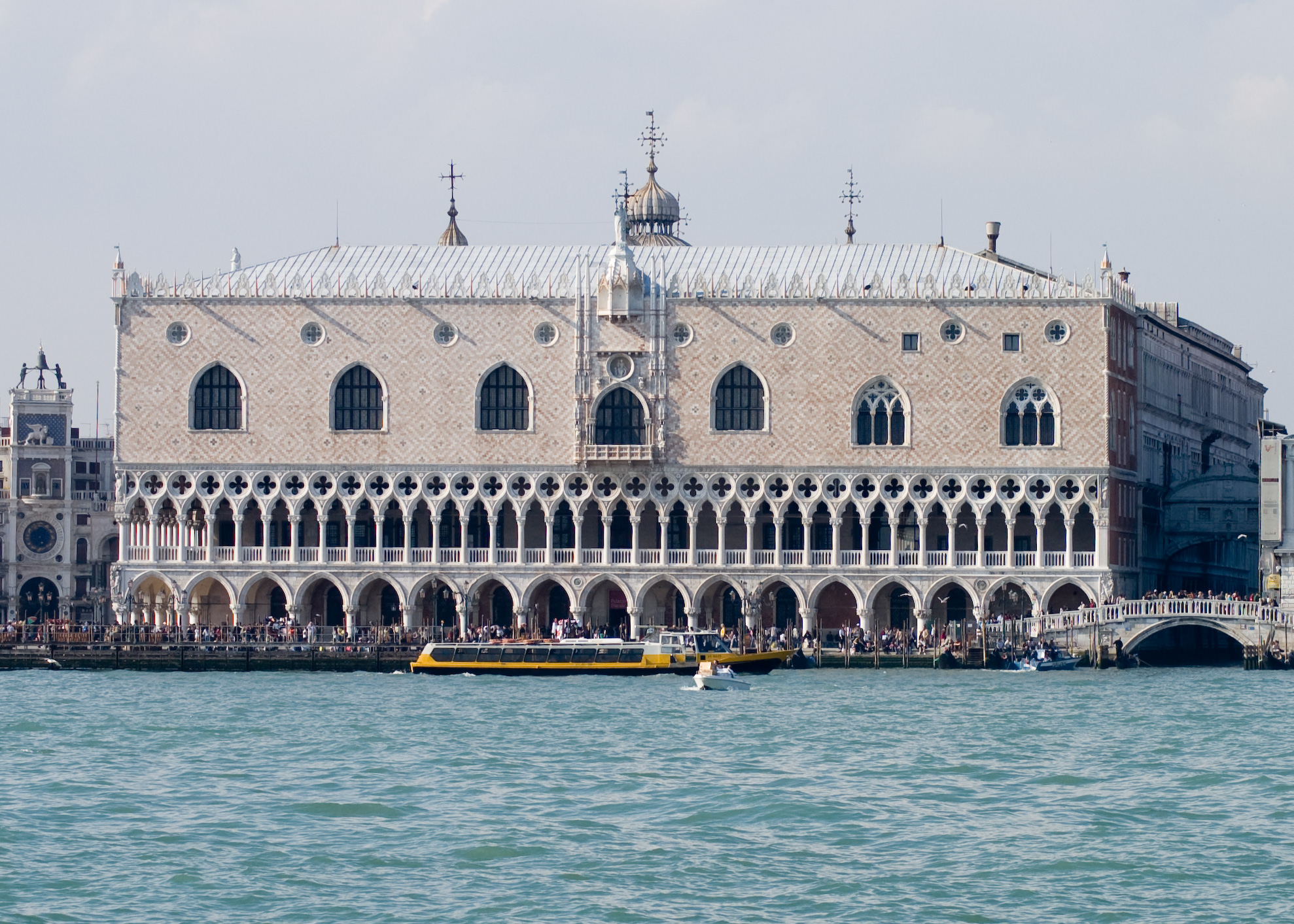
Doge's Palace, Venice (mid-14th – 15th c.)

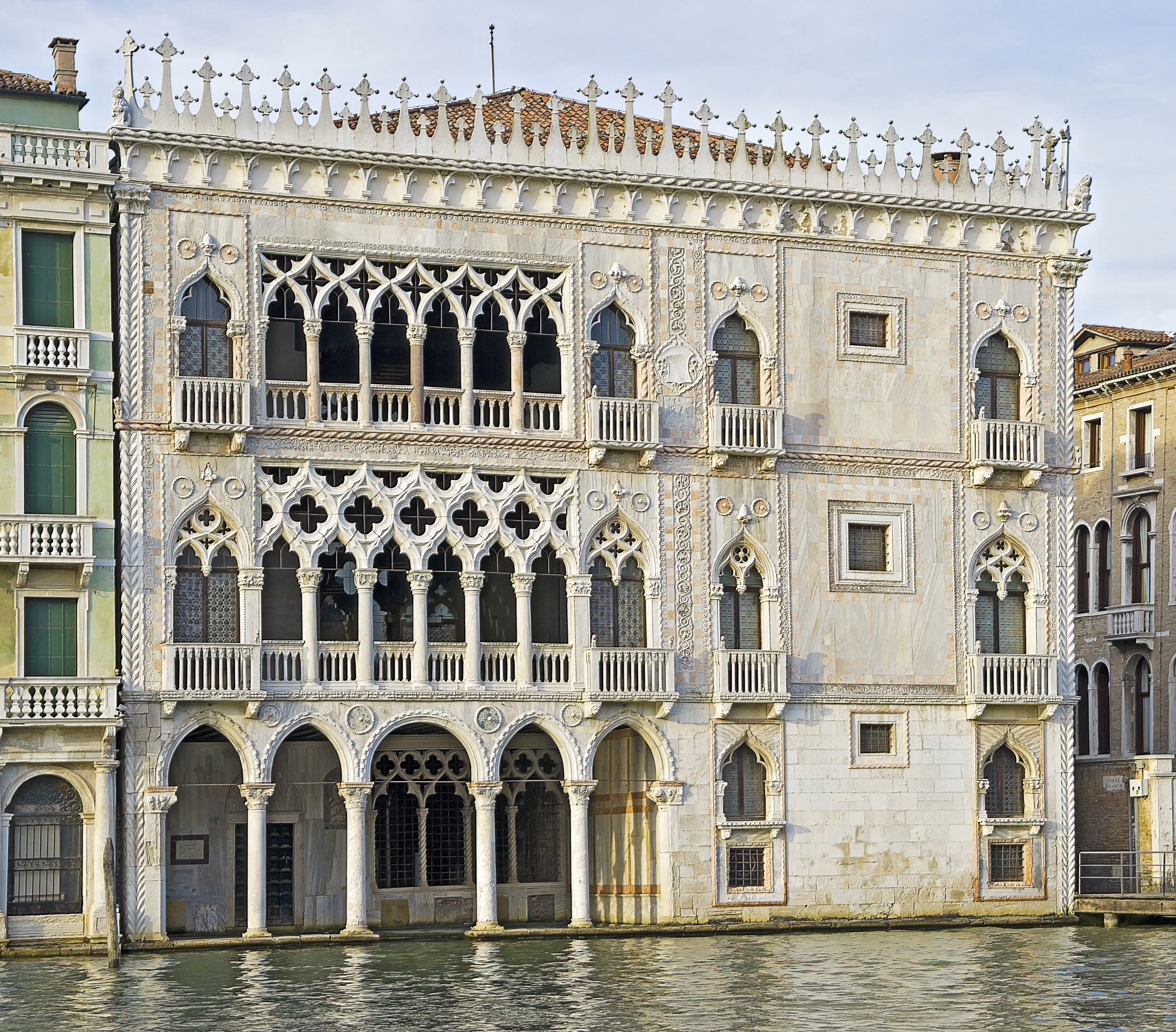
The Ca' d'Oro on the Grand Canal (1421–1444)

== Civic planning and secular architecture ==
Beginning in the second half of the 13th century, Italy produced more examples of secular Gothic architecture than other parts of Europe. The buildings were frequently constructed by the Capitano del Populo of each city, an organization that represented the guilds and the wealthy merchants of the city. Major examples included the Capitano del Popolo in Orvieto, the Palazzo Communale at Piacenza, and the massive Palazzo del Capitano, or Bargello, in Florence. Other Major examples are found in Siena, Florence and Venice. They illustrated the importance of Italian cities as banking centres, and increasing civic pride. These buildings were open to the exterior, with ground-floor loggias, large upper windows, balconies, and outside staircases, and frequently had large halls that were decorated with fresco painting.

Another notable example of Gothic city planning is the fan-shaped Campo, or town square, in Siena, which is dominated by the Palazzo Publico (1298–1348) and the Torre della Mangia, the tallest municipal tower in Italy. Florence constructed a similar municipal palace, the Palazzo Vecchio (1299–1310), though it retained many of the features of a fortress. A major example of a private Florentine palace is the Loggia della Signoria (1370s), next to the Palazzo Vecchio, whose round arches and roofline suggest the coming Renaissance.

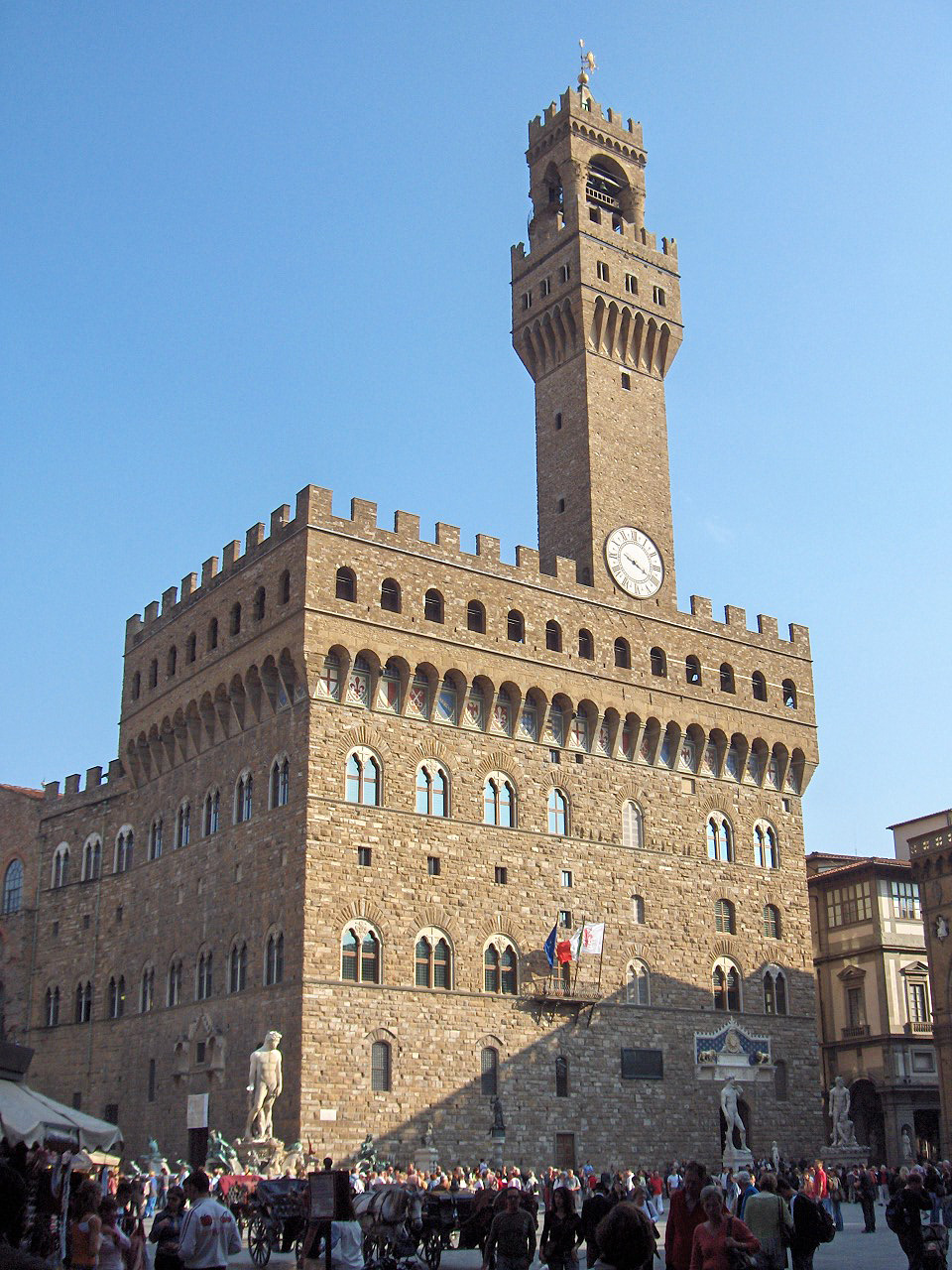
Palazzo Vecchio (1299–1310) in Florence

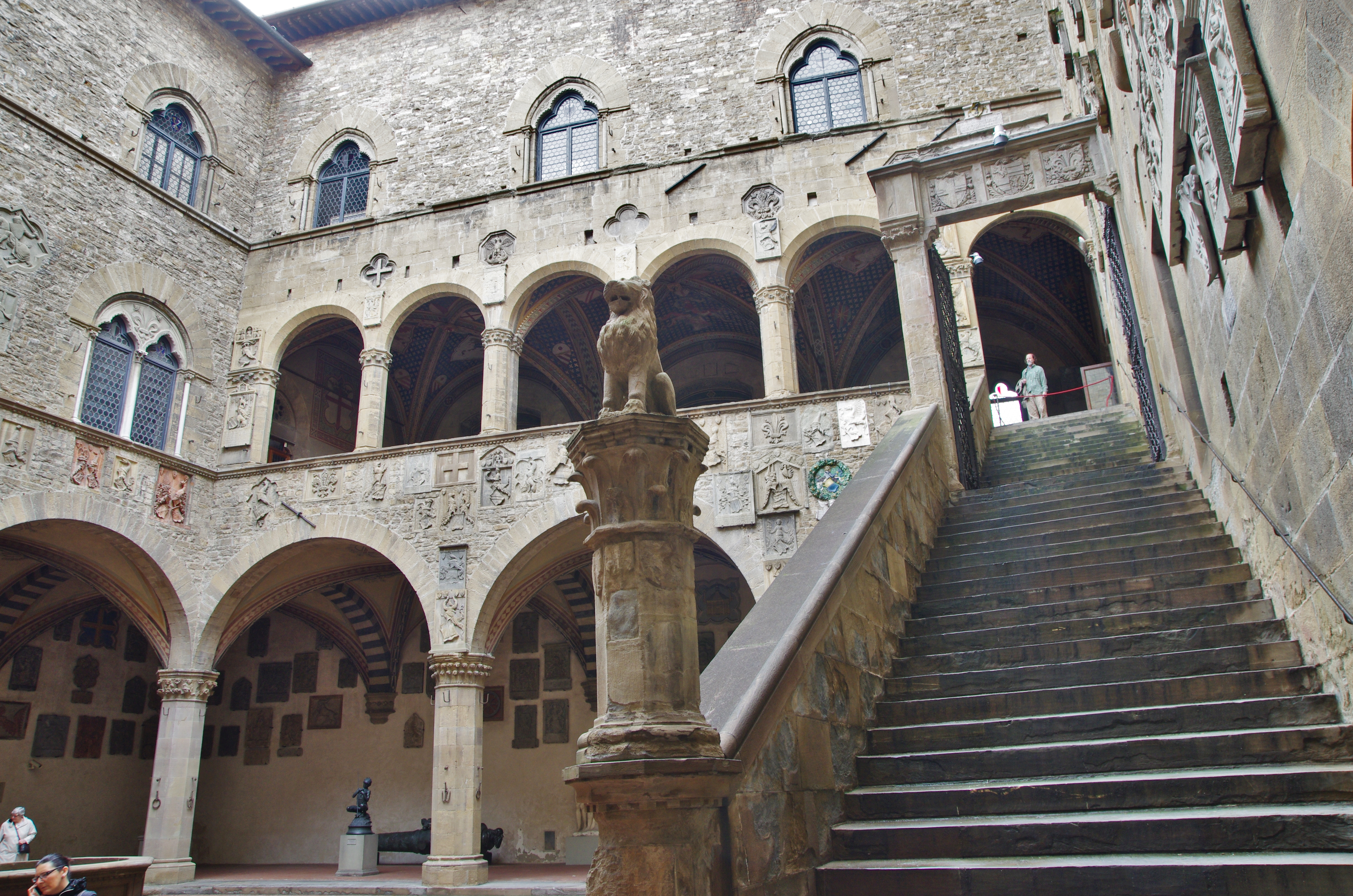
Stairs and inner courtyard of the Bargello in Florence (begun 1255)

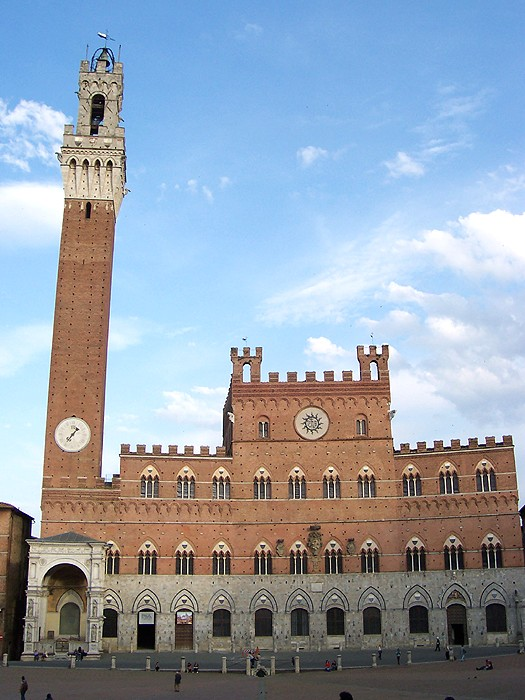
The Palazzo Publico and Torre dea Mangia in Siena (first half of 14th century)

== Castles and fortifications ==
In the Kingdom of Sicily at the beginning of the 13th century, an important civil and military construction programme was promoted by the Sicilian king, Frederick II, who was Holy Roman Emperor and through his mother Constance, Queen of Sicily grandson of the great Norman king Roger II of Sicily. The Emperor called upon the architects and craftsmen who had built the Cistercian monasteries to build castles and fortifications. The most important works include the Castel del Monte in Apulia and the Castello Maniace protecting the harbour of Syracuse, Italy.

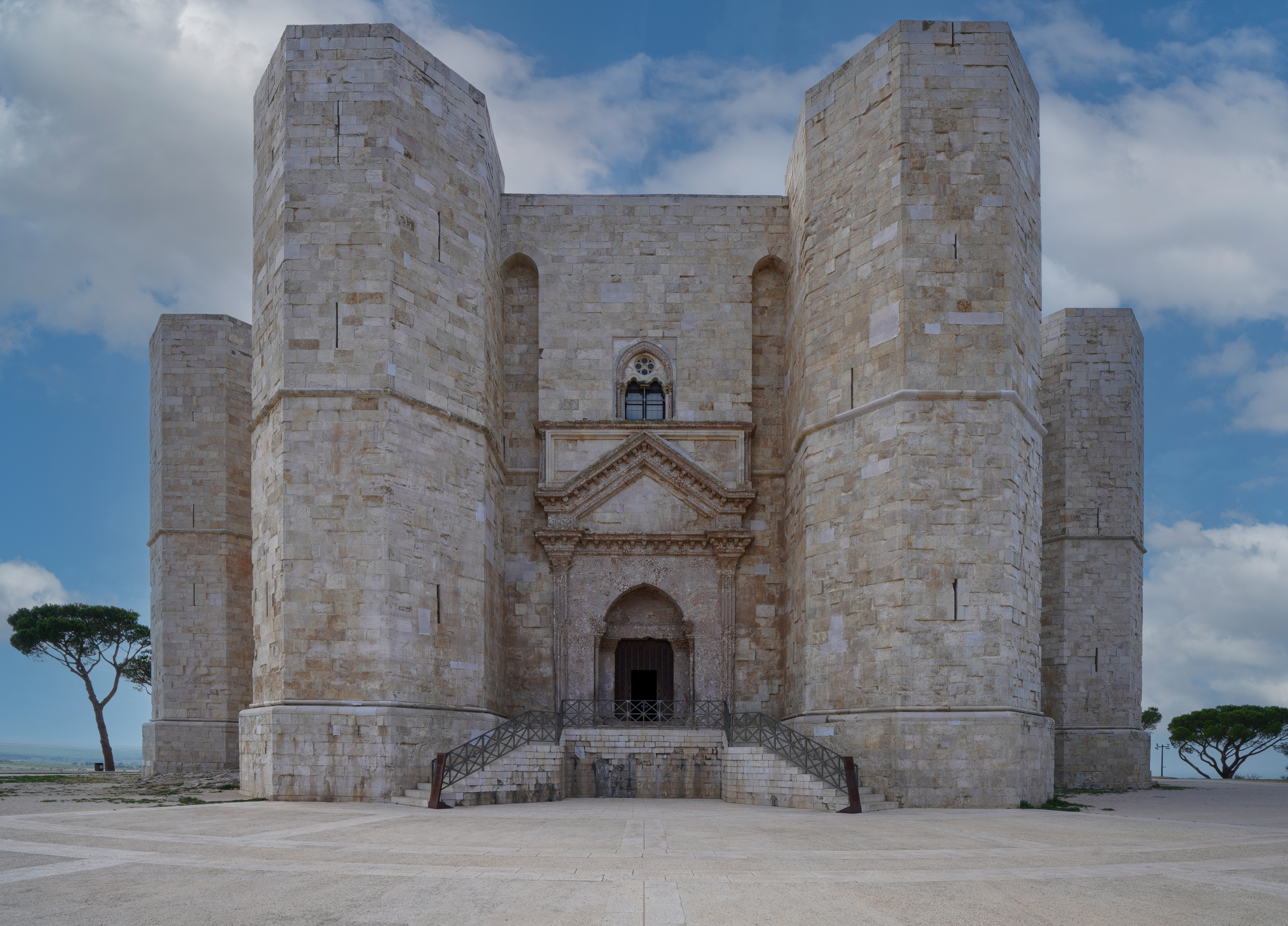
Castel del Monte in Apulia (1240s)

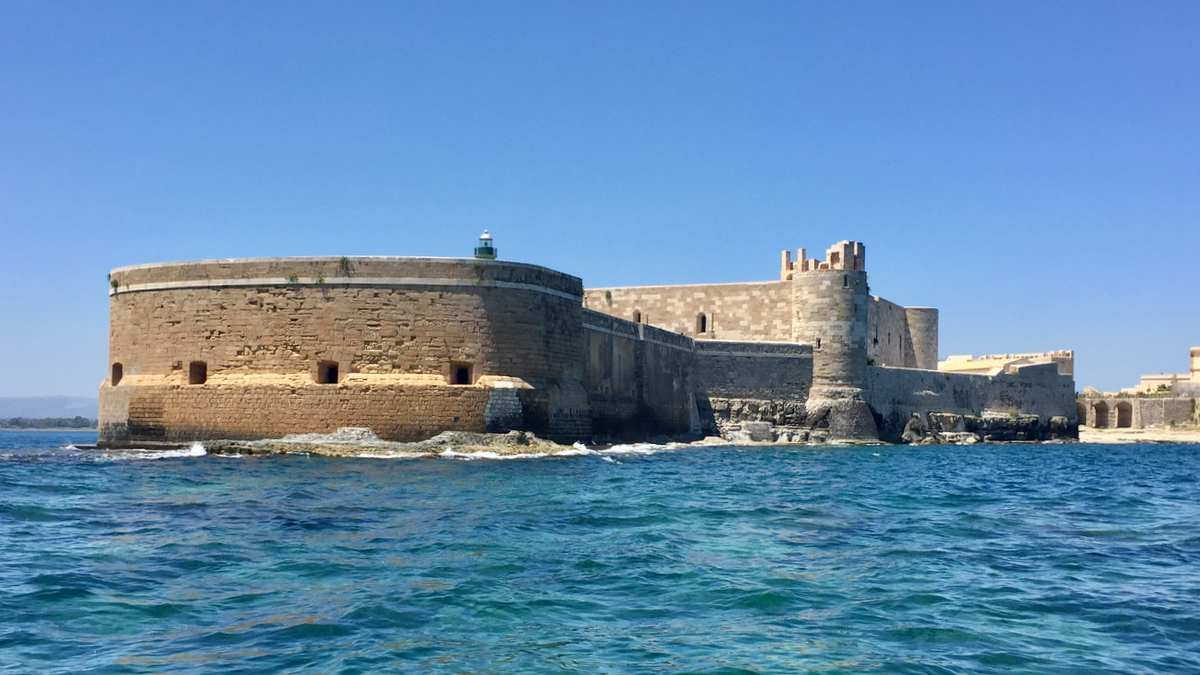
Castello Maniace in Syracuse, Sicily (1232–40)

== See also ==
- Gothic architecture
- Gothic cathedrals and churches
- Venetian Gothic
- Timeline of Italian architecture
- International Gothic art in Italy
- Gothic art and architecture in Pavia
- Gothic art and architecture in Monza

== Bibliography ==
- Chastel, André (2015) [1956]. L'Art Italien (in French). Flammarion. ISBN 978-2-08137-056-2.
- Martindale, Andrew (1993). Gothic Art. Thames and Hudson. ISBN 978-2-87811-058-6.
- Watkin, David (1986). A History of Western Architecture. Barrie and Jenkins. ISBN 0-7126-1279-3.
