= Gothic art and architecture in Monza =

Gothic architecture and art in Monza, Italy, 13th–15th centuries

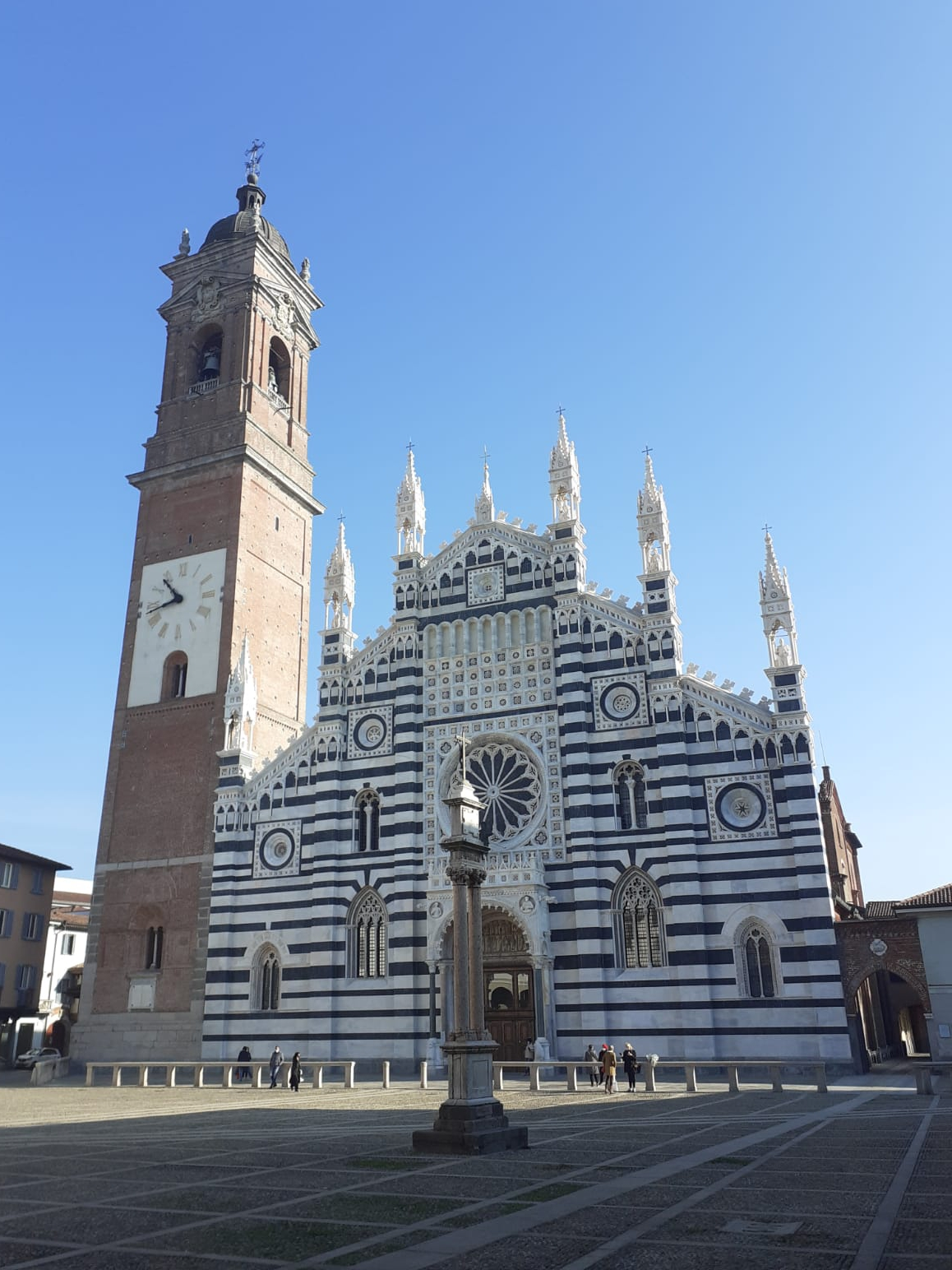
Facade of Monza Cathedral

Gothic art and architecture flourished in the city of Monza (near Milan) between the late 13th century and the first half of the 15th. During this period, the city, still proud of having been the capital of the Lombard Kingdom, hosted significant works by the Visconti, Lords of Milan, aimed at asserting their power over Monza and suggesting continuity with the kingdom of Queen Theodelinda. After this initial phase of artistic splendor, the city of Monza gradually lost importance, giving way to the capital of the duchy.

== Religious buildings ==
=== Cathedral ===
The most important work of the Gothic period in Monza is undoubtedly Monza Cathedral, built from the early 1300s on the site of the Church of San Giovanni Battista, the private chapel of the royal family under the Lombard Kingdom, whose construction was promoted at the time by Queen Theodelinda. The rebuilding of the church, decided by the city chapter and the Commune, was strongly desired by the Visconti family, recently lords of Milan, interested in asserting their power over what was the main center of the Milanese countryside and suggesting continuity between their rule and that of the Lombards.

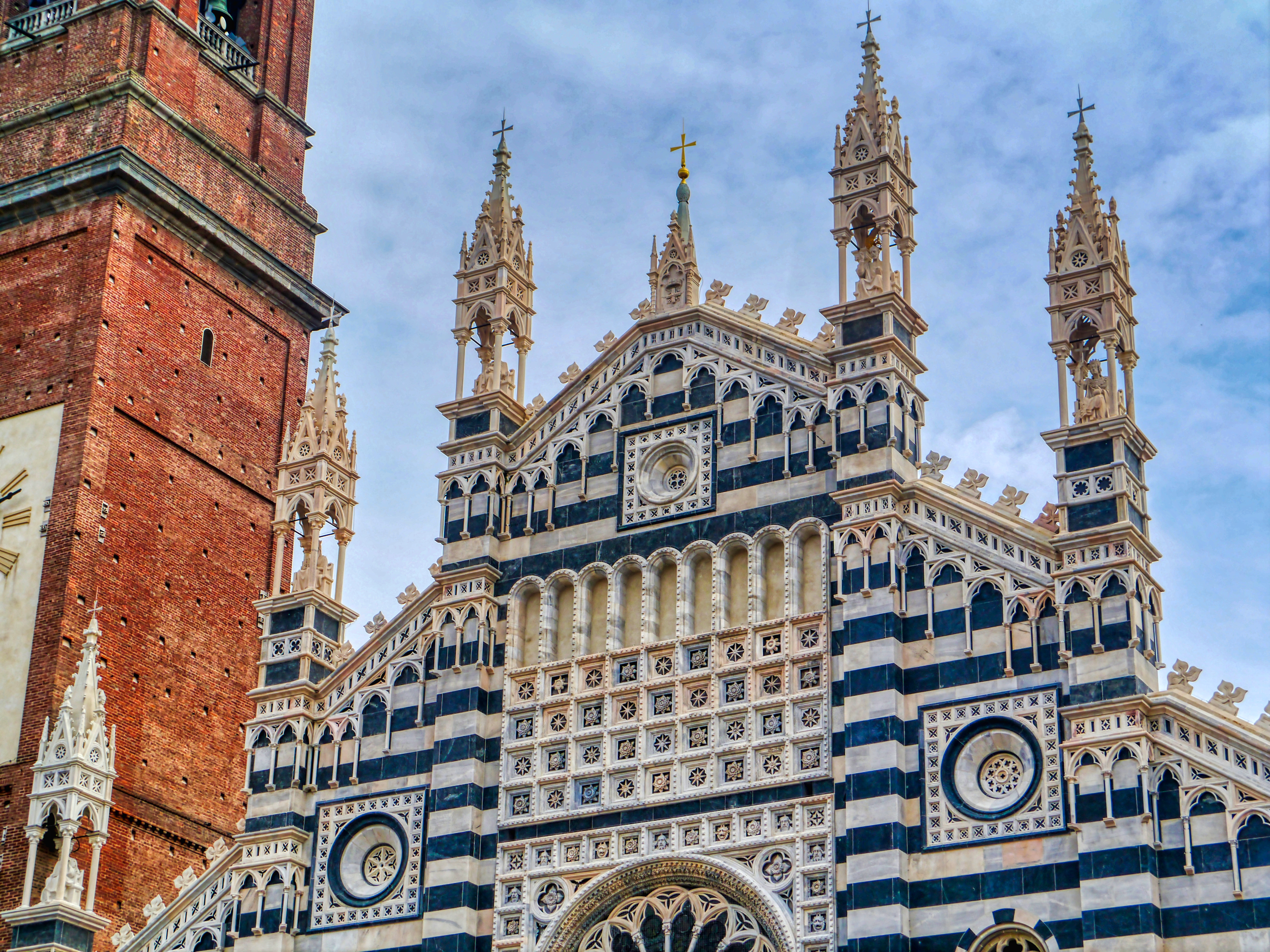
Detail of the facade

The facade with gables, designed by Matteo da Campione, one of the Campionese masters, was probably inspired in its proportions by the Church of Santa Maria del Carmine in Milan, and is divided into five vertical sections corresponding to the internal nave layout. The two-tone cladding, initially made of white and black marble arranged alternately, was replaced with white and green marble during 19th-century restorations. The only access to the church is through the portal of the central nave, preceded by a porch with a round arch, with the lunette decorated with statues depicting various saints as well as Queen Theodelinda, placed on a plinth with Roman statues dating back to the 2nd century. Above the porch is a copy of the 14th-century statue of Saint John the Baptist, currently preserved in the Museum of the Cathedral, and a rose window inscribed in a square composed of decorated panels: above it is a sculptural work in a checkerboard pattern that echoes the square framing with panels of the rose window, a solution probably borrowed from Tuscan models imported by Giovanni di Balduccio. The decoration concludes with aediculae, with cusped canopies, placed at the top of the buttresses containing statues of Saints.

Inside, despite extensive later reworking, there remains the pulpit made by Matteo da Campione, modified in the 18th century, of which the fourteen niches with Saints and the Christ Judge on the lectern are preserved.

Among the surviving 14th-century pictorial decoration, the frescoes of the Passion of Christ in the old sacristy, executed by a painter from the circle of the so-called Masters of Chiaravalle, Lombard painters with marked Giottoesque influences, can be mentioned. Later is the cycle of frescoes of the Stories of the Virgin and the Passion of Christ dating back to the early 15th century: originally in the Chapel of the Rosary, they were removed in the 19th century and placed in the sacristy. The cycle, attributed to Michelino da Besozzo, owes its creation to a direct commission from Duke Filippo Maria Visconti, as evidenced by the rich floral decorations with a gold background.

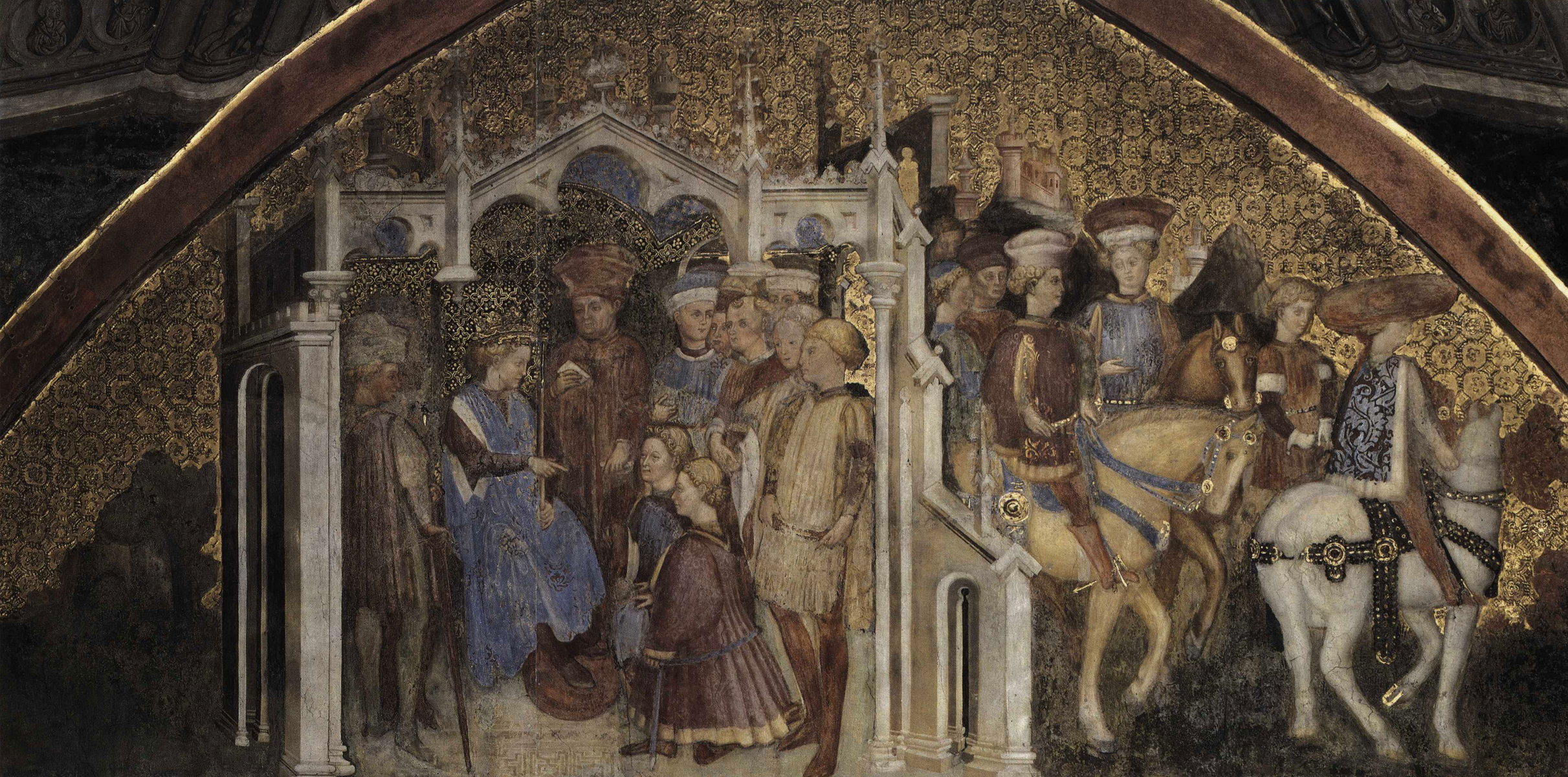
Frescoes of the Theodelinda Chapel

Separate mention must be made of the cycle of frescoes by the workshop of the Zavattari for the Theodelinda Chapel, one of the most important pictorial cycles of Italian Gothic, executed in the first half of the 15th century. The chapel includes a cycle of 45 episodes arranged on five horizontal registers, narrating episodes from the life of Queen Theodelinda taken from the works of Bonincontro Morigia and Paul the Deacon. From the first to the twenty-first scene, the cycle narrates the marriage of the queen to Authari, the fourth register the death of the latter and the second marriage to Agilulf, ending with the last scenes of the expedition to Italy by Constans II and the consequent victory of the Lombards. Overall, although executed by multiple hands, the work is coordinated by a certain stylistic unity: in all the frescoes, the background decoration does not represent natural landscapes but has gilded stucco decorations and plastic insertions corresponding to architectural elements.

=== Other churches ===
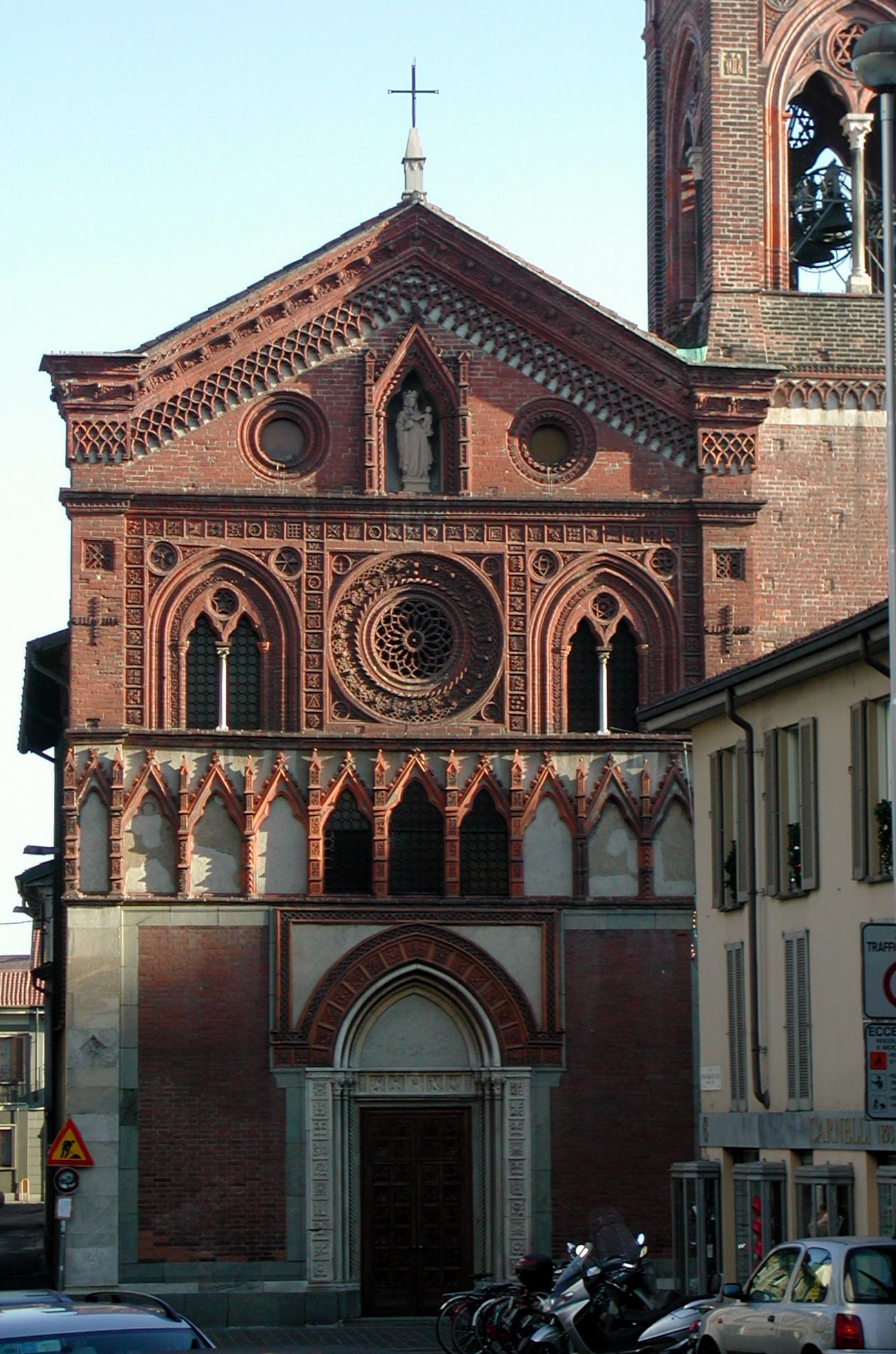
Church of Santa Maria in Strada

Another Gothic church of great importance is the Church of Santa Maria in Strada, built from 1348 and famous for its rich terracotta decoration. The facade is gabled, delimited by two buttresses, divided into four horizontal bands. The ground floor features a portal with an ogive decorated in terracotta, while the second floor has small aediculae also in terracotta with trilobed arches, a motif repeated in the bifore of the upper floor next to the rose window: both the rose window and the bifore are framed in decorative motifs with terracotta panels inspired by the decoration of the city cathedral. At the top of the facade is an aedicula containing a statue of the Madonna with Child from the school of Jacopino da Tradate.

In the bell tower are remains of a fresco of the Crucifixion reminiscent of the frescoes on the counterfacade of the Church of San Cristoforo sul Naviglio on the Naviglio, which, along with fragments of an Annunciation, has been dated to shortly before the early 15th century.

With a simpler architecture, derived from sober Cistercian Gothic, the Church of San Pietro Martire (Monza): the facade with gables is in terracotta, with a trifora as the only decoration. On the right side, there is an entrance to the church with a porch with a round arch covered with sloping roofs. The interior has a rectangular plan and is divided into three naves with cylindrical pillars: significantly altered in appearance by subsequent interventions, it shows traces of 14th-century frescoes, such as the Stories of Saint Peter Martyr, in a style similar to the so-called Master of Lentate, creator of the frescoes in the Oratory of Santo Stefano in Lentate sul Seveso, and especially the painting of the Annunciated Virgin with Saints Ambrose and Dominic made by a painter from the circle of Giovanni da Milano.

== Civil and military buildings ==
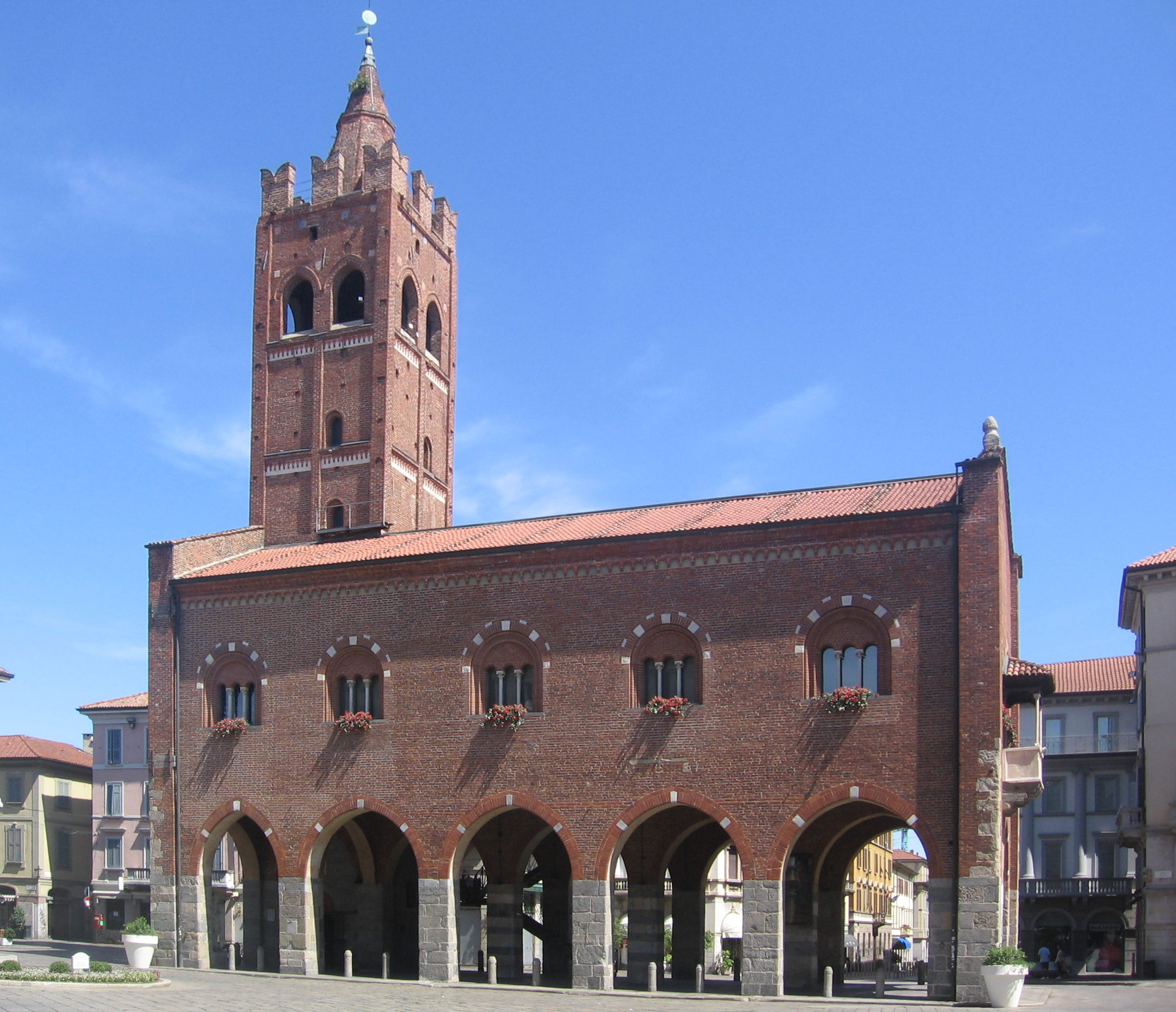
Monza Arengario

The surviving civil work from the Gothic period in Monza is the arengario, built on the model of the new broletto of Milan, following its longitudinal layout and the lower porticoed floor with the large chapter hall on the upper floor. The ground floor is porticoed with pointed arches on three sides with rectangular pillars and has a rectangular plan divided into two longitudinal naves. On the upper floor is the hall once used for public meetings, illuminated by bifore and trifore with round arches corresponding in number to the bays on the lower floor. A peculiarity of the Monza arengario is the bell tower ending with Ghibelline battlements, built to compensate for the lack of an adequate bell tower for the cathedral.

In the 14th century, the city walls were reinforced: the major work was undoubtedly the construction of the Visconti Castle, which architecturally must have resembled the castle of Trezzo d'Adda: of the imposing city defense system, only the Ponte Nuovo, built in stone with three arches, one of which is now buried, and the Torre Viscontea, erected on the remains of the castle using some of its elements, remain today. Among the ancient city gates, the Tower of Theodelinda can be mentioned, used as a passage to collect duties on goods entering the city from the Lambro river, made of terracotta with pointed arch monofore and bifore and trifore.

Another spurious naming – as buildings of the Gothic period cannot have any relation to Queen Theodelinda – is that of the "house of Queen Theodelinda", the Gualtieri House: among the few private dwellings remaining from the Gothic period in the city, it was made of terracotta and serizzo, within which, despite numerous alterations, the profiles of the original monofore emerge.

== See also ==
- History of Monza
- Italian Gothic architecture
