= Gerardo dei Tintori =

12th and 13th-century Italian religious founder and saint

Blessed Gerardo dei Tintori
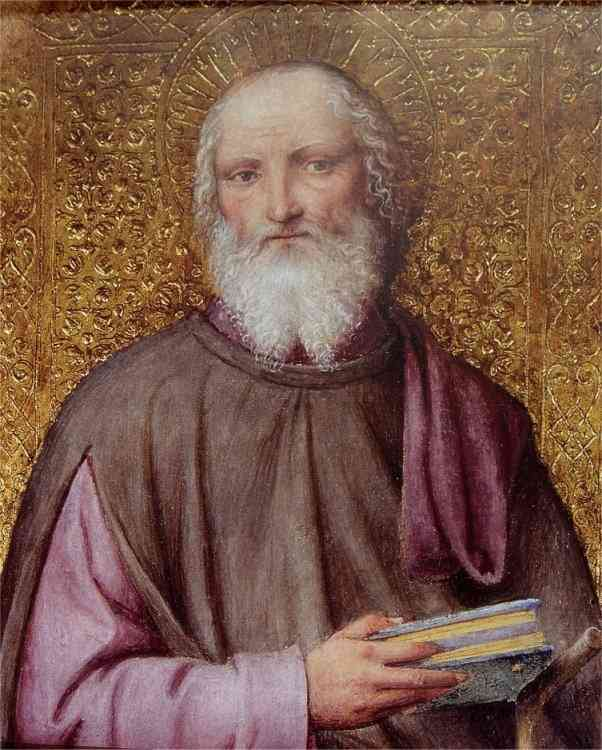
- Painting by Bernardino Luini

Mystic, Confessor, and Founder
- Born: Gerardo dei Tintori; 1134 (probably); Monza, Lombardy
- Died: 6 June 1207 (age 72–73); Monza, Lombardy
- Venerated in: Catholic Church
- Beatified: 1582 by Pope Gregory XIII
- Major shrine: Church of San Gerardo al Corpo, Monza
- Feast: 6 June
- Attributes: Stick with cherries, bowl with spoon
- Patronage: Monza

Saint Gerardo dei Tintori or Tintore (1134(?) – 6 June 1207) is a saint of the Catholic Church, joint patron saint (with Saint John the Baptist) of Monza in Italy, where he is particularly noted as the founder of a hospital.

== Biography ==
Gerardo's year of birth is not known with certainty: according to the Monza historian Bartolomeo Zucchi, it was 1134. The name "Tintore" or "dei Tintori" (Latin: de Tinctoribus) means "dyer" or "of the dyers" and very probably refers to the occupation of his ancestors. His family was wealthy but not noble.

After the death of his father, Gerardo used his inheritance to found a hospital for the aid of the poor and sick. The hospital was apparently established in Gerardo's own house, which stood on the left bank of the River Lambro, near the bridge now called "San Gerardino" and the church of the same name.

The founding of the hospital had certainly taken place by 1174. In this year Gerardo made an agreement with the authorities of the city of Monza and with the chapter of Monza Cathedral to define the legal and administrative status of the hospital: it was to depend formally on ecclesiastical authority, but in fact maintained substantial autonomy, while the municipal authority assumed the avvocazia (the protection of the hospital at law).

The hospital services were provided by lay brothers, who lived together in the same way as monks but without taking religious vows. Gerardo himself was a lay brother and also held the post of "minister", or director of the hospital. As appears from later documents, he retained this post until his death on 6 June 1207.

=== After death ===
Gerardo was initially buried in the churchyard of the nearby church of St. Ambrose (now the church of San Gerardo al Corpo), but his body was exhumed forty days later at the insistence of the population of the nearby town of Olgiate Comasco and placed in a sarcophagus next to the altar of the church. In 1740, the sarcophagus was replaced by a crystal urn with silver decorations, inside which the skeleton of Gerardo is visible to the faithful. The urn is now kept in a chapel at the far end of the south transept.

Gerardo's hospital continued his work until the 18th century, when the Austrian government merged it with the city's other health institutions. In 1946, the municipal authorities of Monza decided to commemorate his achievements and named after him the City Hospital which had been built in the 19th century and had formerly borne the name of King Umberto I. The new hospital built later, which also houses the Faculty of Medicine of the University of Milan-Bicocca, has kept the dedication to Saint Gerardo.

== Veneration ==
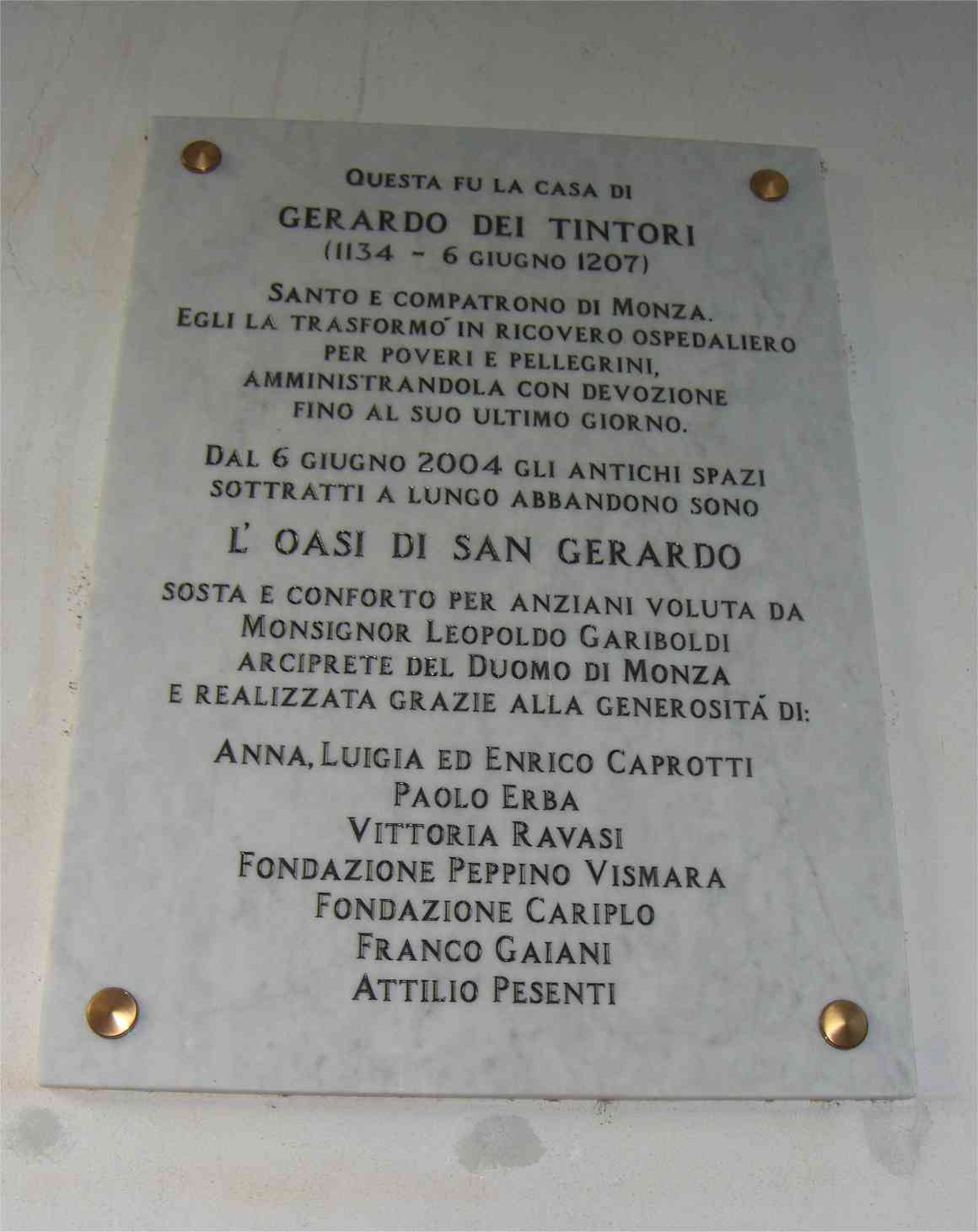
Commemorative plaque on Saint Gerardo's house

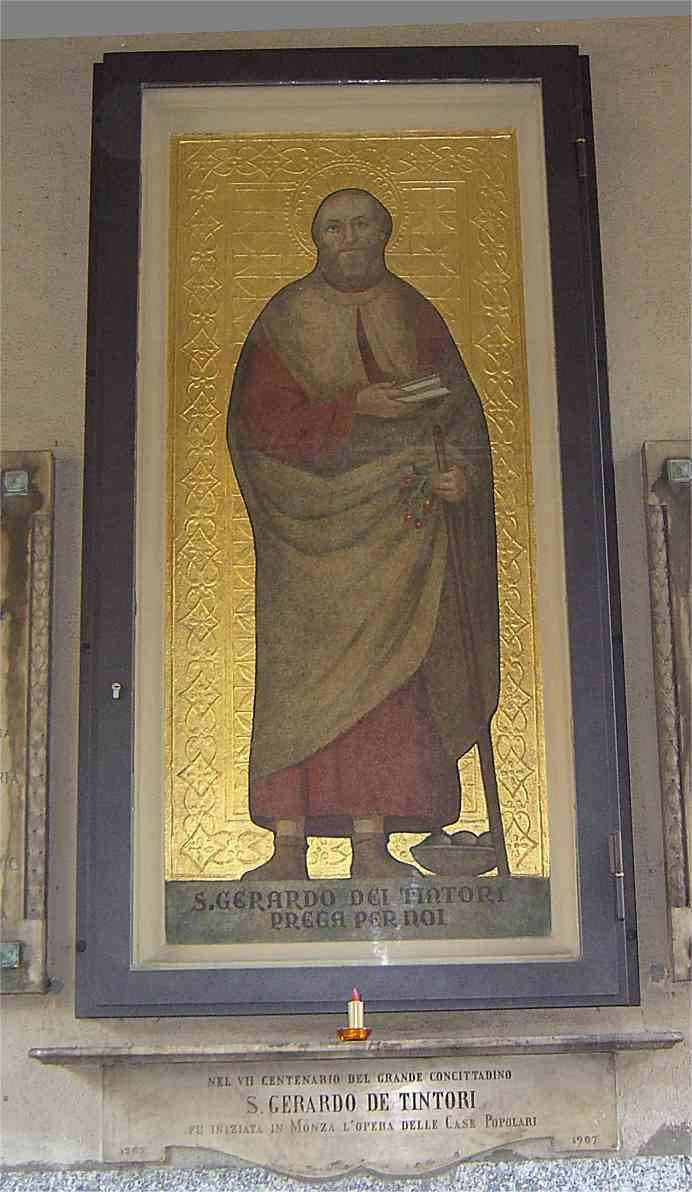
Altarpiece in the church of San Gerardo

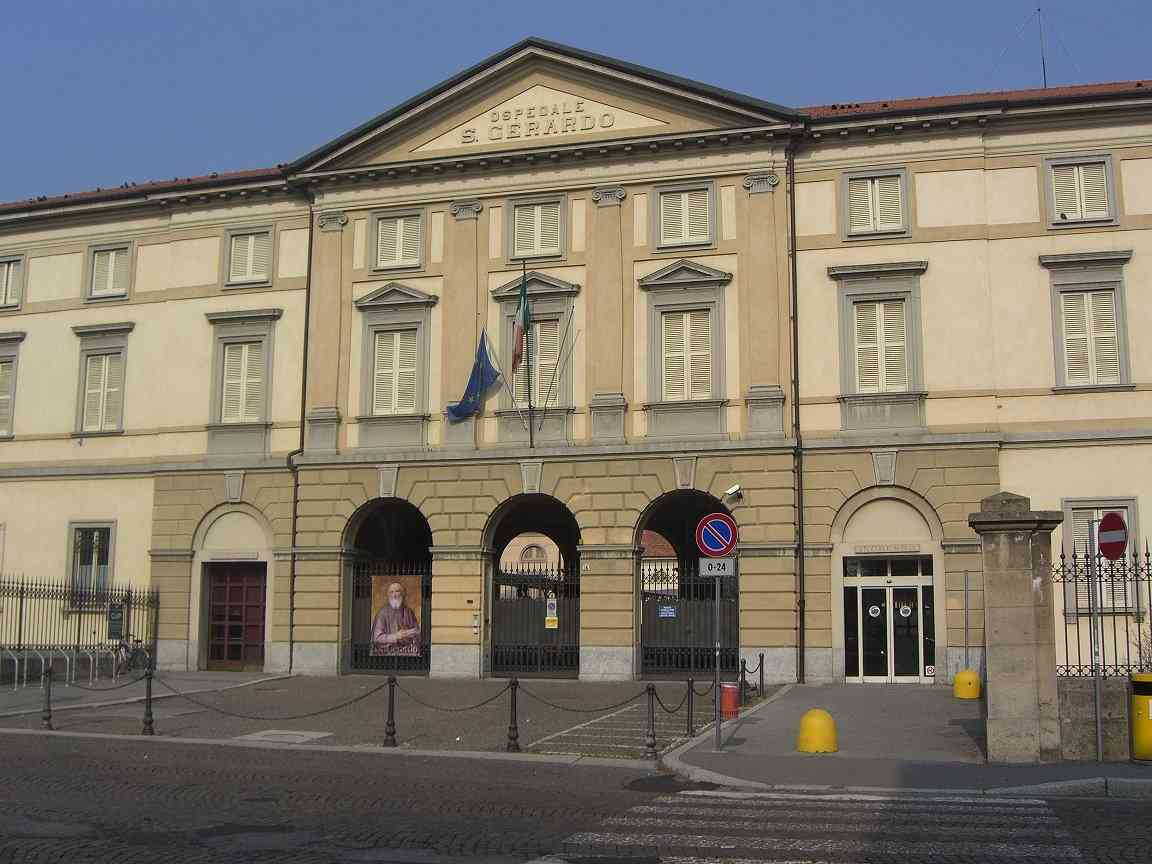
The Old Hospital of Saint Gerardo

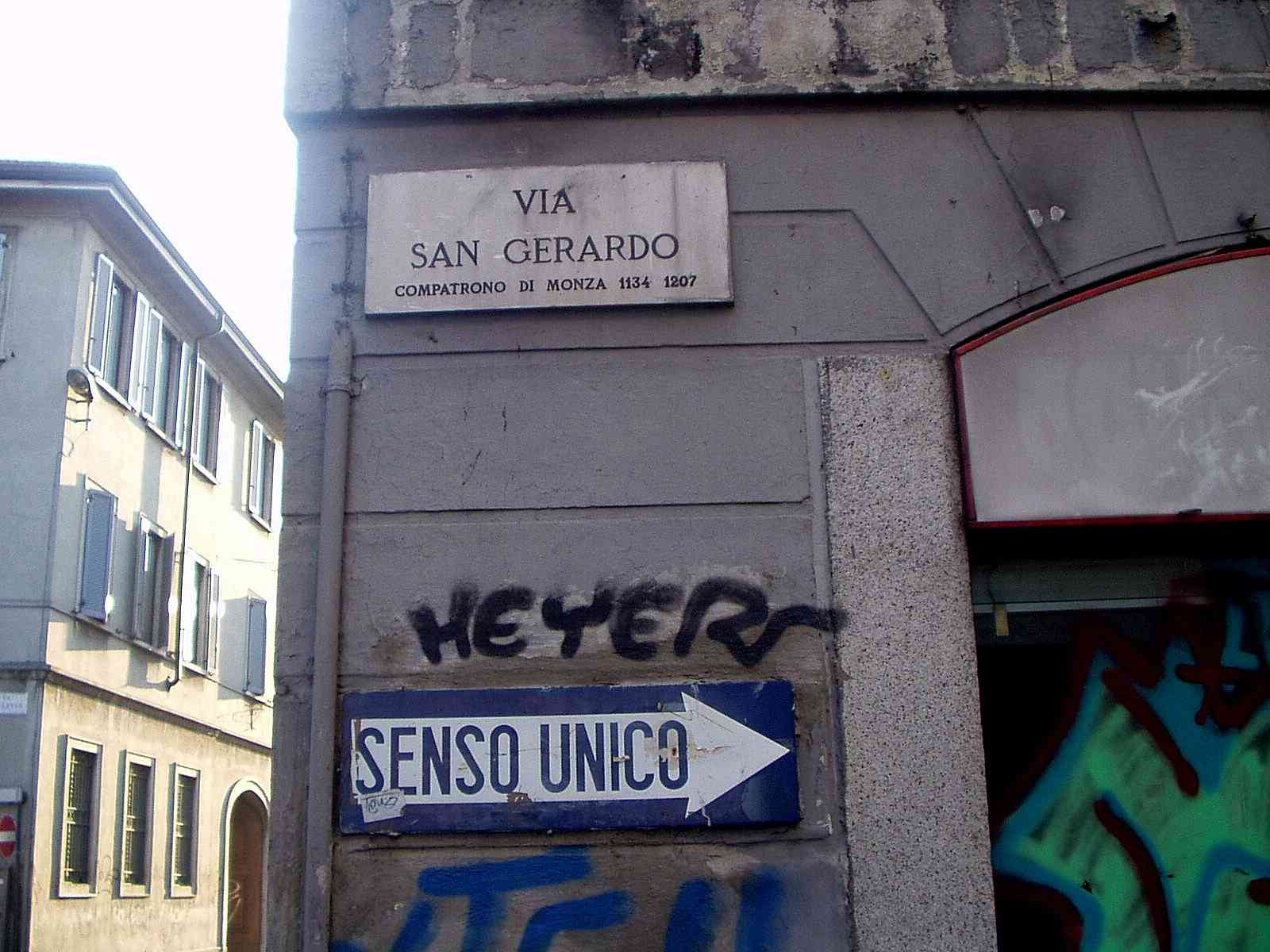
Via San Gerardo in Monza

The veneration of Gerardo began soon after his death: he is called "blessed" in a document of 1230, and "holy" or "saint" in one of 1247. After making an investigation, around 1582, Charles Borromeo, Archbishop of Milan, obtaining from Pope Gregory XIII confirmation of the cult of San Gerardo.

Monza has three churches dedicated to him: San Gerardo al Corpo, San Gerardino (also known as San Gerardo Intramurano), and Sancto Gherardo.

Saint Gerardo is invoked especially by sick and pregnant women. The traditional iconography represents him as an old bearded man, dressed in a tunic, with a staff from which hangs a bunch of cherries and at his feet a basket with bread, wine and eggs, or a bowl with a spoon, symbolizing his attempts to help the poor and the sick.

His liturgical memorial, inscribed in the calendar of Archdiocese of Milan, is 6 June, which is also the anniversary of his death. On this date, Monza celebrates his feast as the city's patron saint in the church of San Gerardo al Corpo, while at the nearby bridge of San Gerardino a festival takes place which prominently features stalls selling cherries, traditional iconographic attributes of the saint. A few meters upstream from the bridge, the statue of Saint Gerardo, standing on his cloak, is placed in the river, in memory of the most famous miracle attributed to him.

== Miracles ==
The traditions about Saint Gerardo, which are still well known in the city of Monza, were written down for the first time by the historian Bonincontro Morigia, who, a hundred years after Gerardo's death, was able to collect the testimonies of the people, according to which Saint Gerardo's prayers resulted in many miracles during his life and many others were attributed to his intercession after his death. The investigation ordered by Saint Charles Borromeo recognized over twenty, including the following:

- The most famous is certainly the miracle of crossing the Lambro: it is said that while Gerardo was praying in the cathedral, the river suddenly swelled and broke the bridge connecting the hospital with the city. The hospital faced the Lambro, and was in danger of being flooded: Gerardo spread his cloak on the water, climbed onto it and crossed the river to reach the hospital, where he ordered the waters not to enter the rooms of the patients. According to the report of Morigia, the water stopped at the hospital door for a few hours, until all were removed to safety.
- Another miracle is named after the bunch of cherries with which Saint Gerardo is represented: it is said that he often stayed in church to pray until late. One evening, to persuade the canons of the cathedral to let him stay past the closing time, he promised them a basket of cherries, although it was midwinter and cherries were thus unobtainable, which he nevertheless promptly gave them the next morning. This episode, however, does not appear either in the account of Morigia or in the investigation ordered by Saint Charles Borromeo, so it must be considered an invention of a later period (the first written document that mentions it is from 1695). Morigia reports instead that Gerardo went to pray in the cathedral very early in the morning, often even before the official opening time, and entered through the closed doors, as was well known to the sextons.
- It is said that, in a time of famine (perhaps in 1162), when the hospital supplies were almost exhausted, Gerardo ordered that all that remained should be distributed to the poor, and then took to prayer: the steward found the barn so full that he could not even open the door and the cellar filled with barrels of good wine.
- Saint Gerardo is also venerated by the faithful of Olgiate Comasco for another miracle: he had been dead for forty days when the citizens were afflicted by a serious disease called "syncope" (it is uncertain exactly what disease it was), and on the advice of a hermit went on a pilgrimage to his tomb in Monza, when the disease disappeared. In gratitude they vowed to repeat the pilgrimage every year in perpetuity, and indeed it still takes place every 25 April. The people of Olgiate also spread the cult of Saint Gerardo into nearby towns: in 1740 the historian Antonio Francesco Frisi of Monza lists over 14 places where the saint was venerated, including Como and Mendrisio.
- To Saint Gerardo were attributed different cures. Particularly important among them is the healing of Nazario of Sesto (Sesto San Giovanni), to which Morigia refers (and in fact claims to have witnessed in person): Nazario while drunk fell under the wheels of a heavy cart which crushed his throat; he was believed dead, but awoke after an hour perfectly healthy.
- Morigia further reports a rather curious event, which also was considered miraculous: in 1324, during a war, some soldiers went up on the roof of the Church of San Gerardo and began to dismantle for firewood. Faced with protests from the citizens, one of the soldiers swore and offended the saint, whereupon all immediately fell from the roof and the blasphemer died instantly.
- Morigia also describes a miracle that features a woman in San Fruttuoso (a district of Monza): a married woman named Onorina of Cascine Bovati had grown old and lost her sight, but insisted that her relatives take her to the church where Gerardo's relics were preserved. Conducted to the tomb, she kissed the saint's mantle and at once regained her sight. The miracle was witnessed by a priest, chaplain of the church of St. John and confessor of the woman.

== Bibliography ==
- Bertazzini, P F, and Fassina, G., 1999: Gerardo Tintore, il santo di Monza. Lions Club Monza Host
- Fassina, G. (ed.), 1992: Gerardo dei Tintori, cittadino e patrono di Monza. Società di studi monzesi
- Milazzo, F., 2007: San Gerardo e la sua chiesa in Monza, Storia e Arte. Parrocchia di San Gerardo al Corpo
- Various authors, 1979: Gerardo Tintore, il santo di Monza. Parrocchia di San Gerardo al Corpo
