= Lea Garofalo =

Italian victim of the 'Ndrangheta

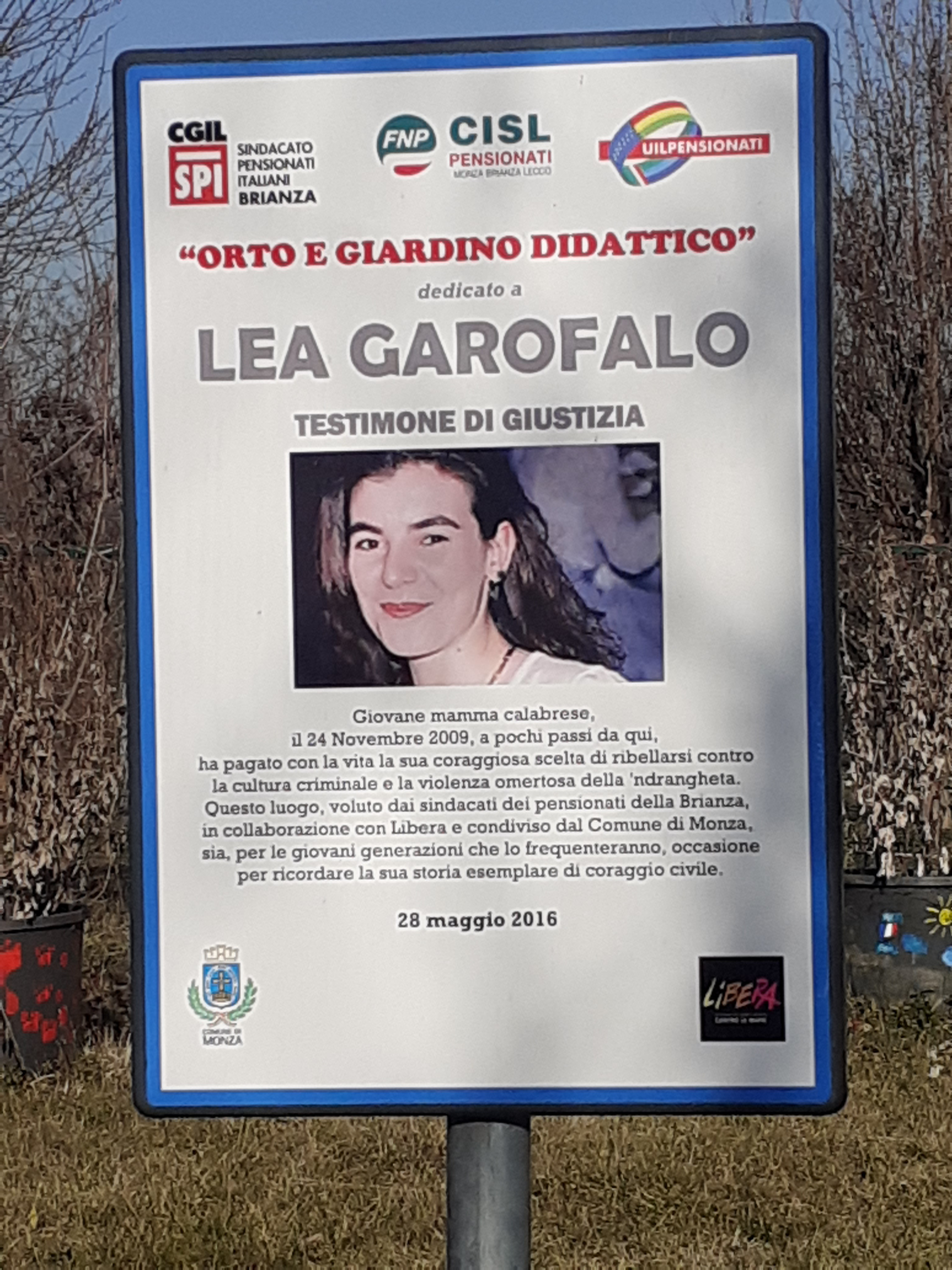
- Tribute poster for Garofalo in the Orto e Giardino Didattico dedicated to her in Monza
- Born: 24 April 1974; Petilia Policastro, Calabria, Italy
- Died: 24 November 2009 (aged 35); Milan, Italy
- Cause of death: Murdered by the 'Ndrangheta

Lea Garofalo (24 April 1974 – 24 November 2009) was an Italian justice collaborator who became a victim of the 'Ndrangheta, the Calabrian Mafia. Initially, it was reported that her body was dissolved in acid, but it was later revealed that she was murdered and her body burned. Her collaboration with authorities against the 'Ndrangheta and her tragic fate have made her a symbol of resistance against organized crime in Italy.

Garofalo's life and murder are depicted in The Good Mothers, a British-Italian crime drama television series. The Good Mothers premiered on Disney+ and Hulu on 5 April 2023.

== Background and Family Ties ==
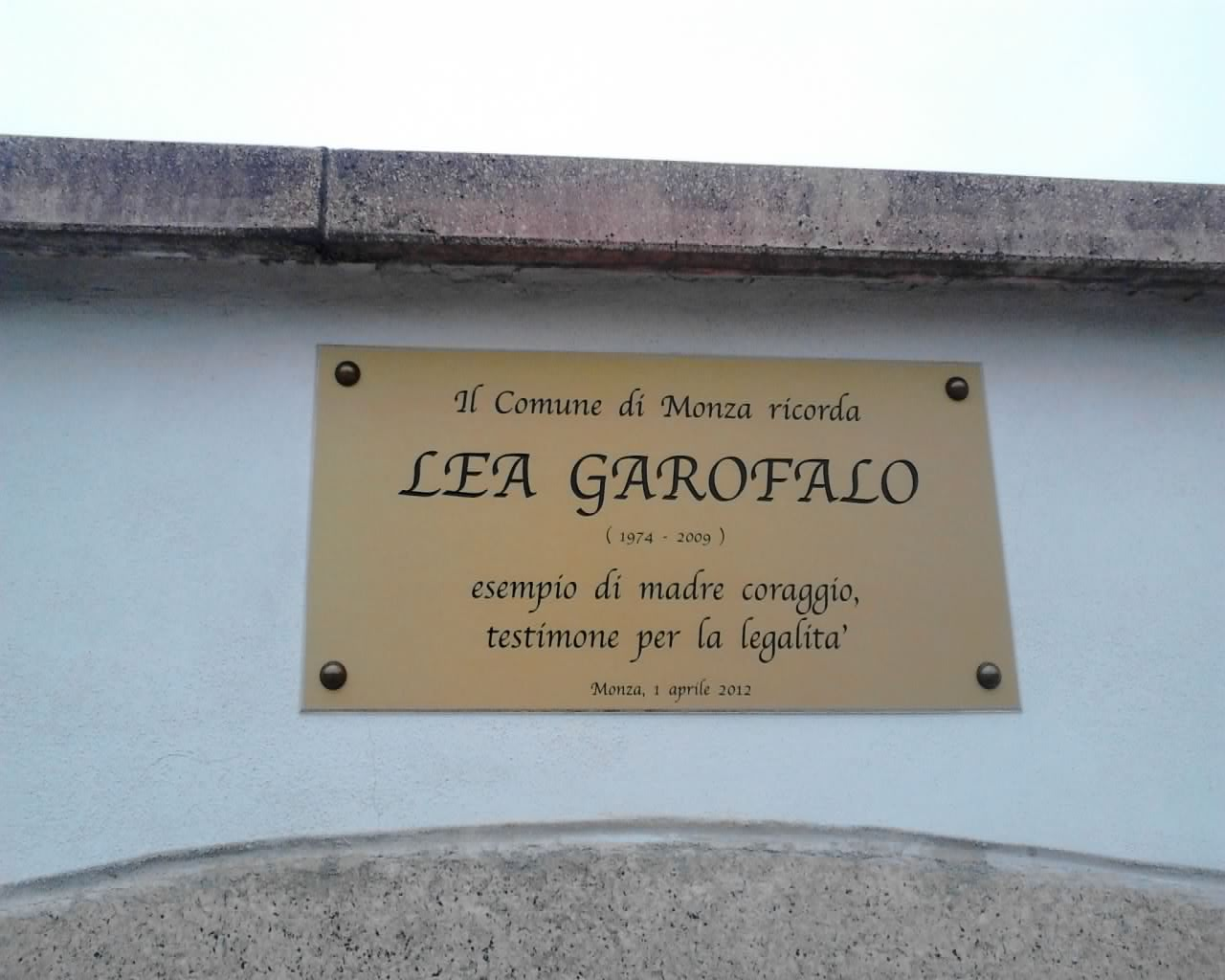
The Lea Garofalo commemorative plaque at the San Fruttuoso Cemetery, in Monza

Lea Garofalo was the sister of Floriano Garofalo, a boss within the 'Ndrangheta whose criminal operations were based in Petilia Policastro. She was also the partner of Carlo Cosco, with whom she had a daughter, Denise.

Floriano Garofalo was arrested by the Carabinieri in Milan on 7 May 1996, during a raid in Via Montello 6. Nine years after his arrest and initial acquittal, Floriano was killed in an ambush in Pagliarelle, a hamlet of Petilia Policastro, on 7 June 2005.

== Collaboration with Justice and Protection Program ==
In 2002, Lea Garofalo decided to become a justice collaborator, providing significant information to Italian authorities regarding the internal conflict between the Garofalo and Cosco families, both deeply involved in the 'Ndrangheta. She was interviewed by prosecutor Salvatore Dolceto, revealing details of drug trafficking activities orchestrated by the Cosco brothers with the approval of 'Ndrangheta boss Salvatore Ceraudo. Furthermore, she alleged that her brother-in-law, Giuseppe Cosco, known as Totonno U lupu, was responsible for Floriano's murder, which occurred in the courtyard of Lea's home. Garofalo also implicated Carlo Cosco in her brother's murder, suggesting a potential motive for the crime.

Following her decision to collaborate, Lea Garofalo and her daughter Denise were admitted to the Italian Witness Protection Program (Italian: Servizio centrale di protezione dei collaboratori di giustizia) in 2002 and relocated to Campobasso. However, in 2006, their protection was revoked, reportedly due to doubts about the significance of her testimony and her reliability as a witness. Garofalo challenged this revocation through administrative appeals, but both the Tribunale Amministrativo Regionale and initially the Council of State upheld the decision. Eventually, the Council of State granted her readmission to the protection program as a justice collaborator, though not as a judicial witness. In April 2009, Garofalo abruptly ended her engagement with the protection program, choosing to re-establish contacts in Petilia Policastro while remaining in Campobasso to allow Denise to complete the school year.

== Attempted Kidnapping ==
Carlo Cosco, who divided his time between Milan and Petilia Policastro, assisted Lea in finding a new residence in Campobasso. On 5 May 2009, Massimo Sabatino gained entry to Lea's home under false pretenses with the intention to kidnap and murder her. Denise's unexpected presence at home that day allowed Lea to escape the ambush and report the incident to the Carabinieri.

The investigation into this attempted kidnapping gained momentum after Garofalo's subsequent murder. On 4 February 2010, Carlo Cosco was placed under investigation, along with Massimo Sabatino, who was already imprisoned in Milan since December 2009 on drug trafficking charges. Prior to her death, on 28 April 2009, Lea Garofalo wrote to the President of Italy Giorgio Napolitano, expressing her grievances. She stated that despite being officially recognized as a justice collaborator, she received inadequate legal support, had lost her job and social network, and had been forced to sell her home due to legal expenses.

== Murder and Body Disposal ==
On 20 November 2009, Carlo Cosco lured Lea Garofalo to Milan, ostensibly to discuss Denise's future. By this time, Lea had been out of the formal justice protection program for several months. On the evening of 24 November, Cosco took Lea to an apartment when Denise was not present. Vito Cosco, nicknamed "Sergio," was waiting in the hallway. Lea was murdered, and her body was then handed over to Carmine Venturino, Rosario Curcio, and Massimo Sabatino for disposal.

Her body was transported to San Fruttuoso in Monza, where it was burned over a period of three days in an attempt to completely destroy it. Carmine Venturino, after his initial conviction, began to cooperate with authorities, providing details that led to the discovery of Lea's bones and over 2,000 other fragments at the San Fruttuoso site.

== Legal Proceedings and Convictions ==
The investigations into Lea Garofalo's murder were conducted by the Direzione Distrettuale Antimafia of Milan and the Homicide Unit of the Arma dei Carabinieri in Milan. In October 2010, Italian magistrates issued detention warrants for Carlo Cosco, Massimo Sabatino, Giuseppe Cosco «Smith», Vito Cosco «Sergio», Carmine Venturino, and Rosario Curcio. On 24 February 2010, two individuals from Cormano were also arrested for selling the land in San Fruttuoso where Lea's remains were discovered.

Denise Garofalo became a crucial witness in the legal proceedings, choosing to testify against her father. Initially, the trial faced a setback when Paola Severino appointed the court president Filippo Grisolla as the Cabinet Chief of the Italian Minister of Justice and Grace on 23 November 2011. This appointment led to the annulment of the initial proceedings due to legal incompatibility, and the trial had to be restarted.

On 30 March 2012, six defendants were convicted of kidnapping, murder, and destruction of a corpse, although the Mafia association aggravating circumstance was not recognized in the first instance. Carlo Cosco and his brother Vito received life sentences with two years of isolation, while Giuseppe Cosco, Rosario Curcio, Massimo Sabatino, and Carmine Venturino (Denise Cosco's former boyfriend) also received life sentences and a year of solitary confinement.

Following Venturino's cooperation, Lea's remains were discovered in San Fruttuoso during an archaeological excavation involving the Institute of Legal Medicine of Milan. On 28 May 2013, the Assizes Court of Milan upheld four of the six life sentences from the first trial. Life imprisonment was confirmed for Carlo and Vito Cosco, Rosario Curcio, and Massimo Sabatino. Carmine Venturino's sentence was reduced to 25 years, while Giuseppe Cosco was acquitted. The court also ordered financial compensation to be paid to the civil parties in the case: Lea Garofalo's mother, her daughter Denise, her sister Marisa, and the Municipality of Milan.

On 18 December 2014, the Italian Supreme Court of Cassation definitively confirmed all convictions issued by the Corte di Assise e di Appello of Milan.

== Awards and honors ==
- 14 March 2018: Lea Garofalo was posthumously awarded the Medaglia d'oro al merito civile (Gold Medal of Civil Merit) by the Italian President Sergio Mattarella. The citation read:

Con ammirevole determinazione, pur consapevole dei rischi cui si esponeva, si ribellava al contesto in cui era cresciuta, pervaso da criminalità e devianze educative e, dopo aver lasciato il compagno, esponente di una cosca calabrese, fuggiva dall’ambiente di origine per dare alla figlia opportunità diverse, decidendo, nel contempo, di collaborare con le Forze di polizia, rivelando notizie su omicidi ed estorsioni. Dopo alcuni anni, veniva rintracciata e rapita dall’ex convivente, con l’aiuto di altri complici, e, dopo uno spietato interrogatorio e terribili torture, veniva barbaramente uccisa, con occultamento del cadavere, mai più ritrovato. Splendido esempio di straordinario coraggio e altissimo senso civico, spinti fino all’estremo sacrificio. Novembre 2009 – Milano

With admirable determination, despite being aware of the risks she exposed herself to, she rebelled against the environment in which she had grown up, permeated by crime and educational deviance. After leaving her partner, a member of a Calabrian Mafia clan, she fled her original environment to give her daughter different opportunities, deciding, at the same time, to collaborate with the Police Forces, revealing information about homicides and extortions. After some years, she was tracked down and kidnapped by her ex-partner, with the help of other accomplices, and, after a ruthless interrogation and terrible torture, she was barbarously murdered, with concealment of the body, never found again. A wonderful example of extraordinary courage and the highest civic sense, taken to the ultimate sacrifice. November 2009, Milan.

— Italian President of Republic, Medaglia d'oro al merito civile

== Memorials and legacy ==
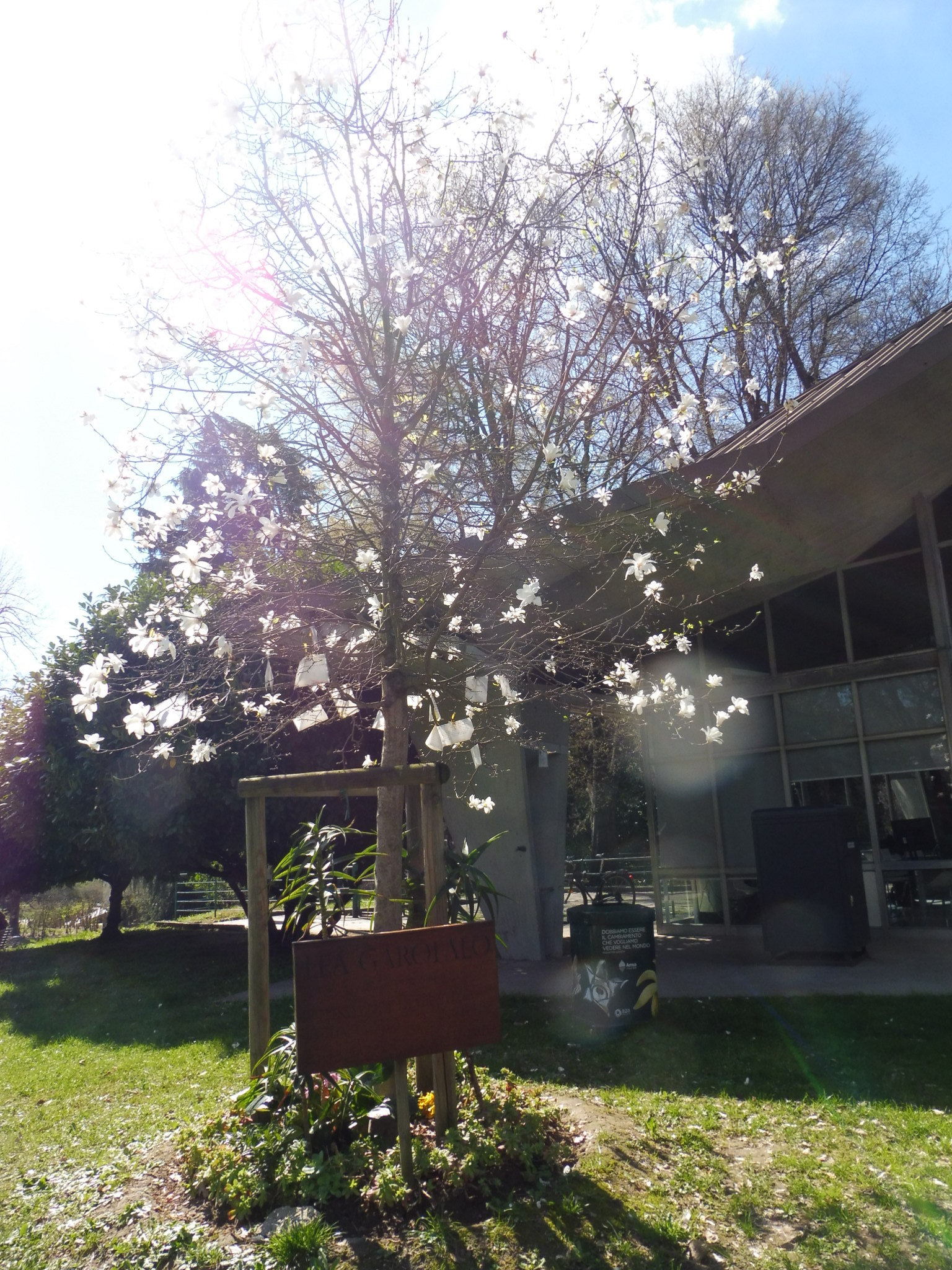
The tree dedicated to Lea Garofalo in the public library of Parco Sempione, in Milan

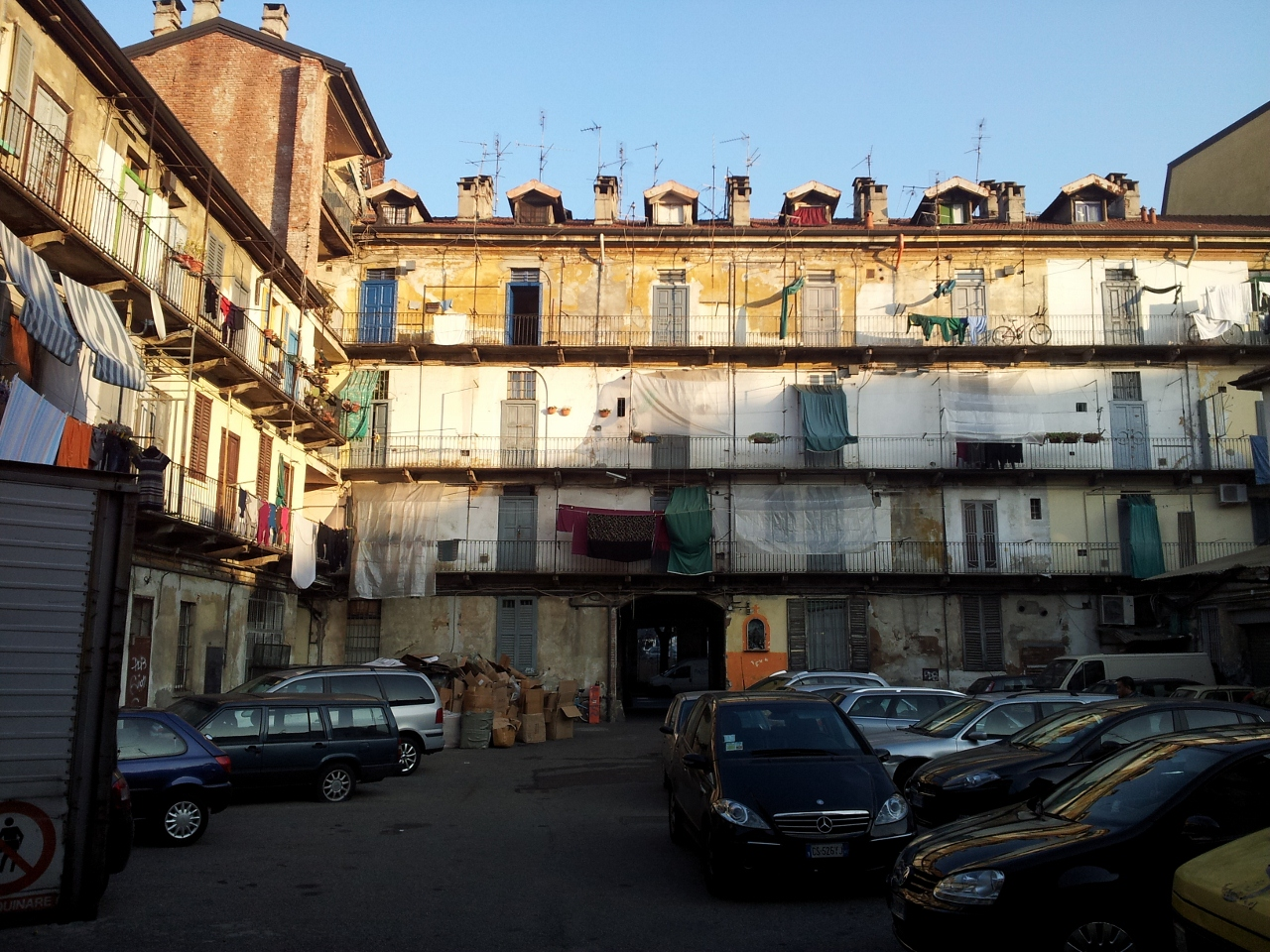
Lea Garofalo's home in Milan

- 21 March each year, the Libera network of anti-mafia associations commemorates Lea Garofalo's death.
- 1 April 2012: The comune of Monza, responding to a request from the website Daw-blog.com, installed a commemorative plaque in the San Fruttuoso cemetery, near the location where Garofalo was tortured and killed.
- December 2012: Il coraggio di dire no. Lea Garofalo, la donna che sfidò la 'ndrangheta (The Courage to Say No: Lea Garofalo, the Woman Who Defied the 'Ndrangheta'), the first biography dedicated to Lea Garofalo, was published.
- 19 October 2013: "Civil funerals" for Lea Garofalo were held in Piazza Beccaria in Milan, attended by Mayor Giuliano Pisapia and Don Luigi Ciotti. Concurrently, a public garden in Via Montello was dedicated in her memory. On the same day, winter magnolias were planted in the garden of the Biblioteca al Parco, near Parco Sempione.
- 7 September 2013: The municipality of Castelfranco Emilia named its public library in honor of Lea Garofalo.
- July 2014: The Parco del Coraggio (Courage Park), a public garden commemorating Lea Garofalo's courage, was inaugurated in Savignano sul Panaro. On 4 March 2015, following a visit by Don Luigi Ciotti, an oak tree was planted in the park.
- 18 November 2015: RAI1 broadcast the film Lea, a RAI production directed by Marco Tullio Giordana, starring Vanessa Scalera as Lea Garofalo.
- 2015: The mayor of Catanzaro, Sergio Abramo, dedicated the San Leonardo public gardens to Lea Garofalo.
- 9 January 2016: The Young Democrats circle of Crotone unveiled a commemorative plaque dedicated to Lea Garofalo, in the presence of her sister, Marisa Garofalo.
- 2016: Ilaria Ferramosca and Chiara Abastanotti released the graphic novel Lea Garofalo, una madre contro la 'ndrangheta (Lea Garofalo, a Mother Against the 'Ndrangheta), with contributions from Daniela Marcone (vice president of Libera) and Marika Demaria.
- 11 November 2016: Litfiba dedicated the song Maria Coraggio to Lea on their album Eutòpia. The music video was released on 10 March 2017, and the single was first broadcast on radio.
- 10 December 2016: Vimodrone inaugurated the "Lea Garofalo" municipal library, dedicating it to all victims of the mafia. On the same day, Luigi Ciotti was made an honorary citizen of Vimodrone.
- 2018: A bridge in the province of Lamezia Terme was named in honor of Lea Garofalo.
- 30 November 2019: The municipality of Rho renamed Parco Goglio as Parco Lea Garofalo.
- 2 June 2020: The graphic novel Lea Garofalo, una madre contro la 'ndrangheta was republished by the online journal il Fatto Quotidiano as part of the series Chiedi chi erano gli eroi (Ask Who the Heroes Were), featuring contributions from Marco Tullio Giordana and process documents.
- Peccia cites the murder of Garofalo, whom he describes as a “collaborator with justice”, in the context of a discussion of the image of “respectability” and “honour” that, according to the author, the ’Ndrangheta itself historically constructed, including around the principle of not targeting individuals regarded as “weak”, such as women and children. Peccia observes that the murders of Maria Strangio and Lea Garofalo call this alleged concept of “honour” into question.

== See also ==
- List of victims of the 'Ndrangheta
- 'Ndrangheta
- The Good Mothers

== Bibliography ==
- Paolo De Chiara (2012): Il coraggio di dire no - Lea Garofalo, la donna che sfidò la 'ndrangheta, Cosenza, Falco Editore with the preface of Enrico Fierro and introduction of Giulio Cavalli. ISBN 978-88-96895-93-1, OCLC 967942544
- Marika Demaria (2013):La scelta di Lea - Lea Garofalo, la ribellione di una donna alla 'ndrangheta, Milan, Melampo. with the preface of Nando Dalla Chiesa. ISBN 978-88-98231-04-1, OCLC 898706689.
