= Villa Torneamento =

Coordinates: 45°34′49″N 9°14′46″E

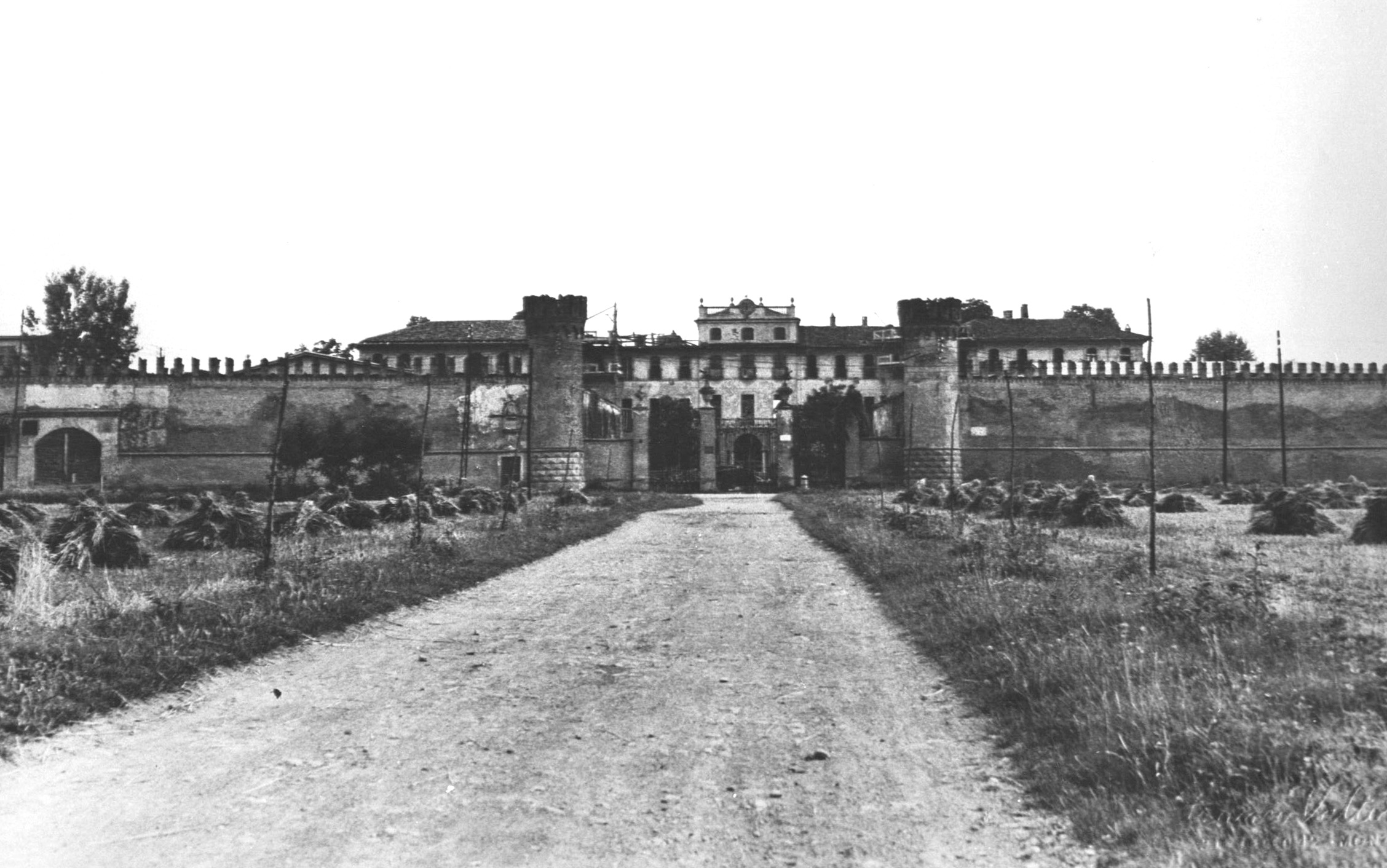
The Villa Torneamento in 1937

The Villa Torneamento is a historical building in Monza, northern Italy, in the Taccona Street, in the northern suburbs of the city, in the district of San Fruttuoso. It is 400 metres (1,300 ft) from the residential district of Triante. Known as The Castle by residents, it is used by the Daughters of Divine Zeal for a nursery school and primary school called Padre Annibale di Francia.

== History ==
Built in the 18th century by the Blondel family, it was later acquired by the Croce family, followed by the Bertoglio. In the 19th century new owners, the Brambilla, changed it into eclectic style using a design by architect Giuseppe Balzaretto, adding battlements and corner towers to the existing wall.

The architectural complex retains its original three-storey U-shaped wings with a height equal to that of the central body. The interior is characterized by a large staircase with two flights and two-story central hall, according to the architectural scheme typical of the 18th century, and decorated with historical scenes.

Today the villa is owned by a religious institution.
