= San Fruttuoso =

San Fruttuoso may refer to:

- San Fruttuoso (Monza), district of Monza, Italy
- San Fruttuoso (Genoa), quartiere of Genoa, Italy
- San Fruttuoso Abbey, a Romanesque religious building in Camogli, Italy
