= Annibale Maria di Francia =

Italian Roman Catholic saint

Saint Annibale Maria di Francia RCJ
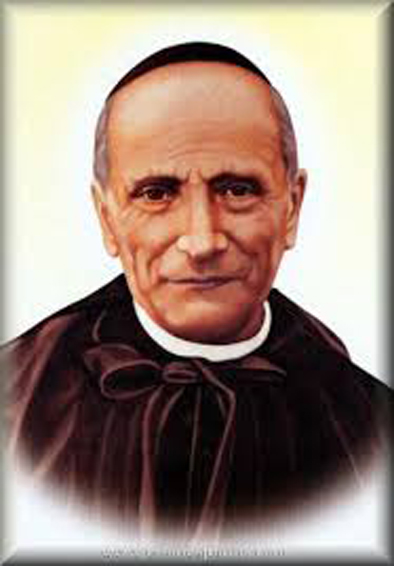
- Born: 5 July 1851; Messina, Italy
- Died: 1 June 1927 (aged 75); Messina, Italy
- Venerated in: Catholic Church
- Beatified: 7 October 1990, Saint Peter's Square, Vatican City by Pope John Paul II
- Canonized: 16 May 2004, Saint Peter's Square by Pope John Paul II
- Major shrine: Church of Saint Anthony of Padua, Messina, Sicily, Italy
- Feast: 1 June
- Attributes: Religious habit of the Rogationists

Annibale Maria di Francia, RCJ (or Hannibal Mary di Francia; 5 July 1851 – 1 June 1927) was an Italian Rogationist Father known for founding a series of orphanages, the Rogationists and the Daughters of Divine Zeal. He has been canonised and his feast day is 1 June.

== Early life ==
Francia was born on 5 July 1851 in Via Santa Maria delle Trombe, the Portalegni area of Messina. His father Francis was a knight of the Marquises of St. Catherine of Jonio, Papal Vice-Consul and Honorary Captain of the Navy. His mother, Anna Toscano, belonged to the noble family of the Marquises of Montanaro. His brother Francesco was declared Venerable in 2019. The third of four children, Francia lost his father when he was only fifteen months old. This experience would profoundly affect his life and made him deeply empathetic towards orphans. At the age of seven he enrolled in the College of St. Nicholas, run by the Cistercian Fathers. He was a devout child. Here under the guidance of his spiritual director, he was introduced to a devout life and he developed such love for the Eucharist that he was allowed to receive Holy Communion daily, something exceptional in those days.

== Education ==
Young Francia proved to be of high intelligence and had a poetic disposition. When he was fifteen years old he continued his studies under the tutelage of the famous Sicilian poet Felice Bisazza. He looked to a brilliant and secure career as a writer and poet but chose the religious life.

He was only seventeen, when as he was at prayer in front of the Blessed Sacrament, he was given the "revelation of Rogate", that is, he deeply felt that vocations in the church only come through prayer. Later on he found in the Gospel the very words of Jesus commanding such prayer: "Beg the harvest master to send out laborers to gather his harvest". (Mt 9:38; Lk 10:2). These words became the main source of inspiration for his life and the charism which led his apostolate.

On 11 July 1909 he wrote to Pope Pius X: "From my youth I have devoted myself to the words of the Gospel: Pray therefore the Lord of the Harvest ... In my charitable institutions, orphans, poor, priests and nuns, all pray incessantly to the loving Hearts of Jesus and Mary, to the Patriarch St. Joseph and to the Apostles, that they may provide the Holy Church with numerous and chosen laborers for the harvest of souls".

When, on 8 December 1869 he was given the clerical garb, he soon began putting his talents to work and became a well received preacher. People, especially the simple and those from the lower classes, loved to listen to him because of the clarity of his sermons.

Because of his intense ardor for Our Lady of Mount Carmel, he sought to enter the Discalced Carmelites. Upon discovering this, Archbishop Giuseppe Guarino discouraged him in his ideas, but encouraged him rather to stay in Avignone to continue working with the poor. For this reason, Francia entered the Carmelite Third Order.

== Priesthood ==
Once his theological studies were completed he was ordained a priest on 16 March 1878 in the church of the Spirito Santo. A few months before his ordination, when he was still a deacon, he met a poor blind beggar, Francesco Zancone, who providentially led him to discover a world unknown to him: Le Case Avignone ("The Avignone squatters"), in the outskirts of Messina. It was to be his new field of apostolate. He defined this as the "spirit of a twofold charity: the evangelization of and the care for the poor". Together with the intuition of the "Rogate", this spirit of charity would be the characteristic of his life.

=== Anthonian Orphanages ===
With the blessing of his Archbishop and the encouragement of John Bosco he began an evening school for boys, a day kindergarten for girls from five to eight years old. Then, the girl's orphanage got under way and, on 4 November 1883, the boys' orphanage. He placed them under the patronage of Saint Anthony of Padua. Later on all his charitable institutions for poor children will be called "Anthonian Orphanages". He was concerned that in his institutions the children were provided not only with food and prepared for a job, but more importantly that they would receive a solid moral and religious education. After their elementary-grade instruction, the girls were involved in sewing, knitting, and home economics in general. He used to say: "We should love children with tender and fatherly love. This is the secret of secrets to gain them to God".

Thirteen sisters were killed in the earthquake of 1908. Although the boys dormitory collapsed none of the orphans there or at the girls residence lost their lives. Additional orphanages were opened: including one in Bari for orphans of the 1910 cholera epidemic, and one in Altamura for orphans of the First World War.

The monthly periodical entitled God and Neighbor was first published in 1908. Having a modest format and a circulation that rose to more than half a million, it spread throughout the five continents. God and Neighbor, the organ of all the Anthonian orphanages lasted until 1942.

=== Rogationist Fathers ===
With the help of those who were his most reliable collaborators – Pantaleone Palma and Francis Vitale – Di Francia was able to lay the groundwork of his male congregation, The Rogationist Fathers of the Heart of Jesus. He perceived that the Rogate was the answer to his query. "What are these few orphans we attend to, these few people we bring the good news to, compared to the millions who are lost and abandoned as sheep without a shepherd? ... I looked for an answer and I found a complete one in the words of Jesus: 'Beg the harvest master to send out laborers to gather his harvest'. I concluded then that I had found the secret key to all good works and to the salvation of countless souls".

=== Daughters of Divine Zeal ===
Francia decided to found a new congregation of religious sisters whom he called Daughters of Divine Zeal, patterned after the inspiration of the Rogate – the expression of the zeal burning in the Sacred Heart of Jesus for the glory of the Father and the salvation of souls. The institute was given a one-year trial. During that year, he had as a cooperator for his work, Melanie Calvat. She remained at the institute for one year, from September 1897 to September 1898 – a year which, in the words of Francia, was a year of blessing. The trial period was weathered successfully, having a healthy and vigorous effect on the community, and the women's congregation was put on a safe footing.

He was noted for propagating the devotion of the "Servitude of Love" taught by Louis de Montfort and he embodied the spirit of complete abandonment into the hands of Mary. His charity knew no bounds, and it was directed toward all those in need, including priests facing difficulties and cloistered nuns who often are forgotten by benefactors. In Messina they used to say: "This is the house of Fr. Di Francia. Have a seat and you'll get something to eat." People regarded him as a Saint even when he was still alive. Angelo Paino, the Bishop of Messina, later gave this testimony about him: "He was considered a saint by all people. By this I mean people from all walks of life, social status and religious convictions".

== Death ==
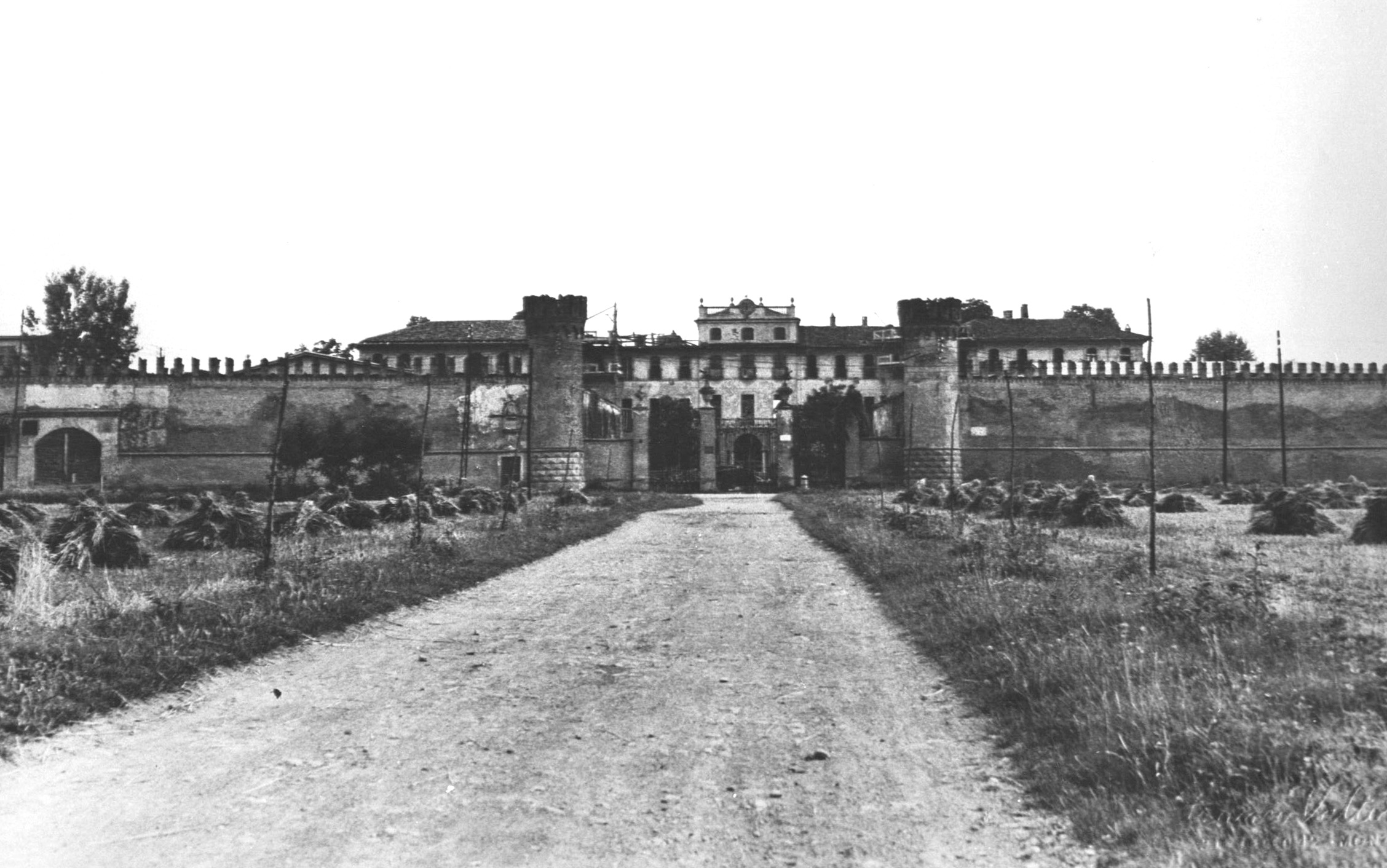
The Villa Torneamento in Monza, a still-existing school called Padre Annibale di Francia

On 1 June 1927 Saint Hannibal died in Messina. As soon as the people heard the news of his death they began to say: "Let us go to see the sleeping saint." A few days before the Blessed Virgin Mary was said to have appeared to him and assured him of her protection, a vision to reward his devotion toward her.

Newspapers of the entire region reported with pictures and articles of the funeral and burial. Crowds of thousands came to mourn his death. Local authorities quickly released the permit allowing that his body be buried in the Shrine of the Evangelical Rogation which Di Francia himself had built in Messina and wanted to be dedicated to the Gospel's command: "Pray therefore the Lord of the Harvest to send workers into his harvest."

== Beatification and canonisation ==
Many of his contemporaries, and among them Luigi Orione, requested that a formal cause for canonization be promptly started, but World War II put a temporary stop to the undertaking.

On 21 April 1945 the information stage of the process for Canonization began with the Diocesan investigations. All the writings of Di Francia (62 volumes) were examined by a committee of theologians. The process was opened on 14 November 1952, granting Di Francia the title of a Servant of God. In 1979 the Congress of Cardinals voted to begin the formal cause for beatification which began in Messina on 8 March 1980; at the same time the ecclesiastical tribunal set up a committee of historians.

On 21 December 1989 Pope John Paul II promulgated the Decree on the heroic virtue of the Servant of God. On 30 June 1990, the medical commission of the Congregation for the Causes of Saints agreed that the case of Gleida Danese, a Brazilian girl who was doomed to die because of the rupture of the aorta but who suddenly recovered, had no possible medical explanation. Both the commission of theologians and the Congress of Cardinals and Bishops in July 1990 agreed upon the miraculous recovery of the girl and found that it was to be attributed to the intercession of the Hannibal Di Francia. Di Francia was beatified on 7 October 1990 by Pope John Paul II. He was canonised on 16 May 2004 by Pope John Paul II.

At present time the religious families founded by Di Francia are present in the five continents of the world. In the spirit of their founder, they dedicate themselves to a variety of apostolates. They work in institutions for orphans and abandoned children, schools for the deaf and blind, homes for the aged and pregnant girls, educational institutions and vocational schools, missions and parishes, religious printing houses and vocation centers which promote the ideals of Rogate.

On 7 July 2010 Benedict XVI blessed a marble statue of St. Hannibal Mary di Francia. The statue is positioned in an external niche of the Vatican Basilica near the Arch of the Bells.
