= Francesco Maria di Francia =

Venerable Francesco Maria di Francia
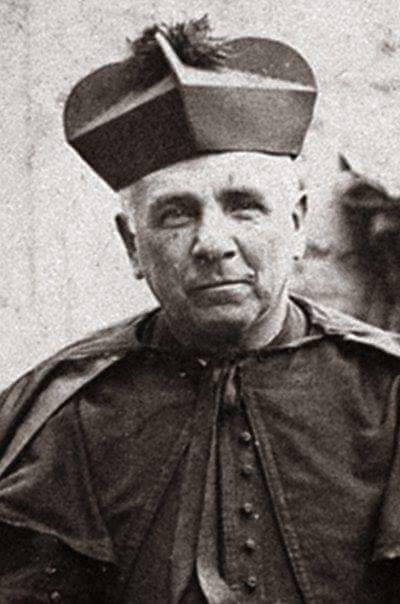
- Born: 19 February 1853; Messina, Kingdom of the Two Sicilies
- Died: 22 December 1913 (aged 60); Roccalumera, Messina, Kingdom of Italy
- Venerated in: Roman Catholic Church
- Attributes: Priest's cassock
- Patronage: Capuchin Sisters of the Sacred Heart

Francesco Maria di Francia (19 February 1853 - 22 December 1913) was an Italian Roman Catholic priest and the founder of the Capuchin Sisters of the Sacred Heart. He formed a close bond with his older brother (canonized in 2004) and the two studied together under a priest uncle. He tried music after experiencing doubts about his vocation but continued his studies leading to his ordination in Messina where he would spend his entire life ministering to people. He aided the ill during a cholera epidemic while in 1908 aiding in rescue and reconstruction efforts following a violent earthquake. Di Francia also taught moral theological studies to seminarians for a time before being given a role in archdiocesan curial affairs some months before his death from a heart attack.

The beatification process for the late priest opened in the mid-1980s (he became titled as a Servant of God) after his order lobbied for a cause to be opened in the Messina-Lipari-Santa Lucia del Mela archdiocese. The cause culminated on 19 March 2019 after Pope Francis acknowledged his life of heroic virtue and so titled him as Venerable.

== Life ==
Francesco Maria di Francia was born on 19 February 1853 in Messina as the last of four children to the nobleman Francesco di Francia (c. 1818-10.10.1852) and Anna Toscano (c. 1829-1888). His father died just four months before his birth. His parents married around 1846. His older brother Annibale was canonized in 2004. He was baptized on 27 February 1853 in the names of "Maria Francesco di Paola" in honor of Francis of Paola. His siblings (in order) were his brother Giovanni and his sister Maria Caterina and then his brother Annibale.

Both he and his older brother Annibale were first entrusted to an old aunt before being sent to the College of the Cistercian Fathers in Messina under the care of their paternal priest uncle Raffaele di Francia. It was he who oversaw his and his older brother Annibale's education due to his mother being unable to provide for all her children on her own. His brother was noted for being more like his father while he was noted for being more like his mother due to his affection and dedication. Their schooling under their uncle both instilled in them a desire to enter the priesthood but their mother opposed her two sons entering the priesthood (despite her own strong religious devotion) though relented at a later point. Di Francia loved music since his childhood as well as poems and in 1869 composed a short song in honor of Francesco di Paola (his patron saint).

Di Francia received the clerical garb (in secret from his mother since she was still opposed to his vocation at that stage) in the San Francesco church on 7 December 1869. But he soon experienced doubts about the strength of his vocation and so left his studies to discern his future. His passion for music saw him twice pursue paths down a musical career in Naples but these did not work out in the end. He returned to his studies after determining God's plan for him and on 19 March 1877 received the tonsure in 1877. He received his ordination to the priesthood on 18 December 1880 in the San Paolo church in Messina from the metropolitan archbishop Cardinal Giuseppe Guarino. His pastoral duties extended to all, though his brother's activities as a priest inspired him to focus on the poor in more depth than he had before. In the late summer of 1887 a cholera epidemic hit Messina and Guarino granted di Francia permission to tend to the ill sufferers of the disease in the most affected areas despite his mother's concerns that he would contract the disease himself (she died in 1888 after the epidemic ended). He also was motivated to help when he saw few doctors offering their support to the victims. He worked among the ill for the duration of the epidemic and following this in 1888 began tending to ill children in the civic hospital. For a time di Francia taught moral theological studies to seminarians in Messina. In 1896 he first met Natala Briguglio and she inspired him to found an order catering to female religious. In 1897 in Messina he founded a religious congregation called the Poor Sisters of the Sacred Heart which later became titled the Capuchin Sisters of the Sacred Heart; Briguglio became a professed religious as "Veronica di Gesù Bambino" and was the first to join this order.

He and his brother helped in the rescue and reconstruction efforts following the violent earthquake that struck Messina on 28 December 1908. On 28 February 1912 the archbishop Letterio D'Arrigo Ramondini appointed him as the archdiocesan vicar general in a move that meant he had curial responsibilities to manage and which saw him work closer to the archbishop. But he still managed to go around preaching and hearing confessions despite the increased workload.

Di Francia came to Messina via train during the morning on 22 December 1913 but felt unwell in the train station in what was a heart attack. He asked to go to Roccalumera despite his deteriorating condition and said: "I prepare for paradise". Di Francia died there at 9:00pm from a heart attack with the nuns of his order gathered at his bedside after he blessed them. His brother learnt about his death on 31 December from Florence and wrote a letter to the archbishop to extoll his brother's good works and to express his condolences to the archdiocese. His remains were exhumed and relocated on 24 May 1935 from his grave to the Santuario di Sant'Antonio di Padova in Roccalumera that Briguglio oversaw work on. His order received a decree of praise on 4 March 1943 and then papal approval from Pope Pius XII on 16 February 1957 and exists in countries such as Colombia and Slovakia. The end of 2008 saw the order have 224 religious in 29 houses.

== Beatification process ==
The beatification process launched on 8 July 1986 after the Congregation for the Causes of Saints provided the official "nihil obstat" (no objections to the cause) declaration and titled di Francia as a Servant of God. This decree also enabled for the cause's initial investigation to be launched on the archdiocesan level. This diocesan process for the investigation was opened in the Messina-Lipari-Santa Lucia del Mela archdiocese on 12 June 1989 and closed less than a decade later on 3 October 1996. The investigation saw 144 testimonies collected as well as documentation attesting to di Francia's reputation for holiness. Other processes were held in Albano and Turin as well as in Brescia and Trani for supporting evidence. The investigation moved to Rome where the C.C.S. issued a decree on 6 November 1998 validating the process and confirming that it abided to their rules for conducting diocesan investigations.

The postulation (the officials coordinating the cause) compiled and submitted the official Positio dossier to the C.C.S. officials for additional evaluation on 22 December 2014. Historians approved the cause on 29 September 2015 as did nine theologians on 19 June 2018 and the C.C.S. cardinal and bishop members later on 5 March 2019. Di Francia became titled as Venerable on 19 March 2019 after Pope Francis signed a decree acknowledging the fact that Di Francia had practiced heroic virtue throughout his life.

The current postulator for the cause is Carlo Calloni.
