= Giuseppe Guarino =

Giuseppe Guarino may refer to:

- Giuseppe Guarino (film director) (1885–1963), Italian film director
- Giuseppe Guarino (cardinal) (1827–1897), Italian cardinal of the Roman Catholic Church
- Giuseppe Guarino (politician) (1922–2020), Italian politician
