= Petilia Policastro =

Petilia Policastro Greek: Policástro
- Comune
- Comune di Petilia Policastro
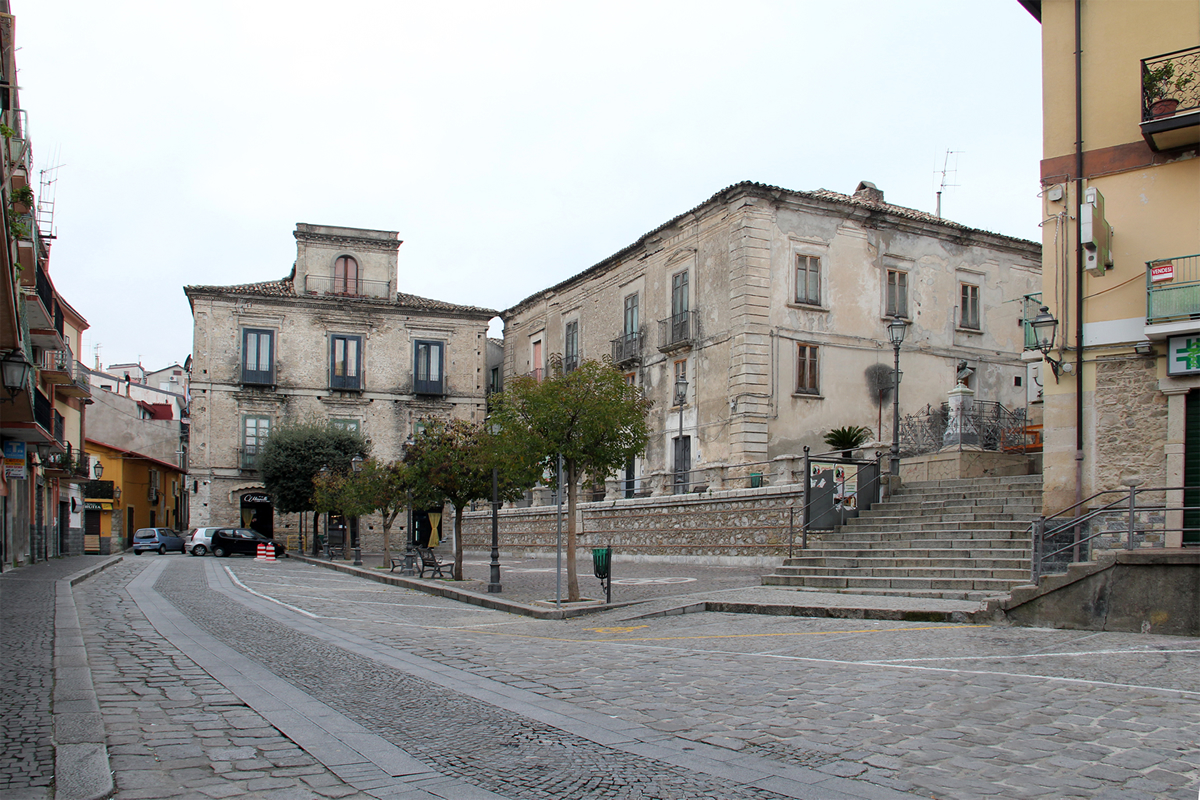

- Location within Italy Location within Calabria
- Coordinates: 39°06′50″N 16°47′15″E
- Country: Italy
- Region: Calabria
- Province: Crotone (KR)
- Frazioni: Foresta

Government
  - Mayor: Amedeo Nicolazzi

Area
  - Total: 98.35 km^{2} (37.97 sq mi)
- Elevation: 436 m (1,430 ft)

Population (2018-01-01)
  - Total: 9,073
  - Density: 92.25/km^{2} (238.9/sq mi)
- Demonym: Petilini
- Time zone: UTC+1 (CET)
  - Summer (DST): UTC+2 (CEST)
- Postal code: 88837
- Patron saint: Saint Sebastian
- Website: Official website

Petilia Policastro is a comune and town in the province of Crotone, in Calabria, Italy.

== History ==
Recent archaeology has discovered of a major complex dating to the Old and Middle Bronze Age (early 2nd millennium BC). This complex in the context of the Capo Piccolo facies has close cultural and economic ties with the Capo Graziano, Sicilian Rodì and Salentian Apulian facies. Two bronze axes with raised edges were found in the area in 1987 and currently on display at the National Archaeological Museum in Crotone, date to the same facies and, along with a dagger (now missing), were part of the funerary decoration of a high-ranking person. One of the axes, finely decorated with geometric drawings made with a burin, has been declared unique in Europe.

According to Greek mythology, the city of Petelia was founded by Philoctetes, the archer famous for having killed Paris in the Trojan War.

In its territory, along the Tacina and Soleo rivers, remains of settlements of Bruttian origin have been found, dating to the 4th and 2nd centuries BC, and Roman vestiges. Recently, archaeology in the Foresta locality has revealed the remains of a small rural building from the end of the Hellenistic period (3rd century BC).

Along the Cropa river are caves of karstic origin that have been used in the past by shepherds during transhumance.

The village, of presumed Byzantine origin, was surrounded in the past by defensive walls. Monastic remains dating to the Byzantine period have been found in some caves near the town, including a Byzantine cross carved into the wall. Below the town, there are very extensive karstic caves that reach a depth of 100 meters. They are surrounded by underground lakes and rivers and clay pots dating back to Byzantine times were found in them.

The town today maintains the old, poorly maintained center of Byzantine origin. There are remains of later centuries, such as the palaces of the 17th and 18th centuries, since the Spanish monarchs in the 17th century sent the noble family of the Portiglia to have complete control of the surrounding territory. Among the ancient palaces, those of the Portiglia, the Aquila family (17th century), and those of the Filomarino and Ferrari families from the 18th century stand out. Also, the churches are very old: Santa Maria Maggiore was built in the 15th century, San Nicola Pontefice and the Annunziata in the 17th century.

In the historic centre, in front of the current façade of the Church of San Nicola Pontefice, a cemetery with rock-cut tombs, some with multiple burials, dating to the 17th century, was revealed. Other important remains, including ceramics and coins, have been found in the same excavation.

On the mountains near the town, there are the convent and the church of the Santa Spina. The church, in Baroque style, dates to 1600 and houses a thorn from the crown of Jesus Christ, donated in 1498 by Joan of Valois, Queen of France, (wife of Louis XII), to her personal confessor, Father Dionisio Sacco, bishop of Reims. The latter decided to take it to his monastery of origin, the Franciscan monastery of Petilia Policastro.

The town was home to Pope Anterus during the 3rd century.

It is the home town of Lea Garofalo, a renowned antimafia woman who was murdered by Carlo Cosco for trying to escape her N'drangheta family and cooperating with the italian authorities.

== Economy ==
The town relies on the production of olive oil, wine, cereals, citruses, the processing of timber from the local La Sila mountains, and the breeding of cattle.
