= Sacro Cuore, Monza =

Church in Monza, Italy

Coordinates: 45°35′N 9°16′E

Sacro Cuore Sacred Heart
- Chiesa del Sacro Cuore (in Italian)
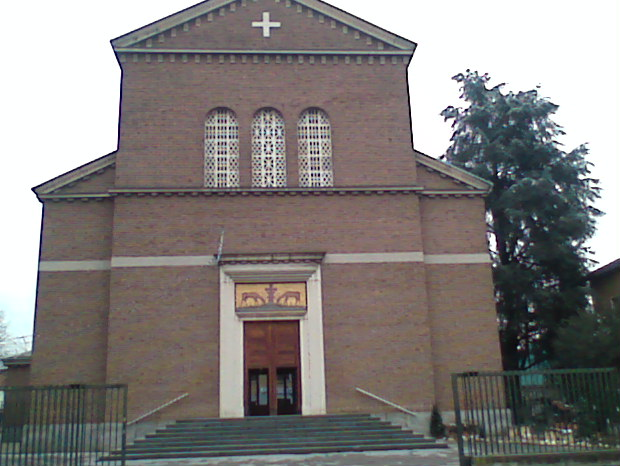
- Façade of the Sacred Heart

Religion
- Affiliation: Catholic
- Province: Archdiocese of Milan
- Rite: Latin Rite

Location
- Location: Monza, Italy
- Interactive map of Sacro Cuore; Sacred Heart

Architecture
- Style: Italian Neoclassical
- Completed: 1935
- Direction of façade: West

Sacro Cuore ("Sacred Heart") is a church in the Italian city of Monza, in the neighborhood of Triante, dedicated to the Sacred Heart of Jesus.

Chiesa Sacro Crore is located in the secular Province of Monza and Brianza, and the ecclesiastical Archdiocese of Milan.

== History ==
The church was built in neoclassical style. The building lies on Via Vittorio Veneto, one of the main roads in the district. In the 1930s as the suburb of Monza grew, so did the need for a church for the local population, until then served by the small church in the nearby district of San Biago. With help from the parish of San Biagio, the site was purchased.

The church was built starting in 1933, and consecrated in 1935. In 1964, the church was added to the Catalogo generale dei Beni Culturali, a listing of Italian landmarks.

The church hosts concerts of religious music.

The parish of the church also manages the Don Bosco oratory, a chapel located on the Via Duca D'Aosta, behind the church.
