= List of victims of the 'Ndrangheta =

This list of victims of the 'Ndrangheta includes people who have been killed by the Calabrian 'Ndrangheta while opposing its rule. It does not include people killed in internal conflicts of the 'Ndrangheta itself.

== 1970s ==
=== 1977 ===
- July 15 – Donald Mackay, disappeared, presumed dead, an Australian anti-drugs campaigner who denounced marijuana growing by 'Ndrangheta groups around Griffith, New South Wales.

=== 1975 ===
- July 3 – Francesco Ferlaino, an Italian magistrate.

== 1980s ==
=== 1980 ===
- June 11 - Giuseppe Valarioti, the secretary of the Italian Communist Party (PCI) in Rosarno.

=== 1982 ===
- May 3 – Gennaro Musella, a marine engineer killed by a car bomb in Reggio Calabria after interfering in a public contract for the construction of the port of Bagnara Calabra, that had already been claimed by 'Ndrangheta boss Paolo De Stefano, and Catania Mafia boss Nitto Santapaola.

=== 1983 ===
- June 26 – Judge Bruno Caccia, investigating extortion by the 'Ndrangheta in Turin.

=== 1985 ===
- February 6 – Carmine Tripodi, head of the Carabinieri station in San Luca.

=== 1989 ===
- March 20 – Vincenzo Grasso, an Italian businessman who refused to pay extortion money in Locri.
- August 27 – Lodovico Ligato, an Italian Christian Democrat politician from Reggio Calabria and the former head of the Italian State Railways. Ligato demanded a 10 percent bribe on public work contracts, jeopardizing agreements already reached among a so-called "business committee" of local politicians and 'Ndrangheta groups.

== 1990s ==
=== 1991 ===
- August 9 – Judge Antonino Scopelliti, murdered by the 'Ndrangheta on behalf of the Sicilian Mafia while reviewing the final sentence of the Maxi Trial against Cosa Nostra for the Supreme Court (Corte di Cassazione).

=== 1992 ===
- April 7 - Stefano Ceratti, a cardiologist and politician, murdered because as town councilor he exposed irregularities in public procurement in Bianco (Calabria).

=== 1994 ===
- March 16 – Angela Costantino, disappeared, murdered by the Lo Giudice 'Ndrangheta clan from Reggio Calabria because she betrayed her husband while he was detained.

== 2000s ==
=== 2005 ===
- October 16 – Francesco Fortugno, an Italian politician and the Vice President of the Regional Assembly of Calabria. Fortugno was investigating the awarding of hospital contracts in the Calabrian healthcare system to prevent the penetration of the 'Ndrangheta in the health care system.
- May 24 – Gianluca Congiusta, an Italian businessman murdered in Siderno for refusing to pay extortion money.

=== 2009 ===
- November 24 – Lea Garofalo, the former wife of a member of the 'Ndrangheta who became a police informant (pentito) that was killed and whose corpse was burnt for 3 days to make it disappear (though initially believed to have been dissolved in acid).
