= Bonincontro Morigia =

Italian writer

Lord Bonincontro Morigia
- Patrician of Monza
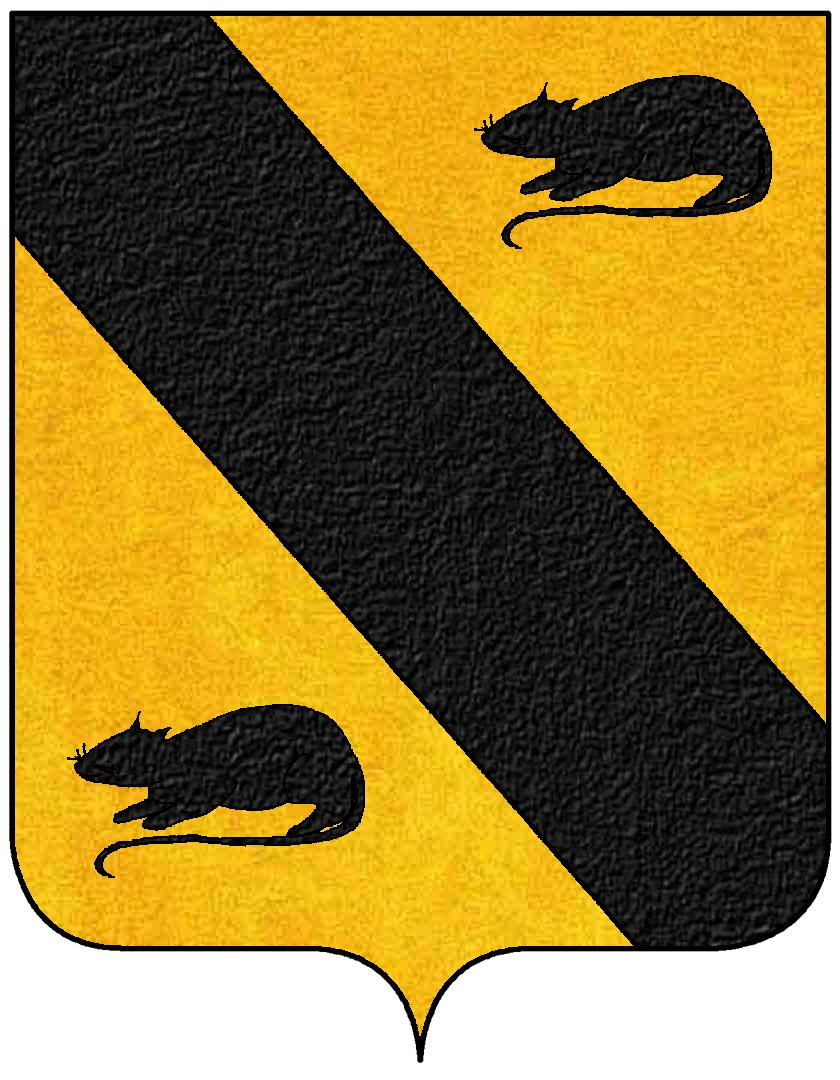
- Predecessor: Lord Martino Morigia
- Born: 14th century
- Died: 14th century Monza
- Noble family: Moriggia
- Father: Lord Martino Morigia

Bonincontro Morigia (fl. 14th century) was a historical writer from Monza in northern Italy.

== Life ==
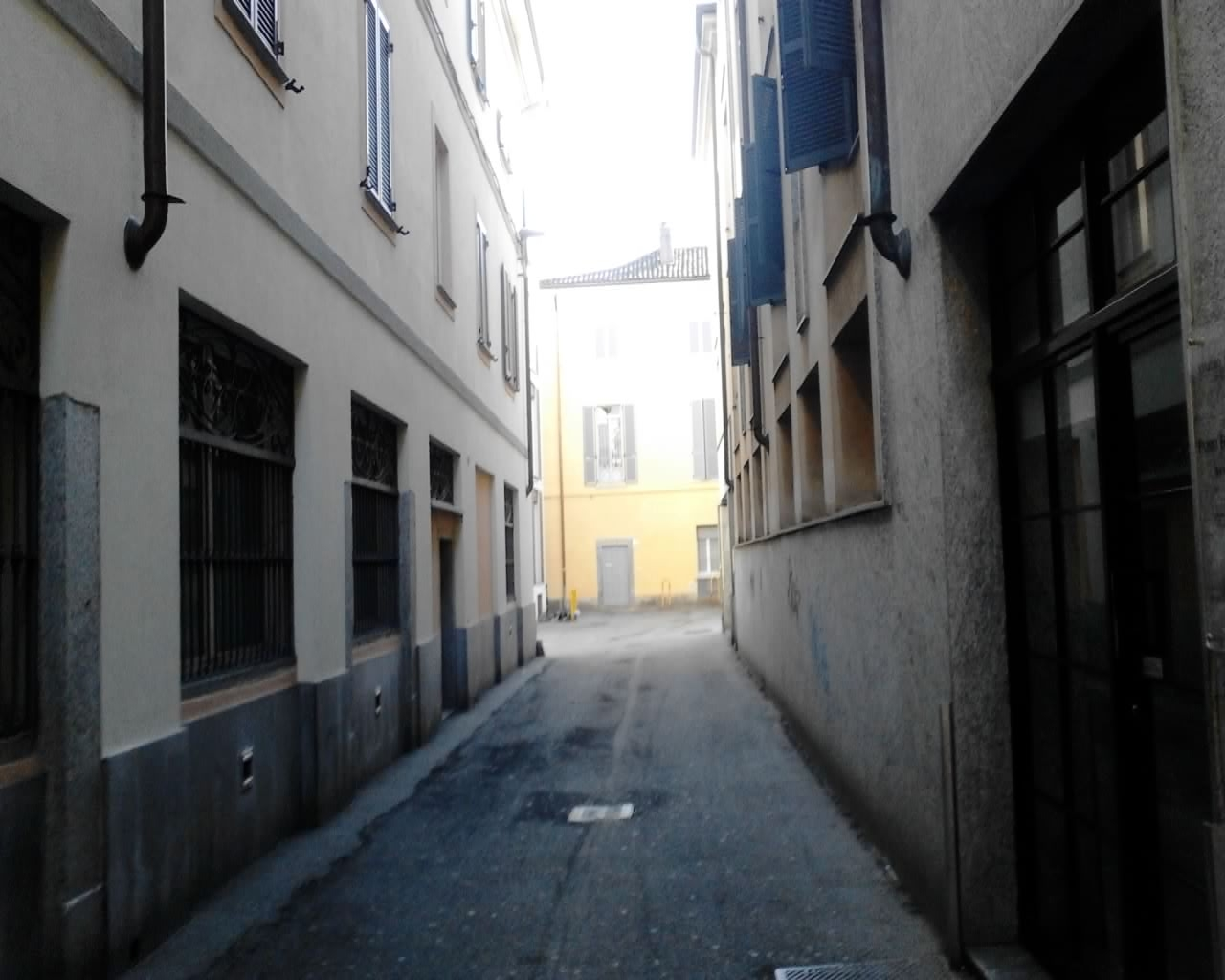
The street dedicated to Morigia in the historical center of Monza

Born in Monza around 1295, he was a member of an important Ghibelline family of that city. He took an active part in the political struggles of his time, siding with the party of the Visconti, lords of Milan. He was also a member of the Council of the Twelve which administered the city, and on one occasion was ambassador to Venice.

He is however noted as an historian.

== Main works ==
The main work of Morigia is the Chronicon Modoetiense, a history of Monza from its origins to his own day.

Morigia is the first author known to report the legend that the Latin name of Monza ("Modoetia") derives from a vision in a dream by Queen Theodelinda: a dove (symbol of the Holy Spirit) is said to have told her to found her capital on the site, bearing in it a scroll inscribed with the word "Modo" ("Now"), to which she responded "Etiam" ("Yes"). This legend inspired some of the frescoes in Monza Cathedral by the Zavattari brothers.

He was also the first biographer of Saint Gerardo dei Tintori, hospitaller and patron saint of Monza together with Saint John the Baptist. The life of Gerardo is included in the Chronicon Modoetiense, where Morigia also lists a number of miracles attributed to the saint, of one of which Morigia claims to have been an eyewitness.
