= The Good Mothers =

British-Italian crime drama television series

- Teaser poster
- Genre: Crime drama
- Based on: The Good Mothers by Alex Perry
- Written by: Stephen Butchard
- Directed by: Julian Jarrold; Elisa Amoruso
- Starring: Gaia Girace; Valentina Bellè; Barbara Chichiarelli; Simona Di Stefano; Micaela Ramazzotti
- Music by: Giorgio Giampà
- Countries of origin: United Kingdom; Italy
- Original language: Italian
- No. of episodes: 6

Production
- Executive producer: Stephen Butchard
- Producers: Juliette Howell; Tessa Ross; Harriet Spencer; Mario Gianani; Lorenzo Gangarossa
- Cinematography: Vittorio Omodei Zorini; Martina Cocco; Ferran Paredes Rubio
- Editors: Simona Paggi; Chiara Griziotti; Irene Vecchio
- Running time: 45 minutes
- Production companies: House Productions; Wildside

Original release
- Network: Disney+
- Release: 21 February 2023

The Good Mothers is a 2023 British-Italian crime drama television mini-series directed by Julian Jarrold and Elisa Amoruso. Based on a true story and adapted from the eponymous novel by Alex Perry, the series depicts how three women inside the 'Ndrangheta, a mafia-type organisation in Calabria, worked with a female prosecutor to fight the criminal network.

The Good Mothers had its international premiere at 73rd Berlin International Film Festival in Berlinale Series on 21 February 2023, as first 2 episodes out of 6 were screened. It was released on April 5, 2023 internationally on Disney+ and on Hulu in the United States.

== Synopsis ==
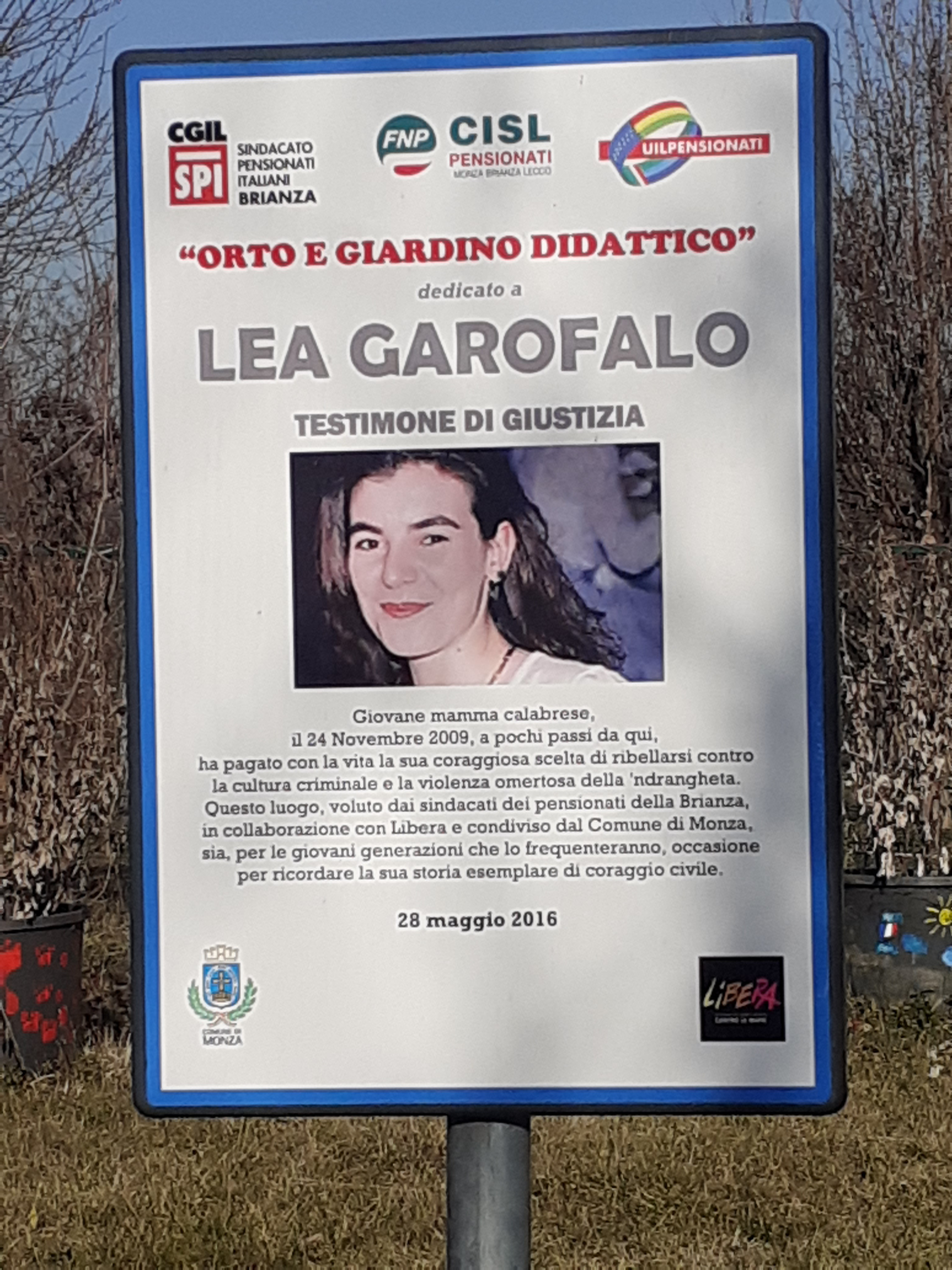
Lea Garofalo tribute poster in the Orto e Giardino Didattico dedicated to her in Monza

Set in 2010, the series begins with the disappearance of Lea Garofalo, who, together with her daughter Denise, had decided to end the 'Ndrangheta mafia. In Calabria, Anna Colace, a public prosecutor committed against the criminal clans, develops a new strategy to crush the power of the gangs by influencing the female members to collaborate and thus undermine the organization's power structure. A strategy that puts women in front, and betray their families, in the hope of better future for themselves and their children.

== Cast ==
- Gaia Girace as Denise Cosco
- Valentina Bellè as Giuseppina Pesce
- Barbara Chichiarelli as Anna Colace
- Francesco Colella as Carlo Cosco
- Simona Distefano as Concetta Cacciola
- Andrea Dodero as Carmine
- Micaela Ramazzotti as Lea Garofalo
- Andrea Riso as Enrico

== Episodes ==
No. in season	Title	Duration	Original release date
1	"Mouth of the Wolf" "Nella bocca del lupo"	57 min	5 April 2023
2	"Family and Loyalty" "Famiglia e lealtà"	60 min	5 April 2023
3	"Another Life" "Un'altra vita"	61 min	5 April 2023
4	"Betrayal" "Tradimento"	57 min	5 April 2023
5	"Mothers and Daughters" "Madri e figli"	61 min	5 April 2023
6	"Courage" "Coraggio"	61 min	5 April 2023

== Production ==
On 15 April 2021, Disney+ confirmed the production of its Star Original series The Good Mothers. This series was part of Disney+ and Star's first European originals productions.

== Release ==
The first 2 episodes of the series were screened at 73rd Berlin International Film Festival in Berlinale Series on 21 February 2023. It began streaming on 5 April 2023 internationally on Disney+ and on Hulu in the United States.

== Reception ==
=== Critical response ===
The review aggregator website Rotten Tomatoes reported a 100% approval rating with an average rating of 8.00/10, based on 7 critic reviews.

Joel Keller of Decider asserted, "The first episode of The Good Mothers sets up a powerful story of an unheard faction of the ‘Ndrangheta families that stood up and helped to bring them down." Jasper Rees of The Telegraph gave the series a grade of 5 out of 5 stars, called it a "superb adaptation" of Alex Perry's book, and said that each episode is "compelling." Nick Clark of Evening Standard gave The Good Mothers a grade of 4 out of 5 stars, writing, "A gritty, Italian-language mafia drama may not have been an obvious gap in his CV, but this is expertly handled. Its beautifully shot, and thrillingly tense. Search it out, mamma mia this is good."

=== Accolades ===
Year	Award	Category	Nominee	Result	Ref.
2023	73rd Berlin International Film Festival	Berlinale Series	The Good Mothers	Won	
2023	Nastri D'Argento Grandi Serie	Best Series	The Good Mothers	Nominated	
2023	Nastri D'Argento Grandi Serie	Best Actress	Barbara Chichiarelli	Nominated	
2023	Nastri D'Argento Grandi Serie	Best Actor	Francesco Colella	Nominated	
2023	Nastri D'Argento Grandi Serie	Best Supporting Actress	Valentina Bellè	Won	
2024	29th Critics' Choice Awards	Best Foreign Language Series	The Good Mothers	Nominated	
