= Giuseppe Benedetto Dusmet =

Italian Roman Catholic cardinal (1818–1894)

His Eminence Blessed Giuseppe Benedetto Dusmet O.S.B.
- Archbishop of Catania
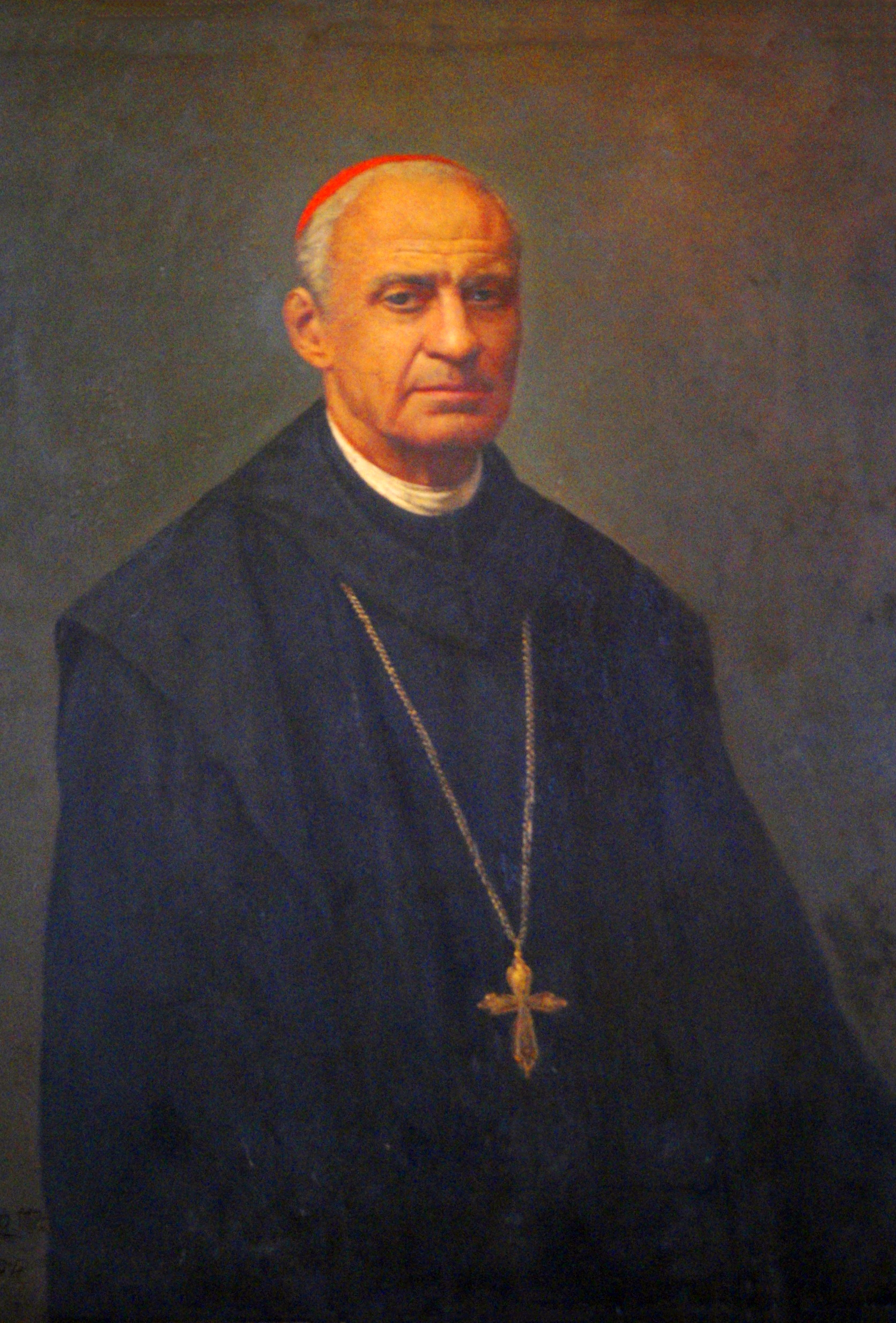
- Painting.
- Church: Roman Catholic Church
- Archdiocese: Catania
- See: Catania
- Appointed: 22 February 1867
- Installed: 1878
- Term ended: 4 April 1894
- Predecessor: Felice Regnano
- Successor: Giuseppe Francica-Nava de Bontifè
- Other post: Cardinal-Priest of Santa Pudenziana (1889–1894)

Orders
- Ordination: 18 September 1841
- Consecration: 10 March 1867 by Antonio Saverio De Luca
- Created cardinal: 11 February 1889 by Pope Leo XIII
- Rank: Cardinal-Priest

Personal details
- Born: Giuseppe Dusmet; 15 August 1818 Palermo, Sicily, Kingdom of the Two Sicilies
- Died: 4 April 1894 (aged 75) Catania, Sicily, Kingdom of Italy
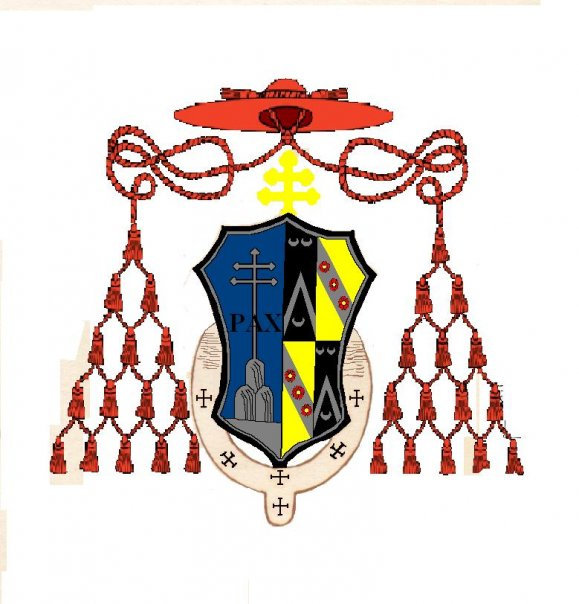
- Coat of arms: Giuseppe Benedetto Dusmet's coat of arms

Sainthood
- Feast day: 4 April; 25 September (Catania)
- Venerated in: Roman Catholic Church
- Beatified: 25 September 1988; Saint Peter's Square, Vatican City by Pope John Paul II
- Canonized: 25 March 1989
- Attributes: Cardinal's attire; Benedictine habit; Cross
- Patronage: Archdiocese of Catania

Ordination history of Giuseppe Benedetto Dusmet
History
Diaconal ordination
- Ordained by: Domenico Balsamo
Episcopal consecration
- Principal consecrator: Antonio Saverio De Luca
- Co-consecrators: Pietro Giannelli & Giuseppe Maria Papardo del Parco
Cardinalate
- Elevated by: Pope Leo XIII
Episcopal succession
Bishops consecrated by Giuseppe Benedetto Dusmet as principal consecrator
- Giovanni Blandini: 15 August 1875
- Antonio Caff: 15 August 1882

Giuseppe Benedetto Dusmet (15 August 1818 – 4 April 1894) – born Giuseppe Dusmet – was an Italian Roman Catholic cardinal who served as the Archbishop of Catania from 1867 until his death. He became professed into the Order of Saint Benedict where he took "Benedetto" as his religious name. He was given duties as a professor, then a prior, then abbot. His elevation to the episcopate saw him distinguish himself in cholera epidemics when he tended to the il. He was a strong advocate for the poor. He remained a monk in spirit and often wore the Benedictine habit instead of the red cardinal's regalia.

His beatification was celebrated on 25 September 1988.

Styles of Giuseppe Benedetto Dusmet
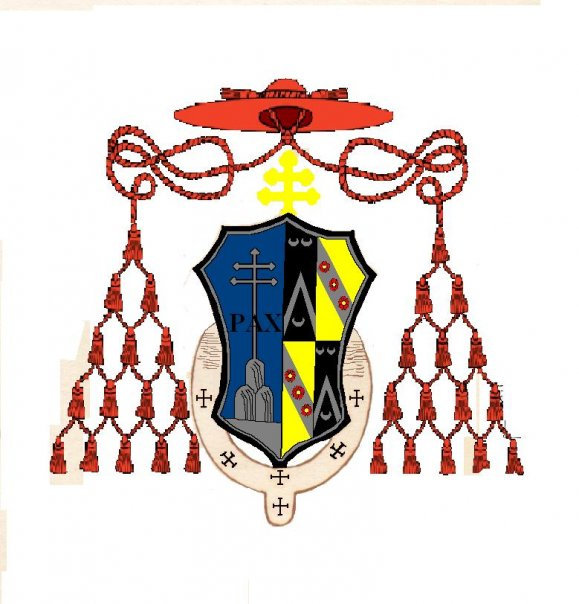
- Reference style: His Eminence
- Spoken style: Your Eminence
- Posthumous style: Blessed
- Informal style: Cardinal
- See: Catania

== Life ==
=== Education ===
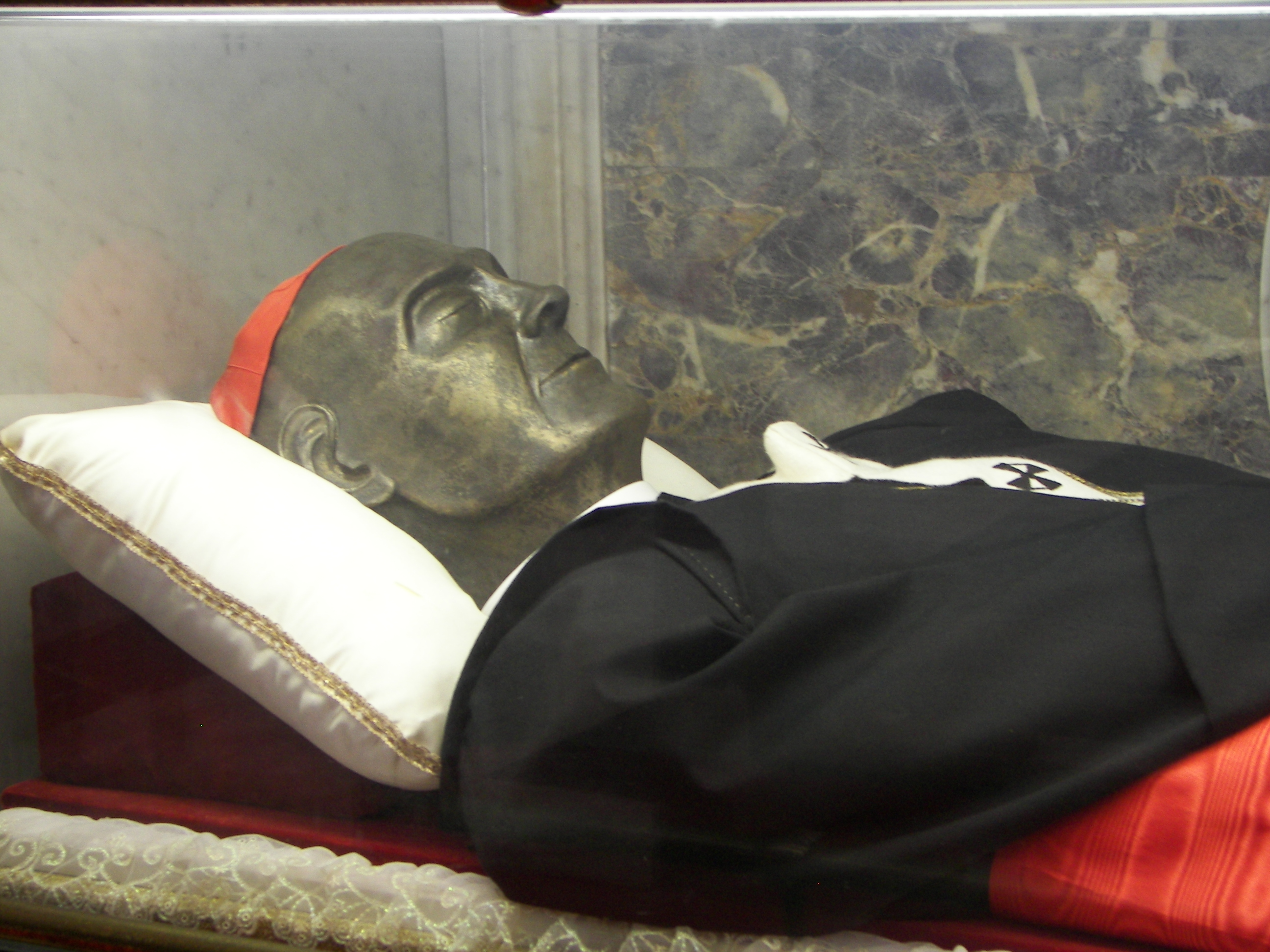
Iron mask covering the skull of the late cardinal.

Giuseppe Dusmet was born in Palermo in 1818 as the first of six children to the nobles Luigi Dusmet and Maria dei Dragonetti. His house could be traced back to Flanders in Belgium. Dusmet was baptized hours after his birth in the archdiocesan cathedral as "Giuseppe Maria Giacomo Filippo Lupo Domenico Antonio Rosolino Melchiorre Francesco di Paola Benedetto Gennaro". He would be referred to as Melchiorre at home. He had five siblings.

His two maternal uncles Vincenzo and Leopoldo Dragonetti were both Benedictine monks.

Dusmet was educated at the San Martino delle Scales convent in Monreale from 1824. It was around this time that the Dusmets moved to Naples and his father made him return there in 1832 since he feared exposure in the convent would awaken in his son a vocation to religious life. But Dusmet returned to the school in 1834 when his father realized that he could not change his son's mind.

He would later teach philosophical and theological studies at Benedictine houses. He entered the Benedictines at Montecassino and received the name "Benedetto" after professing his formal vows on 15 August 1840 before Abbot Eugenio Villaraut. In preparation for his profession he went on a retreat where the preacher was the future cardinal Michelangelo Celesia; the two became lifelong friends.

=== Priesthood ===
He received the subdiaconate from Archbishop Domenico Balsamo on 11 October 1840 in the archiepiscopal palace and would later receive the diaconate from the same prelate in the same location on 15 November 1840. He was ordained to the priesthood on 18 September 1841 and had to receive a special dispensation to be ordained since he was under the canonical age requirement.

In 1845 he began serving as an aide to the abbot Carlo Antonio Buglio and travelled with him as the latter made visitations to the Caltanissetta and Catania convents. The General Chapter in 1847 saw Buglio – and Dusmet accompanied him – moved to the San Flavio convent of Caltanissetta. Dusmet served as the prior for the Santi Severino e Sossio convent in Naples from 12 June 1850 until May 1852 (during the General Chapter at Montecassino) when he was named as the prior for the San Flavio convent in Caltanissetta. He held that position until 1858 when the General Chapter at Perugia named him as the abbot for the San Nicolò l'Arena convent. But he no longer could hold that position as of 15 October 1866 after the Italian kingdom was established with the state confiscating all religious properties.

=== Episcopate and cardinalate ===
He was appointed Archbishop of Catania in 1867 and he received his episcopal consecration on 10 March in the Basilica di San Paolo fuori le Mura in Rome from Antonio Saverio De Luca. Pietro Giannelli and Giuseppe Maria Papardo del Parco served as co-consecrators. Dusmet issued his first pastoral letter to the faithful on 14 March. He served as a Council Father at the First Vatican Council that Pope Pius IX had convoked. Dusmet could not assume formal possession of his episcopal see since the new political situation with the kingdom saw the government approve bishops prior to formal enthronement. The government did not grant Dusmet the "exequatur" until 1878.

In 1887, Dusmet received the papal mandate to help establish the international college for Benedictines in Rome, Sant'Anselmo.

Dusmet was elevated to the cardinalate in 1889 with Pope Leo XIII naming him as the Cardinal-Priest of Santa Pudenziana. He did not receive the red hat and title until a week after his elevation.

Dusmet was close friends with the fellow Sicilian cardinal Giuseppe Guarino and he knew also Giuseppina Faro. Dusmet was also awarded as a Grand Cross Knight of the Order of the Holy Sepulcher and was also awarded the Gold Medal for the Benefits of Public Health on 23 November 1889 in Rome due to his efforts in aiding the ill in cholera epidemics.

=== Death ===
Dusmet died on 4 April 1894 at around 10:30 pm and was buried in the chapel of the Confraternita dei Bianci at a funeral on 6 April that started at 10:00 am and ended with his burial at 4:30 pm. He had fallen ill at the beginning of 1894 and on 2 April left instructions not to be embalmed and to have a simple funeral. On 4 April attempts at artificial respiration were stopped when doctors said that Dusmet's death was imminent. His final words echoed that of Jesus Christ: "it is finished". His relics were later translated to the Catania Cathedral in May 1904. Cardinal Alfredo Ildefonso Schuster – future Blessed and a Benedictine himself – unveiled a monument dedicated to Dusmet in Catania in 1935.

== Beatification ==
The process for Dusmet's beatification opened in Catania in an informative phase of investigation that opened on 7 January 1931 and closed in 1937 prior theologians approving his spiritual writings on 5 February 1941. Two additional process were held with one in Turin in 1936 and another one in Montecassino from 1935 to 1937. The formal introduction to his cause came under Pope Pius XII on 14 December 1948 which titled Dusmet as a Servant of God. An apostolic process was later held in Catania from 1949 to 1951. The Congregation for Rites validated the two processes in Rome in a decree issued on 17 March 1954 and the cause passed three bodies for approval. The first was the antepreparatory congregation which assessed and approved the cause on 1 March 1960 with a second preparatory one meeting on 15 December 1964. The last general committee met and approved the cause not long after on 18 May 1965.

The confirmation of his life of heroic virtue on 15 July 1965 led to Pope Paul VI naming Dusmet as Venerable.

Dusmet's beatification then depended on the papal confirmation of a miracle attributed to his intercession. One such case was investigated in Catania and sent to officials in Rome for additional assessment after the diocesan phase concluded on 7 December 1987. The Congregation for the Causes of Saints approved the diocesan investigation and validated it on 5 March 1988 with medical experts approving (unanimous vote) the healing's miraculous nature on 1 June 1988. Theologians met (unanimous approval) on 1 July 1988 and the cardinal and bishop members of the C.C.S. also affirmed the healing as a miracle on 19 July 1988.

Papal confirmation to this miracle came from Pope John Paul II on 1 September 1988 who presided over Dusmet's beatification in Saint Peter's Square on 25 September 1988.

=== Beatification miracle ===
The miracle leading to his canonization was the cure of Salvatore Consoli (18.02.1886–16.11.1971) who fell from a staircase aged 51 and contracted high fevers and acute spinal pain. He was hospitalized two months later while a month after was found to have a serious condition in which there was partial destruction of the spine. Consoli's condition worsened but appeals were made to Dusmet for healing – the pain ceased and his fever disappeared with the spine restoring itself. Consoli died from stomach cancer decades after.
