= Triante =

- Frazione
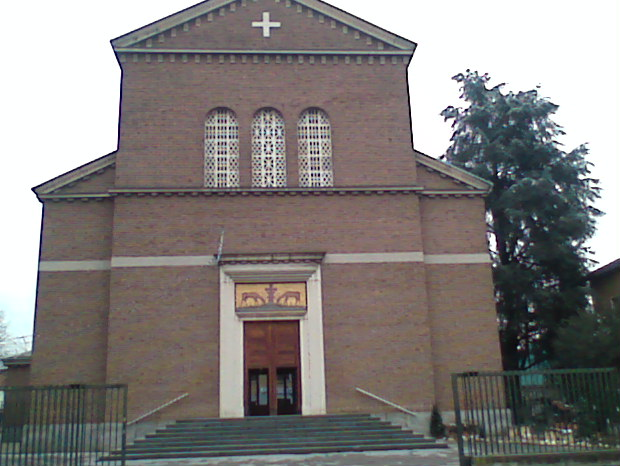
- The Church of Sacred Heart

- Location of Triante in Italy
- Coordinates: 45°35′N 9°16′E
- Country: Italy
- Region: Lombardy
- Province: Monza and Brianza (MB)
- Comune: Monza
- Elevation: 162 m (531 ft)
- Demonym: Monzesi
- Time zone: UTC+1 (CET)
  - Summer (DST): UTC+2 (CEST)
- Postal code: 20900
- Dialing code: +39 039
- Patron saint: St. John the Baptist, St. Gerardo dei Tintori
- Saint day: June 24
- Website: Official website

Triante is a district in the north-west of the town of Monza, Italy, and belongs administratively to the city's District 4. There are 33,863 residents in the district of people that are the 27.88% of the total population and their average age is 44 years while the proportion of people aged over 65 years 22.51%. District 4 is the most populous of all the districts of Monza, the adjacent district of San Biagio, San Giuseppe, and San Fruttuoso (Monza) and is crossed by Canale Villoresi.

The main streets of the district are: Via Felice Cavallotti (one of the main arteries linking the Old Town) Via Vittorio Veneto (the road connecting the Via Cavallotti and SS36) and Via Monte Cervino, famous for its many green spaces.

The name of the district derives from the Cascina Triante located at the center of the neighborhood, which was equipped with three entries (in dialect: Triant). Since then the post-war period, the Cascina was demolished and thence forward in its place stands a bank. The District of Triante is one of the most famous of the city, in addition to the geographical position in the area there are several residential buildings, banks and shops, a multiplex cinema and a parish, bicycle lanes, three public schools and many local nightclubs that of daytime.

== Degradation ==
The neighborhood in recent years has encountered numerous problems associated with the use of prostitution, this phenomenon has occurred in the district for its proximity to the Avenue Lombardia (known as SS36), affecting not only the area of the Avenue in question but also the streets adjacent to it: Duca d'Aosta, Andrea Doria, Vittorio Veneto and Carlo Emanuele I.

In the fall of 2008, the municipality of Monza adopted restrictive measures to combat this problem, installing cameras in the areas concerned, in order to discourage the customers of fireflies and reduce the risk of wrongful discharge of waste.

== Sports ==
Triante is home to several sport facilities in the city:

- A swimming pool in the Via Pitagora
- Tennis courts on the Via Pitagora
- The Oratorio Don Bosco in Via Duca d'Aosta, just behind the church
- The football field (used by Ges Monza), football and golf.
- The Sports Center's team Triante Triante 2000 located in Viale Lombardia around Rondò dei Pini.

== Other ==
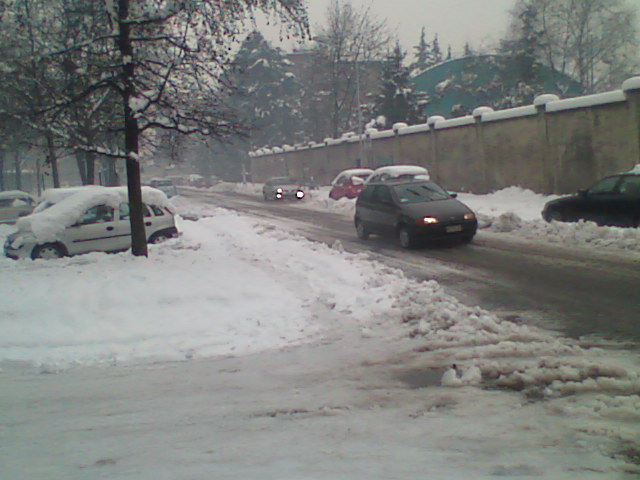
A view of Via Umberto Biancamano under snow

- Monza
- Monza Center (district of Monza)
- San Fruttuoso (district of Monza)
- San Giuseppe (district of Monza)
- Cederna (district of Monza)
- Villoresi Channel
- SS36
