= Giuseppe Guarino (cardinal) =

Italian Roman Catholic prelate and cardinal (1827-1897)

Servant of God Giuseppe Guarino
- Archbishop of Messina
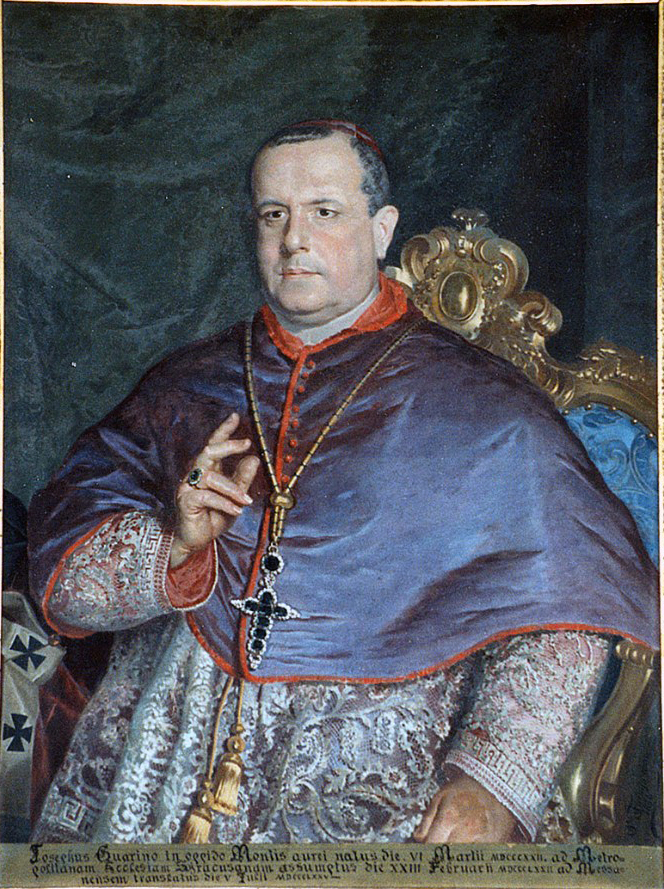
- Cardinal Giuseppe Guarino -archbishop
- Church: Roman Catholic Church
- Archdiocese: Messina
- See: Messina
- Appointed: 5 July 1875
- Installed: 27 July 1875
- Term ended: 22 September 1897
- Predecessor: Luigi Natoli
- Successor: Letterio D'Arrigo Ramondini
- Other post: Cardinal-Priest of San Tommaso in Parione (1893-97)
- Previous post: Archbishop of Siracusa (1872-75)

Orders
- Ordination: 22 September 1849 by Antonio Stromillo
- Consecration: 17 March 1872 by Michelangelo Celesia
- Created cardinal: 16 January 1893 by Pope Leo XIII
- Rank: Cardinal-Priest

Personal details
- Born: Giuseppe Guarino; 6 March 1827 Montedoro, Caltanissetta, Kingdom of the Two Sicilies
- Died: 21 September 1897 (aged 70) Messina, Kingdom of Italy

Ordination history of Giuseppe Guarino
History
Diaconal ordination
- Ordained by: Antonio Stromillo
Priestly ordination
- Ordained by: Antonio Stromillo
Episcopal consecration
- Principal consecrator: Michelangelo Celesia
- Co-consecrators: Ruggero Blundo; Giovanni Cirino
Cardinalate
- Elevated by: Pope Leo XIII
Episcopal succession
Bishops consecrated by Giuseppe Guarino as principal consecrator
- Giovanni Battista Bongiorni: 14 March 1875
- Giovanni Pietro Natoli: July 1890

Giuseppe Guarino (6 March 1827 – 21 September 1897) was an Italian Roman Catholic prelate and cardinal who served as the Archbishop of Messina from 1875 until his death. He was also the founder of the Apostoli della Sacra Famiglia. Guarino dedicated himself to proper religious formation for both priests and nuns while serving in both Siracusa and Messina and was known for reigniting the faith in those who were considered cut off from the faith.

His cause for beatification commenced decades after his death and he has been titled as a Servant of God.

== Life ==
Giuseppe Guarino was born on 6 March 1827 as the second of five children to Michele Guarino and Angela Papia. His siblings were:

- Paolino
- Achille
- Pietro
- Vicenza

His paternal uncle Pietro Guarino baptized the infant just after his birth and he received the names "Giuseppe Giovanni".

He began his ecclesial studies in Agrigento on 19 October 1840 after having first been vested in the ecclesiastical dress in the summer of 1838. It was during the course of his studies that he began a lifelong friendship with Giuseppe Benedetto Dusmet who later became a cardinal and Benedictine. He received the tonsure and first minor order on 21 December 1838 from the Bishop of Agrigento Ignazio Montemagno and in 1846 began his theological and philosophical studies. He later received the other minor orders from Domenico Maria Lo Jacono. Guarino received the subdiaconate on 23 September 1848 and later the diaconate in 1849 from the Bishop of Caltanissetta Antonio Stromillo. He was ordained to the priesthood on 22 September 1849 in Caltanissetta and received a special dispensation from Pope Pius IX for not having reached the canonical age requirement for ordination. Guarino served as the dean for the canon law department at the college in Palermo from 1861 until 1871 where he received a degree in canon and civil law.

He received his episcopal consecration in the Palermo Cathedral in 1872 after Pope Pius IX appointed him as the Archbishop of Siracusa. He had learnt of his appointment with great trepidation on 3 December 1871 from the Archbishop of Palermo and failed in dissuading the pope from the appointment in writing. Guarino assumed possession of his new see on 21 March and arrived via train on 17 April. Guarino held that position until he was transferred to the Messina archdiocese where he remained until his death; he learnt about the potential for a transfer in June 1875. Guarino arrived in Messina via train on 3 August. Pope Leo XIII created him as a cardinal in 1893 and he became the Cardinal-Priest of San Tommaso in Parione; he received the red hat and title in the week following the elevation before taking possession of his titular church on 6 August 1884. He established the Apostoli della Sacra Famiglia on 29 June 1889.

Guarino distinguished himself when he tended to the ill during smallpox and cholera epidemics in Messina between 1885 and 1887, and during the 1894 earthquake offered his life to God so that damage and casualties were minimal. He also admired Saint John Bosco and offered support and encouragement in their frequent correspondence. Bosco had titled Guarino as a "Salesian Cooperator" and Guarino had asked for Bosco to send Salesians to Messina to work with adolescents. Bosco died in 1888 and his successor Blessed Michele Rua accepted the request in 1893.

Guarino suffered a stroke on 1 February 1895 and this left him semi-paralyzed and unable to talk. He remained in his archdiocese but had aides (including his vicar general Monsignor Giuseppe Basile) to support him in management. Guarino contracted pneumonia in July 1897 which grew worse on 11 September prompting the canons Trischitta and Letterio d'Arrigo Ramondini to grant him the Extreme Unction. He died at 9:00 pm on 21 September 1897 due to complications from pneumonia and was buried in Messina. Guarino died after reciting the Divine Office. Bishop Guglielmo Stagno di Alcontres celebrated Guarino's funeral on 24 September with Saint Annibale Maria di Francia delivering the sermon.

In 1907 his remains were found to be incorrupt upon his exhumation. His remains were later transferred to the Messina Cathedral where a monument was erected. Guarino's remains were once more transferred in 1983 to the General House of the order that he had founded.

== Beatification process ==
The beatification process opened under Pope John Paul II after the Congregation for the Causes of Saints issued the official nihil obstat (no objections) edict meaning the cause could open, while also titling the late cardinal as a Servant of God. The diocesan phase of investigation opened in Messina on 10 November 1985 and concluded sometime later. The C.C.S. later granted validation to the diocesan process in Rome on 13 June 1998.

The cardinal's order lodged an official request in a letter dated 26 November 2015 to the Salesians asking them to oversee the cause. The request was accepted in December and the Salesians began to oversee the cause themselves.

The current postulator for the cause is the Salesian priest Pierluigi Cameroni.

Styles of Giuseppe Guarino
- Reference style: His Eminence
- Spoken style: Your Eminence
- Posthumous style: Servant of God
- Informal style: Cardinal

== Books and articles ==
- Aronica, Ferdinando, ed. (1984). Il cardinale Giuseppe Guarino: un grande pastore emerge dall'oblio : Atti del Convegno di studio sulla persona e l'opera del Cardinale Giuseppe Guarino, Messina, 27-29 aprile 1983 (in Italian). Messina.
- Bräuer, Martin (27 February 2014). Handbuch der Kardinäle: 1846-2012 (in German). De Gruyter. p. 156. ISBN 978-3-11-026947-5.
- Cicala, Antonio (2016). Messina dall'Unità al fascismo: Politica e amministrazione (1860-1926) (in Italian). Il Grano Edizioni. pp. 53–54. ISBN 978-88-99045-85-2.
- Falzone, Maria Teresa (2002). Le congregazioni religiose femminili nella Sicilia dell'Ottocento. Storia e cultura di Sicilia, 7 (in Italian). Caltanissetta: S. Sciascia. pp. 122–123, 138. ISBN 978-88-8241-110-7.
- Stabile, Francesco Michele (1997). Nunzio Russo: secolarizzazione ed evangelizzazione in Sicilia nella seconda metà dell'Ottocento. Studi del Centro "A. Cammarata", 26 (in Italian). Caltanisetta: S. Sciascia. pp. 44–50.
- Stabile, F. M.(2007). Il cardinale Giuseppe Guarino Intratex: Catania.
