= San Fruttuoso (Monza) =

- Frazione
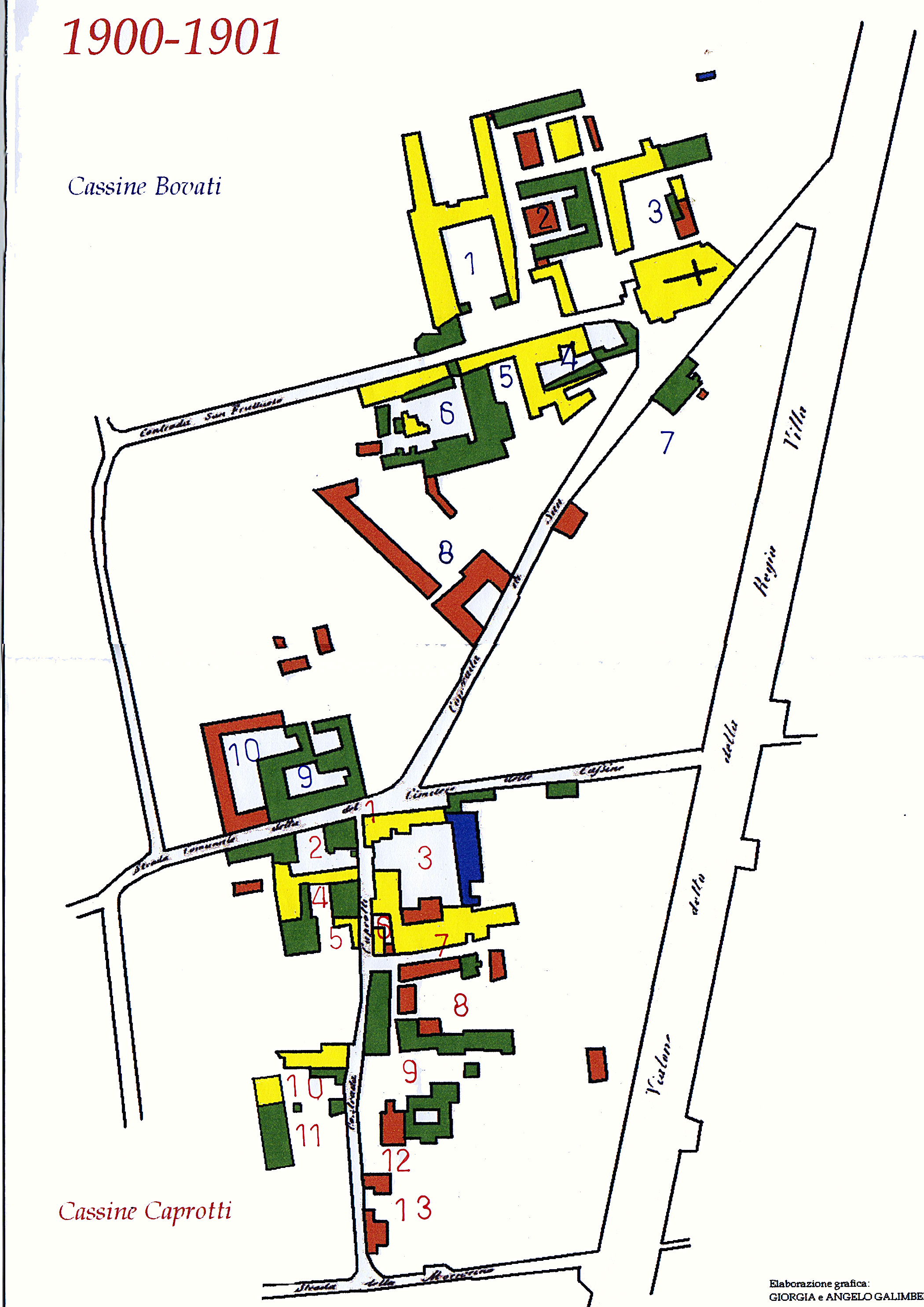
- Map of San Fruttuoso (Cascine Bovati) in 1901

- Location of San Fruttuoso in Italy
- Coordinates: 45°35′N 9°16′E
- Country: Italy
- Region: Lombardy
- Province: Monza and Brianza (MB)
- Comune: Monza
- Elevation: 162 m (531 ft)
- Demonym: Monzesi
- Time zone: UTC+1 (CET)
  - Summer (DST): UTC+2 (CEST)
- Postal code: 20900
- Dialing code: +39 039
- Patron saint: St. John the Baptist, St. Gerardo dei Tintori
- Saint day: June 24
- Website: Official website

San Fruttuoso is a district of Monza, in Italy, which is bordered to the east by the districts of St. Joseph and Triante, on the south by the municipality of Cinisello Balsamo and west by the municipality of Muggiò. Administratively it is included in District 4 of the Municipality of Monza, together with the districts of Triante, St. Joseph and St. Charles. There are 33,863 people residing in the district equal to 27.88% of the total population. Their average age is 44 years while the percentage of elderly over 65 years is 22.51%. With these numbers the District 4 is the most populous of all the districts as Monza and by extension is not dissimilar from the others, has a population density second only to the central area of the city. The presence of foreigners settled in the city is growing faster and for this district the number of resident foreigners is 1,818 which represents 5.35% of the population of the district. Among the foreign nationalities most represented this constituency are the Ecuadorian, Romanian and Bulgarian.
